= List of Executive Council of Hong Kong unofficial members 1896–1941 =

This is a list of unofficial members of the Executive Council in the colonial period from 1850 to 1941. The term of the Executive Council was interrupted during the Japanese occupation of Hong Kong.

== List of Unofficial Members of the Executive Council ==
Key:
Representatives of the Jardine, Matheson & Co.
Representatives of the Hongkong and Shanghai Banking Corporation
Chinese representatives

Members	Term of office	Background	Remarks
Catchick Paul Chater	8 September 1896 – 27 May 1926	Broker	Senior Unofficial Member (1896–1926); died in office
James Jardine Bell-Irving	8 September 1896 – 1899	Jardine, Matheson & Co.	
James Jardine Bell-Irving	30 May 1901 – 1902	Jardine, Matheson & Co.	Vice J. J. Keswick on leave
James Johnstone Keswick	18 May 1899 – 1901	Jardine, Matheson & Co.	
Charles Wedderburn Dickson	28 May 1902 – 1906	Jardine, Matheson & Co.	Vice J. J. Bell-Irving resigned
Thomas Henderson Whitehead	23 May – 3 June 1902	Chartered Bank of India, Australia and China	Temporary vice C. P. Chater absent
Charles Stewart Sharp	12 June – 4 September 1902	Gibb, Livingston & Co.	Temporary vice T. H. Whitehead absent
William Jardine Gresson	12 May 1904 – 11 May 1905	Jardine, Matheson & Co.	Temporary vice C. W. Dickson absent
William Jardine Gresson	31 July 1908 – 1908	Jardine, Matheson & Co.	Temporary during the absence of E. A. Hewett
Edbert Ansgar Hewett	1 June 1906 – 24 November 1915	P. & O. Steam Navigation Co.	Vice C. W. Dickson resigned; died in office
Henry Keswick	10 March 1908 – 1908	Jardine, Matheson & Co.	Temporary during the absence of E. A. Hewett
Henry Keswick	5 May 1910 – 1910	Jardine, Matheson & Co.	Temporary
Sir Henry Spencer Berkeley, K.C.	9 May 1908 – 1908	Barrister-at-Law	Temporary during the absence of H. Keswick
Henry Edward Pollock, K.C.	3 May 1911 – 1911	Barrister-at-Law	
Henry Edward Pollock, K.C.	11 May – 19 December 1912	Barrister-at-Law	Temporary during the absence of E. A. Hewett
Henry Edward Pollock, K.C.	9 March 1921 – 1941	Barrister-at-Law	Senior Unofficial Member (1926–41); reappointed in 1931, 1936
Ernest Hamilton Sharp, K.C.	1 February 1916 – 9 February 1922	Barrister-at-Law	Died in office
David Landale	25 July 1916 – 1916	Jardine, Matheson & Co. Hongkong and Shanghai Banking Corporation	Temporary vice C. P. Chater on leave
David Landale	2 August 1918 – 1918	Jardine, Matheson & Co. Hongkong and Shanghai Banking Corporation	Temporary vice E. H. Sharp on leave
Newton John Stabb	15 April 1919 – 1919	Hongkong and Shanghai Banking Corporation	Temporary vice E. H. Sharp on leave
Percy Hobson Holyoak	6 May 1920 – 1920	Reiss & Co. Hongkong and Shanghai Banking Corporation	Temporary vice C. P. Chater on leave
Percy Hobson Holyoak	29 June – 30 October 1921	Reiss & Co. Hongkong and Shanghai Banking Corporation	Temporary during absence of E. H. Sharp
Percy Hobson Holyoak	2 April 1924 – 1924	Reiss & Co. Hongkong and Shanghai Banking Corporation	Temporary during absence of C. P. Chater
Percy Hobson Holyoak	29 August 1924 – 1926	Reiss & Co. Hongkong and Shanghai Banking Corporation	Vice A. G. Stephen deceased; die in office
Edward Victor David Parr	17 September 1920 – 1920	P. & O. Steam Navigation Co. Hongkong and Shanghai Banking Corporation	Temporary vice E. H. Sharp on leave
Alexander Gordon Stephen	31 October 1921 – 1924	Hongkong and Shanghai Banking Corporation	Vice resignation of P. H. Holyoak during absence of E. H. Sharp; appointed on 12 February 1922 vice E. H. Sharp deceased
Charles Montague Ede	2 May 1922 – 1922	Union Insurance Society of Canton	Temporary during absence of H. E. Pollock
Charles Montague Ede	16 May 1924 – 1924	Union Insurance Society of Canton	Temporary during absence of A. G. Stephen & C. P. Chater
Archibald Orr Lang	2 June 1922 – 1922	Gibb, Livingston & Co. Hongkong and Shanghai Banking Corporation	Temporary during absence of C. P. Chater
Archibald Orr Lang	21 March 1925 – 1925	Gibb, Livingston & Co. Hongkong and Shanghai Banking Corporation	Temporary during H. E. Pollock acting Attorney General
Archibald Orr Lang	7 April 1926 – 1927	Gibb, Livingston & Co. Hongkong and Shanghai Banking Corporation	Vice P. H. Holyoak deceased
Sir Shouson Chow	9 July 1926 – 8 July 1936		First Chinese in the Council; Senior Chinese Unofficial Member (1926–36); vice C. P. Chater deceased; reappointed in 1931
Dallas Gerald Mercer Bernard	10 July 1926 – 1926	Jardine, Matheson & Co. Hongkong and Shanghai Banking Corporation	Temporary during absence of H. E. Pollock
Dallas Gerald Mercer Bernard	4 April 1927 –1927	Jardine, Matheson & Co. Hongkong and Shanghai Banking Corporation	Vice A. O. Lang
William Edward Leonard Shenton	1 June 1927 – 1927	Solicitor	Temporary during absence of H. E. Pollock
William Edward Leonard Shenton	3 April 1928 – 4 April 1936	Solicitor	Vice D. G. M. Bernard resigned; reappointed in 1933
Arthur Cecil Hynes	8 May 1928 – 1928	Hongkong and Shanghai Banking Corporation	Temporary during absence of W E. L. Shenton
John Owen Hughes	4 May 1928 – 1928	Harry Wicking & Co.	Temporary during absence of H. E. Pollock
John Owen Hughes	October 1928 – 1928	Harry Wicking & Co.	Temporary during absence of H. E. Pollock
John Owen Hughes	9 April 1930 – 29 April 1931	Harry Wicking & Co.	Temporary during absence of H. E. Pollock
Benjamin David Fleming Beith	13 June 1929 – 1929	Jardine, Matheson & Co.	Vice H. E. Pollock on leave
Robert Hormus Kotewall	3 October 1929 – 1929	Hong Kong Mercantile Co., Ltd.	Temporary vice Chow Shouson on leave
Robert Hormus Kotewall	18 September 1930 – 1930	Hong Kong Mercantile Co., Ltd.	Temporary vice Chow Shouson on leave
Robert Hormus Kotewall	27 May 1931 – 1931	Hong Kong Mercantile Co., Ltd.	Temporary vice Chow Shouson on leave
Robert Hormus Kotewall	19 May 1932 – 25 August 1932	Hong Kong Mercantile Co., Ltd.	Temporary vice Chow Shouson on leave
Robert Hormus Kotewall	14 October 1933 – 1933	Hong Kong Mercantile Co., Ltd.	Temporary vice Chow Shouson on leave
Robert Hormus Kotewall	3 November 1934 – 1934	Hong Kong Mercantile Co., Ltd.	Temporary vice Chow Shouson on leave
Robert Hormus Kotewall	4 June 1935 – 8 November 1935	Hong Kong Mercantile Co., Ltd.	Temporary vice Chow Shouson on leave
Robert Hormus Kotewall	9 July 1936 – 25 December 1941	Hong Kong Mercantile Co., Ltd.	Vice Chow Shouson retired; Senior Chinese Unofficial Member (1936–41)
Charles Gordon Stewart Mackie	4 June 1930 – 1930	Gibb, Livingston & Co. Hongkong and Shanghai Banking Corporation	Temporary during absence of W. E. L. Shenton
Charles Gordon Stewart Mackie	30 April 1930 – 2 December 1931	Gibb, Livingston & Co. Hongkong and Shanghai Banking Corporation	Temporary vice J. Owen Hughes during absence of H. E. Pollock
Charles Gordon Stewart Mackie	8 April 1933 – 1933	Gibb, Livingston & Co. Hongkong and Shanghai Banking Corporation	Temporary during absence of W. E. L. Shenton
Charles Gordon Stewart Mackie	4 May 1934 – 1934	Gibb, Livingston & Co. Hongkong and Shanghai Banking Corporation	Temporary during absence of Henry Pollock
John Johnstone Paterson	6 April 1936 – 25 December 1941	Jardine, Matheson & Co. Hongkong and Shanghai Banking Corporation	Vice W. E. L. Shenton resigned
William Henry Bell	8 June 1936 – 30 October 1936	Asiatic Petroleum Co. (South China) Ltd. Hongkong and Shanghai Banking Corporation	Temporary during absence of H. E. Pollock
Stanley Hudson Dodwell	31 October 1936 – 4 December 1936	Dodwell & Co. Hongkong and Shanghai Banking Corporation	Temporary during absence of H. E. Pollock
Stanley Hudson Dodwell	30 July 1938 – 7 October 1938	Dodwell & Co. Hongkong and Shanghai Banking Corporation	Temporary during absence of H. E. Pollock
Stanley Hudson Dodwell	11 March 1939 – 1939	Dodwell & Co. Hongkong and Shanghai Banking Corporation	Temporary during absence of J. J. Paterson
Stanley Hudson Dodwell	21 September 1940 – 1940	Dodwell & Co. Hongkong and Shanghai Banking Corporation	Temporary during absence of H. E. Pollock
Stanley Hudson Dodwell	26 March 1941 – 7 July 1941	Dodwell & Co. Hongkong and Shanghai Banking Corporation	Temporary
Chau Tsun-nin	29 June 1938 – 1938		Temporary during absence of R. H. Kotewall
Andrew Lusk Shields	8 July 1941 – 25 December 1941	Shewan, Tomes & Co.	Temporary during absence of S. H. Dodwell
Vandeleur Molyneux Grayburn	22 July 1941 – 25 December 1941	Hongkong and Shanghai Banking Corporation	

== See also ==
- List of Executive Council of Hong Kong unofficial members 1946–1997
- List of Legislative Council of Hong Kong members 1843–1941

== Bibliography ==
- Endacott, G. B. Government and people in Hong Kong, 1841–1962 : a constitutional history Hong Kong University Press. (1964) p. 250.
