= Arthur William Hughes =

Arthur William Hughes (5 May 1883 – 3 August 1964) was an Australian businessman, member of the Legislative Council of Hong Kong and the commander of the Hong Kong Volunteer Defence Corps.

Hughes was born in Adelaide, South Australia. During the First World War, he served in England and France with the 1st Pioneer Battalion of the Australian Imperial Force (AIF). Hughes joined the Union Insurance Society of Canton and was manager of the company in San Francisco. He succeeded Paul Lauder as general manager in 1934 and later chairman of the company. He was also director of the Hongkong and Shanghai Banking Corporation and chairman of the Hong Kong General Chamber of Commerce. During 1936 and 1937, he was member of the Legislative Council of Hong Kong.

On the eve of the Japanese invasion, Hughes was the commander of the Hong Kong Volunteer Defence Corps raised the number of the auxiliary force from 1,175 to 2,400 in June 1941, by recruiting men over 55 with military experience. The force was named "Hughesliers" after Hughes. When he retired to England, the Volunteers came under the command of Major J. J. Paterson, taipan of the Jardine, Matheson & Co.

He died in Sydney in 1964.

Legislative Council of Hong Kong
| Preceded by William Henry Bell | Unofficial Member; Representative for Hong Kong General Chamber of Commerce; 1936–1937 | Succeeded by Marcus Theodore Johnson |
