= Arthur Cecil Hynes =

Unofficial Member of the Executive Council of Hong Kong
- In office 1 June 1928 – 1928
- Appointed by: Sir Cecil Clementi
- Preceded by: Sir William Shenton
- Succeeded by: Sir William Shenton

Unofficial Member of the Legislative Council of Hong Kong
- In office 4 April 1927 – 1927
- Appointed by: Sir Cecil Clementi
- Preceded by: A. O. Lang
- Succeeded by: B. D. F. Beith

Personal details
- Born: 11 July 1873
- Died: 16 November 1940 (aged 67) Highampton, North Devon, England
- Education: Bedford School
- Occupation: Banker

Arthur Cecil Hynes JP (1873-1940) was the chief manager of the Hongkong and Shanghai Banking Corporation.

== Biography ==
Arthur Hynes was born on 11 July 1873 and educated at Bedford School. He arrived in the Far East in 1897 as a junior assistant of the Penang branch of the Hongkong and Shanghai Banking Corporation. He was transferred to Singapore, Bangkok, Hongkong, Amoy and Ipoh before he returned to the Hongkong office as chief accountant. He was promoted to be sub-manager in 1915 and Shanghai branch sub-manager in 1917. He was appointed manager of the Singapore branch in 1922 and the chief manager in 1926 in succession to Arthur Howard Barlow.

Hynes was then appointed as the unofficial member of the Legislative Council in 1927 and the Executive Council of Hong Kong in 1928. Among other public appointments he was a member of the committees of the Hong Kong General Chamber of Commerce, the China Association, the court of the University of Hong Kong, the Matilda International Hospital and the Alice Memorial Hospital, and Seamen's Missions. He was also a steward of the Hong Kong Jockey Club and vice-commodore of the Royal Hong Kong Yacht Club.

Hynes retired from the post of chief manager in March 1930 and lived with his wife at Beara Court, Highampton, North Devon, England. He was appointed as a Justice of the peace in 1933.

Arthur Hynes died on 16 November 1940.

Business positions
Preceded by A. H. Barlow	Chief Manager of the Hongkong and Shanghai Banking Corporation; 1927–1930	Succeeded by V. M. Grayburn
Legislative Council of Hong Kong
Preceded by A. O. Lang	Unofficial Member; 1927–1929	Succeeded by B. D. F. Beith
Political offices
Preceded by W. E. L. Shenton	Unofficial Member of the Executive Council of Hong Kong; 1928	Succeeded by W. E. L. Shenton
