= S. H. Dodwell =

British businessperson and politician

S. H. Dodwell CBE

Chairman and Managing Director of the Dodwell & Co.
- In office 1925–1953
- Preceded by: G. B. Dodwell
- Succeeded by: G. M. Dodwell

Personal details
- Born: July 1878 Cowley St John, Oxfordshire, England
- Died: 11 July 1960 (aged 81–82) Uckfield, Sussex, England
- Spouse: Phoebe Joyce Butlin
- Children: Michael Carr

Logo of former trading company Dodwell & Co.

Stanley Hudson Dodwell (1878–1960), CBE was a British businessperson and politician who was active in Hong Kong. He served as the chairman of Dodwell & Co. and member of the Legislative Council and the Executive Council of Hong Kong.

== Business career ==
S. H. Dodwell was a nephew of George Benjamin Dodwell, founder of Dodwell & Co., which was one of the leading British merchant firms in the late 19th and early 20th century. He joined the company in January 1897 and began with a salary of £30 per annum. In 1899 Dodwell became the company's representative on the Baltic Shipping Exchange, responsible for arranging tonnage to fill Dodwell & Company's turns on the New York berth. He took charge of the firm from his uncle in 1912 and remained as chairman until 1953.

Besides his own firm, he was also on the board of many local leading companies. He was a director of the Hongkong and Shanghai Banking Corporation and was elected chairman in 1912. He was also chairman of the Union Insurance Society of Canton and the British Traders' Insurance Co., and member of the Consulting Committee of Shewan Tomes & Co. among others.

== Public services ==
He was an unofficial member of the Legislative Council of Hong Kong on multiple occasions for decades. In June 1917 he was appointed an unofficial member on the Legislative Council during Henry Pollock's leave, again in October 1918 for Edward Shellim, and as a substitute for Robert Gordon Shewan in March 1919 and January 1920. He again served on the Legislative Council from 1936 to 1941. In April 1936, he was appointed for a four-year term on William Shenton's resignation and was reappointed in April 1940.

Dodwell was also a member of the Executive Council numerous times. He was appointed on Henry Pollock's absence in October 1936, July 1938, and September 1940, and on J. J. Paterson's absence in March 1939 and March 1941.

He was also a member of the Medical Board, the Authorized Architects' Committee, and the Board of War Taxation, which the government set up for raising revenue for the war preparation on the eve of the Pacific War. Dodwell, however, strongly opposed the new Income Tax Bill presented by the Hong Kong Government. He feared the new taxation would drive out industrial enterprises and capital and prevent new ones from coming in, and the tax collecting would be too costly. He demanded some amendments of the bill and asked for an enquiry into the wartime departments to be set up for providing jobs for senior and former government officials.

Dodwell was part of the Hong Kong Volunteer Defence Corps. In 1938, the governor combined the advisory committees for the Hong Kong Volunteer Defence Corps and Hong Kong Naval Volunteer into the advisory committee of the Volunteer Advisory Committee. Dodwell was appointed a member of the newly formed committee for military advice.

He lived in Perth, Australia during the war and became the chairman of the East Asian Residents' Association, which consisted of Far Eastern residents who had fled from the Japanese-occupied territories. He stationed in London for the Dodwell & Co. after the war.

He was awarded the Commander of the Order of the British Empire in June 1947 for his public services in Hong Kong.

== Personal life ==
He was the captain of the Royal Hong Kong Golf Club from 1916 to 1917. He was still a keen golfer in his later life.

Dodwell married Phoebe Joyce Butlin (1889–1976) of London. Their son Michael Carr Dodwell, who was part of the Hong Kong Volunteer Defence Corps, died on 15 May 1944 at the age of 21 and was buried at the Stanley Military Cemetery.

== See also ==
- List of Executive Council of Hong Kong unofficial members 1896–1941

Legislative Council of Hong Kong
| Preceded by Percy Hobson Holyoak | Unofficial Member; Representative for Hong Kong General Chamber of Commerce; 1917 | Succeeded by Percy Hobson Holyoak |
| Preceded by Edward Shellim | Unofficial Member; 1918–1919 | Succeeded by Edward Shellim |
| Preceded by Robert Gordon Shewan | Unofficial Member; 1919 | Succeeded by Robert Gordon Shewan |
| Preceded by Robert Gordon Shewan | Unofficial Member; 1920 | Succeeded by Edward Victor David Parr |
| Preceded by William Henry Bell | Unofficial Member; 1934 | Succeeded by William Henry Bell |
| Preceded by William Edward Leonard Shenton | Unofficial Member; 1936–1941 | Succeeded by Edgar Davidson |
Business positions
| Preceded by W. L. Pattenden | Chairman of the Hongkong and Shanghai Banking Corporation; 1917–1918 | Succeeded by P. H. Holyoak |
| Preceded by C. Gordon Mackie | Chairman of the Hongkong and Shanghai Banking Corporation; 1935–1936 | Succeeded by John Johnstone Paterson |
| Preceded by W. H. Bell | Chairman of the Hong Kong General Chamber of Commerce; 1936–1937 | Succeeded by M. T. Johnson |
| Preceded by C. Gordon Mackie | Chairman of the Hong Kong General Chamber of Commerce; 1941 | Japanese occupation of Hong Kong |
