= C. Gordon Mackie =

Scottish businessman in Hong Kong

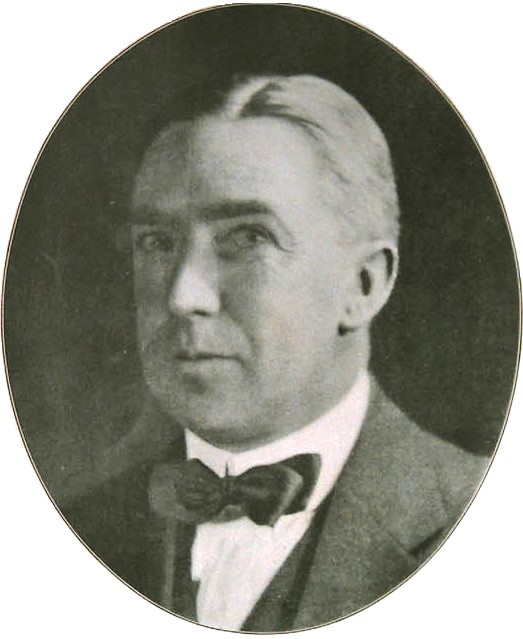
A portrait of Mackie

Charles Gordon Stewart Mackie was a Scottish businessman in Hong Kong and member of the Legislative Council and Executive Council of Hong Kong.

== Biography ==
C. Gordon Mackie was associated with China and Hong Kong and head of many public utilities companies. He was the head of the two big local firms, Mackinnon, Mackenzie & Co, the shipping company and managing director of the Gibb, Livingston & Co, agent for the public utility company Hongkong Electric Company. He had also been chairman and deputy chairman of the board of the Hongkong and Shanghai Banking Corporation.

Mackie was made Justice of the Peace and was elected to the Legislative Council as representative of the Justices of the Peace during the absence of Henry Pollock in May and October 1928. In 1931, he was nominated to replace J. Owen Hughes as the representative of the Hong Kong General Chamber of Commerce for a four-year-term from 17 May. He served on the Legislative Council for six years until he retired and returned to Britain in April 1935. Tribute was paid by Governor William Peel upon his leave.

He was appointed to the Executive Council on several occasions, in June 1930 and in April 1933 during William Shenton's absence, April 1931 in the place of J. Owen Hughes during Henry Pollock's on leave, and again in May 1934 for Henry Pollock.

Among others he was also the member of the Authorized Architects' Committee and Harbour Advisory Committee.

He was the chairman of the Stewards of the Hong Kong Jockey Club. On his trip to Macao for the Spring Race Meeting of the Macau Jockey Club in March 1932, the ship he took, Venezia, crashed with Sui Tai which was on its way to Hong Kong near Lantau Island. Mackie and his wife were the survivors in the collision.

His daughter Jean Mackie was a keen lady flier and was the first lady and also first member of the Hong Kong Flying Club to receive an "A" flying certificate in June 1934.

Legislative Council of Hong Kong
Preceded by Henry Edward Pollock	Unofficial Member; Representative for Justices of the Peace; 1928	Succeeded by Henry Edward Pollock
Preceded by Henry Edward Pollock	Unofficial Member; Representative for Justices of the Peace; 1930–1931	Succeeded by Henry Edward Pollock
Preceded by John Owen Hughes	Unofficial Member; Representative for Hong Kong General Chamber of Commerce; 1931–1935	Succeeded by William Henry Bell
Sporting positions
Preceded by H. P. White	Chairman of the Hong Kong Jockey Club; 1929–1935	Succeeded by Marcus Theodore Johnson
Political offices
Preceded by William Shenton	Unofficial Member of the Executive Council of Hong Kong; 1930	Succeeded by William Shenton
Preceded by John Owen Hughes	Unofficial Member of the Executive Council of Hong Kong; 1931	Succeeded by John Owen Hughes
Preceded by William Shenton	Unofficial Member of the Executive Council of Hong Kong; 1933	Succeeded by William Shenton
Preceded by Henry Edward Pollock	Unofficial Member of the Executive Council of Hong Kong; 1934	Succeeded by Henry Edward Pollock
Business positions
Preceded by J. A. Plummer	Chairman of the Hongkong and Shanghai Banking Corporation; 1931–1932	Succeeded by John Johnstone Paterson
Preceded by Thomas Ernest Pearce	Chairman of the Hongkong and Shanghai Banking Corporation; 1934–1935	Succeeded by Stanley Hudson Dodwell
