= William Henry Bell (businessman) =

British businessman in Hong Kong

- Occupation: businessman
- Spouse(s): Dora Bell, Helen Joyce Calkin

William Henry Bell was the head of the Asiatic Petroleum Company and member of the Executive Council and the Legislative Council of Hong Kong.

== Biography ==
He joined the Asiatic Petroleum Company and became the manager and then head of the oil company in South China and the Philippines. He represented the company in the Hong Kong General Chamber of Commerce and elected as chairman in 1935. He was also directors of other public companies including director of the Hongkong and Shanghai Banking Corporation.

He was appointed to the Legislative Council on several occasions. In May 1931, he elected by the Justices of Peace to be their representatives on the Legislative Council during Henry Pollock's absence. He was again appointed to the Legislative Council in April 1932 and April 1934. In 1935, he was elected by the Chamber of Commerce on 15 April in succession of C. Gordon Mackie who retired and left Hong Kong. In 1936, he was appointed to the Executive Council.

He was also member of the many government agencies, such as the Harbour Board, the Authorized Architects' Committee and Consulting Committee, and the Licensing Board. He was also nominated by the government to the Court of the University of Hong Kong in 1934.

Bell retired from the Legislative Council in July 1936 and continued to serve on the Executive Council until November when he returned to England. Tribute was paid by Governor Sir Andrew Caldecott and member of the Legislative Council John Johnstone Paterson for his works on the legislature. In November 1936, he left by the SS President Coolidge for America and England.

His first wife, Dora Bell, died in November 1933. He later married to Helen Joyce Calkin, third daughter of Walter L. Calkiin of Hightrees, Ashley Road, Walton-on-Thames, in 1935 at Hong Kong.

Legislative Council of Hong Kong
Preceded by John Owen Hughes	Unofficial Member; Representative for Hong Kong General Chamber of Commerce; 1931	Succeeded by Charles Gordon Stewart Mackie
Preceded by Charles Gordon Stewart Mackie	Unofficial Member; Representative for Hong Kong General Chamber of Commerce; 1932–1933	Succeeded by Charles Gordon Stewart Mackie
Preceded by John Johnstone Paterson	Unofficial Member; 1934	Succeeded by John Johnstone Paterson
Preceded by Charles Gordon Stewart Mackie	Unofficial Member; Representative for Hong Kong General Chamber of Commerce; 1935–1936	Succeeded by Arthur William Hughes
