= Benjamin David Fleming Beith =

British businessman

Benjamin David Fleming Beith (1884–1960) was a British businessman in China and member of the Executive Council and Legislative Council of Hong Kong.

B. D. F. Beith was the manager of the Jardine Matheson & Co. and worked in both Hong Kong and Shanghai. He was also member of the board of the Hongkong and Shanghai Banking Corporation in 1925.

He was made Justice of the Peace in January 1928. In the same year, he was appointed to the Legislative Council in May. In April 1929, he was nominated by the Chamber of Commerce to fill the vacancy at the Legislative Council for eight months during the absence of John Owen Hughes. He was again appointed to the Legislative Council in March 1930 in replacement of A. C. Hynes and continued to serve until 1933.

He became member of the Executive Council in June 1929 during the absence of Henry Pollock.

Among others he was also member of the Authorized Architects' Committee.

Legislative Council of Hong Kong
Preceded by John Owen Hughes	Unofficial Member; Representative for Hong Kong General Chamber of Commerce; 1929	Succeeded by John Owen Hughes
Preceded by Arthur Cecil Hynes	Unofficial Member; 1930–1933	Succeeded by John Johnstone Paterson
