= A. O. Lang =

Archibald Orr Lang
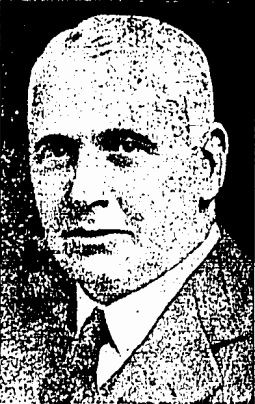

Unofficial member of the Legislative Council of Hong Kong
- In office 24 November 1921 – 3 January 1923
- Appointed by: Sir Reginald Edward Stubbs
- Preceded by: Sir Henry Pollock
- Succeeded by: Sir Henry Pollock

Personal details
- Born: ca. 1880
- Died: 10 July 1957 (aged 77)
- Spouse: Ellen Margaret Love
- Relations: Beverley Lang (granddaughter)
- Children: Shelia Macnaughton Lang; William Macnaughton Lang
- Occupation: Businessman

Archibald Orr Lang (circa 1880 – 10 July 1957) was a Scottish shipping businessman and unofficial member of the Executive Council and Legislative Council of Hong Kong.

== Career ==
Lang arrived in Hong Kong in 1904 to join the Gibb, Livingston & Co. He became a partner of the company and also the Mackinnon, Mackenzie & Co. From 1916 to 1927, he was the head of the Gibb, Livingston & Co.

He served on the committee of the Hong Kong General Chamber of Commerce and became chairman in 1922 and vice-chairman in 1927. On 24 November 1921, Lang was elected by the Chamber to represent the business interest in the Legislative Council of Hong Kong during Sir Henry Pollock's absence. Since he had served on the Legislative Council on several occasions and on the Executive Council from 1922.

During his stay in Hong Kong, he was director of many public companies., including the Union Insurance Society of Canton, the Hong Kong and Kowloon Wharf and Godown Company, the Indo-China Steam Navigation Company, the China Sugar Refining Company, the Hong Kong, Canton, and Macao Steamboat Company and the Peak Tramways Company. He was also a director on the board of the Hongkong and Shanghai Banking Corporation and chairman of the bank in 1923. He left Hong Kong in April 1927 for London and his farewell gathering was attended by Governor Cecil Clementi.

In December 1927, A. O. Lang was appointed assistant manager of the Peninsular and Oriental Steam Navigation Company, one of the biggest British shipping companies, in succession to A. C. Symes on retirement. He was subsequently appointed the board of the P & O Company with Sir Harcourt Butler after the death of Lord Inchcape and Lord Kilbracken.

He was also the chairman of the Far Eastern Conference, a conference for all shipping companies in the Far East, from 1927 to 1938. He resigned after being appointed deputy chairman of the P. & O. Company in 1939. At the time he also held the post of deputy chairman of the B. I. Company. Lang continued to become managing director and deputy chairman of the P. & O. Company during the Second World War.

== Family and death ==
He married Ellen Margaret Love in 1910 in Hong Kong. Their daughter, Shelia Macnaughton Lang, was born in Hong Kong in 1913. Their son, William Macnaughton Lang, was born in Hong Kong in 1918 and also worked for P & O in London for many years. Beverley Lang, Mrs Justice Lang, an English High Court judge, is his granddaughter.

A.O. Lang died on 10 July 1957 at the age of 77.

Legislative Council of Hong Kong
Preceded by Percy Hobson Holyoak	Unofficial Member; Representative for Hong Kong General Chamber of Commerce; 1921	Succeeded by Percy Hobson Holyoak
Preceded by Percy Hobson Holyoak	Unofficial Member; 1921–1923	Succeeded by Percy Hobson Holyoak
Preceded by Edward Victor David Parr	Unofficial Member; 1923–1927	Succeeded by Arthur Cecil Hynes
Political offices
Preceded by Catchick Paul Chater	Unofficial Member of the Executive Council of Hong Kong; 1922	Succeeded by Catchick Paul Chater
Preceded by Henry Edward Pollock	Unofficial Member of the Executive Council of Hong Kong; 1925	Succeeded by Henry Edward Pollock
Preceded by Percy Hobson Holyoak	Unofficial Member of the Executive Council of Hong Kong; 1926–1927	Succeeded by Dallas Gerald Mercer Bernard
Business positions
Preceded by G. M. Dodwell	Chairman of the Hongkong and Shanghai Banking Corporation; 1923–1924	Succeeded by Dallas Gerald Mercer Bernard
