= Sercan Tırpan =

Turkish jockey

Personal information
- Nationality: Turkish

Sport
- Country: Turkey
- Sport: Horse racing
- Event: Jockey

Sercan Tırpan is a Turkish jockey who began riding in 2008 and has raced on the Turkish Jockey Club (TJK) circuit.

== Career ==
Tırpan had his first official ride on 4 January 2016 at Osmangazi Racecourse on Yuceefe, and his first win on 17 February 2016 at the same track on Ruyagibi.

As of November 2026 he had 1,264 career rides with 72 wins (3 per cent) and 204 placings (10 per cent). His recent riding weight is 52 kg.

== Statistics by year ==
Year	Rides	Wins	Second	Third
2019	305	24	35	33
2020	283	16	16	28
2021	328	12	19	22
2022	250	11	17	16
2023	218	9	12	11
2024	262	15	20	21
2025	193	3	16	18
2026	192	11	10	15

Source: Turkish Jockey Club statistics

== International ==
In November 2014 Tırpan represented Turkey at the apprentice tournament organised by the Macau Jockey Club. He finished third on the first day on Final Impression and eighth on Golden Shooter, then took second place on Race King over 1,800 m on turf, ending the tournament fifth overall.
