= Hong Kong Jockey Club College =

The Official Logo of The Hong Kong Jockey Club College

The Hong Kong Jockey Club College (HKJCC), under the umbrella of The Hong Kong Jockey Club, was established in 2010 to support the career development of employees in accordance with the Club's holistic people development strategy by providing training programmes with QF and non-QF accredited programmes and certificates. Currently, two main academies are available at the College:

1. Service & Hospitality Academy providing up to QF Level III accredited programmes
2. Business Management Academy providing up to QF Level IV accredited programmes.

The programmes on offer from these academies are recognised by the HKSAR Government’s Qualifications Framework (QF) with the HKJCC serving as a talent development hub and centralised umbrella for the Club's talent development.

== Background ==
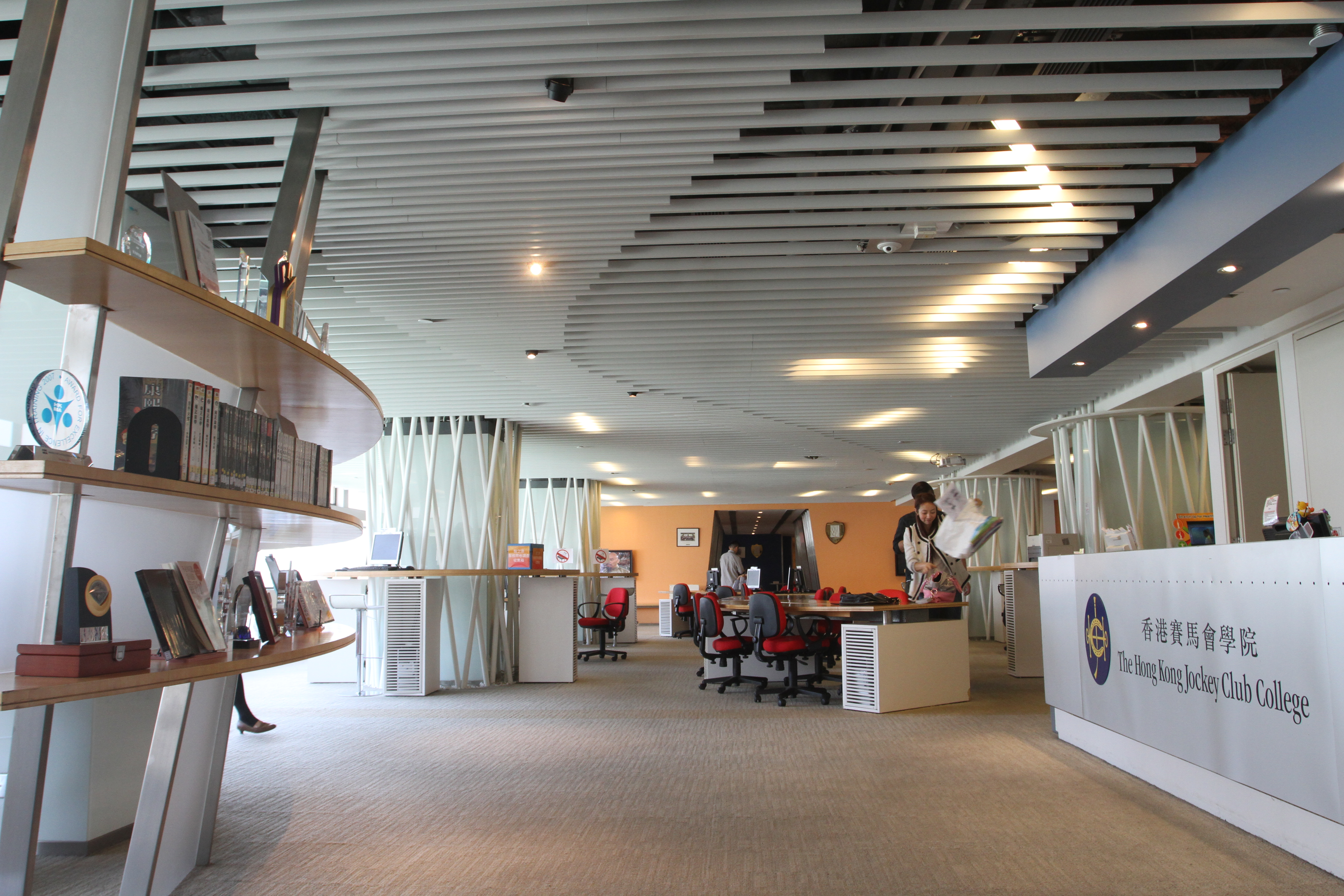
Campus of HKJCC at Happy Valley Racecourse

Established in Hong Kong for 128 years and as one of Hong Kong's largest employers, with nearly 27,000 full-time and part-time staff, The Hong Kong Jockey Club is also one of the few employers in Hong Kong to provide continuous training opportunities for both part-time and full-time employees.

The HKJC provides on average 200 people development programmes each year, which amounts to 900 training sessions. In 2010/2011, the total number of training hours reached 510,000, covering both full-time and part-time employees, equivalent to 5.2 training days for each participant.

== Honors ==
- The HK Government has recently awarded the HKJC College a commendation for awarding the most Recognition of Prior Learning certificates to colleagues who have acquired specialised skills in a certain industry such as gardening and property management. Over 300 staff from the Club's Racing and Property Divisions has received a total of about 400 Level I to III certifications through this mechanism under the Qualifications Framework.
- Ranked one of the Top 3 Chinese Corporate Universities in China at the 2012 Chinese Corporate University Rankings Prize Presentation Ceremony, organised by Overseas Education College Shanghai Jiaotong University and National Business Daily
- The Professional Diploma in Human Resources Management under the Business Management Academy was awarded as one of the Top 20 Best Programmes by Overseas Education College Shanghai Jiaotong University and National Business Daily
- The HKJC College has also been awarded the Gold Award for the Skills Category of the Award for Excellence in Training & Development by the Hong Kong Management Association
- Articulation to degree programmes at UK universities
