= Percy Hobson Holyoak =

British businessman (1874–1926)

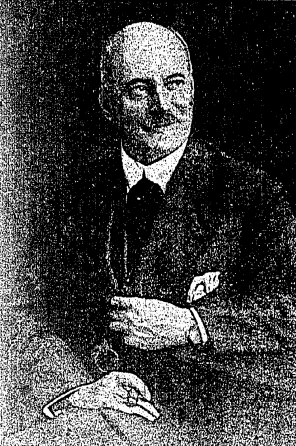

Unofficial Member of the Executive Council of Hong Kong
- In office 6 May 1920 – 1920
- Appointed by: Sir R. E. Stubbs
- Preceded by: C. P. Chater
- Succeeded by: C. P. Chater
- In office 29 June 1921 – 30 October 1921
- Appointed by: Sir R. E. Stubbs
- Preceded by: E. H. Sharp
- Succeeded by: E. H. Sharp
- In office 2 April 1924 – 1924
- Appointed by: Sir R. E. Stubbs
- Preceded by: C. P. Chater
- Succeeded by: C. P. Chater
- In office 29 August 1924 – 1926
- Appointed by: Sir F. H. May
- Preceded by: A. G. Stephen
- Succeeded by: A. O. Lang

Unofficial Member of the Legislative Council of Hong Kong
- In office 16 December 1915 – 18 March 1926
- Appointed by: Sir F. H. May
- Preceded by: E. A. Hewett
- Succeeded by: D. G. M. Bernard

Chairman of the Hongkong and Shanghai Banking Corporation
- In office February 1918 – February 1919
- Preceded by: S. H. Dodwell
- Succeeded by: J. A. Plummer

Personal details
- Born: 1874 Chesham-Bois, Buckinghamshire, England
- Died: 25 May 1926 London, England
- Spouse: Neilie Gertude Cowper
- Children: 2 (? - 25 May 1926; his death)

Percy Hobson Holyoak (1874 – 25 May 1926) was a British businessman in Hong Kong and a member of the Legislative Council and Executive Council of Hong Kong.

== Background and business career ==
Percy Hobson Holyoak was the son of the Rev. T. H. Holyoak of Chesham-Bois, Buckinghamshire, England. He first arrived in Far East as a member of the Reiss & Co., a well-known Manchester trading firm in Hong Kong since 1864. He moved to Hong Kong in 1899 and was in charge of the Hong Kong office as a managing partner. He subsequently took over the firm with P. W. Massey when it suffered in the commercial slump in 1921 and 1922 and altered the name to Holyoak, Massey, & Co. with Holyoak as the senior partner.

Holyoak also held positions in many leading public companies. Among others, he was the chairman of the board of directors of the Hongkong and Shanghai Banking Corporation for three times, chairman of the board of directors of the Hongkong, Canton, and Macao Steamboat Company, Ltd., chairman of the Union Insurance Society of Canton, and director of the Hongkong Telephone Company.

== Public services ==
Holyoak was the chairman of the Hong Kong General Chamber of Commerce in from 1917 to 1918 and 1920 to 1921. He was nominated as unofficial member of the Legislative Council as a representative of the chamber on the death of E. A. Hewett in 1915 and later on was appointed to the Executive Council for various times. Despite being a large contributor to the raising funds during the First World War, in early 1917 Holyoak moved in the Legislative Council to exclude German merchants from the colony for ten years, mandated by the Chamber of Commerce. In 1919, he and Henry Pollock formed the Constitutional Reform Association of Hong Kong to demand London for a further representation in the colonial legislature.

He also associated with the Chinese community in public work such as his chairmanship of the Joint Committee of the Hong Kong General Chamber of Commerce and the Chinese General Chamber of Commerce which supervised the arrangements for the Hong Kong section of the Wembley Exhibition.

Among other public offices he was chairman of the Hong Kong Club and Alice Memorial Hospital, vice-chairman of the Hong Kong Y.M.C.A., president of the Scout Association of Hong Kong, member of the Court of the University of Hong Kong and Justice of Peace from March 1909. He was also a Freemason and was appointed the District Grand Master of English Freemasonry in Hong Kong and South China by the Duke of Connaught.

== Death and family ==
Holyoak married Neilie Gertude Cowper, daughter of the late William Cowper of Moseley. They had two daughters named Joyce and Dorothy. On 7 April 1926, he left Hong Kong and went back to England with his wife and two daughters by the Blue Funnel Liner, Sarpedon when he was very ill, having suffered from serious kidney illness for some years. The purpose of the trip of mainly reporting to L. S. Amery, the Secretary of State for the Colonies on Chinese political and commercial issues. He died on 25 May in London shortly after his arrival. The funeral took place at Yardley Wood Church on Friday 28 May in Moseley, Birmingham where his wife's family was from. The funeral service was read by the Archdeacon of Birmingham Cannon C. E. Hopton. There was also a memorial services held at St. John's Cathedral on 31 May, attended by many leading figures in the colony, including Governor Cecil Clementi.

Legislative Council of Hong Kong
Preceded by Edbert Ansgar Hewett	Unofficial Member; Representative for Hong Kong General Chamber of Commerce; 1915–1926	Succeeded by Dallas Gerald Mercer Bernard
Political offices
Preceded by Catchick Paul Chater	Unofficial Member of the Executive Council of Hong Kong; 1920	Succeeded by Catchick Paul Chater
Preceded by Charles Stewart Sharp	Unofficial Member of the Executive Council of Hong Kong; 1921	Succeeded by Charles Stewart Sharp
Preceded by Catchick Paul Chater	Unofficial Member of the Executive Council of Hong Kong; 1924	Succeeded by Catchick Paul Chater
Preceded by Alexander Gordon Stephen	Unofficial Member of the Executive Council of Hong Kong; 1924–1926	Succeeded by Archibald Orr Lang
Business positions
Preceded by Stanley Hudson Dodwell	Chairman of the Hongkong and Shanghai Banking Corporation; 1918–1919	Succeeded by J. A. Plummer
