= Alec Pearce =

English cricketer (1910–1982)

Personal information
- Full name: Thomas Alexander Pearce
- Born: 18 December 1910; Hong Kong
- Died: 11 August 1982 (aged 71); Tunbridge Wells, Kent, England
- Batting: Right-handed
- Bowling: Right-arm off break
- Relatives: Thomas Ernest Pearce (father)

Domestic team information
- Years: Team
- 1930–1946: Kent

Career statistics
Competition	First-class
Matches	55
Runs scored	1,213
Batting average	16.39
100s/50s	1/3
Top score	106
Balls bowled	36
Wickets	1
Bowling average	22.00
5 wickets in innings	0
10 wickets in match	0
Best bowling	1/22
Catches/stumpings	23/–
- Source: CricInfo, 23 January 2011

Thomas Alexander Pearce (18 December 1910 – 11 August 1982), known as Alec Pearce, was an English cricketer who played for Kent County Cricket Club and for the Hong Kong in Interport matches. He subsequently served as president of both clubs.

== Early life and family ==
Pearce was born in Hong Kong in 1910, the son of Thomas Ernest Pearce, a businessman in the then British colony. His grandfather, the Reverend TW Pearce, was a missionary in the colony and Pearce's father worked for J. D. Hutchison & Co, a trading company, from 1903 before purchasing a controlling share in the company in 1917. TE Pearce played cricket for the colony in Interport matches against Shanghai and Malaya and was described as one of the strengths of the team between the wars.

Pearce was educated at Charterhouse School, where he was in the school cricket XI for three years. He was described as "one of the best bats Charterhouse have had for some time" and as a "natural games-player" who played rackets for Charterhouse.

== Cricket career and later life ==
After leaving school, he made his first-class cricket debut for Kent in August 1930 against Lancashire at Dover. Pearce played regularly for the county in 1931 and 1932 and won his county cap in the later season, scoring 581 runs at a batting average of 24.13 during the season, including a score of 83 at Tunbridge Wells against Northants as part of a partnership of 194 runs with Les Ames which was described as "brilliant cricket". He returned to Hong Kong at the end of the season to join his father's business, although he played for Kent in 1937 and 1946 whilst in England on leave.

During World War II Pearce was captured after the Japanese occupation of Hong Kong in 1941. His father was killed during the Battle of Hong Kong while serving as a private soldier and Pearce was imprisoned with his brother John at Sham Shui Po for the duration of the war. He returned to England in 1946, scoring his only first-class century during the 1946 season. He made three first-class appearances for MCC between 1932 and 1946.

Pearce was described in his Wisden obituary as playing mainly "the typical rackets player's off-side strokes", although his "glorious fielding in any position" was considered his "main value" to Kent. He was a "prolific scorer" in club cricket, captained Hong Kong in Interport matches and was "a leading figure" in Hong Kong cricket, serving as Hong Kong Cricket Club President between 1961 and 1967. He retired to England where he was a member of the Kent Committee and President of the club in 1978 as well as being a scratch golfer.

Pearce lived at Hawkhurst in retirement and died in hospital at Tunbridge Wells in August 1982 aged 71. After his death Pearce's widow, Nina, presented a set of framed photographs of every capped Kent player to the club in his memory. These, which continue to be added to, hang in the Pavilion at the St Lawrence Ground, Kent's Canterbury headquarters. The couple had two daughters.
