= Vandeleur Molyneux Grayburn =

Sir Vandeleur Molyneux Grayburn
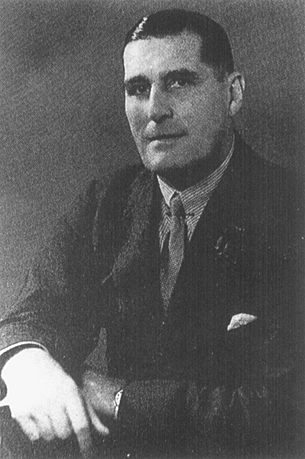

Unofficial Member of the Executive Council of Hong Kong
- In office 22 July 1941 – 25 December 1941
- Appointed by: Sir Mark Young

Personal details
- Born: 28 July 1881 England
- Died: 21 August 1943 (aged 62) Stanley Prison, Occupied Territory of Hong Kong
- Resting place: Stanley Military Cemetery
- Spouse(s): Ruth Danvers Higgs; Minnie Doris Robson; Muriel Mary Mellor
- Education: Denstone College
- Occupation: Banker

Sir Vandeleur Molyneux Grayburn (28 July 1881 – 21 August 1943) was the chief manager of the Hongkong and Shanghai Banking Corporation from 1930 to 1943. He was the most powerful financier in the Far East in the 1930s, and took an important role in establishing Hong Kong dollar as the official currency of the colony. During the Japanese occupation of Hong Kong in World War II, Grayburn was arrested for providing monetary and logistics aid to military prisoners and bank employees held hostage, imprisoned, and later died at Stanley Prison.

== Early life and career ==
Grayburn was born on 28 July 1881 in England. His grandfather was Rev. William Grayburn serving in Dublin, Ireland. He was the youngest son of William Echlin Grayburn and Margaret Ellen Markham Grayburn with three brothers and three sisters. He was educated in Jersey and at Denstone College in Staffordshire. Upon leaving school he joined the bank of Leatham, Tew & Co in Goole.

He joined the Hongkong and Shanghai Banking Corporation (HSBC) in 1900. He first worked as an assistant at the London office and in 1904 was transferred to the Far East. He had stationed in the Hong Kong head office, branches in Singapore, Malaya and India. In 1920 he became the chief accountant of the head office in Hong Kong and later on was appointed assistant sub-manager and sub-manager.

During his time as sub-manager he was appointed to various government offices. Between 1927 and 1928, the government issued five million Hong Kong dollars of bonds for supporting public works in Hong Kong under the Public Works Loan Ordinance of 1927. A board was set up and Grayburn was appointed as a member under the chairmanship of J. H. Kemp and C. G. Alabaster to consider application and to allot the bonds.

He was also made Justice of the Peace on 27 May 1927, member of the advisory committee of the Hong Kong Volunteer Defence Corps from June 1928 to May 1929 and member of the court of the University of Hong Kong from April 1930.

== HSBC chief manager ==
=== Stabilisation of Hong Kong dollar ===
V. M. Grayburn acted as chief manager of the HSBC in March 1930 in succession to retiring A. C. Hynes and was officially appointed by the board in July. During his spell as chief manager, he oversaw the Hong Kong dollar abandoned silver standard and became a distinct unit of currency.

By 1935, only China and Hong Kong remained on silver standard and so the exchange rate of Hong Kong dollar declined significantly due to the fall of the international silver price after the Great Depression. The government appointed V. M. Grayburn and several local merchants, bankers and brokers to a committee of enquiry for financial advices.

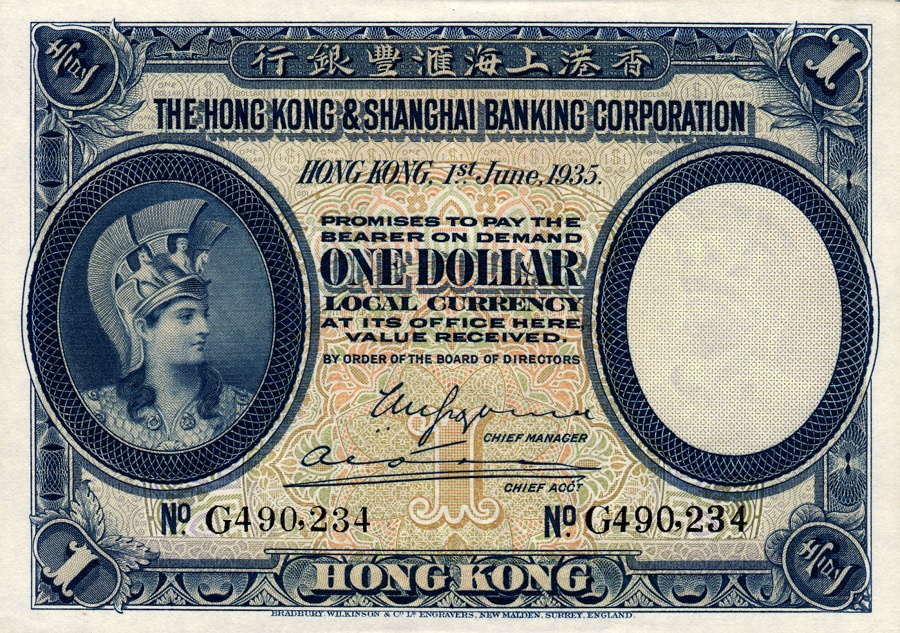
A one dollar Hong Kong banknote issued on 1 June 1935 with signature of chief manager V. M. Grayburn and chief accountant Arthur Morse.

Although Hong Kong's trade was benefited shortly from the decline of Hong Kong dollar, the exchange rate went up again after the pound sterling, Japanese yen and US dollar significantly devalued after they were taken off from the gold standard and Hong Kong's trade was damaged heavily.

The US Silver Purchase Act of 1934 also created an intolerable demand on China's silver coins and pushed up the global silver price. V. M. Grayburn was appointed member of the Economic Commission to advise Governor William Peel on the monetary issues in July 1934. The report of the commission in February 1935 concluded the Hong Kong government should not abandon the silver standard as China, the colony's largest trading partner remained on it.

The Chinese Nationalist government announced the abandonment of the silver standard in November 1935 due to the instability of the currency. The Hong Kong government followed China shortly afterward. The Dollar Currency Notes Ordinance of 1935 was passed by the Legislative Council on 9 November. Despite the currency coins and notes issued by the Hong Kong government, the currency notes issued by the HSBC and two other British banks in Hong Kong were also recognised as legal tenders in Hong Kong. Under the Exchange Fund Ordinance of 1935, the HSBC had to submit its silver holdings in exchange for the Certificates of Indebtedness, as the legal backing for all banknotes. In December 1935, the government appointed Grayburn a member of the Exchange Fund Advisory Committee, to continue to advise the government on monetary issues. For his services for the establishment of the Hong Kong dollar as the monetary unit, Grayburn was knighted in May 1937 in honour of the coronation of George VI, which made him the second chief manager of the HSBC to receive the honour after Sir Thomas Jackson, 1st Baronet.

=== New headquarters building ===
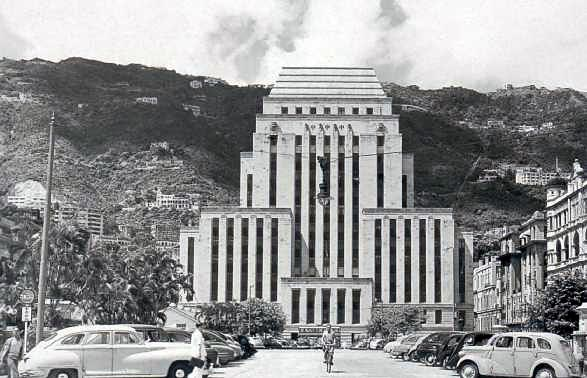
The new HSBC headquarters building in 1936.

V. M. Grayburn was also responsible for the construction of the new headquarters building of the HSBC in Central, Hong Kong. In 1930 when he was appointed chief manager in 1930, he already saw the 46-year-old main building was too small for the development of the bank.

The plan for a new headquarters building were finalised in 1931. The office was moved out on 10 October 1933 and the construction was taken place at the same site of the torn down old building. M. V. Grayburn was the head of the plan while the chief accountant Arthur Morse was responsible for the budget. The new building was designed by architect G. L. Wilson from the Palmer and Turner. The new 13-storey building was 70 metres high in Art Deco style with granite façade was opened on 10 October 1935 and became the most advanced and remarkable commercial building in the Far East at the time. It was also the first building in Hong Kong with installed air-conditioner. The new building was the third generation headquarters building of the bank and remained for the next 46 years until was replaced by the current one at the same site in 1981.

=== Eve of the war ===
After the outbreak of the Second Sino-Japanese War in July 1937 and the Second World War in September 1939, the Hong Kong government set up the Taxation Committee for raising new tax in preparation for the war. The committee, in which V. M. Grayburn was part, concluded an income tax would be the best new tax to be introduced however remained in reservations for the legitimacy of the taxation. The Income Tax Bill was subsequently passed in the Legislative Council despite strong opposition from the unofficial members and the business community.

While he was the chief manager of the HSBC, Grayburn helped found the China Fleet Club and donated $25,000 for building the club's new headquarters in the name of the bank. He also assisted the Royal Hong Kong Yacht Club to move from North Point to Kellett Island where the club locates today. He was the chairman of the board of the Matilda Memorial & War Hospital and set up a $500,000 fund for the hospital.

He was appointed the unofficial member of the Executive Council in July 1941. He held the office until the fall of Hong Kong to the Japanese army in December. Before Hong Kong was occupied, V. M. Grayburn had already appointed Arthur Morse to the London office and transferred Bank's assets to London supported by the British government. The bank had also a large amount of US dollar reserve in the United States to avoid its assets being frozen if the Hong Kong office was fallen into Japanese's hand. In 1941 the British government appointed Morse as acting chief manager and chairman and commanded all branches of HSBC to follow orders from London. 12 December 1941, Hong Kong Governor Mark Young announced London to replace Hong Kong as the headquarters of the bank. The Hong Kong government surrendered to Japan on Christmas Day of 1941.

== Japanese occupation ==
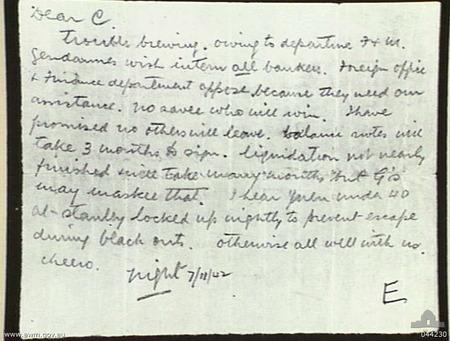
A confidential letter from V. M. Grayburn to Douglas Clague, member of the British Army Aid Group in November 1942.

After the Hong Kong government's surrender, J. J. Paterson, the chairman of the HSBC, Sir V. M. Grayburn and his successor D. C. Edmondston and other Britons in Hong Kong were in the hands of Japanese army. Grayburn and his wife were sent to a hotel in Central and he was forced to help the Japanese bank Yokohama Specie Bank take over the HSBC.

The Japanese army took over the bank's main building as headquarters of the Japanese military government and acquired large amount of unsigned banknotes from the bank's reserve. Sir V. M. Grayburn was forced to sign and issue the currency. Although the British government had declared the HSBC's banknotes issued by the Japanese government as invalid and disclosed their serial numbers through the Chinese government's radio, those banknotes were still widely used in Hong Kong and neighbouring regions. An estimated total of 119 million Hong Kong dollars was issued by the HSBC during the Japanese occupation.

Sir V. M. Grayburn joined the resistance activities associated with the British Army Aid Group (BAAG), a Southern China-based para-military organisation formed mainly by Britons who escaped from Hong Kong aiming to assist prisoners of war to escape from the Japanese army's POW camps. Two assistants of Grayburn, T. J. J. Fenwick and J. A. D. Morrison successfully escaped from Hong Kong with the help of the BAAG. However Grayburn decided to stay for his wife and assisted the BAAG by providing it information in Hong Kong.

== Death ==
To help the British civilians in the Stanley Internment Camp, Grayburn assisted in raising money for them so they could buy extra rations from official canteens and the black market. Grayburn asked Dr. Harry Talbot to smuggle cash back into the camp when he was sent out from Stanley for treatment at the French Hospital but was caught by the Kempeitai. Grayburn and his assistant Edward Streatfield went to the Foreign Affairs Office and confessed he was responsible for the smuggling and money-raising operations. Grayburn and Streatfield were arrested two weeks later on 17 April 1943 and taken to the Happy Valley Gendarmerie. Grayburn was sentenced to one hundred days or three months in the Stanley Prison.

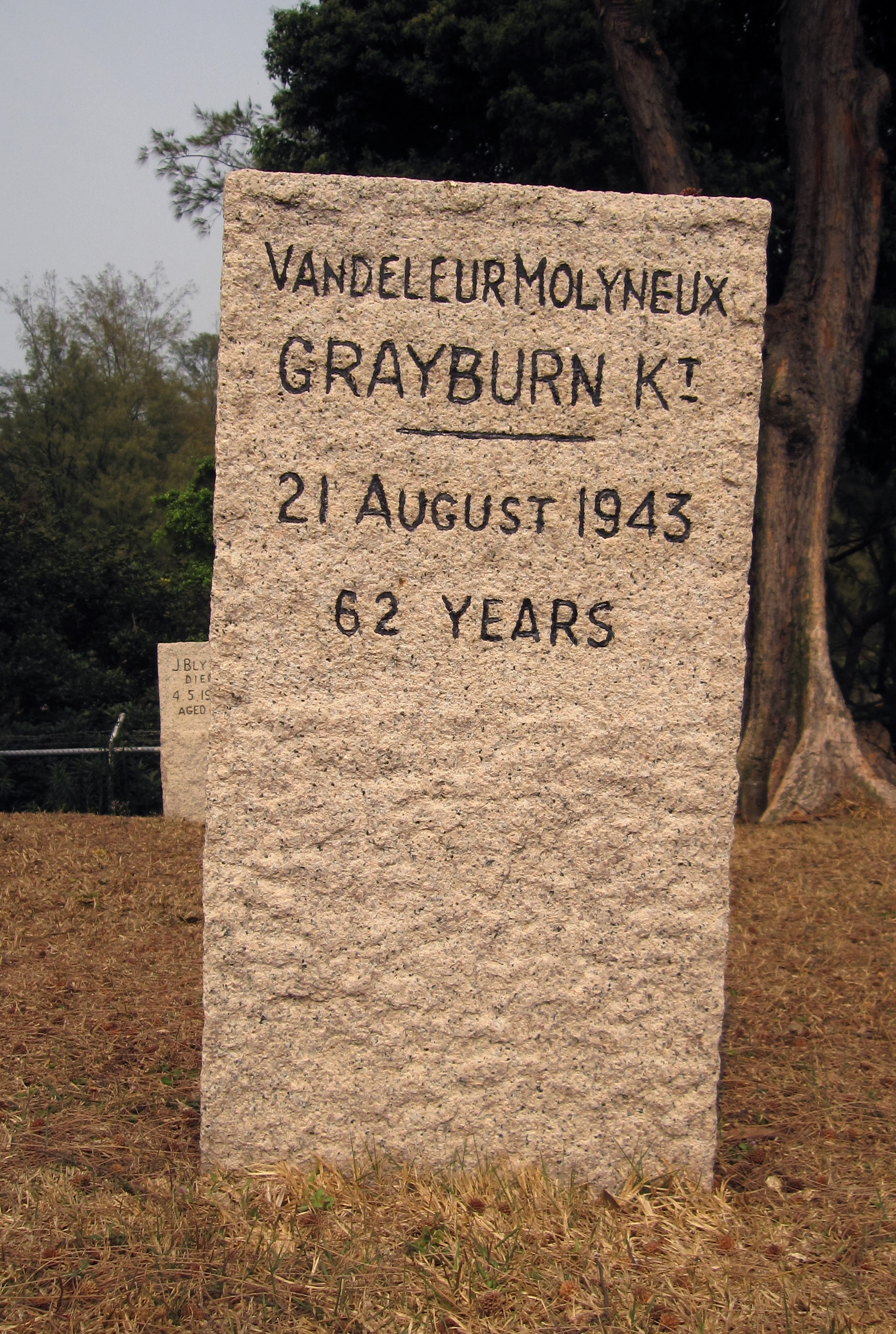
Tomb of V. M. Grayburn at the Stanley Military Cemetery.

For the first half of his sentence he remained in good health. Beginning from 16 August 1943 he complained about a slight fever and a loss of appetite. His condition deteriorated and was sent to the Prison hospital on 18 August. Khader Bux, an Indian warder, acted as a medical officer, applied to the Japanese authorities four times for a doctor but none was sent. Dr. Harry Talbot, who was also sent to the same prison, diagnosed a high fever and was slightly delirious on 20 August. Although Bux managed to get some sulphonamide tablets smuggled in for the patient, Grayburn was already comatose on 21 August. He died at about 7.30 p.m. on Saturday, 21 August at the age of 62. He was buried at today's Stanley Military Cemetery. Streatfield wrote on Grayburn's death:

At no time had he ever been seen by a Japanese doctor. There was no doubt whatever of the great regret of the bulk of the Indian warders and several of them expressed their resentment at the attitude of the Japanese in not affording him qualified medical aid. The ‘M.O.’, in particular, had done everything his limited power and ability enabled him to do.

The cause of Sir V. M. Grayburn's death was controversial. On 15 September 1943, the Colonial Office wrote to the HSBC in London with news of the death and, basing itself on Red Cross reports, gave the cause as "avitaminosis", while Emily Hahn, an American journalist and also friend of Grayburn said she had heard from the Gendarmes said "with amazing candor that he had died of beriberi". There was a medical examination when his body was returned to Stanley Camp, but the doctors refused to reach a verdict because of the advanced state of decomposition. Dr. Talbot, the last doctor to see him before his death told the war crimes trial that Grayburn died of septicaemia as there were no sulphonamide (anti-bacterial) drugs administered which could have saved him. The war crimes trial in 1947 found Dr. Saito Chuichi, the medical officer of the Stanley Prison guilty for Grayburn's death and Saito was sentenced to eight years in prison.

Before Grayburn's death, the Privy Council had made an Order in Council to appoint Arthur Morse as the official chief manager on 13 January 1943.

== Personal life ==
V. M. Grayburn had three marriages. He married Ruth Danvers Higgs at the Saint Andrew's Cathedral, Singapore on 12 April 1917. After his first wife died, he married Minnie Doris Robson and had a son and a daughter, John Robson and Elizabeth. The marriage lasted until 1939 when they divorced. Grayburn then married his third wife Muriel Mary Mellor, daughter of C. B. Mellor of Chester. Muriel Mary Grayburn was also sent to the Stanley Internment Camp when her husband was sent to the Stanley Prison. She survived the Japanese occupation.

Grayburn was enthusiastic in sports and played golf, tennis, racing and rugby. He was a centre three-quarter rugger for Shanghai and the Interport match against Tientsin in 1907 and figured in inter-club matches in Hong Kong in 1912 and 1913.

His racial views were a product of his class and era. In a letter, in 1937, he stated that the British HSBC workers should not marry non-Britons, and "foreign, native, half-caste are definitely taboo". Some also said he had said the Matilda Memorial & War Hospital was built for whites only when he was the chairman of the hospital's board.

Business positions
| Preceded by A. C. Hynes | Chief Manager of Hongkong and Shanghai Banking Corporation; 1930–1943 | Succeeded by Arthur Morse |
