= Thomas Ernest Pearce =

British businessman (1883–1941)

Thomas Ernest Pearce (19 February 1883 – 19 December 1941) was a British businessman and member of the Legislative Council of Hong Kong.

Pearce was born on 19 February 1883. His father, Rev. Thomas William Pearce, O.B.E, LL.D. spent nearly half a century working in China as a missionary and translator, and was closely associated with the educational development in Hong Kong. Pearce went to boarding school in Blackheath, South London, from 1896 to 1899; he attended the School for the Sons of Missionaries, the predecessor of Eltham College, where he excelled in cricket and rugby. When in 1912 the school moved to its current site, in Mottingham, South London, Pearce donated the Blackheath Cup, which is still awarded for all-round sporting excellence.

After joining trading company J. D. Hutchison & Co. in 1903, Pearce acquired a controlling share in the company from John Duflon Hutchison in 1917. He took into partnership with P. S. Cassidy in 1922 and set up a branch office in Canton in 1929 which ceased to operate in 1941. He was also director and chairman of the Hong Kong and Shanghai Banking Corporation and many other public companies.

Pearce was made Justice of the Peace in 1921 and was appointed member of the Court of the University of Hong Kong in 1929. He was also appointed member of the Legislative Council in March 1939 until Japan invaded Hong Kong in 1941. He was a member of the Hong Kong Defence Reserve. During the Battle of Hong Kong, he was killed in the fight alongside the Volunteers' Special Guard Company nicknamed the Hugheseliers and the Methuseliers consisting of group of older men to defend the North Point Power Station.

Pearce was a sportsman and played cricket for Hong Kong. He was also the chairman of the Hong Kong Jockey Club from 1940 to 1941. He had two sons, Thomas Alexander Pearce and J. L. C. Pearce. Thomas Alexander Pearce was also a professional cricketer.

Business positions
Preceded by John D. Hutchison	Chairman of John D. Hutchison & Co. 1917–1941	Succeeded by P. S. Cassidy
Preceded by J. J. Paterson	Chairman of the Hongkong and Shanghai Banking Corporation; 1933–1934	Succeeded by C. Gordon Mackie
Preceded by G. Miskin	Chairman of the Hongkong and Shanghai Banking Corporation; 1938–1939	Succeeded by A. L. Shields
Legislative Council of Hong Kong
Preceded by J. J. Paterson	Unofficial Member; 1939–1941	Japanese occupation of Hong Kong
Sporting positions
Preceded by M .T. Johnson	Chairman of the Hong Kong Jockey Club; 1940–1941	Japanese occupation of Hong Kong
