= Arthur Morse =

British banker (1892-1967)

Sir Arthur Morse
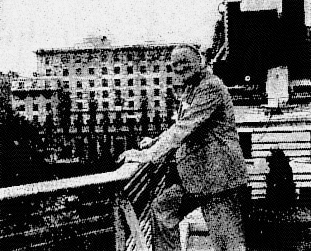
- Arthur Morse
- Born: 25 April 1892; Bohercrowe, County Tipperary, Ireland
- Died: 13 May 1967 (aged 75)
- Education: Foyle College, Derry
- Occupation: Banker

Sir Arthur Morse KBE JP (Chinese: 摩士) (25 April 1892 – 13 May 1967) was the head of The Hongkong and Shanghai Banking Corporation during and after World War II. He was a British banker born in County Tipperary in Ireland. He worked in Shanghai, London and Tientsin and finally many years in Hong Kong. He rebuilt HSBC and did much to revive Hong Kong after the war, retired in 1953 and moved to London where he died in 1967.

Morse was born in 1892 in Bohercrowe, County Tipperary, Ireland and his father Digby Scott Morse was a Bank of Ireland agent. and Lizzie Jane Holmes.

Morse attended Foyle College in Derry, before embarking on his banking career with HSBC.

== Career ==
=== HSBC ===
By 1940, Hong Kong was under the threat of Japanese invasion with the majority of branches in East Asia already in the hands of the Japanese. Morse was sent to London by the then-Chief Manager of the bank, Sir Vandeleur Grayburn, to lead the bank and shift the headquarters to London to avoid the reserves being frozen in New York and San Francisco by the American authorities in the case of a Japanese take over in Hong Kong. On 16 December 1941, 9 days before Japanese occupation, Morse was appointed as the Commissioner and General Manager of the bank.

During the war, most of the staff in the Far East became prisoners of war and hundreds of them died. The Chief Manager, Sir Vandeleur Grayburn and his designated successor David C Edmondston died whilst prisoners in Hong Kong.

In 1943, the London Advisory Committee were empowered to act as a Board of Directors and he became the Chairman and Chief Manager of the bank.

In 1946, he moved the headquarters of the bank back to Hong Kong and the bank resumed its role as the central bank in Hong Kong. He involved himself in the revival of the infrastructure of the city, as well as the bank, his success in the latter task shown by the improving financial position of the bank starting a trend which continued after the end of his service in the bank in 1953.

His was succeeded by Sir Michael Turner. Turner had been interned in Singapore at Changi Prison during the war.

=== Public services ===
Arthur Morse participated many public bodies in Hong Kong and was an unofficial member of the Executive Council of Hong Kong during his stay in Hong Kong after the war. In 1945, Morse supported a failed move to establish a popularly elected Municipal Council in the colony. Morse was knighted for his service to the colony in 1949.

== Places and buildings named after him ==
- Morse Park
- Morse Hut and Morse House, headquarters of The Scout Association of Hong Kong

Business positions
Preceded by J. J. Paterson	Chairman of Hongkong and Shanghai Banking Corporation; 1941–1953	Succeeded by Cedric Blaker
Preceded by Sir Vandeleur Grayburn	Chief Manager of Hongkong and Shanghai Banking Corporation; 1943–1953	Succeeded by Sir Michael Turner
Sporting positions
Preceded by P. Tester	Chairman of the Hong Kong Jockey Club; 1946–1952	Succeeded by D. Benson
