= D. G. M. Bernard =

British businessman and Hong Kong politician (1888–1975)

Sir Dallas Bernard Bt

Chairman of the Hongkong and Shanghai Banking Corporation
- In office 1926–1928
- Preceded by: A. O. Lang
- Succeeded by: A. H. Compton

Personal details
- Born: Dallas Gerald Mercer Bernard; 22 March 1888
- Died: 26 November 1975 (aged 87)
- Spouse: Betty Addis (after 1922)
- Education: Stubbington House School; Thames Nautical Training College

Sir Dallas Gerald Mercer Bernard, 1st Baronet (22 March 1888 – 26 November 1975) was a British banker who served as Chairman of the Hongkong and Shanghai Banking Corporation from 1926 to 1928.

== Early life ==
Bernard was born on 22 March 1888. Bernards's parents were Edmund Bowen Bernard and Arabella Margaret Piercy. Bernard studied at Stubbington House School in Fareham, Hampshire, England.

After Bernard held the rank of midshipman in the Royal Navy, he attended Thames Nautical Training College in Foots Cray Place, Kent.

== Career ==
Bernard arrived in the Far East and joined Jardine, Matheson & Co. by at least 1912, at which point he was working there as an assistant. He was chairman of the trustees of the Sailors' Home and on the Local General Committee of the Missions to Seamen in Hong Kong in the 1920s. He was the managing director of Jardine Matheson from 1928 to 1942. Bernard was also director of other companies such as the Chinese Central Railways between 1928 and 1942 and the Alliance Assurance Company between 1931 and 1942. Bernard was also the chairman of the Hongkong and Shanghai Banking Corporation. During his time in Hong Kong he was appointed Unofficial Member of the Executive Council in 1926 and 1927 and Legislative Council in 1926. He was on the Legislative Council's Standing Law Committee.

Bernard became the director of the Bank of England from 1936 to 1949 and the High Sheriff of the County of London from 1942 to 1943 and later on the Lieutenant of the City of London. After the war, he continued to serve the bank and rose to the deputy governor of the Bank of England in 1949 until 1954 when he left the bank.

After leaving the Bank of England, Bernard joined the Courtaulds and became the director between 1954 and 1956 and between 1964 and 1965 and also the deputy-chairman from 1956 to 1962. He was also active in banking in the Middle East. In 1954, he was appointed chairman of the Jordan Currency Board, which became the sole authority entitled to issue Jordanian dinar. He held the post until 1957 and continued as the chairman of the British Bank of the Middle East from 1954 until 1965.

He was created 1st Baronet Bernard, of Snakemoor, in the County of Southampton on 27 January 1954.

== Personal life ==
Bernard married Elizabeth "Betty" Addis, daughter of Sir Charles Stewart Addis and Elizabeth Jane McIsaac on 16 November 1922. Bernard died on 26 November 1975 at age 87. Bernard and his wife have three children: Elizabeth Piercy Bernard (10 April 1924 – 29 November 1981), Sir Dallas Bernard, 2nd Bt. (born 14 December 1926), and Margaret Anne Bernard (6 June 1929 – 7 October 2010).

Legislative Council of Hong Kong
Preceded by Percy Hobson Holyoak	Unofficial Member; Representative for Hong Kong General Chamber of Commerce; 1926–1927	Succeeded by John Owen Hughes
Preceded by Herbert William Bird	Unofficial Member; 1927–1928	Succeeded by William Edward Leonard Shenton
Political offices
Preceded by Henry Edward Pollock	Unofficial Member of the Executive Council of Hong Kong; 1926	Succeeded by Henry Edward Pollock
Preceded by Archibald Orr Lang	Unofficial Member of the Executive Council of Hong Kong; 1927	Succeeded by William Edward Leonard Shenton
Business positions
Preceded by A. O. Lang	Chairman of the Hongkong and Shanghai Banking Corporation; 1926–1928	Succeeded by A. H. Compton
Honorary titles
Preceded by Edward Holland-Martin	High Sheriff of the County of London; 1943–1944	Succeeded by John Coldbrook Hanbury-Williams
Baronetage of the United Kingdom
New creation	Baronet (of Snakemoor); 1954–1975	Succeeded by Dallas Bernard
