= William Shenton =

Sir William Shenton

Unofficial Member of the Executive Council of Hong Kong
- In office 1 June 1927 – 1927
- Appointed by: Sir Cecil Clementi
- Preceded by: Henry Pollock
- Succeeded by: Henry Pollock
- In office 3 April 1928 – 4 April 1936
- Appointed by: Sir Cecil Clementi; Sir William Peel
- Preceded by: D. G. M. Bernard
- Succeeded by: J. J. Paterson

Unofficial Member of the Legislative Council of Hong Kong
- In office 1 June 1927 – 1927
- Appointed by: Sir Cecil Clementi
- Preceded by: Henry Pollock
- Succeeded by: Henry Pollock
- In office 3 April 1928 – 4 April 1936
- Appointed by: Sir Cecil Clementi; Sir William Peel
- Preceded by: D. G. M. Bernard
- Succeeded by: S. H. Dodwell

Personal details
- Born: 18 March 1885 Morestead, Hampshire, England
- Died: 20 November 1967 (aged 82) Isle of Wight, England
- Occupation: Solicitor

Sir William Edward Leonard Shenton (18 March 1885 – 20 November 1967) was an English solicitor who worked in Hong Kong.

Born in Morestead near Winchester, he was the son of William Shenton and Eleanor Johnson. He went to the Northgate School at St. Thomas, Hampshire around 1901. He arrived in Hong Kong in 1908 and rose to the head of the well-known Hong Kong legal firm of Deacons. He was also the chairman of the Union Insurance Society of Canton.

He was appointed member of the Executive Council and Legislative Council of Hong Kong temporarily in 1927 and again from 1928, until his retirement and returned to England in 1936. He was also member of the legal sub-committee of the Hong Kong General Chamber of Commerce. He was made Knight Bachelor in the New Year Honours of 1923.

He married Erica Lucy Denison, daughter of civil engineer Albert Denison of Hong Kong. He had one son and one daughter. His daughter, Yvonne Eleanor Mutch Shenton, a keen horse woman, was married to Cecil Edward Sanford Barclay, son of Sir Colville Barclay.

He died in 1967 in Isle of Wight, England.

Legislative Council of Hong Kong
Preceded by Henry Edward Pollock	Unofficial Member for Justices of the Peace; 1927	Succeeded by Henry Edward Pollock
Preceded by Dallas Gerald Mercer Bernard	Unofficial Member; 1928–1936	Succeeded by Stanley Hudson Dodwell
Political offices
Preceded by Henry Edward Pollock	Provisional Unofficial Member of the Executive Council of Hong Kong; 1927	Succeeded by Henry Edward Pollock
Preceded by Dallas Gerald Mercer Bernard	Unofficial Member of the Executive Council of Hong Kong; 1928–1936	Succeeded by John Johnstone Paterson
