= John Owen Hughes =

- Born: 1881
- Died: 4 February 1945 (aged 63–64); Stanley Internment Camp, Japanese Occupied Hong Kong
- Spouse: Frances Isabel Oakley
- Children: Harry Owen Hughes

John Owen Hughes (1881 – 4 February 1945) was a British businessman in Hong Kong and member of the Executive Council and Legislative Council of Hong Kong.

== Career ==
J. Owen Hughes was a well-known British expatriate in Hong Kong in the colonial period. He was the head of the Harry Wicking & Co. He was also appointed member of the board of the Union Insurance Society of Canton in 1927. He joined the Hong Kong General Chamber of Commerce and became an active member in the Chamber. He served on the committee of the Chamber from 1921 to 1931 and in 1924 he was elected the Chairman of the Chamber in succession to D. G. M. Bernard. He had also been Chairman of the Metals Sub-Committee for years.

Owen Hughes was the representative of the Chamber on the Legislative Council from 1927 to 1931. He was elected in May 1927 to take place from the chairman of the Chamber D. G. M. Bernard as the representative of the Chamber. He resigned from the committee and the representation of the Chamber of Commerce on the Legislative Council from 25 April 1931. He was again appointed to the Legislative Council temporarily in May 1934 during Henry Pollock on leave.

He was appointed to the Executive Council on several occasions, in May and October 1928 and in July 1930 for Henry Pollock.

Among others he was also member of the Licensing Board and the Authorized Architects' Committee.

During his stay in Hong Kong, Owen Hughes joined the Victoria Lodge of the Freemasonry and became the Master. In August 1926, appointed the District Grand Master of English Freemasonry for Hong Kong and South China, in succession to P. H. Hoyoak who deceased.

== Death and family ==
He was married to Frances Isabel Oakley, daughter of H. G. Oakley of Berkhamsted, Hertfordshire. The wedding took place at St. John's Cathedral, Hong Kong on 7 December 1929 and was attended by Governor Cecil Clementi.

John Owen Hughes' son Harry Owen Hughes was a well-known cricketer in Hong Kong.

He was held as prisoner of war at the Stanley Internment Camp during the Japanese occupation of Hong Kong and died in February 1945.

Legislative Council of Hong Kong
Preceded by Dallas Gerald Mercer Bernard	Unofficial Member; Representative for Hong Kong General Chamber of Commerce; 1927–1931	Succeeded by Charles Gordon Stewart Mackie
Preceded by Henry Edward Pollock	Unofficial Member; 1934	Succeeded by Henry Edward Pollock
Political offices
Preceded by Henry Edward Pollock	Provisional Unofficial Member of the Executive Council of Hong Kong; 1928	Succeeded by Henry Edward Pollock
Preceded by Henry Edward Pollock	Provisional Unofficial Member of the Executive Council of Hong Kong; 1928	Succeeded by Henry Edward Pollock
Preceded by Henry Edward Pollock	Provisional Unofficial Member of the Executive Council of Hong Kong; 1930–1931	Succeeded by Henry Edward Pollock
