= Morestead =

Village and parish in Hampshire, England

Coordinates: 51.0262°N 1.2746°W

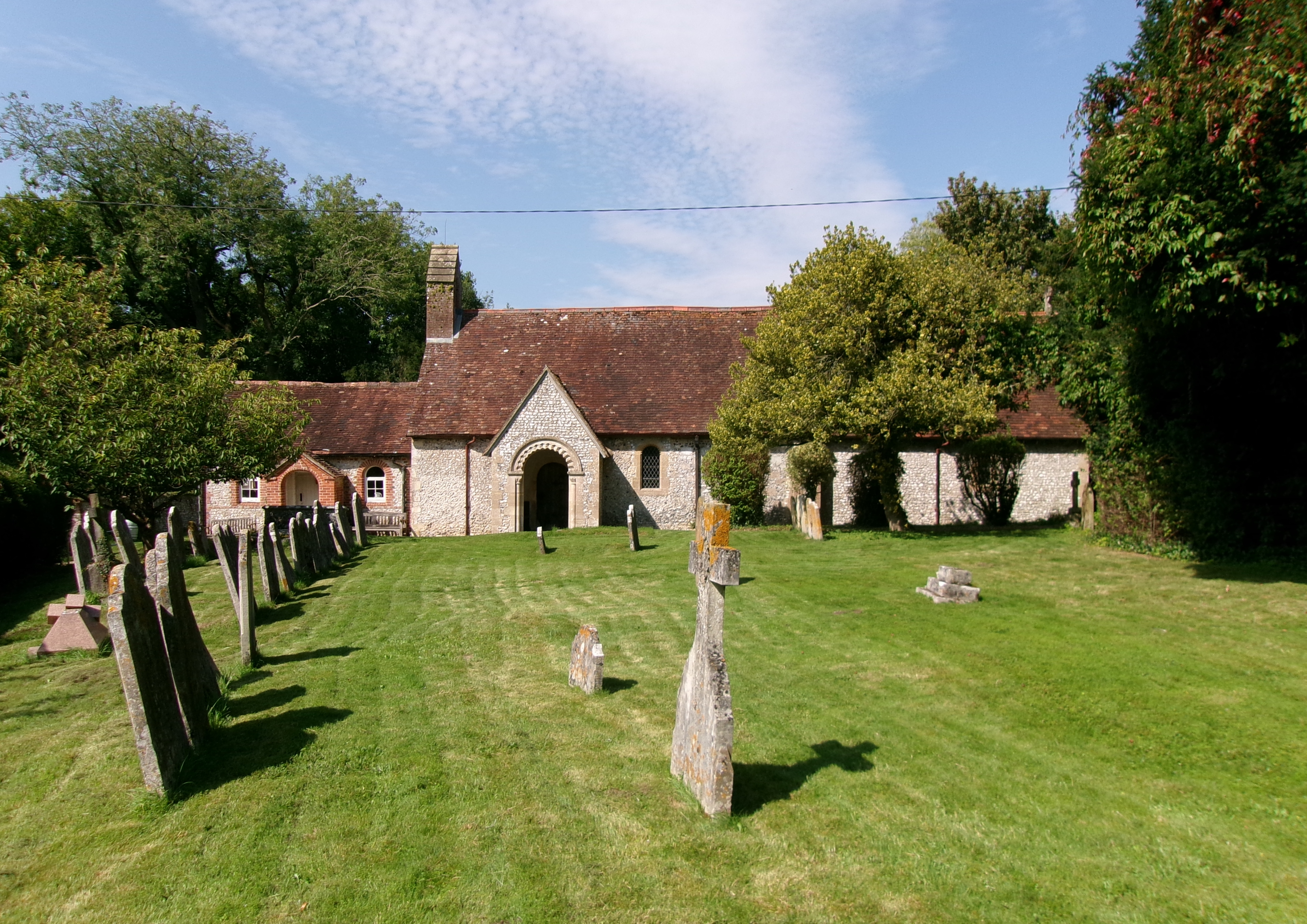
- Morestead parish church

- Location within Hampshire
- OS grid reference: SU5025
- Civil parish: Owslebury
- District: Winchester
- Shire county: Hampshire
- Region: South East
- Country: England
- Sovereign state: United Kingdom
- Post town: Winchester
- Postcode district: SO24
- Dialling code: 01962
- Police: Hampshire and Isle of Wight
- Fire: Hampshire and Isle of Wight
- Ambulance: South Central
- UK Parliament: Winchester
- Website: Owslebury & Morestead Parish

Morestead is a village and former civil parish, now in the parish of Owslebury, in the Winchester district, in Hampshire, England. It is in the South Downs, about 3 miles (5 km) southeast of Winchester. In 1931 the parish had a population of 96. On 1 April 1932 the parish was abolished and merged with Owslebury.

The village lies on rising downland adjacent to the ancient Roman road from Portchester to Winchester.

Morestead is predominantly a farming community and there are racehorse training stables.

The ancient Parish Church has no known dedication. Parts of the structure date from around 1150 while the font dates from around 1200. The church underwent an extensive rebuild in 1873.

Next to the church is the former rectory built in the mid 1830s.
