= Dodwell & Co. =

British merchant firm

- House flag
- Type: Private
- Founder: George Benjamin Dodwell; A.J.H. Carlill
- Headquarters: London, United Kingdom

George Benjamin Dodwell (1851–1925)

Dodwell & Co. (Chinese: 天祥洋行) or Dodwell's, was one of the leading British merchant firms, or hongs, active in China and Japan during the 19th and 20th century. It was a direct rival to Jardine, Matheson & Co.

== History ==
=== W.R. Adamson and Company – The forerunner of Dodwell & Co. ===
The forerunner of Dodwell & Co., W.R. Adamson and Company, was founded as a result of the efforts of a group of Cheshire weavers who needed to increase supplies of raw silk for their mills. On their behalf, William R. Adamson arrived in Shanghai in 1852. In 1858 he set up his own firm, W.R. Adamson and Company, in London, with its head office in Shanghai and branches in Hong Kong, Fuzhou and Hankou. It was the first of the British merchant firms to venture into Japan, opening a branch in Yokohama in the early 1860s. W.R. Adamson and Company built up an export business in tea and silk, and also a general import business, and began to acquire shipping agencies. The name changed in 1867 to Adamson, Bell and Company, when Frederick Hayley Bell joined the company.

In 1872, the firm appointed a shipping clerk in its Shanghai office named George Benjamin Dodwell (1851–1925). He was 20 years old, born in Derby and quickly rose to prominence in the company, playing an important part in its expansion throughout the Far East. By 1876 Adamson Bell and Company's tea shipments were only marginally behind those of Jardine, Matheson & Co and Butterfield and Swire. Dodwell also secured in 1887 the agency for chartering and managing ships on behalf of the Canadian Pacific Railway between Hong Kong and Vancouver (Canada), thus establishing the first regular steamship line across the Pacific.

=== The formation of Dodwell & Co. and its expansion till the Second World War ===

When in 1886 Adamson decided to retire and return to England he also withdrew his capital and Bell was left in control. Because of the lack of the former cash resources and the practical experience of Adamson the company soon ran into severe financial difficulties and faced bankruptcy from March 1890. Dodwell, together with A.J.H. Carlill, saw their chance to take over the business activities of their moribund employer and formed Dodwell, Carlill and Company on 1 May 1891. The head office of the new company was set up in London.

In 1898 George Benjamin Dodwell and his partners decided to transform the business into a Private Limited Liability Company. From 1 January 1899 the company began to operate as Dodwell & Company Limited with a capital of £500,000. By its articles Dodwell was elected Chairman for life. The same year he retired from the East and returned to London. There George Benjamin Dodwell not just oversaw the further development of Dodwell & Co. but diversified his business activities and was chairman of the Malacca Rubber Plantation Company.

From the turn of the century on to the First World War, tea sales declined and general merchandising and the shipping agencies became more important.

Japan also became more important to the company. Dodwell & Co. acted as the exclusive agent for the chartering of ships by the Japanese government during the Russo-Japanese War of 1904–05. Its Japanese trading business expanded further through the export of coal to Singapore and Shanghai, and the shipment of Japanese straw braid from Kobe for Europe. Dodwell & Co. also helped with opening of the new port of Yokkaichi to further its export of Japanese porcelain. During the First World War Dodwell's shipping business boomed with the chartering, bunkering, and sale of Japanese steamers to the Allied powers. In 1919 Dodwell & Co. reached a peak of success. The capital of the company had doubled and the trading profit achieved record levels unsurpassed until 1947.

=== The inter-war period and the Second World War ===
The inter-war period was marked by grim economic conditions.

After the First World War the increasing success of Japanese companies in the struggle for a share of the world's trade, made it more interesting for them to deal directly with customers and suppliers in foreign countries. Middlemen import and export traders and ship charteres like Dodwell's had to adapt accordingly. In 1927 Dodwell & Co., now headed by Carlill after the death of his founding partner in 1925, decided to stop to trade on its own account. Instead Dodwell & Co. would act only as agent for other companies selling to Japanese buyers.

The decline of the value of the Chinese Dollar to zero and an ill judged investment in the Shanghai company Sanitas Mineral Water Factory in 1932 contributed to the substantial losses of Dodwell & Co. in the 1930s. At the same time the Shanghai tea trade was losing heavily. Between 1920 and 1938 Dodwell & Co. paid dividends just on three occasions (1923, 1937 and 1938). The company survived this difficult time only because it had built up a large reserve fund of nearly £300.000 during the prosperous first two decades of the twentieth century.

Only the recovery of most of the branches of Dodwell & Co. from 1938 onwards ensured that the company was well placed to face the upheavals of the Second World War, including shipping losses and the liquidation of their entire Japanese holdings by the authorities in 1941.

=== The post war years and the loss of independence ===

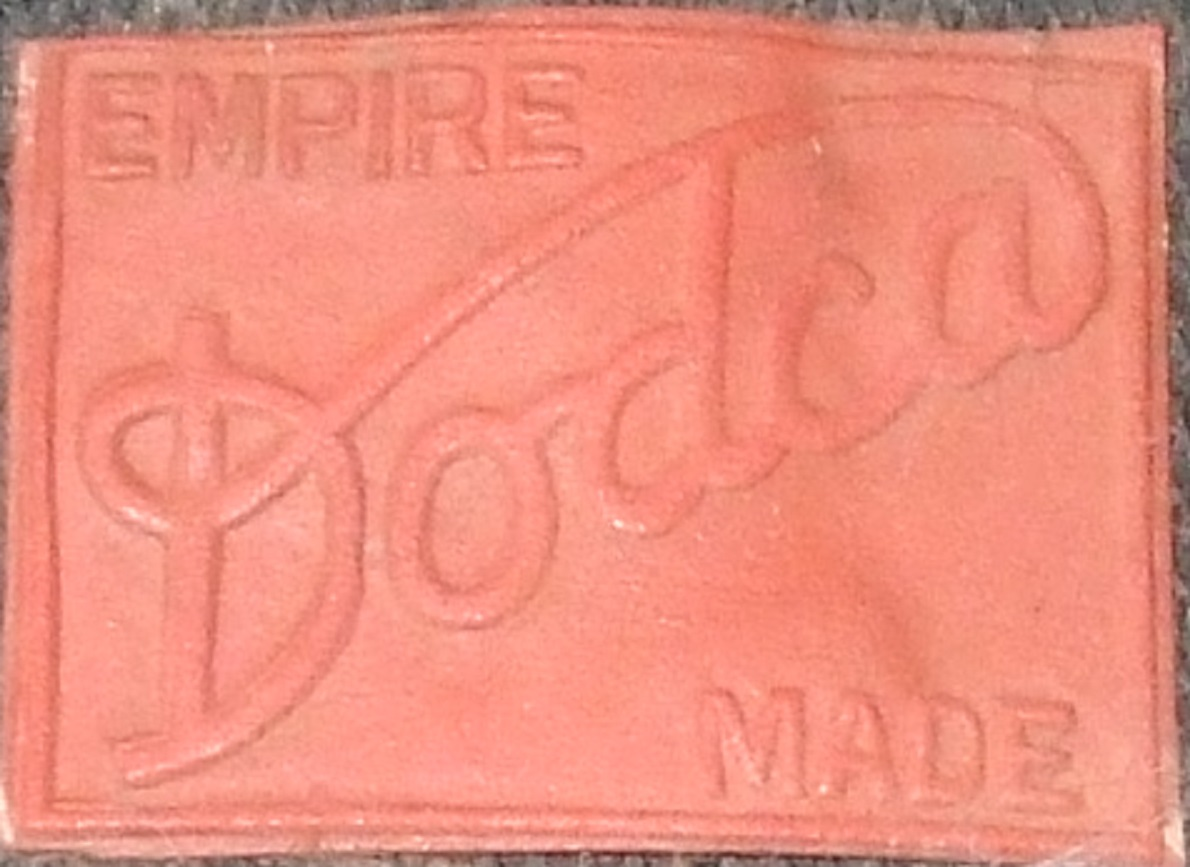
Label attached to Hong Kong rubber footwear distributed by Dodwell & Co.

Following the End of the Second World War, Dodwell's offices in Hong Kong and Japan had to be re-opened. As a consequence of the 1949 Chinese Revolution the company was forced to close down all branches in Mainland China. Dodwell & Co. had to look elsewhere overseas for new markets. Soon new branches were established in the Philippines, Australia, New Zealand and East Africa. Also in 1948, a joint venture was set up in India together with the Indian company Salem & Co., selling electrical equipment and steel tubing from Germany.

Post-war recovery in Hong Kong and Japan was rapid, and the company began to expand in new directions, including rubber and textiles. By way of example, Dodwell & Co. was one of the fifteen members of the Association of Hong Kong Rubber Footwear Importers, supplying wellingtons, ankle boots and plimsolls with distinctive red "Dodca Empire Made" rubber labels to British retail outlets during the 1950s and the early 1960s. The brand name "Dodca" appears to have derived from the surnames of the company's two founders Dodwell and Carlill, while Hong Kong rubber footwear manufacturers routinely labelled their exported products "Empire Made" before the 1970s.

Dodwell & Co. also expanded into motor vehicles. Dodwell Motors, a subsidiary, was formed in Hong Kong after the war. It amalgamated in 1969 with Inchcape's Metro cars to form Metro-Dodwell Motors Limited, which took over all British Leyland franchises in Hong Kong. From the mid-1950s, Dodwell & Co. specialised as buying agents for department and chain stores throughout the world, opening their own retail stores in some places, including Kenya and Hong Kong (franchise of Marks & Spencer and later BHS).

In 1972 the whole share capital of Dodwell & Co. Limited was acquired by Inchcape and Company Limited, which maintained Dodwell as a quasi-independent company for some time. Only when a combination of factors plunged Inchcape into its two most difficult years ever, 1994 and 1995, much of Dodwell & Co. was sold off in separate parts. In 1995 the buying agent business of Dodwell & Co. was sold as part of Inchcape Buying Services to the smaller competitor Li & Fung Ltd. (Hong Kong). The shipping service of Dodwell & Co. had been integrated into the newly formed Inchcape Shipping Services (ISS) in 1993, which was purchased by Electra Investment Trust Plc, a British investment group in 1999.

In January 2006 Electra sold ISS to Istithmar PJSC, a major investment house based in Dubai (United Arab Emirates). The extensive interests in business-machine trading in Hong Kong, Japan and many other Far Eastern countries, which Dodwell & Co had established by the 1970s, were also hived off. Inchcape, since 1999 solely focused on the sale of motor vehicles, only retained the motor car business of Dodwell & Co..

== Premises ==
Dodwell & Co. had its Head Office from 1891 to 1903 at "Dock House", Billiter Street and thereafter at 24, St. Mary Axe, both City of London (London, England).

== See also ==
- S. H. Dodwell
- History of Hong Kong
- History of Jardine, Matheson & Co.
- Inchcape plc
- Jardine, Matheson & Co
- List of trading companies
- The Hongs
