= Union Insurance Society of Canton =

The Union Insurance Society of Canton (commonly known as the Union) was a major Hong Kong–based insurance company regarded in the early 20th century as one of the four leading British businesses, or "hongs", of colonial Hong Kong alongside Hong Kong Shanghai Bank, Jardine Matheson and Swire.

By 1953 Union was the leading Hong Kong Insurance company, with assets of £14.4m, over five times that of the nearest local rival, Canton Insurance. In 1967 the Union was acquired by the Guardian Assurance Company which was itself acquired by Axa in 1999.

Notable employees and directors of the Union included William Keswick, William Shenton, Arthur William Hughes, A. O. Lang, Stanley Hudson Dodwell, Percy Hobson Holyoak and John Owen Hughes.

== History ==
The Union was founded in 1835 by Dent & Co to provide insurance for commercial cargoes in Canton following expiry of the East India Company monopoly over trade. Original subscribers are believed to have also included Jardine, Matheson & Co., Turner & Co. and Russell & Co. although early records did not survive the collapse of Dent in 1866. When the ports of Hong Kong opened in 1841, the Union moved its business operations from Macau to become the first insurer to be headquartered in the new colony. Until 1874 the company operated under a succession of limited terms of up to three years, each followed by a liquidation of assets to its members, a practice routed in its origins as a mutual assurance society.

The leadership of Nathaniel J. Ede as Secretary from 1871 to 1897 had a far reaching impact on the development of the Union. N. J. Ede led the introduction of new articles in 1873 which abandoned the requirement for a limited life and also its subsequent re-registration as a limited liability company under the Hong Kong Corporation Act of 1865–1881. Chalkley comments "The change from a short-term society of partners to a permanent corporation denoted not merely a change in legal form, it also betokened a change in the style of management." " We see in the society an early example of the "managerial revolution" which was to affect corporate establishments from that time to the present day. A merchant's mutual had become a corporation with a life of its own." The changes to the Society between 1873 and its re-registration in 1882 are an early example of demutualization. The entity registered on 24 October 1882 remains live with CR No. 0000011 and is one of the oldest limited liability entities in Hong Kong.

In its new legal form the Union expanded rapidly. It opened branch offices in London in 1874 and Melbourne in 1883, N.J. Ede's nephew Charles Montague Ede became the general manager of the company in 1908 in succession to W. J. Saunders. Under his leadership, the Union Insurance Society of Canton expanded as a global insurance company, opened up new branches at Tokyo, Hankow, Tientsin, Scurabaya, Bombay, Sydney, Adelaide, Brisbane, Perth, Auckland, Wellington, Christchurch, Vancouver, Toronto, Buenos Aires, Cario and Johannesburg and numerous other agencies. The company's assets expanded to $2 million in 1892 and $17M in 1914. and over £5m by 1924.

The Union acquired China Traders Insurance Co. in 1906, the China Fire Insurance co. in 1916 and the Yangtze Insurance Association in 1925. By 1920 the Union was the largest marine insurance company in the world.

The Union's former headquarters "Union House" occupied the site of the present day Chater House in Hong Kong.

Notable employees and directors of the Union included William Keswick, William Shenton, Arthur William Hughes, A. O. Lang, Stanley Hudson Dodwell, Percy Hobson Holyoak and John Owen Hughes

In 1967 the Union was acquired by the Guardian Assurance Company which was itself acquired by Axa in 1999.

== Bibliography ==
- Feng, Bangyan; Nyaw, Mee Kau (2010). Enriching Lives: A History of Insurance in Hong Kong, 1841–2010. Translated by Law, violet. Hong Kong University Press. ISBN 978-988-8028-70-2.
- Smith, Cades Alfred Middleton (1920). The British in China and Far Eastern trade. London: Constable.
