= Hong Kong Jockey Club =

Institution in Hong Kong

- 香港賽馬會

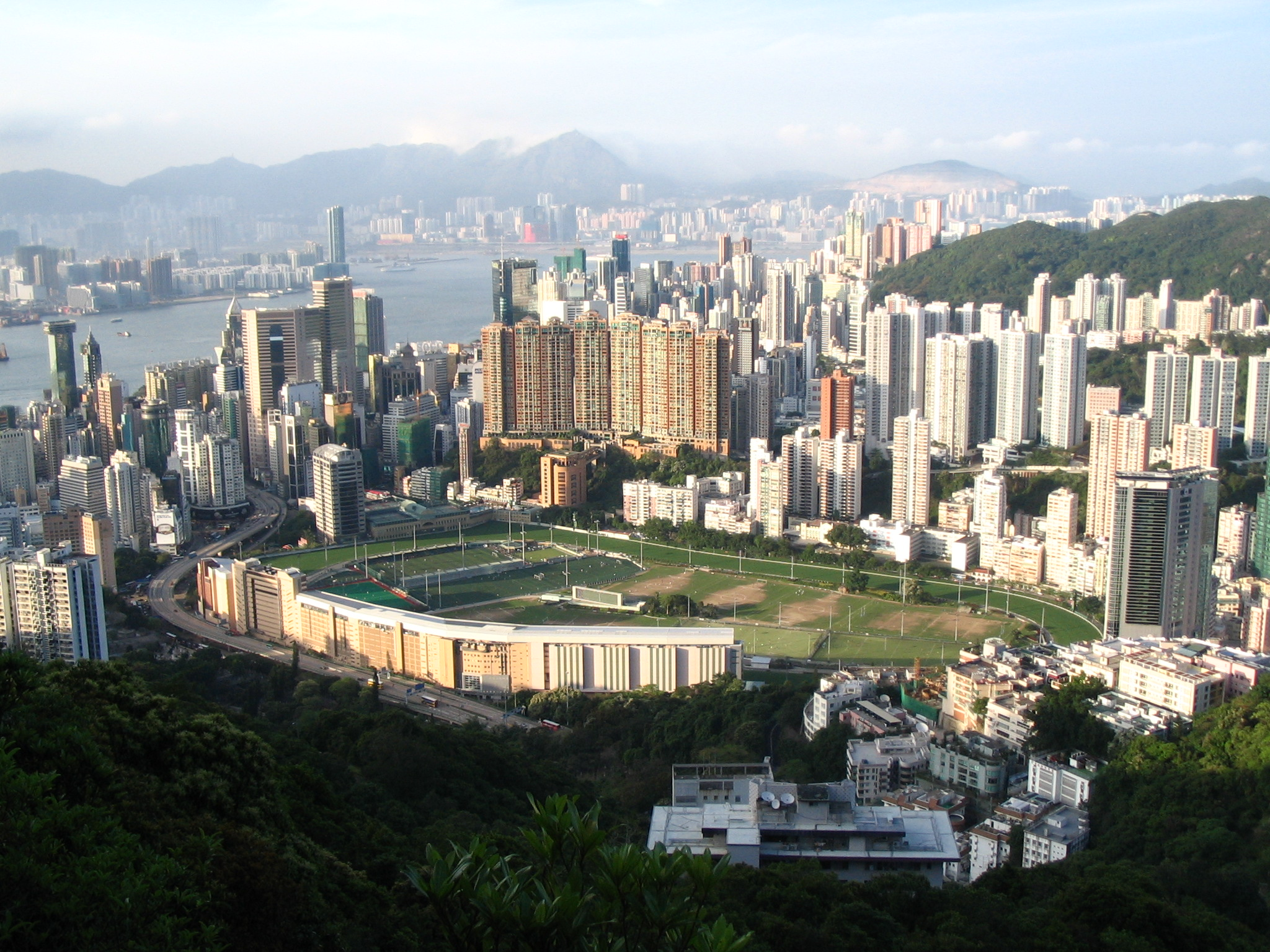
- Happy Valley Racecourse
- Abbreviation: HKJC
- Established: 4 November 1884; 142 years ago
- Type: Nonprofit
- Legal status: Corporate trust
- Headquarters: Happy Valley Racecourse, One Sports Road, Happy Valley, Hong Kong, China
- Coordinates: 22°16′22″N 114°10′56″E
- Region served: Hong Kong
- Official language: English; Chinese
- Chairman: The Hon Martin Liao
- Chief executive officer: Winfried Engelbrecht-Bresges
- Affiliations: Asian Racing Federation (Asia); International Federation of Horseracing Authorities (World)
- Website: hkjc.com

Hong Kong Jockey Club
- Traditional Chinese: 香港賽馬會
- Simplified Chinese: 香港赛马会
- Jyutping: Hoeng1 gong2 coi3 maa5 wui2
Transcriptions
Standard Mandarin
- Hanyu Pinyin: Xiānggǎng Sàimǎhuì
Yue: Cantonese
- Yale Romanization: Hēung góng choi máh wúi
- Jyutping: Hoeng1 gong2 coi3 maa5 wui2

Royal Hong Kong Jockey Club
- Traditional Chinese: 英皇御准香港賽馬會
- Simplified Chinese: 英皇御准香港赛马会
- Jyutping: Jing1 wong4 jyu6 zeon2 hoeng1 gong2 coi3 maa5 wui2
Transcriptions
Standard Mandarin
- Hanyu Pinyin: Yīng Huáng yù zhǔn Xiānggǎng Sàimǎhuì
Yue: Cantonese
- Yale Romanization: Yīng wòhng yuh jéun hēung góng choi máh wúi
- Jyutping: Jing1 wong4 jyu6 zeon2 hoeng1 gong2 coi3 maa5 wui2

The Hong Kong Jockey Club (HKJC) was founded in 1884 and is one of the oldest institutions in Hong Kong. In 1960, it was granted a royal charter and renamed the Royal Hong Kong Jockey Club. The institution reverted to its original name in 1996 in anticipation of the handover of Hong Kong in 1997. Membership of the club is by nomination and election.

It is a non-profit organisation providing horse racing, sporting and betting entertainment in Hong Kong. It holds a government-granted monopoly in providing pari-mutuel betting on horse racing, the Mark Six lottery, and fixed odds betting on overseas football events. The organisation is the largest taxpayer in Hong Kong, as well as the largest community benefactor and one of the city's major employers. In 2022/2023, The Hong Kong Jockey Club contributed a record HK$35.9 billion to the community. This comprised a record HK$28.6 billion in betting duty, profits tax and Lotteries Fund contributions, and HK$7.3 billion in approved charity donations. The club also proactively identifies, funds and develops projects which anticipate and address social issues and pressing needs in Hong Kong. The Hong Kong Jockey Club also provides dining, social, sport and recreation facilities to its approximately 23,000 members. Its Charities Trust is also one of the world's top ten charity donors.

== History ==
Founded in 1884 as an amateur body to promote horse racing, it was an exclusive club whose membership was drawn from the upper class with strict rules of membership, with women and people of unsuitable background being banned. This led to the club having no Chinese members until the 20th century.

In July 2005, a decision was made to stage equestrian competitions of the 2008 Summer Olympics in Hong Kong. The club's racing centre at Sha Tin was used as the foundation for the Olympic and Paralympic venues, with additional competition and training venues being incorporated into existing sports facilities at the Hong Kong Sports Institute, the Jockey Club Beas River Country Club and the adjacent golf course.

In January 2023, after Regina Ip proposed increasing taxes on the Jockey Club's football betting revenue, the Jockey Club said that the move would "destroy" its business model and jeopardize public interest. In February 2023, after Financial Secretary Paul Chan increased football betting taxes, Chan said "They can have their reactions, and we will do what we have to do."

=== Club Identities ===
The club's logo combines together three equestrian elements – a horseshoe, a bit, and a whip. The current version designed by Austrian graphic designer Henry Steiner was adopted in 1996, one year ahead of the handover.

== Racing activities ==
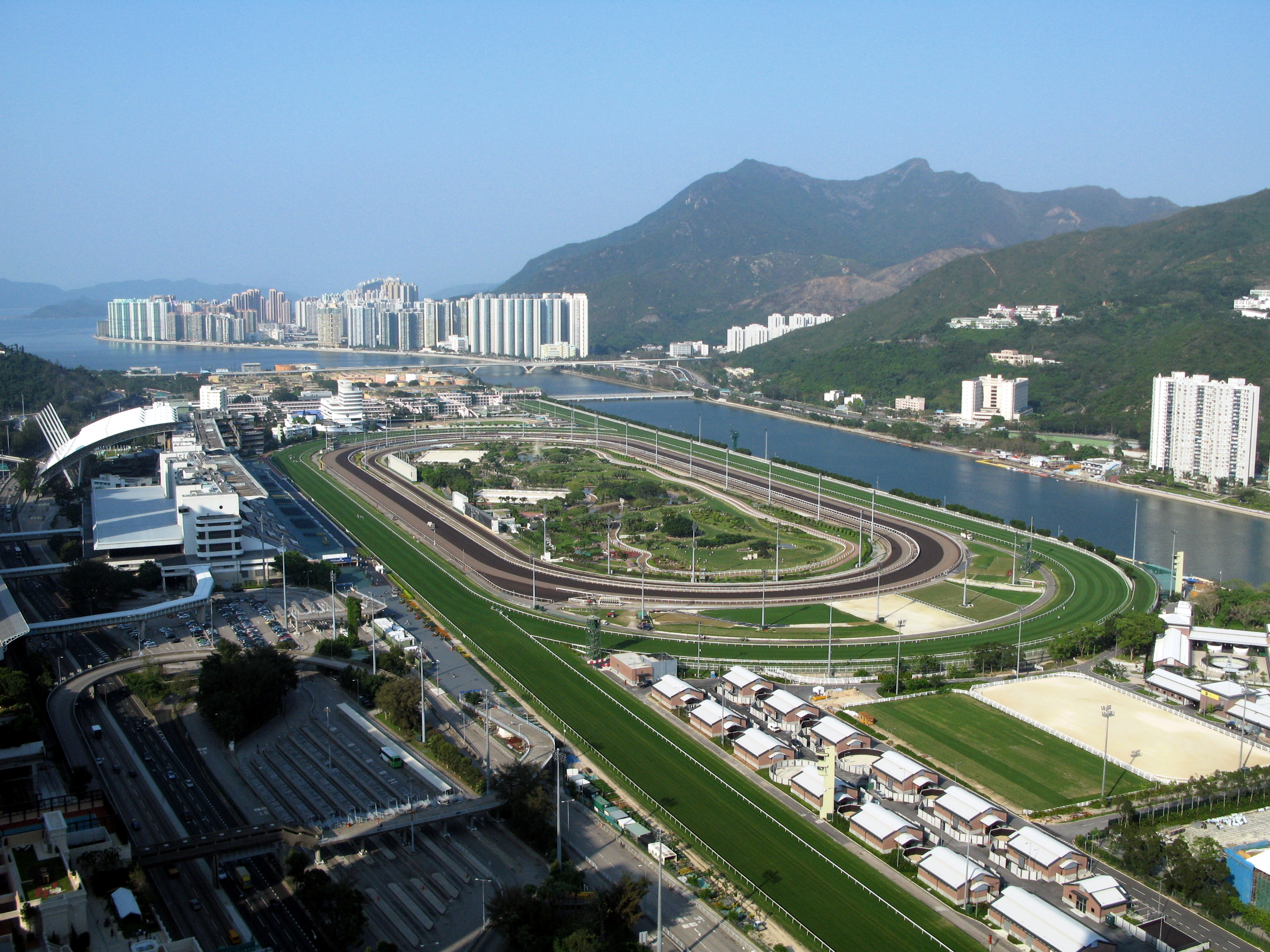
Sha Tin Racecourse

On 9 September 2007, Sha Tin Racecourse opened after its summer break with record 1-day crowd of about 60,000. Chief Secretary Henry Tang struck the ceremonial gong. The Hong Kong Jockey Club collected US$106 million in bets (highest since 2001). Children of horse owners were admitted amid protest of local anti-gambling groups. Sunny Power, ridden by Howard Cheng, got the trophy in the 1,200-metre dash.

In January 2008, Eclipse and Sovereign Award winning jockey Emma-Jayne Wilson became the first North American female rider to be granted a license to compete in Hong Kong.

Following the reform and other changes mentioned above, the HKJC revenue has steadily risen to previous levels and beyond. The total racing revenue for the Racing Season 2011/2012 reached HK$86.1 billion, up 43.4% since the 2006 reform.

== Betting and the law ==
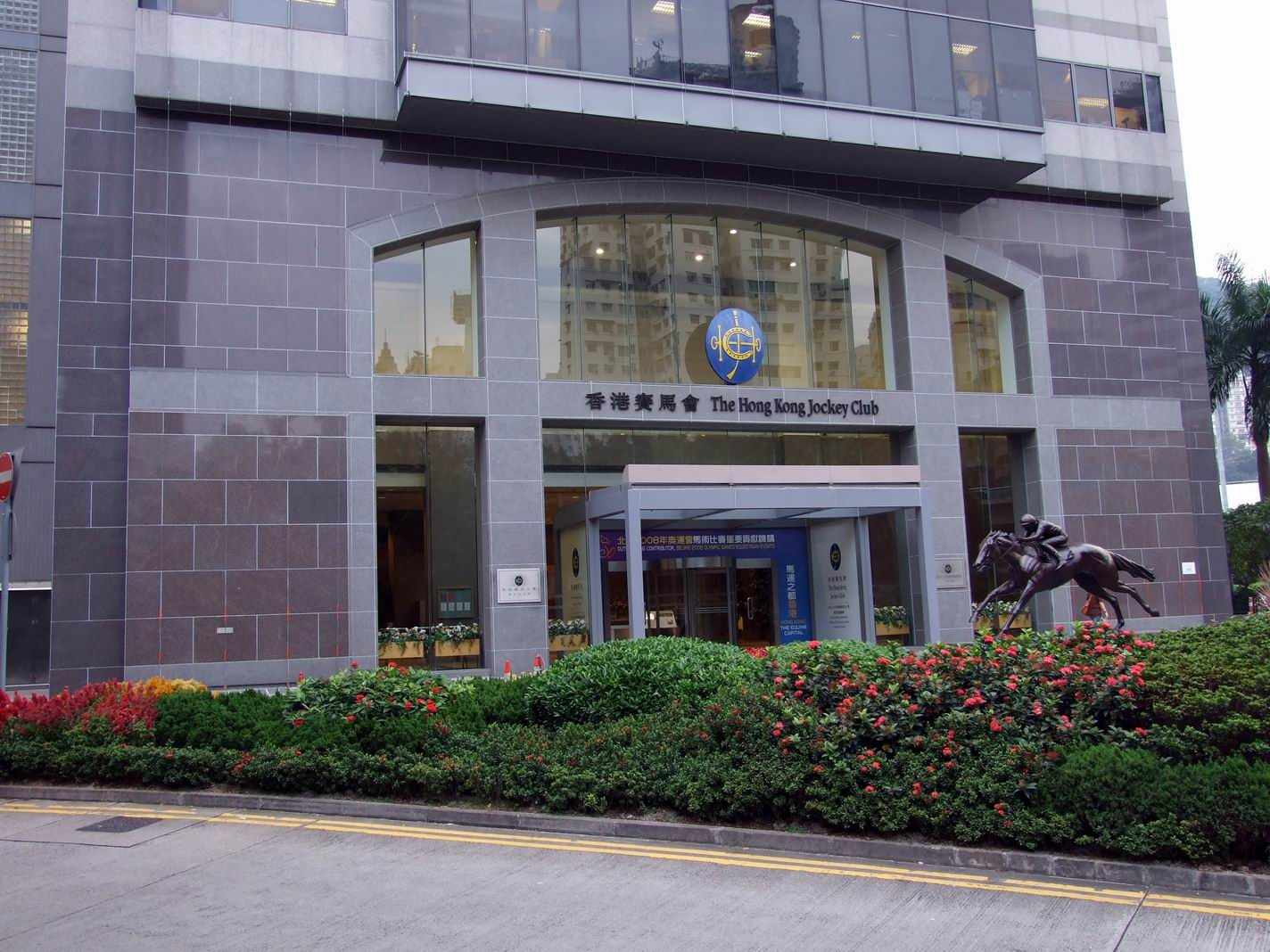
The head office in Happy Valley

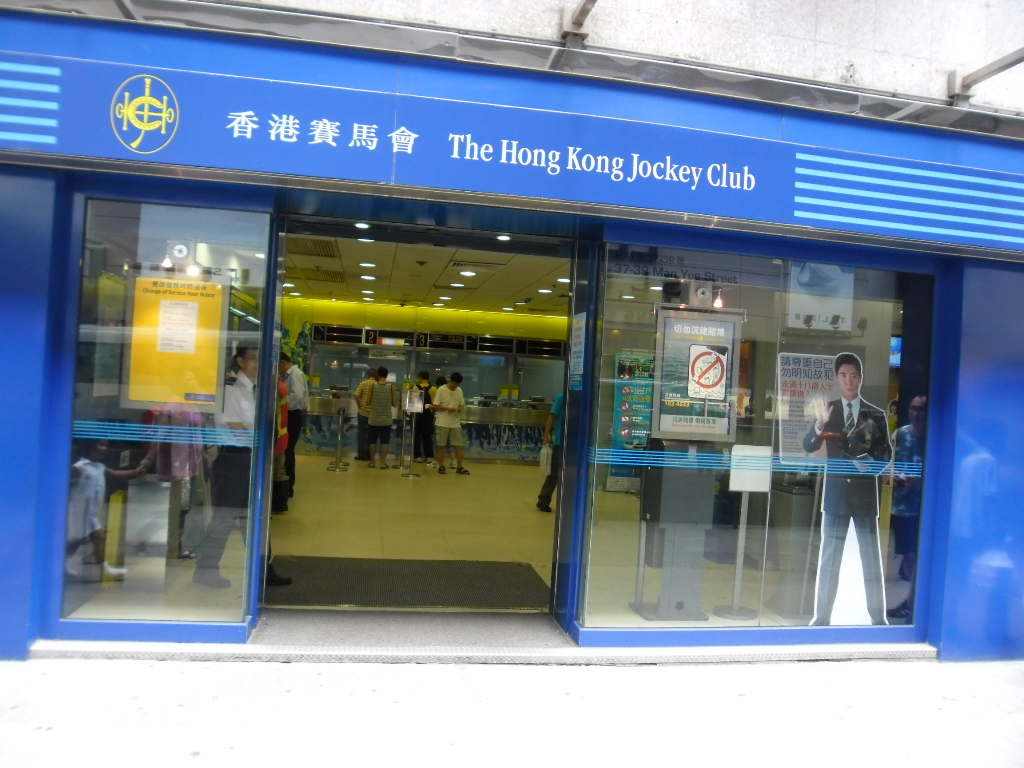
An off-course betting branch of the Hong Kong Jockey Club in Man Yue Street, Hung Hom.

The HKJC has a legal monopoly over betting on horse racing and football. In 1974, it opened 6 off-course branches where the members of the public could wager on horse race meets at the club's Happy Valley Racecourse. There are now in excess of 100 betting branches throughout the territory that accept bets on racing and football, as well as buy Mark Six lottery tickets.

== Social membership ==
Membership in this club is very strict, limited to the moneyed social elite. In the past, this club was reserved for only "old money" families; but currently there are increasing numbers of "newly rich" members.

As of 30 June 2022, the joining fee for racing membership is HK$150,000 whereas that for full membership is HK$850,000. Monthly fee is HK$850 and HK$2,550 respectively.

In September 2021, the club terminated several memberships, including those of Martin Lee, Jimmy Lai, and Albert Ho.

== Charities ==
The Charities Trust's donations to the community are made possible by The Hong Kong Jockey Club's integrated business model, which comprises racing and racecourse entertainment, sports wagering and lottery, a membership club, and charities and community contribution. Approximately 90% of the Club's annual operating surplus after tax is donated to its Charities Trust, enabling it to play a role in the community's development.

== Lease ==
The Happy Valley Racecourse occupies a 92,000 m^{2} plot of land on Inland Lot 8847, under a government-subsidized Private Recreational Lease. The lease began in 1884 and currently is set to expire on 23 June 2034.

Hong Kong Free Press in September 2021 claimed that the Jockey Club has broken its earlier promise to return the land at the Happy Valley Racecourse in exchange for land in Shatin.

In August 2024, news reported that the Jockey Club would convert some land it leased cheaply from the government (HK$84,600 per year) to build and sell private residences with high potential profit, with one researcher saying that such a plan was unfair and that "The government has leased the land to them at a very favourable price. It is not reasonable for them to profit fully from it."

== Club chairmen ==
#	Name	Tenure
1	Phineas Ryrie, JP	1884–92
2	Sir Catchick Paul Chater, CMG, JP	1892–1926
3	Henry Percy White	1926–29
4	Charles Gordon Stewart Mackie, JP	1929–35
5	Marcus Theodore Johnson, JP	1935–39
6	Thomas Ernest Pearce, JP	1940–41
7	Percy Tester	1945–46
8	Sir Arthur Morse, KBE, JP	1946–52
9	Donovan Benson, OBE, JP	1953–67
10	Sir John Anthony Holt Saunders, CBE, DSO, MC	1967–72
11	Sir Douglas Clague, CBE, MC, QPM, CPM, TD	1972–74
12	Peter Gordon Williams, OBE, JP	1974–81
13	Lord Sandberg, CBE	1981–86
14	Sir Oswald Victor Cheung, CBE, QC, SC, JP	1986–89
15	Sir Gordon MacWhinnie, JP	1989–91
16	Sir William Purves, CBE, DSO, GBM	1992–93
17	Sir John Joseph Swaine, CBE, QC, SC, JP	1993–96
18	Wong Chung-hin, CBE, JP	1996–98
19	Alan Li Fook-sum	1998–2002
20	Ronald Joseph Arculli, GBM, GBS, CVO, OBE, JP	2002–06
21	John Chan Cho-chak, GBS, CBE, LVO, JP	2006–10
22	Thomas Brian Stevenson, GBS, JP	2010–14
23	Simon Ip Sik-on, GBS, CBE, JP	2014–18
24	Anthony Chow Wing-kin, SBS, JP	2018–20
25	Philip Chen Nan-lok, GBS, JP	2020–22
26	Michael Lee Tsz-hau, JP	2022–25
27	The Hon Martin Liao Cheung-kong, GBM, GBS, JP	2025–present

== Chief Executive Officer ==
The role of Chief Executive Officer was first known as the General Manager. Major-General Bernard Penfold was appointed as the club's first General Manager in 1972.

1. Major-General Robert Bernard Penfold, CB, LVO (1972–1979)
2. General Sir Arthur John Archer KCB, OBE (1979–1986)
3. Major-General Guy Hansard Watkins, CB, OBE (1986–1996)
4. Lawrence Wong Chee-kong (1996–2007)
5. Winfried Engelbrecht-Bresges, GBS, JP (2007–present)

== See also ==
- Jockey Club Kitchee Centre
- Macau Jockey Club
- Gambling in Hong Kong
- Hong Kong Jockey Club College
- Jockey Club Museum of Climate Change
