= Paul Chater =

British businessman (1846 – 1926)

Sir Catchick Paul Chater KBE CMG
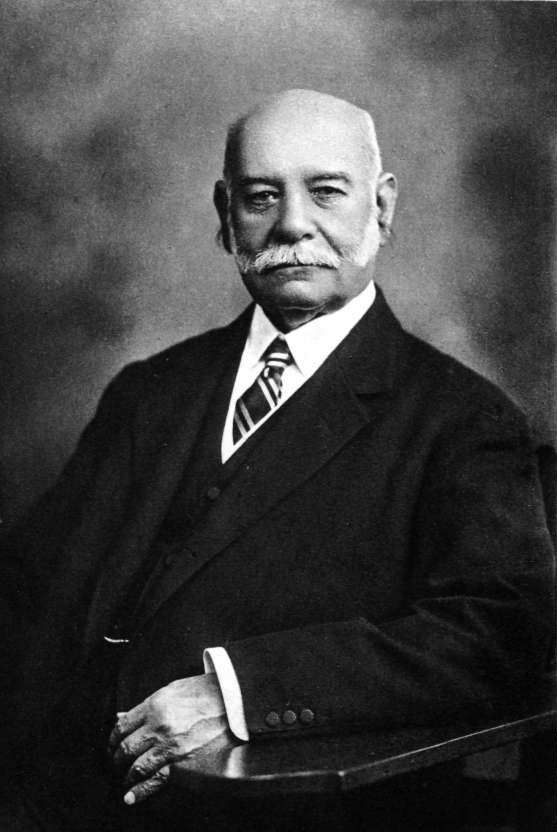
- Sir Paul Chater in 1924

Senior Unofficial Member of the Executive Council
- In office 8 September 1896 – 27 May 1926
- Appointed by: William Robinson
- Governor: William Robinson; Henry Arthur Blake; Matthew Nathan; Frederick Lugard; Francis Henry May; Reginald Edward Stubbs; Cecil Clementi
- Succeeded by: Sir Henry Pollock

Senior Unofficial Member of the Legislative Council
- In office 1 May 1900 – 16 January 1906
- Appointed by: Henry Arthur Blake
- Governor: Henry Arthur Blake; Matthew Nathan
- Preceded by: Emanuel Raphael Belilios
- Succeeded by: Sir Kai Ho

Personal details
- Born: Khachik Pogose Astwachatoorean; 8 September 1846 Calcutta, India
- Died: 27 May 1926 (aged 79) British Hong Kong
- Spouse: Maria Christine Pearson
- Occupation: Businessman
- Awards: Order of British Empire, Order of St Michael and St George

Paul Chater
- Traditional Chinese: 遮打
Transcriptions
Yue: Cantonese
- Yale Romanization: Jē dá
- Jyutping: Ze^{1} daa^{2}

Sir Catchick Paul Chater (Armenian: Խաչիկ Փոլ Չաթեր; Chinese: 遮打; 8 September 1846 – 27 May 1926) was a prominent British businessman of Armenian descent in colonial Hong Kong, whose family roots were in Calcutta, India.

== Biography ==
=== Early life ===
Chater was born Khachik Pogose Astwachatoorean (Armenian: Խաչիկ Պօղոս Աստուածատուրեան) in Calcutta, British India, one of thirteen offspring of Armenian parents, Miriam and Chater Paul Chater. His father was a member of the Indian Civil Service.

Chater was orphaned at the age of seven, and he gained entry into the La Martiniere College in Calcutta on a scholarship. In 1864, he moved to Hong Kong from Calcutta and lived with the family of his sister Anna and her husband, the Armenian-born Jordan Paul Jordan (1820–1875).

=== Career ===
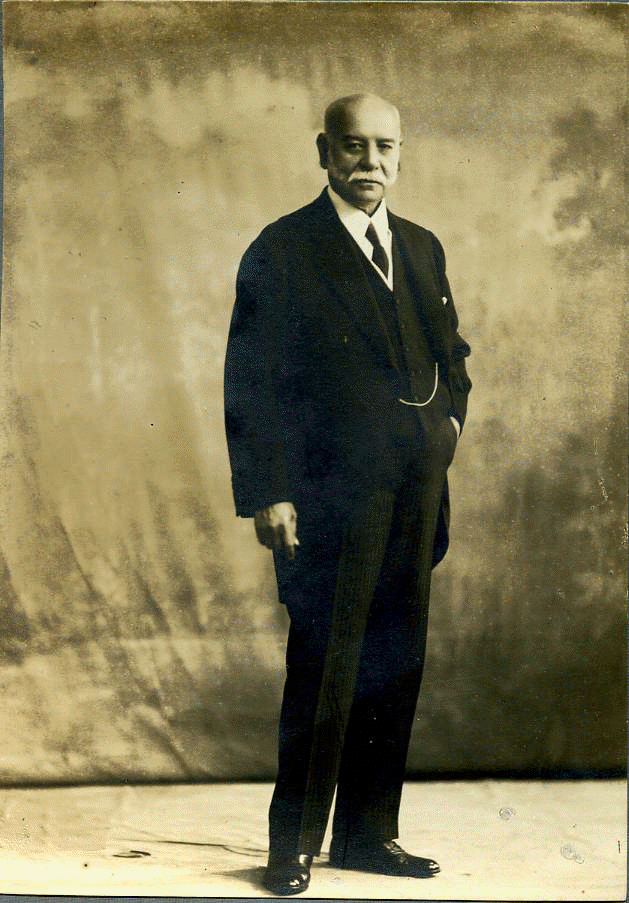
Full-length portrait of Chater, c. 1903

In the early days in Hong Kong, he was an assistant at the Bank of Hindustan, China and Japan. Later, with the aid of the Sassoon family, he set up business as an exchange broker, resigned from the bank, and traded gold bullion and land on his own account. He took sea-bed soundings at night in a sampan and was thus instrumental in plotting the reclamation of Victoria Harbour. He is credited with a pivotal role in the colonial government's success in acquiring lands then held by the military, at a cost of two million pounds sterling.

In 1868, he and Sir Hormusjee Naorojee Mody formed brokerage company Chater & Mody, a largely successful business partnership in Hong Kong, although the firm's Hong Kong Milling Company (aka Rennie's Mill) failed in 1908 and resulted in the suicide of Albert Rennie.

In 1886, he helped Patrick Manson establish Dairy Farm, and he entered the Legislative Council that same year, taking the place of F.D. Sassoon. Also in 1886 Chater established Kowloon Wharf and Godown, predecessor of The Wharf (Holdings).

In 1889, he established Hongkong Land with James Johnstone Keswick. Hong Kong Land commenced the land reclamation project under the Praya Reclamation Scheme in 1890. Persuaded by the suggestion of temporary councillor Bendyshe Layton that Hong Kong should have electricity, they secretly acquired an old graveyard in Wan Chai, where they built one of the earliest power stations in the world. In 1890, the Hongkong Electric Company went into production.

Chater was enthusiastic in two sports: He played for the Hong Kong Cricket Club 1st XI, and was a thoroughbred horse racing enthusiast. He reportedly never missed the weekly races at the Happy Valley Racecourse in 60 years. He set up the Chater Stable in Hong Kong in 1872 that won many races at Happy Valley. The Hong Kong Champions & Chater Cup, the Group One third leg of the Hong Kong Triple Crown, is named in his honour.

In 1896, Chater joined government ranks when he was appointed to the Executive Council, and served there until 1926, the year of his death. He was knighted in the 1902 Coronation Honours, receiving the accolade in person from King Edward VII at Buckingham Palace on 24 October that year.

In 1901, Chater constructed a very fine home with imported European marble at 1, Conduit Road, Hong Kong which he named 'Marble Hall'. Therein, he housed his collection of fine porcelain. To commemorate the coronation of King Edward VII in 1902, Chater presented a statue in bronze of the King to Hong Kong, executed by George Edward Wade and unveiled at Statue Square in 1907. In 1904, Chater single-handedly financed the construction of St. Andrew's Church.

Some titles and positions held by Chater:

- Master of the Perseverance Lodge, 1873
- Steward at the Royal Hong Kong Jockey Club
- Chairman of the Board of Stewards of the Royal Hong Kong Jockey Club, 1892–1926
- Senior Justice of the Peace in Hong Kong
- District Grand Master of Hong Kong and South China, 1881–1909
- Director of Dairy Farm Co. Ltd., 1886
- Consul for Siam in Hong Kong
- Treasurer and Chairman of the Queen Victoria Jubilee Committee, 1887
- Member of the Légion d'honneur by the French Government at Tonkin, 1892
- Member of the Public Lighting Committee, 1896
- Member of the Governor's Executive Council, 1896
- Chairman of the Queen Victoria Diamond Jubilee Committee, 1897
- Companion of the Order of St Michael and St George, 1897
- Honorary degree of LL.D. by the University of Hong Kong for services as the Honorary Treasurer, 1923

== Philanthropy ==
In May 1923, Chater, then treasurer of the University of Hong Kong, made a donation of $250,000 to the university at a time critical to its survival.

In 1924/25, Chater made the single biggest donation to any institution or organisation whilst still alive, donating 1.1 million Rupees to his alma mater, the desperately struggling La Martiniere College, thus allowing it to avoid certain closure. To honour his contribution to the school, Sir Paul Chater's name was included in the school prayer.

== Legacy ==
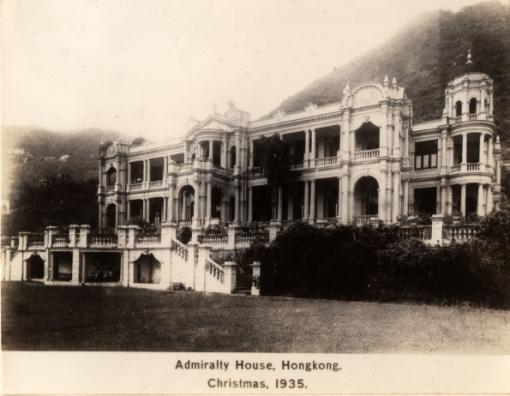
Marble Hall, subject of a 1935 Christmas postcard

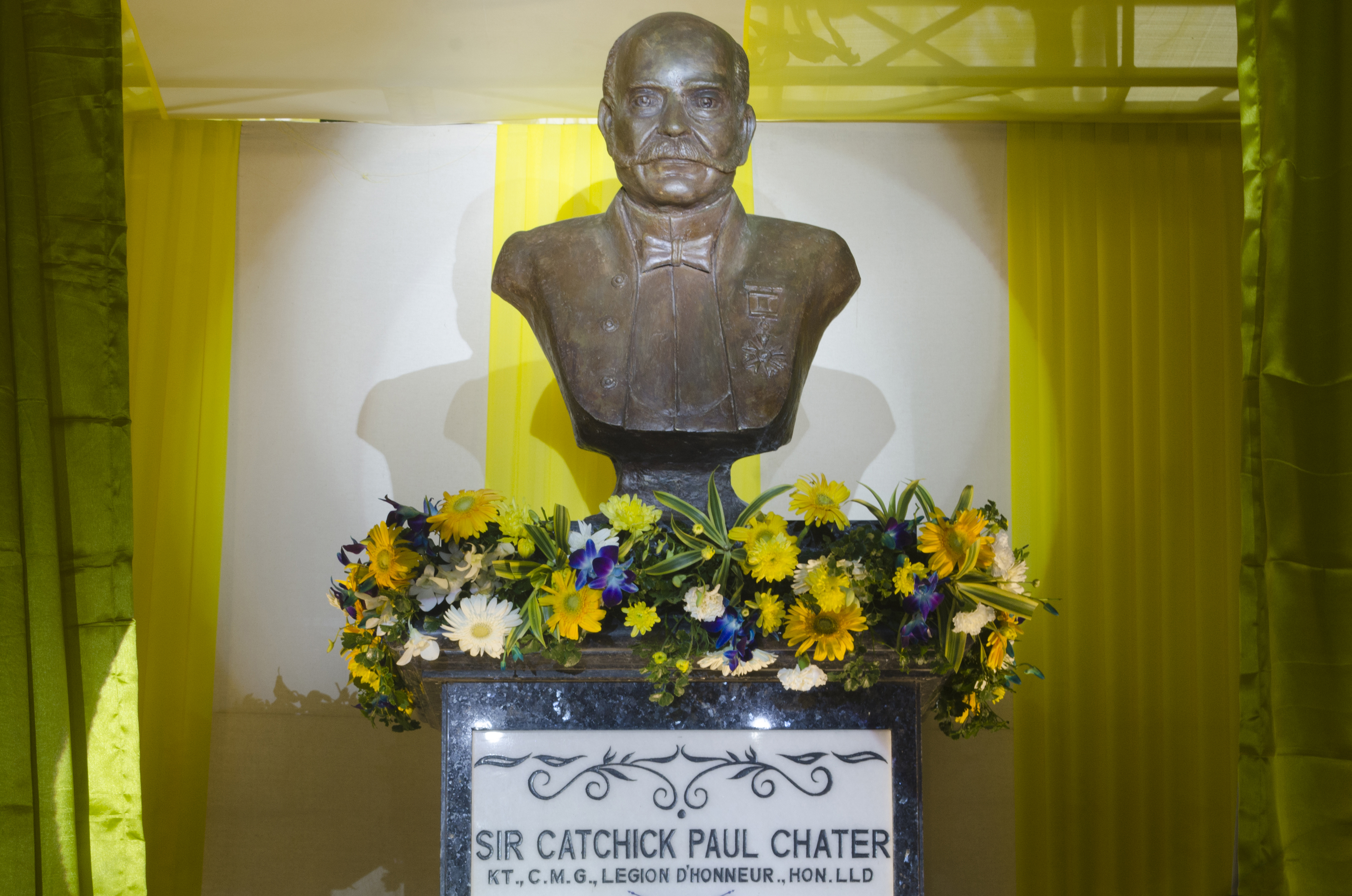
Bust of Catchick Paul Chater at La Martiniere Boys School, Kolkata

Chater died in 1926, and bequeathed Marble Hall and its entire contents, including his unique collection of porcelain and paintings, to Hong Kong. The remainder of his estate went to the Armenian Church of the Holy Nazareth in Calcutta, which runs a home for Armenian elderly, named The Sir Catchick Paul Chater Home. He was interred at the Hong Kong Cemetery.

He was due to be appointed a Knight Commander of the Order of the British Empire (KBE) in the 1926 Birthday Honours "in recognition of his public services in the Colony of Hong Kong, had he survived.".

Chater's wife lived in Marble Hall as a life tenant until her death in 1935. Ownership then passed to the government. It became "Admiralty House" – the official residence of the Naval Commander-in-Chief, and was commandeered by Japanese during their occupation. It accidentally burned down in 1946, and the government buildings occupied the site since its demolition in 1953. Government residences named 'Chater Hall Flats' are today located on the site of Marble Hall.

Chater amassed a large collection of historical pictures and engravings relating to China which he gifted to the colony. The Chater Collection was subject to a work by its curator, James Orange, in 1924, at which time the collection stood at 430 items. Its backbone was the collection of Wyndham Law of the Chinese Maritime Customs Service, and included oil paintings, watercolours, sketches, prints and photographs, most of which are based on landscape scenes of the South China trading ports in the 18th and 19th centuries, and of British activities in China. The Chater Collection was dispersed and largely destroyed during the Japanese occupation, and only 94 pieces (now an important part of the collection of the Hong Kong Museum of Art) are known to have survived.

Chater's nephew (Anna's son) Gregory Paul Jordan was instrumental in developing medical services and education in Hong Kong and in the founding of the University of Hong Kong. He was its second vice-chancellor.

On the occasion of the 171st anniversary of Paul Chater's birth, a bust of Paul Chater was unveiled at the La Martiniere Boys School, Kolkata.

- Chater Cup
- Chater Garden
- Chater House
- Chater Road
- Catchick Street
- Peking Road was named Chater Street until 1909, when it was renamed to avoid confusion with Chater Road.
- Chater Memorial Scholarship
- Chater Hall

== See also ==
- Robert Hotung
- List of Executive Council of Hong Kong unofficial members 1896–1941

Legislative Council of Hong Kong
Preceded by Frederick David Sassoon	Unofficial Member; Representative for Justices of the Peace; 1886	Succeeded by Frederick David Sassoon
Preceded by Frederick David Sassoon	Unofficial Member; Representative for Justices of the Peace; 1888–1906	Succeeded by Henry Edward Pollock
Preceded by Emanuel Raphael Belilios	Senior Unofficial Member; 1900–1906	Succeeded by Kai Ho
Sporting positions
Preceded by Phineas Ryrie	Chairman of the Hong Kong Jockey Club; 1892–1926	Succeeded by H. P. White
Political offices
New office	Unofficial Member of the Executive Council of Hong Kong; 1896–1926	Succeeded by Chow Shou-son
New office	Senior Unofficial Member of the Executive Council; 1896–1926	Succeeded by Sir Henry Pollock
