= Macau Jockey Club =

Horse racing and betting company in Macau, China

- Founded: 1980 as Macau Trotting Club
- Defunct: April 1, 2024
- Headquarters: Macau
- Key people: Dr. Stanley Ho, Chairman; Angela Leong On Kei, Vice Chairman and Executive Director
- Products: Betting, sports
- Number of employees: 2,500
- Website: www.mjc.mo

The Macau Jockey Club (MJC; traditional Chinese: 澳門賽馬會; simplified Chinese: 澳门赛马会; pinyin: Àomén Sàimǎhuì; Jyutping: ou3 mun4*2 coi3 maa5 wui6*2, Portuguese: Jockey Clube de Macau) was an organization providing horse racing and betting entertainment in Macau, China. At its peak, the club was one of the largest private employers in Macau with around 1,400 employees and around 1,100 part-timers.

The Macau Jockey Club ceased operation on April 1, 2024, with the final meeting held at Taipa Racecourse two days earlier on March 30, 2024.

== History ==
=== As the Macau Trotting Club ===
The club was established as the Macau Trotting Club with a racetrack built by casino businessman Tony Yip. The venue introduced harness racing in Asia. The other Yip brothers: Yip Hon, James Yip, and Bing Yip are also involved in the operations of the club.

Races were held at the Taipa racetrack. However the form of horseracing never gained traction as the Macau Trotting Club ceased operations in 1988.

=== As the Macau Jockey Club ===
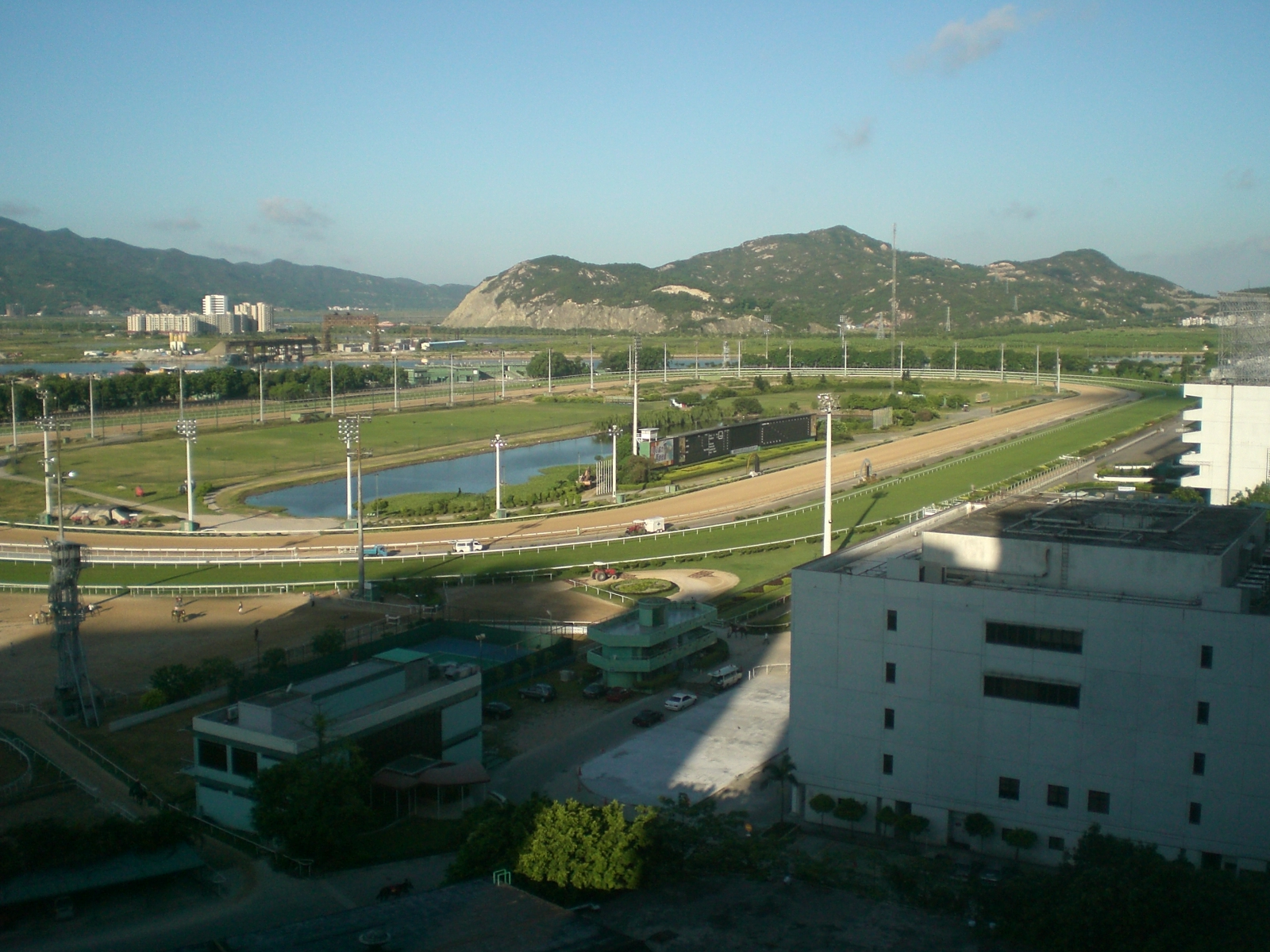
Taipa Racecourse in 2007

In 1989, the club was rebranded as the Macau Jockey Club after the Macau Horse Racing Company, a Taiwanese company took over. They shifted the business' operations to conventional horse racing. However, they closed after just a year due to poor profit.

Sometime in 1990, casino businessman Stanley Ho acquired ownership of the MJC for around 400 million patacas. Racing resumed in 1991. The MJC saw the participation of jockeys such as Lester Piggott and Frankie Dettori, who competed in the Macau Derby in 2002. The MJC peaked during the during the 2003 to 2004 season, running 1,200 races and maintaining 1,200 horses.

The Macau Jockey Club ceased operation on April 1, 2024. Plummeting wagering turnover and a substantial reduction in the horse population meant that the Club was no longer economically viable. The Macau Jockey Club halted its operations six months before its close partner, the Singapore Turf Club, was also due to close its doors.

As of 2025, the racecourse remains abandoned.

== Taipa Racecourse ==
Taipa Racecourse
- Owned by: Macau Jockey Club
- Date opened: 1980
- Date closed: 2024
- Capacity: 15,000 (grandstand), 3,000 (racing Complex)
- Course type: Thoroughbred

The Macau Jockey Club had one track on Taipa converted from the old trotting track. The old track is now the 1,400 metres (4,600 ft) inner sand track and the 1,600 metres (5,200 ft) newer outer track is turf. The track has a grandstand seating area for 15000 spectators and Race Complex for 3000.

The main stables at the MJC can house 1183 horses, 60 at a quarantine stable and 28 at spelling stables. The track has an equine hospital to handle minor care to surgery.

== See also ==
- Gambling in Macau
- Hong Kong Jockey Club
