= John Johnstone Paterson =

Unofficial Member of the Executive Council of Hong Kong
- In office 6 April 1936 – 25 December 1941
- Appointed by: Sir Andrew Caldecott
- Preceded by: William Shenton

Unofficial Member of the Legislative Council of Hong Kong
- In office 17 April 1930 – 25 December 1941
- Appointed by: Thomas Southorn; Sir William Peel; Sir Geoffry Northcote
- Preceded by: B. D. F. Beith

Chairman of the Hongkong & Shanghai Banking Corporation
- In office February 1932 – February 1933
- Preceded by: C. Gordon Mackie
- Succeeded by: Thomas Ernest Pearce
- In office February 1936 – February 1937
- Preceded by: Stanley Hudson Dodwell
- Succeeded by: C. Miskin
- In office February 1941 – February 1942
- Preceded by: H. V. Wilkinson
- Succeeded by: Arthur Morse

Personal details
- Born: 29 October 1886 Dumfries, Scotland
- Died: 29 January 1971 (aged 84) Nanyuki, Kenya
- Occupation: Businessman

John Johnstone Paterson (29 October 1886 - 29 January 1971) was a tai-pan of Jardine Matheson & Co. and a member of the Executive Council and Legislative Council of Hong Kong.

== Biography ==
The eldest son of William Paterson, a former partner at Jardine Matheson & Co. in the 1870s and 1880s, J. J. Paterson followed in his father's footsteps, becoming managing director of the firm in the 1930s. He also served as chairman of the Hongkong and Shanghai Banking Corporation on three occasions between 1932 and 1941.

Paterson was first appointed to the Legislative Council in April 1930 as a stand-in for B. D. F. Beith. Subsequently, he was re-appointed to two four-year-terms in 1934 and 1938. In April 1936, Paterson succeeded William Edward Leonard Shenton as a member of the Executive Council.

During his time in Hong Kong, Paterson served on a number of public bodies, including the Hong Kong Volunteer Defence Corps Advisory Committee, the Hong Kong Naval Volunteer Advisory Committee, the Authorized Architects' Committee, the Housing Commission and the Taxation Committee.

During the Battle of Hong Kong, he commandeered the Hong Kong Volunteer Defence Corps' Special Guard Company known as the Hugheseliers, after its founder A.W. Hughes. Many of the recruits were older British men who had fought in World War I and the Boer War. The company was tasked with defending the North Point Power Station and was one of the few to survive the Japanese attack. Paterson became a prisoner of war during the Japanese occupation of Hong Kong and was detained at Shamshuipo Camp and Argyle Street Camp.

After the war, J.J. Paterson settled in Nairobi, Kenya, where he died in 1971.

Legislative Council of Hong Kong
Preceded by B. D. F. Beith	Unofficial Member; 1930–1941	Japanese occupation of Hong Kong
Business positions
Preceded by C. Gordon Mackie	Chairman of the Hongkong and Shanghai Banking Corporation; 1932–1933	Succeeded by Thomas Ernest Pearce
Preceded by S. H. Dodwell	Chairman of the Hongkong and Shanghai Banking Corporation; 1936–1937	Succeeded by C. Miskin
Preceded by H. V. Wilkinson	Chairman of the Hongkong and Shanghai Banking Corporation; 1941–1942	Succeeded by Arthur Morse
Political offices
Preceded by W. E. L. Shenton	Unofficial Member for the Executive Council of Hong Kong; 1936–1941	Japanese occupation of Hong Kong
