= Hong Kong General Chamber of Commerce =

Nonprofit business advocacy group in Hong Kong

- HKGCC logo, introduced in 2001
- Abbreviation: HKGCC
- Formation: 29 May 1861; 165 years ago
- Legal status: Not-for-profit organisation
- Purpose: Chambers of commerce in Hong Kong
- Location: 22/F United Centre, 95 Queensway, Hong Kong
- Region served: Hong Kong
- Chairman: Dr Jacob Kam
- Website: www.chamber.org.hk

Hong Kong General Chamber of Commerce
- Traditional Chinese: 香港總商會
- Simplified Chinese: 香港总商会
Transcriptions
Standard Mandarin
- Hanyu Pinyin: Xiānggǎng Zǒng Shānghuì
Yue: Cantonese
- Jyutping: hoeng1 gong2 zung2 soeng1 wui6*2

The Hong Kong General Chamber of Commerce (HKGCC; Chinese: 香港總商會) was founded on 29 May 1861, and is the oldest and one of the largest business organizations in Hong Kong, marking a historic milestone of 165 years of service in 2026. It has thousands of corporate members, who combined employ around one-third of Hong Kong's workforce. It is a self-funding, not-for-profit organization that promotes and represents the interests of the Hong Kong business community. A core function of its work is to formulate recommendations on improving the business environment, which its 20 industry-specific committees constantly analyze and make regular submissions to Government of Hong Kong officials and policy makers.

The Chamber's key services are advocacy, events, networking and business services. It also issues Certificates of Origin, ATA Carnet, and Certificate of Business Identity among other business documentation services via its six branches around Hong Kong.

== History ==
=== Foundation ===
The Hong Kong General Chamber of Commerce was founded on 29 May 1861, just 20 years after the foundation of the Colony of Hong Kong with Alexander Perceval of British owned trading conglomerate Jardine, Matheson & Co as its first chairman. The original membership consisted of 62 companies.

== Business documentation services ==
The Chamber provides certification services in five districts in Hong Kong, and is the biggest location network in Hong Kong. It began issuing Certificates of Origin in 1920, and is the sole authorised organisation for issuing ATA Carnet documents. It also provides Document Endorsement, Consulate Endorsement Facilitation and Paper to EDI Conversion issued are fully recognized by consulates, banks and customs houses throughout the world.

== CEPA ==
In HKGCC's report “China’s Entry into the WTO and its Impact on Hong Kong Business”, released on 18 January 2000, one of the key recommendations was to explore the possibility of setting up a regional trade agreement (RTA), also sometimes called a “free trade agreement”, as a concrete means to enhance further integration of trade and economic relations between Hong Kong and mainland China. After China's accession to the WTO in 2001, HKGCC once again presented the idea to Tung Chee-hwa, the then HKSAR Chief Executive. The idea struck a chord with Tung who then put forward the RTA concept to the Central Government. On 20 December 2001, Jiang Zemin, General Secretary of the Chinese Communist Party, told Tung that the Central Government formally agreed to the suggestion, and consultation would begin immediately.

In January 2002, discussions between the HKSAR and the Central governments formally began, and a regional trade agreement was hammered out and formally named “Mainland/Hong Kong Closer Economic Partnership Arrangement” or CEPA. HKGCC then submitted a paper entitled “Towards a Regional Trade Agreement between China and HKSAR” to Antony Leung on 21 January 2002, put forward seven principles to guide the discussions on the RTA, emphasizing that CEPA must be compliant with WTO principles.
