= Charles Wedderburn Dickson =

British-born politician (1863–1934)

Unofficial Member of the Executive Council of Hong Kong
- In office 28 May 1902 – 17 May 1906
- Appointed by: Henry Arthur Blake
- Preceded by: J. J. Bell-Irving
- Succeeded by: E. A. Hewett

Unofficial Member of the Legislative Council of Hong Kong
- In office 28 May 1902 – 17 May 1906
- Appointed by: Henry Arthur Blake
- Preceded by: J. J. Bell-Irving
- Succeeded by: W. J. Gresson

Personal details
- Born: 23 February 1863
- Died: 1934 (aged 70–71)
- Spouse(s): Frances Emmeline, née Parkes

Charles Wedderburn Dickson (23 February 1863 – 1934) was the director of Jardine Matheson & Co. and member of the Executive Council and Legislative Council of Hong Kong.

Dickson was born 23 February 1863 to W. Dickson and Christina Keswick. His grandfather was William Keswick, and his uncle was Henry Keswick. Tony and John Keswick were his cousins. He was educated in Scotland and arrived in Hong Kong in 1884 and lived in Shanghai from 1894 to 1897. He became the director of Jardine Matheson from 1900 to 1906. He was also the Deputy Chairman of Hongkong and Shanghai Banking Corporation and director of various local companies.

Dickson married to Frances Emmeline Parkes, young daughter of Sir Harry Smith Parkes, British minister at Tokyo and Peking. They had two daughters, Dorothy Parkes Dickson born in 1895 and Mabel Dickson born in 1900.

In 1908, he chose to come overland across America. On arrival he purchased Friars Carse in Dumfriesshire which remained the family home until Fanny sold it to the Post Office (presumably as a retirement home) and moved to the Station Hotel where she lived for the rest of her life.

== See also ==
- List of Executive Council of Hong Kong unofficial members 1896–1941

Legislative Council of Hong Kong
Preceded by James Jardine Bell-Irving	Unofficial Member; 1902–1906	Succeeded by William Jardine Gresson
Political offices
Preceded by James Jardine Bell-Irving	Unofficial Member of the Executive Council of Hong Kong; 1902–1906	Succeeded by Edbert Ansgar Hewett
