= Jing'an Park =

Park in Shanghai, China

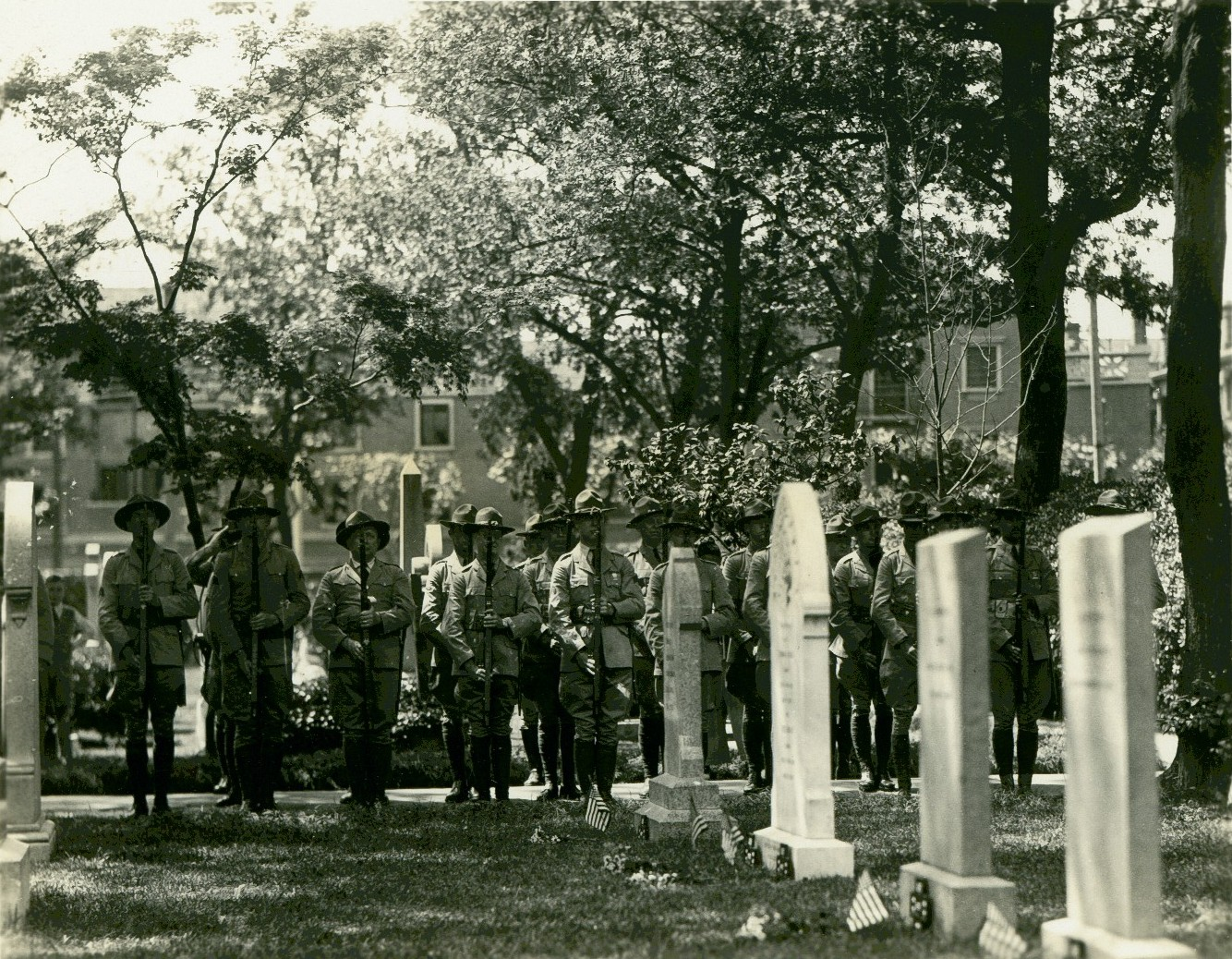
- The American Company of the Shanghai Volunteer Corps present arms during the Memorial Day exercises at the Bubbling Well Cemetery

- Location within Shanghai
- Type: Park
- Location: Nanjing Road
- Nearest city: Shanghai
- Coordinates: 31.2222°N 121.4468°E
- Created: 1954

Jing'an Park (Chinese: 静安公园; pinyin: Jīng'ān Gōngyuán) is a park located in the Western section of Nanjing Road, just opposite the Jing'an Temple in Shanghai, China. It occupies the site of the former Bubbling Well Road Cemetery.

== Location ==
The park is located at the crossing of Nanjing Road and Changshu Road, extending over the area south of Jing'an Temple Station.

== Bubbling Well Cemetery ==
What today constitutes the Western section of Nanjing Road was originally called Bubbling Well Road. Bubbling Well Cemetery was opened in 1898 and closed in 1951 with redevelopment into a park taking place in 1954. There were approximately 5,500 total burials and approximately 1,350 cremation conducted in the cemetery. In the winter of 1953-54 the cemetery was reclaimed for redevelopment. There were 43 British naval and 13 British military graves. In the process of removal of the military graves the Chinese authorities deliberately obliterated all details other than names The lane of plane trees down Jing'an Park's centre is a surviving feature of the former cemetery.

The following people of note were buried or cremated in the cemetery:

- Edward Bamford VC, DSO
- Nicholas John Hannen, Chief Justice of the British Supreme Court for China and Corea (cremation)
- Laura Askew Haygood, American Methodist missionary and educator
- Cecil Holliday, former chairman of the Shanghai Municipal Council
- John Prentice, former chairman of the Shanghai Municipal Council
- Hiram Parkes Wilkinson, Crown Advocate of the British Supreme Court for China
- Dr. William O'Hara, husband of actress May de Sousa
- William Wirt Lockwood, General Secretary of the Shanghai Young Men's Christian Association
