= William Jardine Gresson =

British merchant and politician (1869–1934)

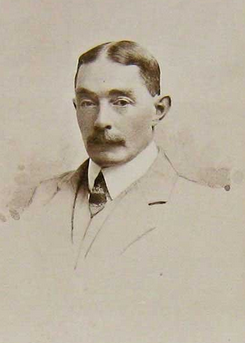
- Gresson in England, 1915
- Born: 1869
- Died: 10 January 1934 (aged 64–65)

William Jardine Gresson (1869 – 10 January 1934) was a British merchant and politician in Hong Kong and China.

He was the son of Mary Fleming Tinning, who was the daughter of Elizabeth "Betsy" Jardine, who was the daughter of David Jardine. David Jardine's brother Dr. William Jardine co-founded one of the largest trading houses in the Far East, Jardine Matheson & Co. Gresson arrived in Hong Kong in 1892 and became a managing partner in the Jardine Matheson & Co. from 1901 to 1910. He was also a Shanghai Municipal Councillor. He served as unofficial member of the Legislative Council of Hong Kong in 1904 and 1906 to 1910 and Executive Council of Hong Kong in 1904, 1905 and 1908. He retired from the Far East in 1911 and resided in the Birlingham House in a village in Worcestershire, England.

Gresson was killed in a hunting field in England on 10 January 1934. He left an estate to the gross value of £243,276, with net personalty £231,443.

Gresson Street in Wan Chai of Hong Kong Island was named after William Jardine Gresson.

Legislative Council of Hong Kong
Preceded by Charles Wedderburn Dickson	Unofficial Member; 1904	Succeeded by Charles Wedderburn Dickson
Preceded by Charles Wedderburn Dickson	Unofficial Member; 1906–1910	Succeeded by Henry Keswick
Business positions
Preceded by Henry Keswick	Chairman of the Hongkong and Shanghai Banking Corporation; 1909–1910	Succeeded by Hebert Edmund Tomkins
