= Cecil Holliday =

English businessman in China (1857–1924)

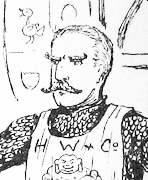
- Cartoon of Holliday as Shanghai Municipal Council chairman, from the Eastern Sketch, 1906

Chairman of the Shanghai Municipal Council
- In office January 1906 – August 1906
- Preceded by: Frederick Anderson
- Succeeded by: Henry Keswick

Personal details
- Born: 1857 Kersemoor, Manchester
- Died: July 31, 1924 (aged 67) Shanghai, China
- Profession: Businessman

Cecil Holliday was the chairman of the Shanghai Municipal Council in 1906. He also served as commandant of the Shanghai Volunteer Corps.

== Biography ==
Holliday was born in Kersemoor, Manchester, in 1857, the youngest son of John Holliday.

Holliday moved to Shanghai in the early 1877 to join Messrs Holliday, Wise & Co., a partnership that had been established by his father soon after China opened to trade in 1842. He was a member of the Shanghai Volunteer Corps and was promoted through its ranks eventually becoming commandant on two occasions.

He was elected to and became chairman of the Shanghai Municipal Council in January 1906. He resigned with effect from 24 August 1906 owing to difference with other members of the council over management of the city, in particular it seems the management of the Mixed Court Gaol. He was replaced as Chairman by Henry Keswick Holliday campaigned for greater transparency in council meetings proposing resolutions to allow the public access to their records and to allow the press to attend meetings.

He died on 31 July 1924 at St Marie's Hospital in the French Concession in Shanghai and was buried at the Bubbling Well Road Cemetery at a funeral attended by the British consul-general, Sidney Barton, and the British crown advocate for China, Hiram Parkes Wilkinson. The pall bearers were Sir Edward Pearce and Messrs A.W. Burkill, C.R. Burkill, Calder Marshall, C.H. Arnhold and C.W. Porter.

== Marriage ==
Holliday was married to Eliza. She died in April 1920. They had one son, John Cecil Hamilton Holliday, who served in the army. John married Eileen Mabel Howden in 1914.
