= John Keswick =

Scottish businessman

Sir John Keswick KCMG

Unofficial Member of the Executive Council of Hong Kong
- In office 20 June 1952 – 1956
- Appointed by: Sir Alexander Grantham
- Preceded by: C. E. M. Terry
- Succeeded by: P. S. Cassidy

Personal details
- Born: 1906 Dumfriesshire, United Kingdom
- Died: 1982 (aged 75–76) Dumfriesshire, United Kingdom
- Spouse: Clare Elwes (m. 1940–1982)
- Children: Margaret Keswick
- Parent(s): Henry Keswick; Ida Wynifred Keswick
- Relatives: William Keswick (grandfather); Gervase Elwes (father-in-law); Charles Jencks (son-in-law)
- Occupation: Merchant

Sir John Henry Keswick, KCMG (1906–1982) was an influential Scottish businessman in China and Hong Kong. He was the tai-pan of Jardine, Matheson & Co., the leading British trading firm in the Far East, and had established friendship with many Chinese politicians. He was also a representative of the Special Operations Executive, a British intelligence service during the Second World War.

== Early life and wartime career ==
Sir John Keswick was born in 1906 to the third generation of Keswick family in the Jardine, Matheson & Co. His father, Henry Keswick, son of William Keswick, was a Jardine tai-pan and a Conservative Member of Parliament. Sir John followed his father and grandfather into Jardine in 1929 at the age of 23. He worked in Shanghai from 1931 until the outbreak of the Second World War in Europe in 1939.

He then went to Chungking, the wartime capital of China and worked for the Minister of Economic Warfare in the wartime government, attached to the British Embassy as a Special Operations Executive (SOE) Oriental Mission's representative. He negotiated with Chiang Kai-shek for SOE to develop training facilities including the Special Training School on his territory in January 1942. But the relationship faltered soon after as the head of Chiang's intelligence service, General Tai Li and others insisted that the STS should be headed by a Chinese. As a result, Sir John and his White Russian deputy Vladimir Petropavlovsky were ordered to leave the country in 1943. He was transferred to Lord Mountbatten as a liaison officer with the Southeast Asia Command. During the time in Chungking, he established a friendship with Zhou Enlai, who later became Premier of the People's Republic of China. He married Clare Elwes in 1940.

== Post-war career ==
After the Communist takeover, Jardine's head office was moved to Hong Kong. Despite attempting to work with the Communists and personally negotiating the handover of Jardine assets to the communists, business conditions became worse. He and his wife were put under house arrest. Operations were closed in 1954 with the effective nationalisation of the company's interests and a $20 million loss.

He was the taipan of Jardine from 1952 to 1956 in Hong Kong and was appointed to the Executive Council. For his contributions, he was invested as a Companion of the Order of St Michael and St George (CMG) in 1950. He was also the president of the Sino-British Trade Council from 1961 to 1973 and was at one time president of the China Association and vice-president of the Great Britain-China Centre. In 1973, he was awarded the Knight Commander of the Order of St Michael and St George (KCMG) for his contributions to China trade. As a personal friend of Zhou Enlai, Sir John continued to make annual trips to China. In 1979 when Deng Xiaoping seized power after the Cultural Revolution, Sir John visited China with the Great Britain-China Centre delegation led by Malcolm MacDonald, former British High Commissioner in Southeast Asia and also a long-time friend of Zhou Enlai, and included Sir Harold Thompson and Elizabeth Wright. They had a 90-minute surprise interview with Deng and met with many Chinese officials.

== Personal life and family ==
Sir John spoke fluent Chinese. He developed a friendship with Zhou Enlai, Premier of the People's Republic of China, and Madame Soong Ching-ling, wife of Sun Yat-sen during his stay in China. He was a Chinese art collector, particularly contemporary paintings.

He married Clare Mary Alice Cynthia Catherine Celia Elwes (1905–1998), youngest daughter of tenor Gervase Elwes and Lady Winefride, daughter of the 8th Earl of Denbigh. They married in Westminster Cathedral in 1940. Their only child was Margaret Keswick (1941–1995). She was a writer, gardener and designer and married an American architect and writer, Charles Jencks in 1978.

Together with his daughter, Sir John founded the Hollywood Trust in 1981 to address problems that disadvantaged young people in Dumfries and Galloway faced, and in 1979 also the Keswick Foundation for mental health in Hong Kong. Margaret also founded Maggie's Centres for those suffering from cancer.

== See also ==
- History of Jardine, Matheson & Co.

Business positions
Preceded by D. F. Landale	Chairman of the Jardine, Matheson & Co. 1952–1956	Succeeded by Sir Hugh Barton
