= Myburgh =

Myburgh is a surname. Notable people with the surname include:

- Alexander Myburgh (1848–1889), South African barrister, chairman of the Shanghai Municipal Council 1883–1884
- Alwyn Myburgh (born 1980), South African hurdler
- Brian Myburgh (born 1973), South African former field hockey player who competed in the 1996 Summer Olympics
- Claude Myburgh (1911–1987), English cricketer and British Army officer
- Geoff Myburgh (1928–2010), South African Olympic sailor and one of the founders of the NSRI
- Jeanette Myburgh (born 1940), South African former swimmer who competed in the 1956 Summer Olympics
- Johann Myburgh (born 1980), former South African cricketer
- Natalie Myburgh (1940–2014), South African swimmer
- Pieter Myburgh (born 1986), South African rugby union footballer
- Pieter-Louis Myburgh, South African investigative journalist
- Stephan Myburgh (born 1984), Dutch cricketer of South African origin
- Tertius Myburgh (1936–1990), South African journalist and editor of the Sunday Times between 1975 and 1990
- Wessel Myburgh (born 1990), Namibian cricketer

== See also ==
- Maryburgh
