= Keswick family =

Business dynasty of Scottish origin

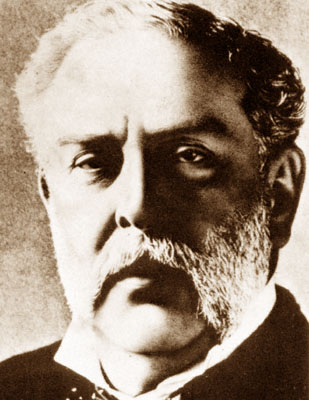
William Keswick, founder of the Keswick family

The Keswick family (/ˈkɛzɪk/) are a business dynasty of Scottish origin associated with the Far East region since 1855 and in particular the conglomerate Jardine Matheson.

As tai-pans of Jardine Matheson & Company, the Keswick family have at some time been closely associated with the ownership or management of the HSBC, the Indo-China Steam Navigation Company Ltd., the Canton Insurance Office Ltd, (now the HSBC Insurance Co), The Hongkong and Kowloon Wharf and Godown Company Limited, Star Ferry, Hong Kong Tramway, the Hong Kong Land Investment and Agency Co Ltd, and the Hongkong and Whampoa Dock Co Ltd.

== First generation ==
=== The Hon. William Keswick (1834–1912) ===
The founder of the dynasty, William Keswick was born in 1834, in Dumfriesshire in the Scottish Lowlands. His grandmother, Jean Jardine Johnstone was an older sister of Dr. William Jardine, the founder of Jardine Matheson & Company His father Thomas Keswick had married Margaret Johnstone, Jardine's niece and daughter of Jean, and entered the Jardine business. The company operated as opium traders and had a major influence in the First and Second Opium Wars although the company stopped this trading in 1870 to pursue a broad range of other trading interests including shipping, railways, textiles and property development.

William arrived in China and Hong Kong in 1855, the first of five generations of the Keswick family to be associated with Jardines. He established a Jardine Matheson office in Yokohama, Japan in 1859. He returned to Hong Kong to become a partner of the firm in 1862. He became managing partner (Taipan) from 1874 to 1886. He left Hong Kong in 1886 to work with Matheson & Co. in London as a senior director responsible only to Sir Robert Jardine (1825–1905), a son of David Jardine, William Jardine's older brother and the head of Mathesons in London.

He spent three spells on the Legislative and Executive Councils of Hong Kong between 1868 and 1887.

William represented Epsom, Surrey, as Member of Parliament from 1899 and was appointed the county's High Sheriff in 1898.

He died at his home, Eastwick Park, Great Bookham, Surrey, on 9 March 1912. William had lived in the house since 1882 and on his death, it passed to his son Henry.

=== The Hon. James Johnstone Keswick (1845–1914) ===
J.J. Keswick, younger brother of William, arrived in the Far East in 1870 and remained for 26 years, mostly based in Hong Kong. Nicknamed, "James the bloody polite", a tribute to his personality. Like his brother, he was a member of the legislative council and chairman of the Hong Kong General Chamber of Commerce in five spells between 1890 and 1900. He was Sir Harry Smith Parkes' son-in-law and taipan of Jardine, Matheson from the 1890s to the turn of the century. He founded Hongkong Land together with close associate Sir Paul Chater, a development company established in 1889 which remained closely associated with Jardine Matheson.

=== John Johnstone Jardine Keswick (1842–1904) ===
John Johnstone Jardine Keswick was based in Calcutta, where he headed Jardine Skinner & Co, with a fellow Scot as his business partner John (Skinner) Stewart. J.J.J. Keswick was also the chairman of the Rio Tinto Company (now Rio Tinto Group) in the early years of the 20th century. He lived at Dormont, Lockerbie, Dumfries.

== Second generation ==
=== Henry Keswick (1870–1928) ===
Son of William, Henry Keswick arrived in Hong Kong in 1895 the year before his uncle James left. He had previously spent two years in the New York office of Jardines.

The first gap in the long line of continuous association with Hong Kong occurred when he returned home to represent Hong Kong at the coronation of King George V in 1911. He did return to Hong Kong and the Far East in his yacht "Cutty Sark" in 1922. He remained a director of Jardines until his death in 1928.

Like his father, Henry served as M.P. for Epsom, Surrey, and on his death left UK estate valued at £466,409, worth approximately £46 million at 2014 values.

He married Ida Wynifred Johnston and had 3 children, David Johnston, Sir William Johnston "Tony" Keswick and Sir John Henry Keswick KCMG.

== Third generation ==
The next family members to be associated with Hong Kong and Shanghai were Henry's sons "Tony" and John Keswick. As well as being directors of Jardines they served as members of the Legislative and Executive Councils in Hong Kong and of the Shanghai Municipal Council responsible for Shanghai's International Settlement. They were also Chairmen of the Shanghai Municipal Council and Chamber of Commerce at various times. When William and his father Henry Keswick returned to the United Kingdom they both served as members of parliament with responsibility for Far Eastern interests.

=== Sir William Johnstone "Tony" Keswick (1903–1990) ===
"Tony" Keswick was born in Yokohama, Japan, but returned to England as a boy to attend Winchester College and Trinity College, Cambridge. He arrived in the Far East in 1926. Keswick and his brother remained directors of the firm after they had left the Far East. He was in charge of the Shanghai office (at that time the Head Office in the Far East) from 1935 until 1941. He was also chairman of the Shanghai Municipal Council during the crises leading to the Pacific War, and survived a murder attempt by the Japanese in Shanghai. During the Pacific War, he served as head of the China Theatre of the Special Operations Executive, Britain's wartime secret service.

=== Sir John "The Younger" Keswick (1906–1982) ===
John Keswick followed his brother to the far east in 1929 and replaced him in Shanghai after the shooting incident. Like his brother, John Keswick worked for the Special Operations Executive (SOE) alongside Nationalist leader Chiang Kai-shek's spy chief General Dai Li in Chongqing. He fled Shanghai when the Japanese took the city, escaping with his wife Clare to Ceylon (Sri Lanka) and served during the war with Admiral Lord Louis Mountbatten's staff.

John Keswick returned to Shanghai after the war to organise in the rebuilding of Jardine's office and to reestablish the firm's trading links throughout China and Asia. In 1949, after the communist party's takeover of China, Jardine's head office was moved to Hong Kong. Despite attempting to work with the communists, business conditions became worse. Operations were closed in 1954 with the effective nationalisation of the company's interests and a $20m loss.

John Keswick became a member of the Hong Kong Executive Council in 1952. He retired as Tai-pan in 1953 and joined Matheson & Co in 1956. He returned temporarily as non-executive chairman of Jardine Matheson in Hong Kong from 1970 to 1972. While in England, he and his brother financed the buy-out and then public flotation of Jardine Matheson.

He was married in 1940 to the Roman Catholic, Clare Elwes (1905–1998), youngest child of the tenor Gervase Elwes. Their only child was Margaret, known as Maggie Keswick, gardener and author (1941–1995), who founded Maggie's Centres for those suffering from cancer. She had two children with her husband, the landscape architect Charles Jencks, whom she had married in 1978, as his 2nd wife. (Charles Jencks remarried in 2006 Louisa Lane-Fox, former wife of historian Robin Lane Fox and mother of Martha Lane Fox, Baroness Lane-Fox of Soho).

== Fourth generation ==
=== Sir Henry Keswick ===
Tony Keswick's son, Henry, born 1938 as Henry Neville Lindley Keswick, joined Jardines in 1961 and was assigned to the firm's offices in Hong Kong, Singapore and Malaysia. He was made a director in 1967, senior managing director in 1970 and chairman in 1972. He retired as senior managing director and chairman in 1975. He returned to London and was chairman of Jardine Matheson Holdings until his death in November 2024.

=== Sir Chippendale Keswick ===
Sir Chips Keswick, Tony Keswick's second son who was born in 1940, was not associated with Jardine Matheson but instead with the London merchant bank, Hambros. He was the chairman of English football club Arsenal F.C.

=== Simon Keswick ===
Young Henry's youngest brother, Simon Keswick, born 1942, joined the firm in 1962 and became a director in 1972 but left Jardines in 1977 to join his brother at Matheson & Co. He returned to join Jardines again in 1983 as senior managing director and then chairman after his father managed to remove the former managing director David Newbigging. Keswick started the restructuring of the company becoming more international rather than tied to Hong Kong.

He retired as Tai-pan in 1988 after seeing the firm's holding office redomiciled to Bermuda and restructuring the firm's senior management organisation.

== Fifth generation ==
The family still owns considerable holdings in the company with a 5th generation working within the company.

=== Percy Weatherall ===
Percy Weatherall (born 1957) or Edward Percy Keswick Weatherall, is a great-grandson of Henry Keswick (1870–1928). He was managing director of the Jardine Matheson Group from 2000 to 31 March 2006 having joined the board in 1999.

Weatherall joined the Jardine Group in 1976 and worked in a number of senior executive positions in Hong Kong, the US, the United Kingdom, Saudi Arabia, Korea and the Philippines. Prior to becoming "Taipan", Weatherall was chief executive officer of Hongkong Land.

=== Ben Keswick ===
Ben Keswick, son of Simon, born 1972, joined the board in April 2007. He was group managing director of Jardine Cycle & Carriage. He joined the group in 1998 and held positions in Dairy Farm and Hongkong Land before taking an MBA at INSEAD. In 2003, he was appointed finance director of Jardine Pacific, and was its chief executive officer from 2005 to 2007. Ben Keswick became chairman and managing director (taipan) of Jardine Matheson Limited in April 2012. He also holds senior leadership positions in Cycle & Carriage Bintang and MCL Land; and a commissioner of Astra and United Tractors.

=== Adam Keswick ===
Adam Keswick, born 1973, son of Chips, joined the board in April 2007. He is chief executive of Jardine Pacific and of Jardine Motors. After joining the Group in 2001 from N M Rothschild & Sons, he held positions within Group Treasury and Jardine Pacific. Mr Keswick was appointed group strategy director of Jardine Cycle & Carriage in 2003, and was group managing director from 2005 to 2007. He is also a director of Jardine Matheson Limited.

== Family tree ==
This is the family tree of William Jardine (1784–1843), co-founder of the Far Eastern conglomerate, Jardine Matheson Holdings.

== See also ==
- Anglo-Chinese relations
- Jardine Matheson Holdings

== Sources ==
- William Keswick, 1835–1912: Jardine's Pioneer in Japan by J. E. Hoare, Chapter 10, Britain & Japan: Biographical Portraits ISBN 1-903350-14-X
- The Thistle and the Jade: A Celebration of 175 Years of Jardine, Matheson & Co. by Maggie Keswick
- Jardine Matheson Archives from Cambridge University
