= Henry Keswick =

Henry Keswick may refer to:

- Henry Keswick (politician) (1870–1928), British taipan of Jardine Matheson & Co and Member of Parliament
- Sir Henry Keswick (businessman) (1938–2024), British chairman of Jardine Matheson & Co, grandson of the above
