= Epsom (constituency) =

Parliamentary constituency in the United Kingdom, 1885–1974

Coordinates: 51.33°N 0.27°W

- Former borough constituency for the House of Commons
- Location of Surrey within England
- County: Surrey
- Major settlements: Epsom, Ewell and Ashtead, others to east before 1945, to west before 1950

1885–1974
- Seats: One
- Created from: parts of West Surrey and Mid Surrey
- Replaced by: Epsom and Ewell and Mole Valley (as to the former Leatherhead Urban District)
- During its existence contributed to new seat(s) of: Sutton and Cheam; Esher; Surbiton

Epsom was a borough constituency represented in the House of Commons of the Parliament of the United Kingdom. It elected one Member of Parliament (MP) by the first past the post system of election. From its creation in 1885 until its abolition in 1974, it was won by eight Conservatives. The winner took less than 50% of the votes in its contested elections once, in 1945, receiving 49.9% of the vote in a three-party contest. Six elections, the last being a by-election in 1912, were uncontested.

== History ==
=== Geographical history ===
Creation and abolition

The seat was established under the Redistribution of Seats Act 1885 as the Mid or Epsom division of Surrey for the 1885 general election. The Mid designation was lesser used, since it could be misleading, as its extent until 1885 was a long strip to the east bounded by among other parishes: Lambeth, Streatham, Croydon, Burstow, Capel and Sutton.

Scope

The Redistribution of Seats Act 1885 set up the seat so as to comprise:

- Epsom sessional division
- all parts of Kingston (and Elmbridge) sessional division not within Kingston parish, nor municipal borough; which meant outlying parishes to the south-west, south and south-east
- Effingham (parish)
- Mickleham (parish)

Thus the seat drew on Mid Surrey as to Tolworth, New Malden, Malden, Worcester Park, Surbiton, Hook, Coombe and Long Ditton in the Kingston Hundred and Sessional Division. It drew on West Surrey as to: Ashtead; Banstead; Great Bookham; Little Bookham; Cheam; Chessington; Cuddington; Epsom; Ewell; Fetcham; Headley; Leatherhead; Sutton; Walton on the Hill; Cobham; Thames Ditton; Esher; East Molesey; West Molesey; Stoke D'Abernon; and Walton on Thames.

The Representation of the People Act 1918 cut the area down to its south-eastern third namely:

- the borough of Epsom and Ewell
- Leatherhead Urban District
- Sutton Urban District

The Representation of the People Act 1948 confirmed a 1945-implemented split-up of all seats of more than 100,000 electors, of Sutton and Cheam Urban District to create Sutton and Cheam (UK Parliament constituency) to the north-east. Removal of a broad western area to form Esher ensued in 1950. As such it remained in the 1970 review-implementing Order. The 1983 reforms saw more than its renaming and technical abolition, the seat shed in the south the former Leatherhead Urban District to Mole Valley created that year.

The seat was abolished for the February 1974 general election, replaced by Epsom and Ewell except for its south which contributed to the new seat of Mole Valley.

== Boundaries ==
1885–1918: The Sessional Divisions of Epsom and Kingston (comprising most of Elmbridge) as excluding "the part of the civil parish of Kingston [and] the Municipal Borough of Kingston-on-Thames", and the (mainly rural) civil parishes of Effingham and Mickleham to the south-west and south respectively.

1918–1945: The Urban Districts of Epsom, Leatherhead, and Sutton, and the Rural District of Epsom.

1945–1974: The Municipal Borough of Epsom and Ewell, and the Urban District of Leatherhead.

== Members of Parliament ==
Election	Member	Party
1885	Constituency created.	
1885	George Cubitt	Conservative
1892	Thomas Bucknill	Conservative
1899 by-election	William Keswick	Conservative
1912 by-election	Henry Keswick	Conservative
1918	George Blades	Conservative
1928 by-election	Sir Archibald Southby	Conservative
1947 by-election	Malcolm McCorquodale	Conservative
1955	Peter Rawlinson	Conservative
Feb 1974	Constituency abolished. See Epsom and Ewell.	

== Elections ==
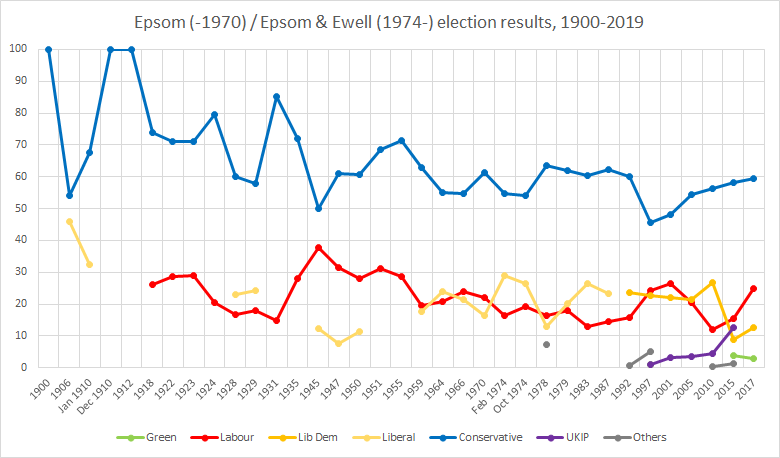
Epsom election history

=== Elections in the 1880s ===
General election 1885: Epsom
Party	Candidate	Votes	%	±%
Conservative	George Cubitt	4,621	66.1	
Liberal	Richard Harris	2,368	33.9	
Majority		2,253	32.2	
Turnout		6,989	77.6	
Registered electors		9,009		
Conservative win (new seat)				

General election 1886: Epsom
Party	Candidate	Votes	%	±%
Conservative	George Cubitt	Unopposed		
Conservative hold				

=== Elections in the 1890s ===
General election 1892: Epsom
Party	Candidate	Votes	%	±%
Conservative	Thomas Bucknill	5,123	65.3	N/A
Liberal	Thomas Brassey	2,720	34.7	New
Majority		2,403	30.6	N/A
Turnout		7,843	75.7	N/A
Registered electors		10,354		
Conservative hold		Swing	N/A	

General election 1895: Epsom
Party	Candidate	Votes	%	±%
Conservative	Thomas Bucknill	Unopposed		
Conservative hold				

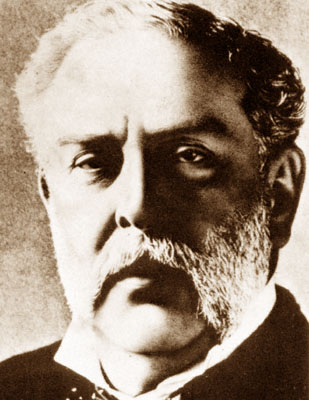
William Keswick

1899 Epsom by-election
Party	Candidate	Votes	%	±%
Conservative	William Keswick	Unopposed		
Conservative hold				

=== Elections in the 1900s ===
General election 1900: Epsom
Party	Candidate	Votes	%	±%
Conservative	William Keswick	Unopposed		
Conservative hold				

Aston

General election 1906: Epsom
Party	Candidate	Votes	%	±%
Conservative	William Keswick	7,313	54.0	N/A
Liberal	Alfred Withall Aston	6,221	46.0	New
Majority		1,092	8.0	N/A
Turnout		13,534	84.9	N/A
Registered electors		15,933		
Conservative hold		Swing	N/A	

=== Elections in the 1910s ===
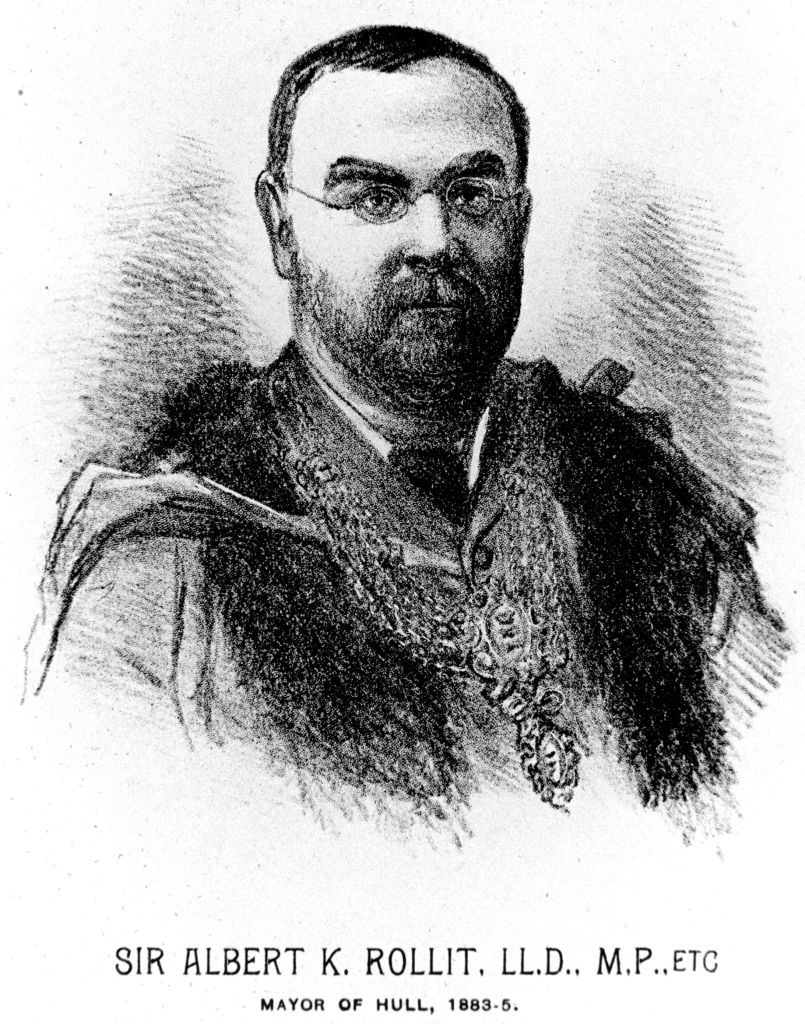
Sir Albert Rollit

General election January 1910: Epsom
Party	Candidate	Votes	%	±%
Conservative	William Keswick	10,919	67.6	+13.6
Liberal	Albert Rollit	5,232	32.4	−13.6
Majority		5,687	35.2	+27.2
Turnout		16,151	85.8	+0.9
Registered electors		18,821		
Conservative hold		Swing	+13.6	

General election December 1910: Epsom
Party	Candidate	Votes	%	±%
Conservative	William Keswick	Unopposed		
Conservative hold				

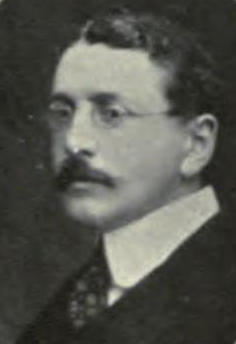
Henry Keswick

1912 Epsom by-election
Party	Candidate	Votes	%	±%
Unionist	Henry Keswick	Unopposed		
Unionist hold				

General election 1914–15:

Another general election was required to take place before the end of 1915. The political parties had been making preparations for an election to take place and by July 1914, the following candidates had been selected;

- Unionist: Henry Keswick

General election 1918: Epsom
Party		Candidate	Votes	%	±%
C	Unionist	Rowland Blades	13,556	73.9	N/A
	Labour	James Chuter Ede	4,796	26.1	New
Majority			8,760	47.8	N/A
Turnout			18,352	56.3	N/A
Registered electors			32,590		
	Unionist hold		Swing	N/A	
C indicates candidate endorsed by the coalition government.

=== Elections in the 1920s ===
General election 1922: Epsom
Party	Candidate	Votes	%	±%
Unionist	Rowland Blades	16,249	71.2	−2.7
Labour	Somerville Hastings	6,571	28.8	+2.7
Majority		9,678	42.4	−5.4
Turnout		22,820	65.3	+9.0
Registered electors		34,945		
Unionist hold		Swing	−2.7	

General election 1923: Epsom
Party	Candidate	Votes	%	±%
Unionist	Rowland Blades	14,230	71.0	−0.2
Labour	John Langdon-Davies	5,807	29.0	+0.2
Majority		8,423	42.0	−0.4
Turnout		20,037	55.6	−9.7
Registered electors		36,055		
Unionist hold		Swing	−0.2	

General election 1924: Epsom
Party	Candidate	Votes	%	±%
Unionist	Rowland Blades	20,017	79.5	+8.5
Labour	Philip Butler	5,149	20.5	−8.5
Majority		14,868	59.0	+17.0
Turnout		25,166	67.1	+11.5
Registered electors		37,515		
Unionist hold		Swing	+8.5	

1928 Epsom by-election
Party	Candidate	Votes	%	±%
Unionist	Archibald Southby	13,364	60.3	−19.2
Liberal	Samuel Parnell Kerr	5,095	23.0	New
Labour	Helen Mary Keynes	3,719	16.8	−3.7
Majority		8,269	37.2	−21.8
Turnout		22,178	51.2	−15.9
Registered electors		43,292		
Unionist hold		Swing	−7.8	

General election 1929: Epsom
Party	Candidate	Votes	%	±%
Unionist	Archibald Southby	24,720	57.8	−21.7
Liberal	Samuel Parnell Kerr	10,422	24.3	N/A
Labour	Stanley Morgan	7,662	17.9	−2.6
Majority		14,298	33.5	−25.5
Turnout		42,804	67.7	+0.6
Registered electors		63,268		
Unionist hold		Swing	−9.6	

=== Elections in the 1930s ===
General election 1931: Epsom
Party	Candidate	Votes	%	±%
Conservative	Archibald Southby	44,076	85.34	
Labour	Stanley Morgan	7,571	14.66	
Majority		36,505	70.68	
Turnout		51,647		
Conservative hold		Swing		

General election 1935: Epsom
Party	Candidate	Votes	%	±%
Conservative	Archibald Southby	49,948	72.14	
Labour	Stanley Morgan	19,286	27.86	
Majority		30,662	44.28	
Turnout		69,234		
Conservative hold		Swing		

General election 1939–40:

Another general election was required to take place before the end of 1940. The political parties had been making preparations for an election to take place and by the Autumn of 1939, the following candidates had been selected;

- Conservative: Archibald Southby
- Labour: C Hackforth-Jones
- Liberal: John Pickering Hughes

=== Elections in the 1940s ===
General election 1945: Epsom
Party	Candidate	Votes	%	±%
Conservative	Archibald Southby	27,081	49.91	
Labour	Edward Shackleton	20,533	37.84	
Liberal	James Morgan Fowler	6,643	12.24	New
Majority		6,548	12.07	
Turnout		54,257	74.87	
Conservative hold		Swing		

1947 Epsom by-election
Party	Candidate	Votes	%	±%
Conservative	Malcolm McCorquodale	33,633	61.0	+11.1
Labour	R. Bishop	17,339	31.5	−6.3
Liberal	David Cairns	4,121	7.5	−4.7
Majority		16,447	29.5	+17.4
Turnout		16,294		
Conservative hold		Swing		

=== Elections in the 1950s ===
General election 1950: Epsom
Party	Candidate	Votes	%	±%
Conservative	Malcolm McCorquodale	33,103	60.73	
Labour	Frank Martin Hardie	15,256	27.99	
Liberal	N. Geoffrey Hudson	6,153	11.29	
Majority		17,847	32.74	
Turnout		54,512		
Conservative hold		Swing		

General election 1951: Epsom
Party	Candidate	Votes	%	±%
Conservative	Malcolm McCorquodale	36,333	68.66	
Labour	Frank Martin Hardie	16,584	31.34	
Majority		19,749	37.32	
Turnout		52,917		
Conservative hold		Swing		

General election 1955: Epsom
Party	Candidate	Votes	%	±%
Conservative	Peter Rawlinson	36,779	71.44	
Labour	Arthur Bertram Spencer Soper	14,706	28.56	
Majority		22,073	42.88	
Turnout		51,485	77.56	
Conservative hold		Swing		

General election 1959: Epsom
Party	Candidate	Votes	%	±%
Conservative	Peter Rawlinson	35,484	62.88	
Labour	D. Eric Heather	11,039	19.56	
Liberal	Robert William M. Walsh	9,910	17.56	New
Majority		24,445	43.32	
Turnout		56,433		
Conservative hold		Swing		

=== Elections in the 1960s ===
General election 1964: Epsom
Party	Candidate	Votes	%	±%
Conservative	Peter Rawlinson	31,959	55.05	
Liberal	Robert William M. Walsh	13,968	24.06	
Labour	Alan Lee Williams	12,131	20.89	
Majority		17,991	30.99	
Turnout		58,058		
Conservative hold		Swing		

General election 1966: Epsom
Party	Candidate	Votes	%	±%
Conservative	Peter Rawlinson	31,434	54.59	
Labour	Cyril Carter	13,841	24.04	
Liberal	Robert William M. Walsh	12,305	21.37	
Majority		17,593	30.55	
Turnout		57,580		
Conservative hold		Swing		

=== Elections in the 1970s ===
General election 1970: Epsom
Party	Candidate	Votes	%	±%
Conservative	Peter Rawlinson	35,541	61.41	
Labour	E. Guy Wilson	12,767	22.06	
Liberal	Peter Hasler Billenness	9,563	16.52	
Majority		22,774	39.35	
Turnout		57,871		
Conservative hold		Swing		

== See also ==
- List of parliamentary constituencies in Surrey
