= Frederick Anderson (footballer) =

Scottish footballer and businessman (1855-1940)

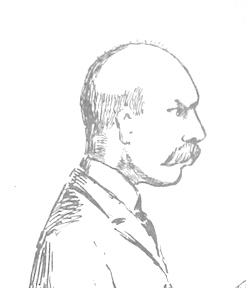

Personal information
- Date of birth: 17 November 1855
- Place of birth: Glasgow, Scotland
- Date of death: 5 January 1940 (aged 84)
- Place of death: Newbury, England
- Position: Forward

Senior career*
Years	Team	Apps	(Gls)
–1872	Clydesdale	0 (Note: The Scottish Football League did not commence play until the 1890–91 season.)	(0)
1872–1873	Queen's Park	0	(0)
1873–	Clydesdale	0	(0)

International career
1874	Scotland	1	(1)
- * Club domestic league appearances and goals

Frederick Anderson

Chairman of the Shanghai Municipal Council
- In office 1899–1900
- Preceded by: James S. Fearon
- Succeeded by: E. A. Hewett
- In office 1904–1906
- Preceded by: William George Bayne
- Succeeded by: Cecil Holliday

Frederick Anderson (17 November 1855 – 5 January 1940) was a Scottish football player and businessman in Shanghai and London. He served two terms as the chairman of the Shanghai Municipal Council.

== Life and career ==
Anderson was born on 17 November 1855 in Glasgow, Scotland, to James Anderson. He was educated at The Glasgow Academy.

Anderson played as a forward for Clydesdale, Queen's Park and represented the Scotland national team once, in an 1874 friendly match against England. He scored Scotland's first goal in a 2–1 win. He also played in the first ever Scottish Cup Final, which his Clydesdale team lost 2–0 to his former club, Queen's Park in 1874.

Anderson moved to Shanghai in the early 1880s to join Messrs Holliday, Wise & Co. At the beginning of 1890 he joined Messrs Ilbert & Co and by 1909 had become the principal partner of the firm.

Anderson served on the Shanghai Municipal Council for eight years from 1892 to 1897. The Municipal Council was the body that ran the Settlement. He was elected chairman in August 1899 following the resignation of James Fearon and served until 1900. He served as chairman again from 1904 to 1906. He was also the local chairman in Shanghai of the China Association.

In 1898-99 and 1908–9, Shanghai Rugby Club chose Frederick Anderson as president in 1905. He had previously played two games of rugby for the second Shanghai Football Club, once in January 1882 and then four years later in January 1886.

He left Shanghai in 1909 and returned to London. In 1919 he was serving as chairman of the China Association in London and in 1922 he was re-elected president of the association.

He died on 5 January 1940.

== Personal life ==
Anderson married Sophia Louisa Le Hunte Ward, daughter of Admiral T. Le Hunte Ward C.B. on 4 June 1896. They had two children Frederick Le Hunte Anderson, and Helen Sophia Anderson.
