= Malcolm McCorquodale, 1st Baron McCorquodale of Newton =

British politician

The Right Honourable The Lord McCorquodale of Newton KCVO PC

Member of Parliament for Epsom
- In office 5 December 1947 – 6 May 1955
- Preceded by: Sir Archibald Southby
- Succeeded by: Peter Rawlinson

Member of Parliament for Sowerby
- In office 28 October 1931 – 15 June 1945
- Preceded by: William John Tout
- Succeeded by: John Belcher

Personal details
- Born: 29 March 1901
- Died: 25 September 1971 (aged 70)
- Spouses: Winnifred Clark (m. 1931; died 1960) Hon Daisy Gibb (m. 1962)
- Children: 2 daughters
- Education: Christ Church, Oxford

Malcolm Stewart McCorquodale, 1st Baron McCorquodale of Newton, KCVO PC (29 March 1901 – 25 September 1971) was a British businessman and Conservative politician.

== Background and education ==
McCorquodale was the son of Norman McCorquodale, of Winslow Hall, Buckinghamshire, and the grandson of George McCorquodale, founder of McCorquodale printers. His mother was Constance Helena, daughter of Edmund Charles Burton. He was educated at Harrow and Christ Church, Oxford.

== Business career ==
McCorquodale was chairman of McCorquodale and Company Ltd, and a director of the Bank of Scotland.

== Political career ==
At the 1931 general election, McCorquodale was elected as Member of Parliament (MP) for Sowerby, and held the seat at the 1935 election. in 1939, he was Parliamentary private secretary (PPS) to the President of the Board of Trade, Oliver Stanley. From 1940 to 1941, he fought in the Second World War as a Flight Lieutenant in the Royal Air Force Volunteer Reserve. From 1942 to 1945, he was PPS to the Minister of Labour, Ernest Bevin. In the Labour Party landslide at the 1945 general election, he lost his seat to Labour's John Belcher. In the same year, he was appointed as a Privy Councillor.

McCorquodale returned to Parliament two years later, when he was elected as MP for in Epsom at a by-election in December 1947, following the resignation of Conservative MP Sir Archibald Southby. He retired from House of Commons at the 1955 general election and in September 1955, he was elevated to the peerage as Baron McCorquodale of Newton, of Newton-le-Willows in the County Palatine of Lancaster.

He was conferred a KCVO in the 1965 Birthday Honours.

== Family ==
Lord McCorquodale married firstly Winifred Sophia Doris, daughter of James Oscar Max Clark, in 1931. They had two daughters, Pamela (b.1934) who married William Forbes of Callendar, and Prudence (b.1936) who married Carel Maurits Mosselmans.

After his first wife's death in November 1960, he married secondly the Honourable Daisy Yoskul Consuelo, daughter of Weetman Pearson, 2nd Viscount Cowdray and widow of both Robert Brampton Gurdon and Alistair Monteith Gibb, in 1962.

Lord McCorquodale died in September 1971, aged 70, when the barony became extinct. Lady McCorquodale died in 1979.

Parliament of the United Kingdom
Preceded by William John Tout	Member of Parliament for Sowerby; 1931–1945	Succeeded by John Belcher
Preceded by Sir Archibald Southby, Bt	Member of Parliament for Epsom; 1947–1955	Succeeded by Peter Rawlinson
Peerage of the United Kingdom
New creation	Baron McCorquodale of Newton; 1955–1971	Extinct
