= Edward Charles Pearce =

Sir Edward Charles Pearce
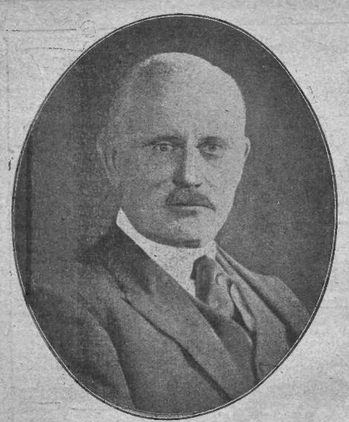

Chairman of the Shanghai Municipal Council
- In office 1913–1920
- Preceded by: Harry De Gray
- Succeeded by: Alfred Brooke-Smith

Personal details
- Born: April 1862 England
- Died: September 8, 1928 (aged 66) England
- Profession: Businessman

Sir Edward Charles Pearce was the chairman of the Shanghai Municipal Council for seven years, serving throughout World War I.

== Biography ==
Pearce was born 1862 in London the son of John Swayne Pearce. He was educated at the Charterhouse School.

Pearce moved to Shanghai in the early 1884 to join the tea firm of Messrs George Oliver & Co. In 1897 he joined Messrs Ilbert & Co., and in 1905 became a partner. He subsequently took over the firm when Frederick Anderson retired in 1920.

He served on the Shanghai Municipal Council from 1911 and, in 1913, became chairman serving throughout World War I, stepping down at the beginning of 1920. For this service the Shanghai Ratepayers Meeting unanimously resolved that he be granted the Freedom of Shanghai, a unique distinction. In 1922, he was knighted for his services and was awarded by the Chinese government the 4th Class Order of Chiaho.

He left Shanghai in 1922 and returned to England, where he settled down near London in Little Portnall, Wentworth, Virginia Water.

He died on 8 September 1928 in England.

== Marriage ==
Pearce married Marion Everett in 1894. They had two children. One, a baby, was drowned and the other was killed in action in World War I in France.
