= John Hellyer Liddell =

John Liddell
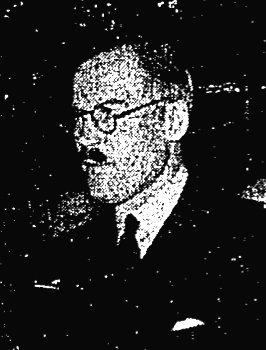

Chairman of the Shanghai Municipal Council
- In office May 1941 – January 1942
- Preceded by: William Johnston Keswick
- Succeeded by: Katsuo Okazaki

Personal details
- Born: 29 June 1899 Shanghai, China
- Died: 24 January 1984 (aged 84) Alameda, California
- Relations: Sir Charles Oswald Liddell (grandfather); Ian Oswald Liddell (Cousin)
- Profession: Businessman

John Hellyer Liddell CBE (29 June 1899 – 24 January 1984) was businessman who served as the last British chairman of the Shanghai Municipal Council from 1941 to 1942.

== Life ==
Liddell was born on 29 June 1899 in Shanghai. He was the son of John and Marion (Hellyer) Liddell. He was educated at Marlborough College, departing in 1919. He joined the family firm of Liddell Bros which had been established in Shanghai in the 1880s by his uncle C. Oswald Liddell. His father had joined the firm in 1888. In 1932, he became managing director or Liddell Bros & Co Ltd.

In 1941, he was chosen to be the Chairman of the Shanghai Municipal Council. (Technically, he was Chairman of the Provisional Council that had been established to take over from the SMC.) He was chairman when the Japanese occupied the Shanghai International Settlement on 8 December 1941 at the start of the Pacific War. He remained in position until 5 January 1942, when he and all other British and American members of the council resigned. Katsuo Okazaki was appointed in his place.

Liddell was interned in Shanghai for the duration of the war. Following the war, he moved to California.

Liddell was appointed a CBE in 1947.

== Marriage ==
He married Grace Coutts in Shanghai on 21 November 1927.

== Death ==
Liddell died on 21 January 1984, aged 84, in Alameda, California.
