= Francis Bulkeley Johnson =

British businessman (1828–1887)

Francis Bulkeley Johnson (1828–1887) was member of the Jardine, Matheson & Co. and member of the Legislative Council of Hong Kong.

== Biography ==
Johnson joined the Jardine, Matheson & Co. in 1861 and was later admitted as a partner in 1866 when James MacAndrew ceased to be with the company.

Johnson was appointed to the Legislative Council of Hong Kong on 17 May 1881, during William Keswick's absence on leave. He also acted as Hawaiian Consulate General and Danish Consulate for William Keswick in 1881. He was also Chairman of the Hong Kong General Chamber of Commerce between 1882 and 1883.

During his service on the Legislative Council, he introduced the bill for the Tramways Ordinance for the construction of the Hongkong Tramways in 1881. The bill was subsequently passed in June 1883 and the tramways were operated in 1904. In 1883, he was also appointed to the commission of inquiring the alleged opium smuggling as well as other goods from Hong Kong into China.

In December 1883, the government enacted the Johnson's Wharves and Piers Ordinance to authorise Johnson to construct piers and wharves in the Victoria Harbour for the Jardine, Matheson & Co.

Bulkeley Street in Hung Hom, Kowloon was named after him. His son, Charles Bulkeley Bulkeley-Johnson, was a highly decorated British cavalry general who died in the First World War.

== See also ==
- W. H. Wardley and Company - the company which John Bowman and F. B. Johnson acquired from William Henry Wardley and with which they purchased Marine Lot no. 104 (Wardley House)

Legislative Council of Hong Kong
Preceded by William Keswick	Unofficial Member; 1878	Succeeded by William Keswick
Preceded by William Keswick	Unofficial Member; 1881–1884	Succeeded by William Keswick
