= Henry Keswick (politician) =

British politician (1870–1928)

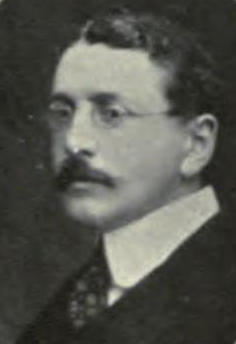
- Henry Keswick

Member of Parliament for Epsom
- In office 1912–1918
- Preceded by: William Keswick
- Succeeded by: Rowland Blades

Provisional Unofficial Member of the Executive Council of Hong Kong
- In office 10 March 1908 – 9 May 1908
- Preceded by: Edbert Ansgar Hewett
- Succeeded by: Henry Spencer Berkeley
- In office 5 May 1910 – 1910
- Preceded by: Catchick Paul Chater
- Succeeded by: Catchick Paul Chater

Unofficial Member of the Legislative Council of Hong Kong
- In office 23 May 1907 – 20 April 1911
- Preceded by: William Jardine Gresson
- Succeeded by: Charles Henderson Ross

Chairman of the Shanghai Municipal Council
- In office August 1906 – May 1907
- Preceded by: Cecil Holliday
- Succeeded by: David Landale

Chairman of the Hongkong & Shanghai Banking Corporation
- In office February 1908 – February 1909
- Preceded by: G. H. Medhurst
- Succeeded by: William Jardine Gresson

Personal details
- Born: 1870 Shanghai, China
- Died: 29 November 1928 (aged 57 or 58) London, England
- Party: Conservative
- Spouse: Ida Wynifred Johnston
- Children: David; Tony; John
- Parent(s): William Keswick; Amelia Sophie Dubeux

Henry Keswick (1870 – 29 November 1928) was a British Conservative politician and businessman and member of the Executive Council and Legislative Council of Hong Kong.

== Biography ==
Henry Keswick the first-born and only surviving son of William Keswick by his first wife Amelia Sophie Dubeux (d. 1883), born in 1870 in Shanghai, into the Keswick business dynasty. He was educated at Eton College and graduated with a B.A. at Trinity College, Cambridge in 1892, of which he took his M.A. degree later. He was commissioned as a lieutenant in the 3rd (Militia) Battalion of the King's Own Scottish Borderers on 25 February 1893. The battalion was embodied after the outbreak of the Second Boer War in late 1899, and he left Queenstown for South Africa on the SS Kildonan Castle with other men of the battalion in March 1900. He saw active service and was promoted to a captain. After the war had ended, he resigned his commission on 2 August 1902. He rejoined the battalion during the First World War in which he commanded until its disbandment. He was also a member of the Royal Company of Archers, a ceremonial unit that serves as the sovereign's bodyguard in Scotland.

He joined the family business and spent two years in the New York office of Jardines before he arrived in Hong Kong in 1895, the year before his Uncle James Johnstone Keswick left and became the taipan of the Jardine. During his time in the Far East, he went to Shanghai and became the chairman of the Shanghai Municipal Council from 24 August 1906 and served until May 1907. He was also chairman of the Shanghai Chamber of Commerce.

He was appointed as Unofficial Member of the Legislative and Executive Councils during his time in Hong Kong. He was also vice-chairman of the Hong Kong General Chamber of Commerce and chairman of the Hongkong and Shanghai Banking Corporation, and Hongkong and Whampoa Dock Company as well as other numerous public companies. After he returned to England, he became the first chairman of the Far Eastern Section of the London Chamber of Commerce and member of the London Committee of the Hongkong and Shanghai Banking Corporation.

He returned to England in 1911 to represent Hong Kong at the coronation of King George V. He was still in England when his father died and succeeded him as the member of Parliament for the Conservative and Unionist in at the Epsom by-election in 1912, and held the seat until 1918. He was also member of the county council of Dumfriesshire, where he spent most of his latter life.

In 1922, he returned to Hong Kong and the Far East in his yacht "Cutty Sark". He remained a director of Jardines until his death on 29 November 1928 in London.

== Family ==
He married Ida Wynifred Johnston (born c.1880) in 1900 and had three children:

- David Johnston (1902 Yokohama – 1976); married Nony or Nonie Barbara Pease, and had children, including Amelia Sophia or Sophy Keswick whose children include: Percy Weatherall (b. 1957), Mrs Catherine Soames and Isobel, Countess of Strathmore and Kinghorne and another son.
- Sir William Johnston "Tony" Keswick (1903 Yokohama – 16 February 1990, London), a Taipan of Jardine Matheson 1934–1941; married Mary Etheldreda Lindley, and had 3 sons: Henry Keswick (knighted 2009 Birthday Honours), Sir Chips Keswick, and Simon Keswick. His eldest and youngest sons were Tai-Pans. Two of his grandsons are based in Hong Kong, working for Jardine Matheson, one of whom, Ben Keswick, is the present Tai-pan in Hong Kong.
- Sir John Henry Keswick KCMG (1906 Dumfriesshire – 1982, Dumfriesshire) KCMG 1972, Tai-Pan of Jardine Matheson 1941–1953; married 1940 Clare Mary Alice Elwes (1906–1998), and had children the gardening author Maggie Keswick Jencks (1941–1995). Father and daughter founded the Keswick Foundation, and Maggie Jencks established Maggie's Centres to help cancer victims, before her own death. Maggie was married to landscape architect Charles Jencks, and left children.

Legislative Council of Hong Kong
Preceded by William Jardine Gresson	Unofficial Member; 1907–1908	Succeeded by William Jardine Gresson
Preceded by William Jardine Gresson	Unofficial Member; 1910–1911	Succeeded by Charles Henderson Ross
Business positions
Preceded by G. H. Medhurst	Chairman of the Hongkong and Shanghai Banking Corporation; 1908–1909	Succeeded by William Jardine Gresson
Parliament of the United Kingdom
Preceded by William Keswick	Member of Parliament for Epsom; 1912–1918	Succeeded by Rowland Blades
