= James Fearon (businessman) =

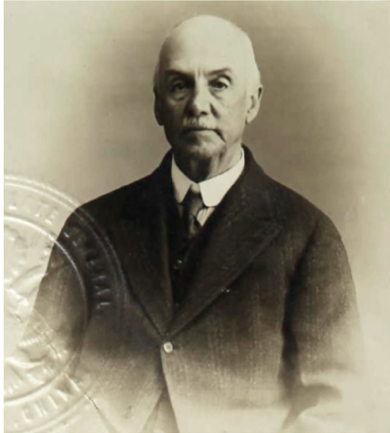

Chairman of the Shanghai Municipal Council
- In office January 1898 – August 1899
- Preceded by: Albert Burkill
- Succeeded by: Frederick Anderson

Personal details
- Born: February 12, 1849 Sydney, Australia
- Died: October 26, 1920 (aged 71) Tianjin, China
- Profession: Businessman

James Sturgis Fearon (February 12, 1849 – October 26, 1920) was the chairman of the Shanghai Municipal Council from 1898 to 1899.

== Biography ==
Fearon was born in Sydney, New South Wales, Australia, the youngest son of Christopher Fearon and Grace Fearon.

Fearon moved to Shanghai at the age of 21 in 1870 and joined the staff of Augustin, Heard & Co in the tea department. When that firm went out of business, he formed the firm of Fearon, Lowe & co with Mr E.G. Lowe. After Lowe's death he was joined in partnership by Mr Daniel and in 1880, Fearon, Daniel & Co was established. In 1900 he moved to New York City to run Fearon Daniel & Co's business there. He returned to China in 1910 and was principally based in Tianjin. He naturalised as an American in 1903.

In his younger days, Fearon was an active member of the Victoria Company of the Shanghai Fire Brigade. Later, he was part of a committee that was responsible for creating the public recreation ground at the Shanghai Race Course. He was later a steward of the Shanghai Race Club.

Fearon was elected to and became chairman of the Shanghai Municipal Council in January 1898 and served until August 1899 when he resigned. He was replaced as chairman by Frederick Anderson.

Fearon died on October 26, 1920, in Tianjin. His grave was destroyed along with the cemetery during the Cultural Revolution.

== Marriage ==
Fearon married Emily Wood. They had two sons and one daughter. Emily died in 1934 in Shanghai and was buried at the Hongqiao Road Cemetery.
