= 1947 Epsom by-election =

UK parliamentary by-election

The 1947 Epsom by-election was a parliamentary by-election held in the United Kingdom on 4 December 1947 to fill the vacant House of Commons seat of Epsom in Surrey. The vacancy arose when the sitting Member of Parliament (MP), Sir Archibald Southby resigned from the House of Commons by accepting the Stewardship of the Chiltern Hundreds.

== Result ==
The Conservative Party held the seat with a significantly increased majority.

Epsom by-election, 1947
Party	Candidate	Votes	%	±%
Conservative	Malcolm McCorquodale	33,633	61.0	+11.1
Labour	R Bishop	17,339	31.5	−6.3
Liberal	David Arnold Scott Cairns	4,121	7.5	−4.7
Majority		16,447	29.5	+17.4
Turnout		16,294		
Conservative hold		Swing		
