= William George Bayne =

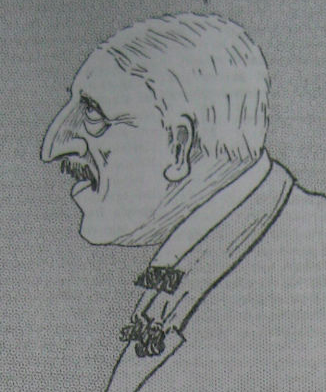

Chairman of the Shanghai Municipal Council
- In office 1902–1904
- Preceded by: John Prentice
- Succeeded by: Frederick Anderson

Personal details
- Died: March 27, 1910 East Croydon
- Profession: Businessman

William George ("Willie") Bayne (died 1910) was the chairman of the Shanghai Municipal Council between 1902 and 1904.

== Biography ==
Bayne moved to Shanghai in 1864 to join the Bank of Hindustan, China and Japan. About four years after his arrival, owing to a crisis the bank closed. Bayne then joined the North China Insurance Company and stayed with the company for the rest of his career, serving in Yokohama, Singapore, Shanghai and London. From 1900 to 1908 he acted as secretary of the company in Shanghai. On 10 April 1908, he returned to England and continued to work for the company as its London agent.

He served on the Shanghai Municipal Council and was chairman from 1902 to 1904.

He was also president of the Amateur Dramatic Club in Shanghai. He was considered to be one of the best amateur actors in the East, and on his return to Shanghai from Yokohama, one newspaper reported that the "gaiety of Shanghai has been permanently enhanced by the return of W.G. Bayne."

Bayne died on 27 March 1910 in east Croydon, London
