= John Prentice (businessman) =

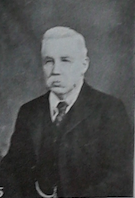

Chairman of the Shanghai Municipal Council
- In office 1901–1902
- Preceded by: Edbert Ansgar Hewett
- Succeeded by: William George Bayne

Personal details
- Born: 7 August 1847 Beattock, Scotland
- Died: 30 April 1925 (aged 77) Shanghai
- Profession: Businessman

John Prentice (1847–1925) was a Scottish engineer and business executive. He was the chairman of the Shanghai Municipal Council between 1901 and 1902.

== Biography ==
Prentice was born on 7 August 1847 in Beattock, Scotland, and educated at Greenock.

Prentice moved to Shanghai in 1870 to join Muirhead & Co., which was absorbed later by Boyd & Co.; Boyd & Co. was subsequently absorbed by Shanghai Dock and Engineering Co., a major shipbuilding company. Prentice rose through the ranks to become the controlling interest and principal of the firm.

He served on the Shanghai Municipal Council and was chairman from 1901 to 1902.

He died on 30 April 1925 following an attack of pneumonia in Shanghai. He was buried in Bubbling Well Cemetery.

A bust of Prentice was placed in the hall of the French Club in Shanghai following his death. A stained glass window in memoriam of Prentice was placed in the Union Church in Shanghai. Route Prentice (now Jinxian Road) in the Shanghai French Concession was named after Prentice.

== Marriage ==
Prentice married Jane Ann Law, the former wife of Alexander Law. She died in 1935 and was buried in the Prentice family plot with her husband.
