= Charles Bulkeley-Johnson =

British Army general (1867–1917)

Brigadier-General Charles Bulkeley-Johnson
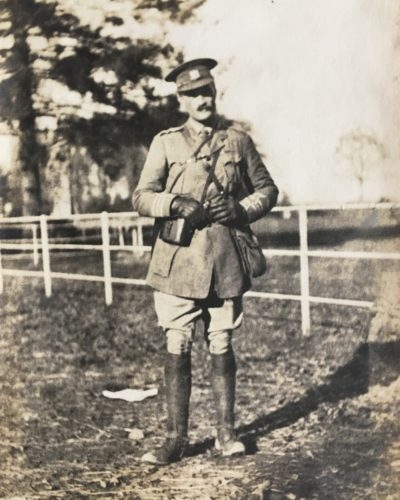
- Bulkeley-Johnson om October 1914
- Born: 19 November 1867; Shanghai, China
- Died: 11 April 1917 (aged 49); Brussels, Belgium
- Education: Royal Military College, Sandhurst
- Military career
- Allegiance: United Kingdom
- Branch: British Army
- Service years: 1887–1917
- Rank: Brigadier-General
- Awards: Order of St George Cross

Brigadier-General Charles Bulkeley Bulkeley-Johnson (19 November 1867 – 11 April 1917) was a British Army officer who served in the Mahdist War and the First World War, he was killed in action on 11 April 1917, while commanding the 8th Cavalry Brigade, on the second day of the Battle of Arras.

He is the only foreigner to receive the Russian Imperial Order of St. George Cross, — the highest military order, in both fourth and third class, for his bravery in First World War

== Biography ==
The son of Francis Bulkeley Johnson, he was born in 1867. He was educated at Harrow School and graduated from the Royal Military College, Sandhurst.

Bulkeley-Johnson was commissioned as a second lieutenant into the 2nd Dragoons (Royal Scots Greys) on 5 February 1887, promoted to lieutenant on 16 March 1889 and to captain on 13 June 1894. He served in the Egyptian Army from January 1899 to January 1903, during which he participated in the Nile Expedition. He also participated in operations that resulted in the defeat of the Khalifa, when he was in command of a squadron of cavalry during the Battle of Umm Diwaykarat on 25 November 1899 (mentioned in despatches 25 November 1899). Promotion to major came on 17 September 1902. On 19 August 1911, at 43 years of age, Bulkeley-Johnson was appointed as the commanding officer of the Royal Scots Greys. On 13 November 1914, after receiving a promotion to the temporary rank of brigadier-general, he was promoted to be the general officer commanding (GOC) of the 8th Cavalry Brigade of the 3rd Cavalry Division and he commanded this brigade until his death. He was promoted to substantive colonel on 19 August 1915.

For his exploits he has been awarded the two Crosses of the Russian Order of St. George — which makes him the only Allied Officer during WWI ever to achieve such a level of recognition.

On 11 April 1917, during the Battle of Arras, British infantry were pinned down in front of the village of Monchy under very heavy machine-gun fire from the north ridge of Scarpe. The General was mortally wounded and died at age 49 in Monchy-le-Preux, France. His burial site is the Gouy-en-Artois Communal Cemetery Extension. An account of General Bulkeley-Johnson's death is related in detail in And All For What? by D.W.J Cuddeford.
