= China Association =

British merchants association

The China Association was a British merchants association established to represent the interests of British companies trading with China, Hong Kong and Japan. Members of the association included representatives of the large China Houses such as Swire & Sons; Jardine, Matheson & Co; Paton & Baldwins and Shell Petroleum, in addition to Members of Parliament and retired consular and military officials returned from service in the Far East.

The work of the China Association was to lobby the British Government and the authorities in China on behalf of its members. The Association often acted in conjunction with the London Chamber of Commerce, local Chambers and the Federation of British Industries.

== Foundation ==
A proposal for the formation of a 'China Association' was made at an inaugural dinner held for 'gentlemen with some connection to the Far East', at the Thatched House Club in London, on 4 March 1889. The China Association was formally constituted at a meeting held on 11 April 1889. The first chairman was Sir Alfred Dent. The first Annual Dinner of the China Association was held in March 1890. Within the first year, the China Association enrolled 111 members. Elections for officers were held annually. The association was funded through entrance fees, membership subscriptions and by donation, with funds managed by The Hongkong and Shanghai Banking Corporation.

== Growth ==
Between 1892 and 1893, invitations were sent out to British residents in Hong Kong, China and Japan to form branch associations. The Shanghai Committee was constituted in December 1892, followed by Yokohama in the same year and Hong Kong in June 1893. By 1895, membership stood at over 400 and its General Committee was seen as the recognised representative of British commercial interests in China.

== Encouragement of Chinese language studies ==
In 1898, the China Association founded its Incorporated School of Practical Chinese. In 1917, this was merged with the School of Oriental Studies, where the Mandarin dialect was taught in the Far Eastern Department.

== Divisions ==
By 1900, the association's strategy towards the British Government led to a division within the leadership of the association. Against the background of growing fear of commercial competition from Russia, France and Japan, certain members of the General Committee and Shanghai Committee felt that the association's influence with the Foreign Office was exaggerated, and that the Government was failing to effectively represent British mercantile interests in China. It was felt that public pressure was needed to push the Government into action. Sir Edward Ackroyd suggested that the association change its strategy and reorganise into a 'League'. This proposal was voted down. The insurgents formed the China League, with R.A. Yerburgh as Chairman and George Jamieson as Secretary.

In 1903-4, the Shanghai Committee called for the amalgamation of China Association with the China League. A Special General Meeting was called, but again the proposal was voted down by a narrow margin. The China League later did merge with the China Association.

== After World War II ==
In the aftermath of World War II, with the Communist advance across China and the Nationalist blockade of important cities such as Shanghai, the China Association worked to alert the British Government to the increasingly difficult circumstances under which British firms operated. Between 1950 and 1952, many British firms left China, and the Association acted to ensure that official action was taken to protect British assets and concerns and to meet demands for compensation.

== Present ==
The China Association continues to exist. It holds quarterly lunches with a prominent guest speaker to share his thoughts, insight and wisdom on China. Sir Andrew Burns is the president, James Richards is the chairman.

== Archives ==
The archives of the association are lodged with the School of Oriental and African Studies in London.
