= 1912 Epsom by-election =

UK Parliamentary by-election

The 1912 Epsom by-election was held in Epsom on 21 March 1912. The by-election was held due to the death of the incumbent Conservative MP, William Keswick. It was won by his son the Conservative candidate Henry Keswick, who was unopposed.
