= E. A. Hewett =

British merchant (1860–1915)

Edbert Ansgar Hewett CMG
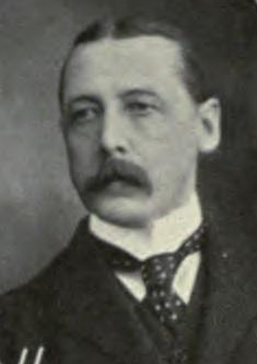

Unofficial Member of the Executive Council of Hong Kong
- In office 1 June 1906 – 24 November 1915
- Appointed by: Sir Matthew Nathan; Sir Frederick Lugard
- Preceded by: C. W. Dickson
- Succeeded by: E. H. Sharp

Unofficial Member of the Legislative Council of Hong Kong
- In office 17 May 1906 – 28 October 1915
- Appointed by: Sir Matthew Nathan
- Preceded by: R. G. Shewan
- Succeeded by: P. H. Holyoak

Chairman of the Shanghai Municipal Council
- In office January 1900 – 25 January 1901
- Preceded by: Frederick Anderson
- Succeeded by: John Prentice

Personal details
- Born: 5 September 1860 England
- Died: 24 November 1915 (aged 55) British Hong Kong
- Resting place: Protestant cemetery
- Spouse(s): Ruth Jeannette, née McKendrick
- Occupation: Businessman

Edbert Ansgar Hewett, CMG, FRGS (5 September 1860 – 24 November 1915) was a prominent British merchant in Hong Kong and China and member of the Executive Council and Legislative Council of Hong Kong.

== Family and early life ==
Hewett was born on 5 September 1860, second son of the Sir George John Routledge Hewett, 3rd Baronet., descent of Sir George Hewett, 1st Baronet, and Clara von Pochammer. On 2 February 1893 he married Ruth Jeannette McKendrick, daughter of Quentin K. McKendrick of New York.

He was educated mainly by private tutors. At the age of seventeen he joined the Peninsular and Oriental Steam Navigation Company at their head office in London. He arrived in Hong Kong in 1880 and acted as agent for the company in Shanghai for seven-year, in Yokohama for two years, and in Kobe for six months. He became the Superintendent of P&O Co. Hong Kong branch, responsible for the whole traffic in the Far East from Yokohama to Penang.

== Shanghai ==
Hewett was the member of the Shanghai Municipal Council from 1897 to 1901 and served as chairman in 1900 to 1901. During the Boxer Rebellion he was active in preparations for the defence of the Settlement when the naval fleet sailed to Peking leaving about 12,000 white population and nearly half a million Chinese under his charge. As civil commandant of the volunteers he enrolled all able-bodied men and had a force of nearly 1,200 whites under arms. He also organised the first company of Japanese volunteers that had ever been raised outside Japan. The highest encomiums were passed upon him by both the naval and military authorities.

He took great interest of conservancy of the Huangpu River throughout his residence in Shanghai. He was on the committee of the Shanghai Chamber of Commerce and represented the chamber at Peking in 1901 to urge for the Shanghai river conservancy as dealt with in Peace Protocol after the Boxer Rebellion. A special committee consisting of the English, German, American, French and Dutch ministers was formed as a result and adopted Hewett's proposals as the chamber's representative which were embodied in the protocol.

== Hong Kong ==
Hewett moved to Hong Kong and was elected vice-chairman of the Hong Kong General Chamber of Commerce shortly afterward in 1902. He was the longest serving chairman of the Hong Kong General Chamber of Commerce from 1903 to 1915. Hewett represented the Chamber of Commerce in the Legislative Council of Hong Kong from 26 April 1906 and later was appointed to the Executive Council on 1 June 1906. He was also an unofficial member of the Sanitary Board from 1903 and member of the Medical Board and the Licensing Board until his death in 1915. He was the chairman of the commission from May 1906 to March 1907 to inquire into administration of Sanitary and Building Regulations, enacted by the Public Health and Building Ordinance of 1903, which report in March uncovered widespread corruption among officials.

He was also on the governing board of the Queen's College and committee of the Diocesan Boys' School.

For his services to Hong Kong he received the Companion of the Order of St Michael and St George in 1912.

He died suddenly at 12:40 pm on 24 November 1915 of malaria at the age of 55 at the Government Civil Hospital. He was buried at the Protestant cemetery at Happy Valley. All flags in the colony were at half-mast throughout the day.

== Honours ==
He received the English Medal for China, 4th Class Sacred Treasure of Japan, Iron Crown of Austria and decorated as a Knight of the Order of Orange-Nassau of the Netherlands for his services in Shanghai.

- Justice of Peace
- Companion of the Order of St Michael and St George (CMG)
- English Medal for China 1900
- Iron Crown of Austria (3rd Class) – 1902 – in recognition of services rendered during the recent Military Operations in China.
- Knight of the Order of Orange-Nassau
- Imperial Japanese Order of the Sacred Treasure (4th Class) – 1902 – in recognition of valuable services ... during the disturbances in China in the year 1900.
- Fellow of the Royal Geographical Society (F.R.G.S.)

Political offices
Preceded by Frederick Anderson	Chairman of the Shanghai Municipal Council; 1900–1901	Succeeded by John Prentice
Preceded by Charles Wedderburn Dickson	Unofficial Member of the Executive Council of Hong Kong; 1906–1915	Succeeded by Ernest Hamilton Sharp
Legislative Council of Hong Kong
Preceded by Robert Gordon Shewan	Unofficial Member; Representative for Hong Kong General Chamber of Commerce; 1906–1915	Succeeded by Percy Hobson Holyoak
