= Alexander Myburgh =

British barrister

Chairman of the Shanghai Municipal Council
- In office 1883–1884
- Preceded by: W.C. Ward
- Succeeded by: James Johnstone Keswick

Personal details
- Died: July 31, 1889 (aged 41) Margate
- Profession: Barrister

Alexander Myburgh (1848–1889) was a British barrister who served as the chairman of the Shanghai Municipal Council from 1883 to 1884.

== Early life ==
Myburgh was born in 1848. He was the fifth surviving son of Francis Gerhard Myburgh. He was educated at Trinity Hall, Cambridge where he obtained an LLB. He was called as a barrister of the Inner Temple in 1871

== Life in Shanghai ==
Myburgh moved to Shanghai from Japan in the 1870s to practice as a barrister. He first entered practice with Mr R.W.M. Bird and then with Mr Cowie. In 1880 and 1881 he acted as the Crown Advocate of the British Supreme Court for China and Japan, while the Crown Advocate, Nicholas Hannen was on leave.

In 1883, Myburgh was elected Chairman of the Shanghai Municipal Council and served in that position for one year.

== Death ==
Myburgh died in July 1889, in Margate, England.
