= Cutty Sark (yacht) =

History

United Kingdom
- Name: Cutty Sark
- Builder: Yarrow and Co Ltd
- Launched: 18 March 1920
- Sponsored by: Major Henry Keswick
- Fate: Scrapped, 1948

General characteristics
- Tonnage: 883
- Length: 263 ft (80 m)
- Beam: 25 ft (7.6 m)
- Draught: 16 ft (4.9 m)
- Propulsion: 4 Yarrow turbines of 5,000BHP
- Speed: 24 knots (44 km/h; 28 mph)
- Range: 3,391 nmi (6,280 km; 3,902 mi)

Not to be confused with the famous tea clipper, the private steam yacht Cutty Sark was built, from plates originally destined for an S class destroyer, by Yarrow Shipbuilders of Scotstoun for Major Henry Keswick (1870–1928) of Jardines. She was launched on 18 March 1920.

She had a length of 263 ft (80 m); beam of 25 ft (7.6 m) and draught of 16 ft (4.9 m), and a gross registered tonnage of 883. Originally she had 4 Yarrow turbines of 5,000 bhp (3,700 kW) giving her a speed of 24 knots (44 km/h). Though fast, she was uncomfortable in anything like a sea.

== Circumnavigation ==
Major Keswick took her on a round the world voyage to visit Jardines interests in the Far East. She left Stranraer on 4 November 1920 and arrived back at that port on 26 July 1921. The route followed was through the Mediterranean to the Far East, arriving in Hong Kong on 20 January 1921, and finally leaving Yokohama for home via Panama on 25 May 1921. Whilst in the Far East she visited Korea, Hankou, Weihaiwei, Qingdao, Tianjin, Kurhashi-shima, Awashima and Shōdoshima. The longest non-stop run was 3,391 nautical miles (6,280 km) from Yokohama to Honolulu.

== Duke of Westminster's yacht ==
In 1926 the Duke of Westminster acquired the Cutty Sark, cruising her from North Norway to the Red Sea. Up to the Second World War, she became a familiar sight at Cowes, Biarritz, the Mediterranean and the west coast of Scotland. She was captained by Lieutenant Commander Richard Herbert Mack RN (Retd) who had been mentioned in despatches during World War I.

In Noël Coward's play, Private Lives, set on the Riviera, in the first-act balcony scene Amanda asks; "Whose yacht is that?" "The Duke of Westminster's I expect", Elyot replies "It always is."

During this period she hosted many famous people including the Churchills, Coco Chanel, and, in September 1935, the Prince of Wales and Wallis Simpson. They took a short cruise to Corsica with, among others, Katherine Rogers, John Aird, Gladys Buist, Helen Fitzgerald and Lord Sefton.

In February 1930 the Duke married Loelia Ponsonby in London. After the ceremony, the happy couple made their way to Westminster Pier, from where the Duke piloted his bride by high speed launch to the Cutty Sark, moored at Deptford. Unfortunately the bride was extremely seasick during the Channel crossing.

== Wartime service ==
On the outbreak of war in September 1939 the Cutty Sark was requisitioned by the Admiralty, still captained by Cdr Mack, and sent to Thorneycroft's at Southampton to be fitted out and armed as an Anti-Submarine vessel. Armament included a 4 in gun, a 2-pounder AA, two 0.5 in AAs, two 0.5 in MGs, and some depth charge racks. Most of her peacetime equipment was put into store at Thorneycroft's.

In 1940 she was converted into a submarine tender and attached to the 3rd Submarine Flotilla. She was crewed by the Royal Naval Patrol Service. She was paid off on 23 August 1944.

The Duke of Westminster sold the Cutty Sark to Cdr Mack in 1941, so at that stage he owned the warship he commanded. The ship was eventually acquired by the Ministry of War Transport in 1942.

Her war service was mainly routine escort work, and she is mentioned several times in this capacity in Edward Young's book, One of Our Submarines.

However, in May 1940 she was ordered to Dunkirk, but then diverted to Saint Malo to destroy some radio masts, which was successfully achieved. While she was alongside the quay she was dive bombed blowing in the side of the ship and flooding the engine room. The engines being out of action, a "V&W" destroyer, HMS Viscount towed her back to Devonport in two days for repairs.

In late October 1942 an Armstrong Whitworth Whitley on anti-submarine patrol came down in the Bay of Biscay. The crew took to their life raft and were located by a Lockheed Hudson. However, there were no nearby ships to rescue them so the Cutty Sark was scrambled from Holy Loch. The crew were picked up after 84 hours in the water on 2 November 1942 and taken to Plymouth. After 3 weeks in naval hospital they were found by the RAF and transferred to Weston-super-Mare. From there they were posted to No. 9 Squadron RAF at RAF Waddington and then RAF Bardney in Lincoln. They named their new Avro Lancaster Cutty Sark. It flew 30 missions before being shot down.

Cutty Sark also appears, by name, in the 1943 film, Close Quarters.

By 1944 the need for requisitioned vessels had diminished, and HMS Cutty Sark was laid up at King's Lynn and used by the Sea Cadets.

== Post-World War II ==
In 1946 she was acquired, in an unseaworthy condition, as a training ship by the Jewish Marine League. The League had been founded in 1934 with the aim of training boys for a future Israeli merchant marine. The original intention was to call her Tarshish, but a decision was taken to name her after Joseph Hertz 1872–1946, Chief Rabbi of the British Commonwealth 1913–1946. To raise funds for the enterprise, the League held a concert of Jewish Music at the Royal Albert Hall on 5 February 1946 with the London Symphony Orchestra conducted by Anatole Fistoulari.

In July 1946 some forty boys arrived at King's Lynn to join the ship. These boys had come from the continent and were all displaced persons; some of them had been in German concentration and labour Camps. Captain A Stratton RN was appointed Captain Superintendent. While at King's Lynn, it was decided to remove the engines and boilers in order to provide recreation space. When this work was completed, the ship was towed to Grays, taking up the moorings previously used by the Marine Society's Training Ship Warspite. Training the boys for sea service continued for some twelve months by which time most of them were over seventeen years of age and ready for sea. However, there was great difficulty in placing boys with shipping companies and it was decided not to continue with the venture and the ship closed at the end of June 1947.

She was sold to Thos. W. Ward, shipbreakers, and moved to their operation in September at their yard at Grays, Essex. The scrapping of Cutty Sark was completed by April 1948.

== Bibliography ==
Books

- Jardine Matheson: Robert Blake (Weidenfeld & Nicolson, 1999)
- One of Our Submarines: Edward Young, Commander DSO DSC RNV(S)R First published 1952; Penguin Edition (Penguin No 1000) published 1954
- Bendor the Golden Duke of Westminster – Leslie Field (Weidenfeld & Nicolson, 1983)
- Thames Training Ships" (1961); Training Ships of Thurrock
- The Final Berth – Columbia Wharf Shipbreaking at Thos. W. Ward Limited, Grays, by John M Ormston
- Michael Harrison Lord of London (W H Challon, 1966)
- Wallis and Edward: Letters 1931–1937 Ed: Michael Bloch, Weidenfeldt & Nicolson 1986 ISBN 0297788043

Newspapers

- The Celestial Empire, Shanghai
- Jewish Chronicle
- New York Times
- The PLA Monthly
- The Times

Databases and Museums

- British Pathé Database Record
- Caird Library, National Maritime Museum
- Churchill Archives Centre, Cambridge
- Imperial War Museum
- Institute of Contemporary History and Weiner Library
- Jabotinsky Institute in Israel
- Lincolnshire County Council (the Brownlow Archives)
- The National Archives (ADM files)
- Victoria and Albert Museum (Windsor Collection: Photographs Second Series)

Film

- Close Quarters (UK 1943)
