= William Keswick =

British politician (1934–1912)

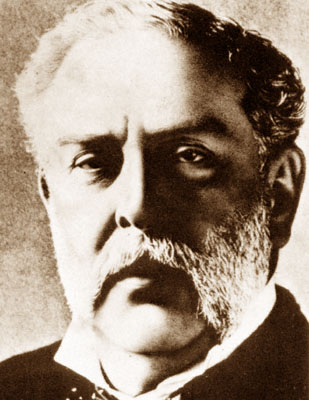
- Born: 15 April 1834
- Died: 9 March 1912 (aged 77)
- Spouses: Amelie Sophie Dubeux; Alice Henrietta Barrington
- Children: 7, including Henry Keswick

William Keswick (15 April 1834 – 9 March 1912) was a British Conservative politician and businessman, patriarch of the Keswick family, an influential shipping family in Hong Kong associated with Jardine Matheson Holdings.

== Biography ==
Keswick was born in 1834 in Dumfriesshire in the Scottish Lowlands. His grandmother, Jean Jardine Johnstone, was an older sister of Dr. William Jardine, co-founder of Jardine Matheson. His father Thomas Keswick, from Dumfriesshire had married Jardine's niece and daughter of Jean, Margaret Johnstone, and entered the Jardine business. The company operated as merchant traders and had a major influence in the First and Second Opium Wars although the company stopped this trading in 1870 to pursue a broad range of trades including shipping, railways, textiles and property development.

William arrived in China and Hong Kong in 1855, the first of six generations of the Keswick family to be associated with Jardines. He established a Jardine Matheson office in Yokohama, Japan, in 1859. He returned to Hong Kong to become a partner of the firm in 1862. He became managing partner or tai-pan of the firm in 1874 until his departure in 1886. He left Hong Kong in 1886 to take control of Matheson & Co. in London responsible only to the firm's senior partner Sir Robert Jardine (1825–1905). He remained the firm's managing director until his death in 1912. Keswick also served as a director in the then British-based fur trading firm Hudson's Bay Company.

He spent three spells on the Legislative and Executive Councils of Hong Kong between 1868 and 1887. He was further listed as a director of the HongKong, Canton & Macao Steamboat Company in 1876. Whilst in the colony, William also served as consul-general for the Kingdom of Hawaii, for which he was made a Knight Commander of the Hawaiian Order of Kalakao (named in honour of Kalākaua, the country's last king). He also acted as consul for the Kingdom of Denmark in Hong Kong.

In 1888, Keswick and the chemist Herbert W. C. Tweddle bought the Negritos oil fields on the La Brea y Pariñas hacienda in Peru. Keswick and Tweddle then formed the London and Pacific Petroleum Company to profit from the property.

After serving as High Sheriff of Surrey for 1897 he was elected Member of Parliament for Epsom at a by-election in 1899, and held the seat until his resignation on 8 March 1912 by the procedural device of accepting the post of Steward of the Manor of Northstead.

William died the day after this resignation at his home, Eastwood Park, Great Bookham, Surrey, on 9 March 1912 aged 77. William had lived in the house since 1882 and on his death, it passed to his son (and only surviving child) Henry.

== Family ==
Keswick married first Amelia Sophia Dubeux (d. 1883) and had two sons:

- Henry Keswick (1870–1928)
- Lieutenant David Johnstone Keswick (1876–1900), an officer in the 12th Lancers who was killed in South Africa during the Second Boer War.

His grandson, William Johnston Keswick "Tony" (1903–90) was Jardine's Tai-pan between 1934 and 1941 and later Governor of the Hudson's Bay Company

Legislative Council of Hong Kong
| Preceded by James Whittall | Unofficial Member; 1867–1872 | Succeeded by James Whittall |
| Preceded by James Whittall | Unofficial Member; 1875–1887 | Succeeded by Francis Bulkeley Johnson |
Business positions
| Preceded by William H. Forbes | Chairman of the Hongkong and Shanghai Banking Corporation; 1880–1881 | Succeeded by A. McIver |
Parliament of the United Kingdom
| Preceded by Thomas Townsend Bucknill | Member of Parliament for Epsom; 1899–1912 | Succeeded by Henry Keswick |
Honorary titles
| Preceded by Sir Edward Carbutt, 1st Baronet | High Sheriff of Surrey; 1897–1898 | Succeeded by Lawrence James Baker |
