= Percy Weatherall =

British businessman

Edward Percy Keswick Weatherall (born 1957) is a British businessman, formerly active in Hong Kong. He was managing director of the Jardine Matheson Group from 2000 to 31 March 2006, having joined the board in 1999.

Weatherall joined the Jardine Group in 1976 and worked in a number of senior executive positions in Hong Kong, the US, the UK, Saudi Arabia, Korea and the Philippines, prior to becoming "Tai-Pan". Weatherall was chief executive officer of Hongkong Land.

Weatherall is a member of the Keswick family, which control Jardine Matheson through complex cross-shareholdings, despite holding only around 10% of the shares in the company. During Weatherall's period in charge, the company defended itself against Brandes Investment Partners who proposed the company break itself up to release extra shareholder value, and Jardines undertook large scale strategic investment in Astra International of Indonesia via the Singapore company Jardine Cycle & Carriage. He was succeeded as group managing director by Anthony Nightingale on 1 April 2006.

== Family ==
Weatherall was born the elder son of Captain Anthony Weatherall and Sophy Keswick.

He is married to Clara Mary Johnston (b. 1960), elder daughter of Nicholas John Johnston by his wife Susanna Maria Chancellor, younger daughter of Sir Christopher Chancellor CMG They have four children: Bertram, Stella, Ruby and Honor Weatherall. The family lives in South West Scotland, having left Hong Kong in April 2006.

Weatherall has two sisters and a younger brother (who is married to his wife's younger sister). Weatherall's elder sister Catherine Nony was married to Nicholas Soames as his first wife. His younger sister Isobel Charlotte, Countess of Strathmore and Kinghorne (b. ca. 1963) was married from 1984 to 2005 to the 18th Earl of Strathmore and Kinghorne, and is mother of the earl's three elder surviving sons.
