= Tony Keswick =

British businessman and Army general

Sir William Johnston Keswick ((/ˈkɛzɪk/); 6 December 1903 – 16 February 1990), known as Tony Keswick, was a third generation member of the Scottish business dynasty, the Keswick family, associated with the conglomerate of Jardine Matheson. He served as Chairman of the Shanghai Municipal Council before the outbreak of the Pacific War, and survived a murder attempt by the Japanese in 1941. During the Pacific War, he served as head of the China Theatre of the Special Operations Executive, Britain's wartime secret service. After the war, he served as Governor of the Hudson's Bay Company, among other positions.

== Life and career ==
"Tony" Keswick was born in Yokohama, Japan, the son of Henry Keswick and his wife, Ida. He returned to Britain as a boy to attend Winchester School and Trinity College, Cambridge. He arrived in the Far East in 1926. Keswick and his brother remained directors of the firm after they had left the Far East. He was in charge of the Shanghai office (at that time, the Head Office in the Far East) from 1935 until 1941. He was also Chairman of the Shanghai Municipal Council during the crises leading to the Pacific War, stepping down in May 1941 to be replaced by John Hellyer Liddell.

== World War II and the Shanghai Racecourse incident ==
On 23 January 1941, at a meeting of 3,000 rate-payers on the Shanghai Racecourse, Keswick was shot twice by Yukichi Hayashi, chairman of the Japanese Street Union Association. The shooting occurred after the meeting rejected an amendment proposed by Hayashi, which opposed the imposition of higher taxes and instead recommended acceptance of a loan from an unnamed Japanese bank. Keswick's wounds, one to the left side of his chest and the other to his left forearm, were not considered serious, with doctors commenting that his heavy coat had probably saved his life. Hayashi was subsequently arrested. The company's Chinese business interests were later looted by occupying Japanese forces.

Early on in the war, Keswick was appointed chief of the British Special Operations Executive (SOE) based in London. Prior to the Japanese attack on Pearl Harbor, Keswick flew to Singapore with Duff Cooper, Resident Cabinet Minister for the colony, and returned part way home carrying a report for Prime Minister Winston Churchill.

After joining the British Army, he saw service in the Middle East before returning to participate in the Normandy Landings as part of 21st Army Group with responsibility for currency management. By the end of the war, he had risen to the rank of Brigadier.

== Post-war ==
After the war, he took over as managing director of Matheson & Co. Ltd, in London, Jardine, Matheson & Co.'s London correspondent. From 1952 to 1965, he was Governor (Company Chairman) of the Hudson's Bay Company, North America's oldest company (established by English royal charter in 1670). Among his other business activities, he was Director of the Bank of England, Vice-Chairman of Alliance Assurance, and Director of the Anglo-Persian Oil Company, later British Petroleum. He was knighted in the 1972 Birthday Honours.

He was a friend of the sculptor Henry Moore and placed several statues in what became the Glenkiln Sculpture Park at scenic spots on the hillsides of the Keswick estate. Keswick was a member of the Royal Company of Archers, the British monarch's personal bodyguard in Scotland.

== See also ==
- Henry Keswick (businessman), son of Tony
