= Shanghai International Settlement =

Merged conceded territories (1863–1941)

- International Settlement
- 1863–1941/1943
- Flag of the Shanghai Municipality before World War I Seal of the Shanghai Municipality before World War I

- 1846 Establishment of the British Settlement 1848 Expansion of the British Settlement 1848–1863 Establishment of the American Settlement 1863–1943 British and American merger into the International Settlement, expanding until 1943
- Demonym: Shanghailander; Shanghainese
- Area
  - 1925: 22.59 km^{2} (8.72 sq mi)
- Population
  - 1910: 501,561
  - 1925: 1,137,298
- Government
  - Motto: Omnia Juncta in Uno (Latin) "All Joined into One"
- History
  - Established: 1863
  - Disestablished: 1941/1943
| Preceded by | Succeeded by |
| British Concession; American Concession | Reorganized National Government of the Republic of China |
- Today part of: China: Shanghai; Huangpu district; Jing'an district; Hongkou district; Yangpu district

Shanghai International Settlement
- Chinese: 上海公共租界
- Literal meaning: Shanghai communal concession territories
Transcriptions
Standard Mandarin
- Hanyu Pinyin: Shànghǎi Gōnggòng Zūjiè
- Wade–Giles: Shang-hai Kung-kung Tsu-chieh

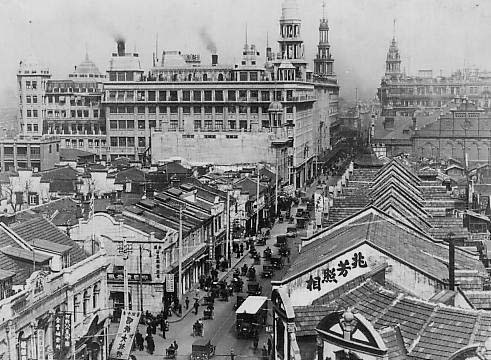
Nanking Road

1875/1884 map of Shanghai with foreign concessions: the British Concession in blue, the French Concession to the south in faded red and American Concession to the north in faded orange; Chinese part of the city in faded yellow (the largest area).

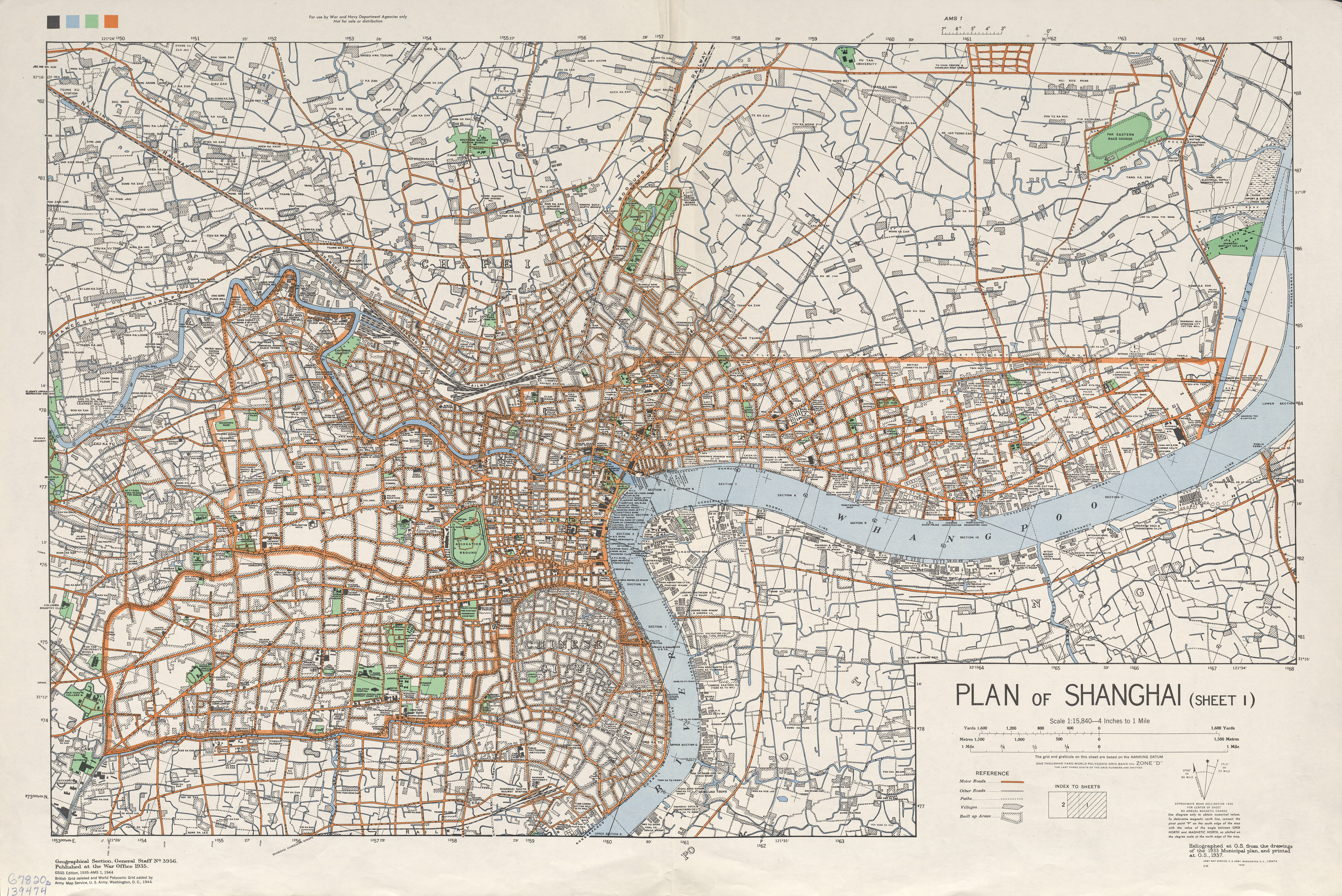
1935 map of Shanghai showing the International Settlement with its boundary marked "settlement boundary", as well as the French Concession with an unlabelled boundary also marked.

The Shanghai International Settlement originated from the 1863 merger of the British and American concessions in Shanghai, in which British and American citizens would enjoy extraterritoriality and consular jurisdiction under the terms of unequal treaties agreed by both parties. These treaties were abrogated in 1943.

The British settlements were established following the victory of the British in the First Opium War (1839–1842). Under the terms of the Treaty of Nanking, the five treaty ports including Shanghai were opened to foreign merchants, overturning the monopoly then held by the southern port of Canton (Guangzhou) under the Canton System. The British also established a base on Hong Kong. American and French involvement followed closely on the heels of the British, and their enclaves were established north and south, respectively, of the British area.

Unlike the colonies of Hong Kong and Macau, where the United Kingdom and Portugal enjoyed full sovereignty in perpetuity, the foreign concessions in China remained under Chinese sovereignty. In 1854, the three countries created the Shanghai Municipal Council (SMC) to serve all their interests, but, in 1862, the French concession dropped out of the arrangement. The following year, the British and American settlements formally united to create the Shanghai International Settlement.

As more foreign powers entered into treaty relations with China, their nationals also became part of the administration of the settlement. The number of treaty powers had climbed to a high of 19 by 1918 but was down to 14 by the 1930s: the United Kingdom, the United States, Japan, France, Italy, the Sweden Norwegian Union, Denmark, the Netherlands, Spain, Portugal, Peru, Mexico, and Switzerland. Nonetheless, the SMC remained a predominantly British affair, until the growth of Japan's involvement in the late 1930s. The international character of the Settlement was reflected in the flag and seal of the Municipal Council, which featured the flags of several countries. (Note: Austria-Hungary, Denmark, France, Italy, the Netherlands, Norway-Sweden, Portugal, Prussia (representing the German Empire), Russia, Spain (represented by its civil ensign), the United Kingdom, and the United States. After World War I, the Prussian flag was replaced by a blank space; this was the only change done to the flag of the SMC, despite other geopolitical changes which affected the displayed flags (such as the dissolution of Austria-Hungary, the adoption of new republican flags by Portugal and (briefly) Spain, the Bolshevik Revolution, and the Dissolution of the union between Norway and Sweden).)

During the 1920s and 1930s, the Shanghai International Settlement covered approximately around 4% of Shanghai's total administrative area at the time, and around 20%-25% of Shanghai's core urban area.

The international settlement came to an abrupt end in December 1941, when Japanese troops stormed in immediately following the Japanese attack on Pearl Harbor. In early 1943, new treaties signed formally ended the extraterritorial privileges of Americans and Britons, although its terms were not met until the recovery of Shanghai following Japan's 1945 surrender. The French later surrendered their privileges in a separate agreement in February 1946.

It was one of two Chinese international settlements, along with Gulangyu International Settlement.

== History ==
After the British victory in the First Opium War, foreign powers including France obtained concessions in China through the unequal treaties.

=== Arrival of foreigners and establishment of settlements ===
The Treaty of Nanking and its supplementary treaty of 1843 – the first of the unequal treaties – provided British merchants with the right to reside with their families and rent grounds and houses in five ports (Guanzhou, Xiamen, Fuzhou, Shanghai, and Ningbo), but there was no mention of separate residential areas for foreigners on Chinese soil. However, the imperial commissioner who negotiated the supplementary treaty reported to the Qing emperor that, by signing the treaty, he had successfully arranged that in the treaty ports, "the boundaries of an area should be designated which foreigners are not allowed to exceed" (yiding jiezhi, buxu yuyue); that intent was not clearly stated in the English-language version of the treaty. The Qing rulers, by intending to confine the "barbarians" to an officially designated special zone, apparently hoped to resurrect the old Canton system: that is, a system that strictly confined foreigners to a segregated zone.

At Shanghai, the intention of the imperial officials had clearly been initially to keep the foreigners out, and upon his arrival in 1843, the first British consul, Captain George Balfour, could not find a house for the consulate. The British finally decided to locate themselves in the northern suburbs and asked the Daotai, Gong Muiju, to designate an area there as a segregated British area. This coincided with the Daotai's intentions, since two violent incidents between local Chinese and foreigners had prompted him to take steps to limit contacts between Chinese and foreigners. This was formalized in 1845 with the delimitation of a segregated area north of Yangjingbang: a creek that ran north of the Chinese city.

Later that year, Gong Muiju and Balfour concluded an agreement called the Land Regulations (Shanghai zudi zhangcheng), which set forth the institutional basis for the British settlement. In 1848, with the permission of the Daotai, the 138-acre British settlement – a fraction of the 5,584 acres the International Settlement was to cover by 1899 – was slightly expanded westward and northward.

Following the British example, the French consul Charles de Montigny and the Daotai Lin’gui agreed in 1849 that a French settlement be established on a strip of land between the Chinese city and the British settlement. The American consul was somewhat offended by the fact that the British and the French had secured the best plots of land in the area, and after lengthy deliberations, the Americans – who with the Treaty of Wanghia of 1844 had gained the same rights as those enjoyed by the British in the five treaty ports – established their own settlement northeast of Shanghai. In 1852, the total population of the settlements was about 500, including 265 foreigners.

Flag after 1914 with a blank spot where the Prussian flag was.

Towards the end of the 19th century, Shanghai Russians also arrived, with Russia's construction of the Chinese Eastern Railway and acquisition of Harbin and Port Arthur.

=== Municipal Council ===
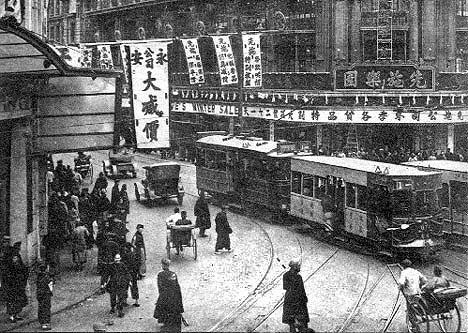
Shanghai tram, 1920s.

On 11 July 1854, a committee of Western businessmen met and held the first annual meeting of the Shanghai Municipal Council (SMC, formally the Council for the Foreign Settlement North of the Yang-king-pang), ignoring protests of consular officials, and laid down the Land Regulations which established the principles of self-government. The aims of this first Council were simply to assist in the formation of roads, refuse collection, and taxation across the disparate Concessions.

In 1863, the American concession – land fronting the Huangpu River to the north-east of Soochow Creek (Suzhou Creek) – officially joined the British Settlement (stretching from Yang-ching-pang Creek to Suzhou Creek) to become the Shanghai International Settlement. The French concession remained independent, and the Chinese retained control over the original walled city and the area surrounding the foreign enclaves. This would later result in sometimes absurd administrative outcomes, such as needing three drivers' licenses to travel through the complete city.

By the late-1860s, Shanghai's official governing body had been practically transferred from the individual concessions to the Shanghai Municipal Council (工部局, literally 'Works Department', from the standard English local government title of 'Board of works'). The British consul was the de jure authority in the Settlement, but he had no actual power unless the ratepayers (who voted for the council) agreed. Instead, he and the other consulates deferred to the council.

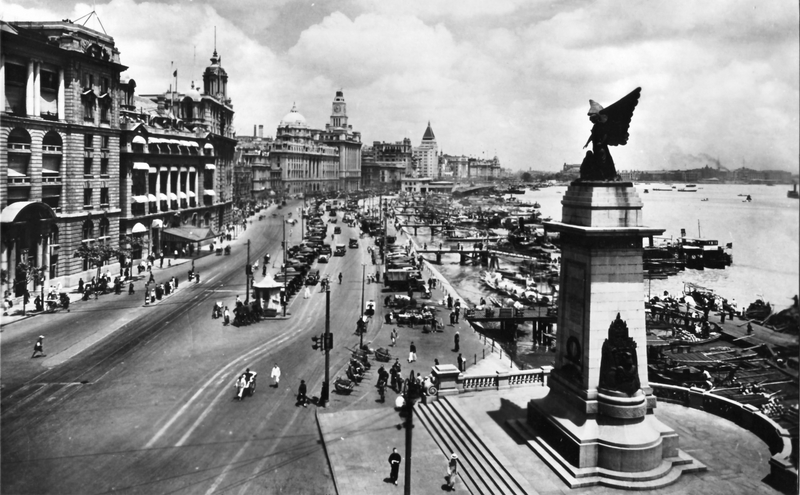
The Bund with the Allied War Memorial in the foreground, 1928.

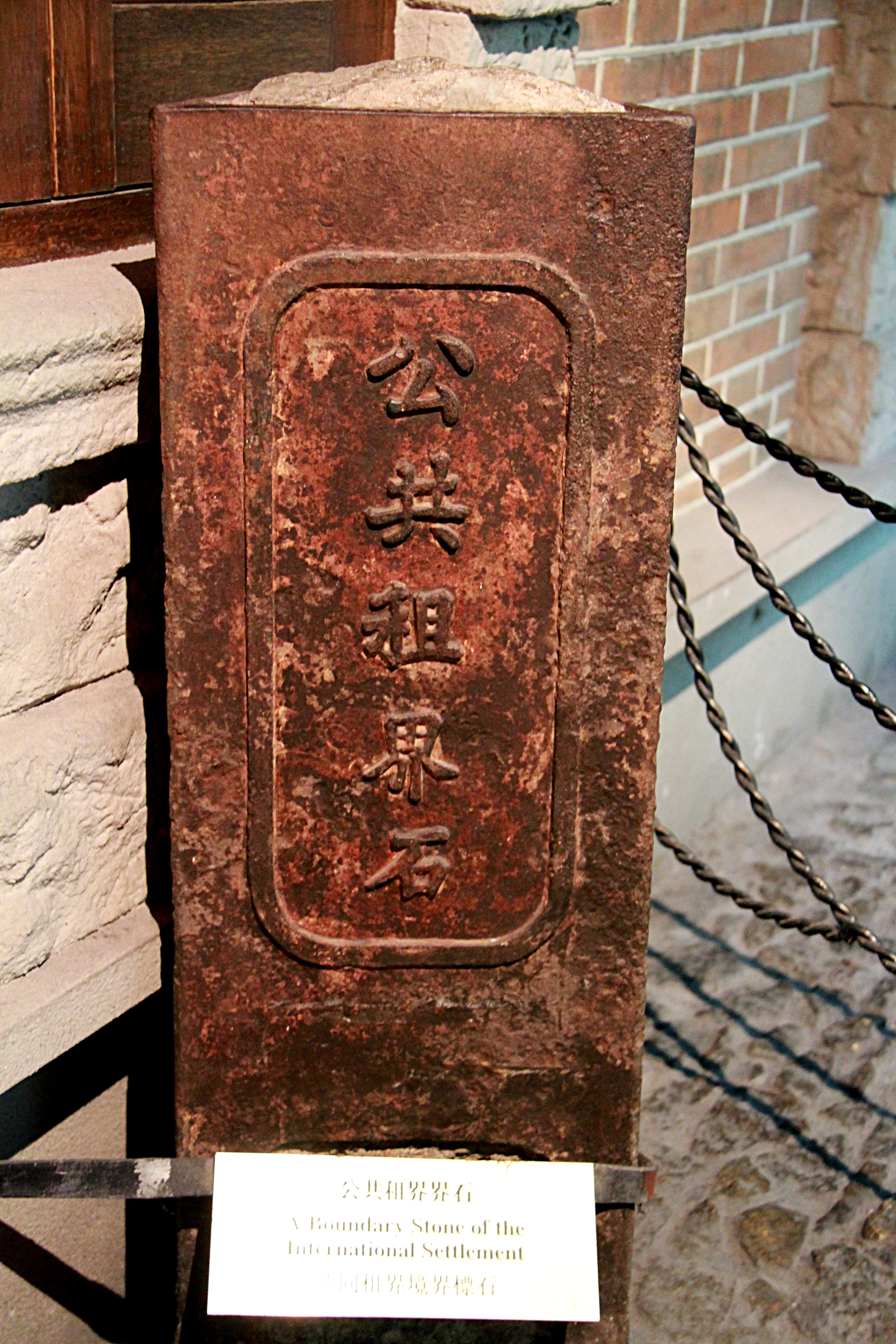
Boundary Stone of the Shanghai International Settlement.

The council had become a practical monopoly over the city's businesses by the mid-1880s. It bought all the local gas-suppliers, electricity producers and water-companies, then – during the 20th-century – took control over all non-private rickshaws and the Settlement tramways. It also regulated opium sales and prostitution until their banning in 1918 and 1920, respectively.

Until the late-1920s, therefore, the SMC and its subsidiaries, including the police, power station, and public works, were British dominated (though not directly controlled by Britain, which had no authority over the council). Some of what happened in the Settlement during this period, such as the May Thirtieth Movement – a series of anti-imperialist protests which began after the Shanghai Municipal Police opened fire on Chinese demonstrators – weakened the British Empire's position in China.

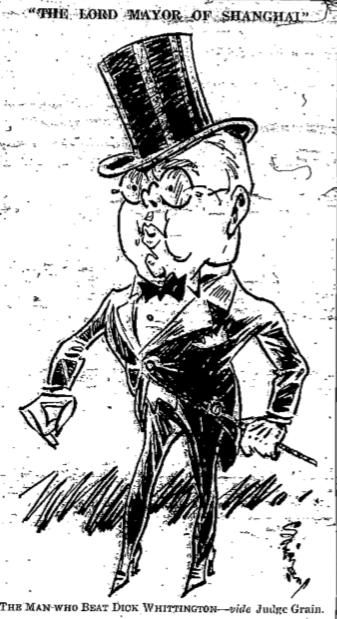
A caricature of Stirling Fessenden, one of the longest serving chairmen of the SMC, as the "Lord Mayor of Shanghai"

No Chinese people residing in the International Settlement were permitted to join the council until 1928. Amongst the many members who served on the council, its chairman during the 1920s, Stirling Fessenden, is possibly the most notable. An American, he served as the settlement's main administrator during Shanghai's most turbulent era and was considered more "British" than the council's British members. He oversaw many of the major incidents of the decade, including the May Thirtieth Movement and the White Terror that came with the Shanghai massacre in 1927.

By the early 1930s, the British and the Chinese each had five members on the council, the Japanese two and the Americans and others two. At the 1936 Council election, because of their increasing interests in the Settlement, the Japanese nominated three candidates. Only two were elected, which led to a Japanese protest after 323 uncounted votes were discovered. As a result, the election was declared invalid and a new poll held on April 20–21, 1936, at which the Japanese nominated only two candidates. In the case of the Chinese members, in 1926 the Ratepayers' Meeting adopted a resolution approving the addition of three Chinese members to the council, and they took their seats for the first time in April, 1928: in May 1930, their number was increased to five.

The International Settlement was wholly foreign-controlled, with staff of all nationalities, including British, Americans, Danes, Dutch, French, Spanish, Portuguese, Italians, and Germans. In reality, the British held the largest number of seats on the council and headed all the Municipal departments (British included Australians, New Zealanders, Canadians, Dominion of Newfoundlanders, and South Africans whose extraterritorial rights were established by the United Kingdom treaty). The only department not chaired by a Briton was the Municipal Orchestra, which was controlled by an Italian.

The Settlement maintained its own fire-service, police force (the Shanghai Municipal Police), and even possessed its own military reserve in the Shanghai Volunteer Corps (萬國商團). Following some disturbances at the British concession in Hankow in 1927, the defences at Shanghai were augmented by a permanent battalion of the British Army, which was referred to as the Shanghai Defence Force (SDF or SHAF), and a contingent of US Marines. Other armed forces would arrive in Shanghai: the French Concession had a defensive force of Troupes de marine and Annamite troops from French Indochina, the Italians also introduced their own marines, as did the Japanese (whose troops eventually outnumbered the other countries' many times over).

=== Extra-settlement roads ===
From the 1860s, the Municipal Council began building roads beyond the concession boundaries, ostensibly to connect the concession with other properties or facilities which required the protection of Britain and other treaty powers during the unrest of the Taiping Rebellion. The Municipal Council obtained limited administrative powers over the areas adjacent to these "extra-settlement roads", making the area a "quasi-concession". The expansion of the International Settlement in 1899 took in most of the extra-settlement roads area, but from 1901, the Municipal Council began building further roads beyond the new boundary with a view to expanding the concession to cover those areas as well.

However, a request to further expand the concession (inspired by a similar expansion of the French concession in 1914) was turned down by the Chinese government due to anti-imperialist sentiments. Britain, pre-occupied with World War I, did not press the issue, and the extra-settlement roads area retained the "quasi-concession" status until the demise of the concession. Parts of the northern extra-settlement roads area was allocated to Japan for defence purposes in 1927, which the Japanese used as a base for military operations during the 1932 January 28th Incident and the 1937 Battle of Shanghai. After that battle, Japan took full control over the northern extra-settlement roads area and expelled International Settlement police. The neutrality of the western extra-settlement roads area survived in some form until the withdrawal of British troops in 1940.

=== Legal status of the International Settlement ===
Article 28 of the International Settlement's Land Regulations stated unequivocally that, "the land encompassed in the territory remains Chinese territory, subject to China's sovereign rights." As expressed by legal experts:

...the self-governing International Settlement possesses no more power than the mere delegation of purely local and municipal powers and functions. Control of police, sanitation, roads, and other problems of local administration are granted to the Municipal Council simply because that body happens to be the one best equipped to deal with these matters in an area where the large majority of foreigners dwell. But the Municipal Council is in no sense a political body. Its powers, being delegated and hence limited, are subject to strict construction. What foreigners acquire is simply the delegated power of municipal administration, while the reserve powers remain in the sovereign grantor, the Chinese Government. Although under the control of the Consular Council, the area is still Chinese territory, over which China's sovereignty remains unsurrendered.

=== Rise of Imperial Japan (20th century) ===
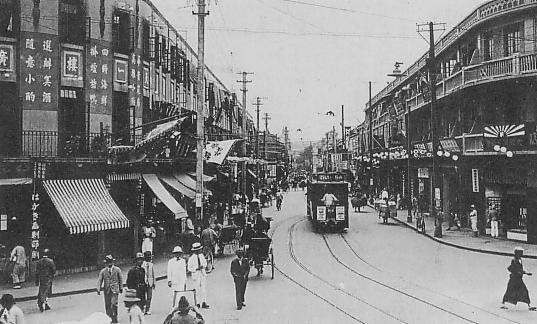
Hongkew Japantown

In the 19th century, Europeans possessed treaty ports in Japan in the same way they held those in China. However, Japan rapidly developed into a modern nation, and by the turn of the 20th century, the Japanese had successfully negotiated with all powers to abrogate all unequal treaties with it. Japan stood alongside the European powers as part of the Eight-Nation Alliance during the infamous fifty-five day siege of the foreign embassy compound in Peking. Japan entered the 20th century as a rising world power, and with its unequal treaties with the European powers now abrogated, it joined in, obtaining an unequal treaty with China granting extraterritorial rights under the Treaty of Shimonoseki signed in 1895.

In 1915, during the First World War, Japan overtook Britain as the country with the largest number of foreign residents in Shanghai. In 1914, Japan sided with Britain and France in the war and conquered all German possessions in China. By the beginning of the 1930s, Japan was swiftly becoming the most powerful national group in Shanghai and accounted for some 80% of all extraterritorial foreigners in China. Much of Hongkew, which had become an unofficial Japanese settlement, was known as Little Tokyo.

In 1931, supposed "protection of Japanese colonists from Chinese aggression" in Hongkew was used as a pretext for the Shanghai Incident, when Japanese troops invaded Shanghai. From then until the Second Sino-Japanese War (1937–1945), Hongkew was almost entirely outside of the SMC's hands, with law and protection enforced to varying degrees by the Japanese Consular Police and Japanese members of the Shanghai Municipal Police.

==== Japanese takeover of Shanghai (1937) ====
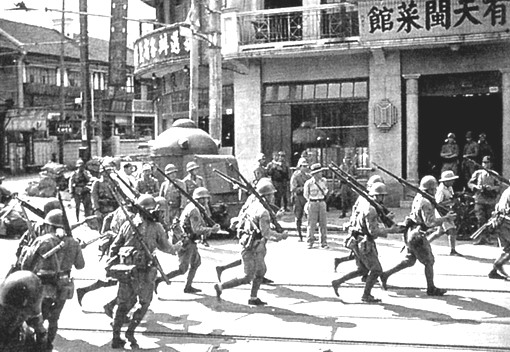
Japanese soldiers in Shanghai, 1937.

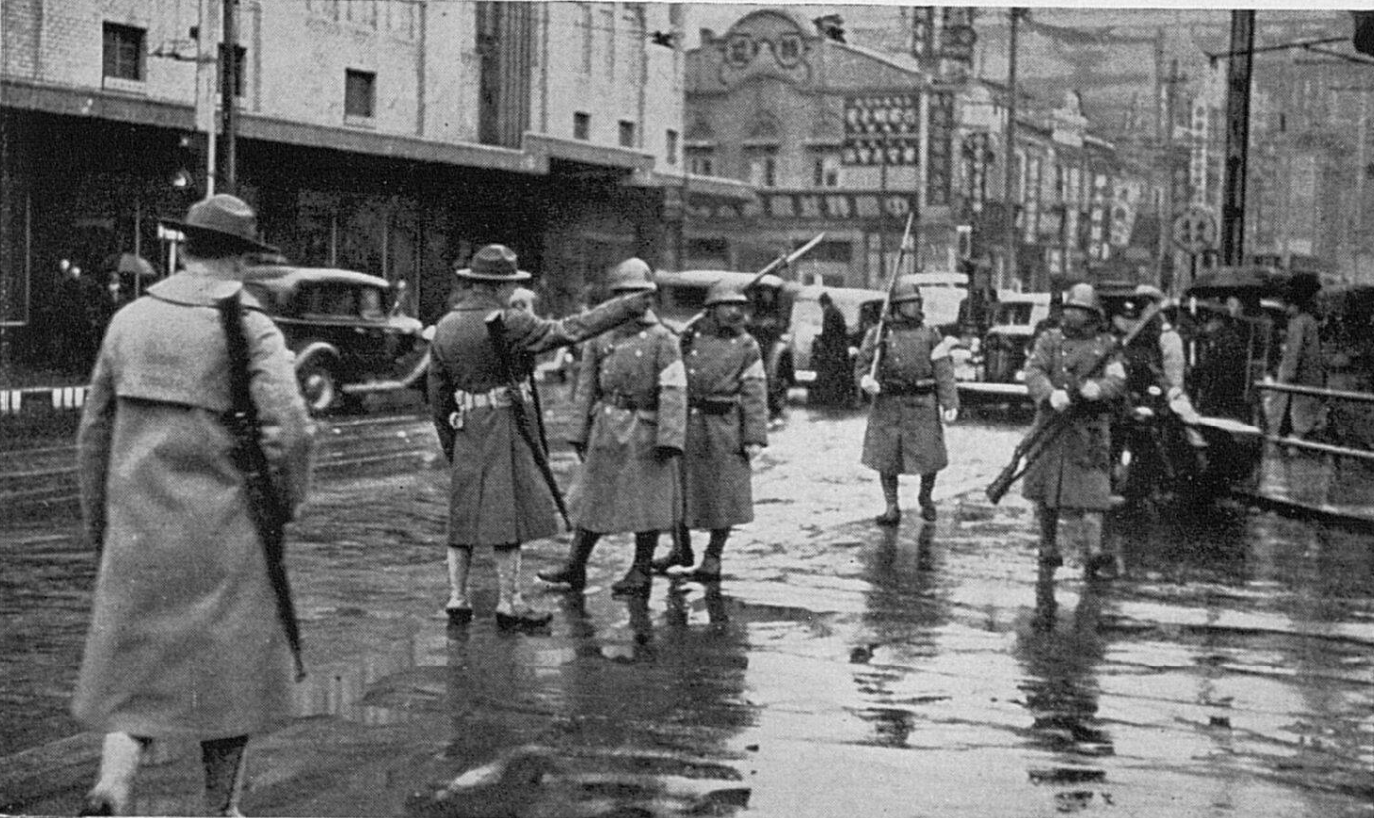
American marines holding up a Japanese patrol trying to enter the International Settlement, Shanghai, 1938

In 1932, there were 1,040,780 Chinese people living within the International Settlement, with another 400,000 fleeing into the area after the Second Sino-Japanese War broke out in 1937. For the next five years, the International Settlement and the French Concession were surrounded by Japanese occupiers and Chinese revolutionaries, with conflict often spilling into the Settlement's borders. In 1941, the Japanese launched an abortive political bid to take over the SMC: during a mass meeting of ratepayers at the Settlement Race Grounds, a Japanese official leaped up and shot William Keswick, then chairman of the council. While Keswick was only wounded, a near riot broke out.

==== Evacuation of British garrison ====
Britain evacuated its garrisons from mainland Chinese cities, particularly Shanghai, in August 1940.

==== Japanese occupy the International Settlement (1941) ====
Anglo-American influence effectively ended after 8 December 1941, when the Imperial Japanese Army entered and occupied the British and American controlled parts of the city in the wake of the attack on Pearl Harbor. The British and American troops, taken by surprise, surrendered without a shot, with the exception of the only British riverboat in Shanghai, HMS Peterel, which refused to surrender: six of the 18 British crew on board at the time were killed when the ship was sunk after the Japanese opened fire at almost point-blank range. The French troops did not move from the preserved French Concession, as the French Vichy government considered itself neutral.

European residents of the International Settlement were forced to wear armbands to differentiate them, were evicted from their homes, and – just like Chinese citizens – were liable to maltreatment. All were liable for punitive punishments, torture, and even death during the period of Japanese occupation. The Japanese sent European and American citizens to be interned at the Lunghua Civilian Assembly Center, a work camp on what was then the outskirts of Shanghai. Survivors of Lunghua were released in August 1945.

Shanghai was notable for a long period as the only place in the world that unconditionally offered refuge for Jews escaping from the Nazis. These refugees often lived in squalid conditions in an area known as the Shanghai Ghetto in Hongkew. On 21 August 1941, the Japanese government closed Hongkew to Jewish immigration.

=== Return to Chinese rule ===
In February 1943, the International Settlement was de jure returned to the Chinese as part of the British–Chinese Treaty for the Relinquishment of Extra-Territorial Rights in China and American–Chinese Treaty for Relinquishment of Extraterritorial Rights in China with the Nationalist Government of the Republic of China under Chiang Kai-shek. However, because Shanghai was under Japanese control, this was unenforceable. In reply, in July 1943, the Japanese retroceded the SMC to the City Government of Shanghai, which was then in the hands of the pro-Japanese Wang Jingwei Government.

After the war and the liberation of the city from the Japanese, a Liquidation Commission fitfully met to discuss the remaining details of the handover. By the end of 1945, most Westerners not actively involved in the Chinese Civil War (such as intelligence agents, soldiers, journalists, etc.) or in Shanghai's remaining foreign businesses, had left the city. With the defeat of the Kuomintang in 1949, the city was occupied by the Communist People's Liberation Army and came under the control of the mayor of Shanghai.

The foreign architecture of the International Settlement era can still be seen today along the Bund and in many locations around the city.

== Currency ==
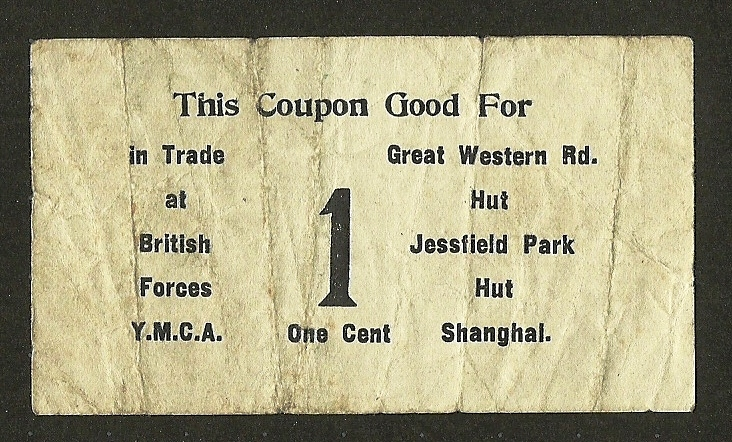
Currency issued inside the settlement for use by the British Armed Forces inside the city (c. 1940)

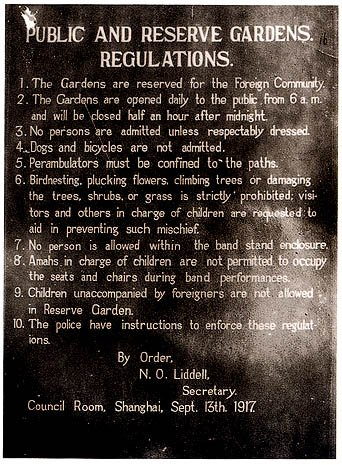
"The Gardens (Huangpu Park) are reserved for the Foreign Community".

The currency situation in China was very complicated in the 19th century, as there was no unified monetary system. Different parts of China operated different systems, and the Spanish pieces of eight that had been coming from Mexico for a few hundred years on Manila galleons were current along the China coast. Until the 1840s, these silver dollar coins were Spanish coins minted mainly in Mexico City: but from the 1840s, these gave way to Mexican republican dollars.

In Shanghai, this complexity represented a microcosm of the complicated economy existing elsewhere along the China coast. The Chinese reckoned in weights of silver, which did not necessarily correspond to circulating coins. One important unit was a tael, a measurement of weight with several different definitions. These included customs taels (for foreign trade) and cotton taels (for cotton trade), among others. Shanghai had its own tael, which was very similar in weight to the customs tael and, therefore, popular for international business. China also had a mixture of coins, including Chinese copper cash coins and Mexican dollars. Paper money was first issued by European and North American colonial banks (one British colonial bank, known as the Chartered Bank of India, Australia, and China, at one time issued banknotes in Shanghai that were denominated in Mexican dollars).

Yen was used in the Japanese district of "Little Tokyo". European and North American currencies did not officially circulate in the International Settlement. Until the year 1873, however, US dollar coins would have reasonably corresponded in size, shape, and value to Mexican dollars. Between 1873 and 1900, all silver standard dollars had depreciated to about 50% of the value of the gold standard dollars of the United States and Canada, leading to a rising economic depression.

The Chinese themselves officially adopted the dollar unit as their national currency in 1889, and the first Chinese dollar coins, known as yuan, contained an inscription which related their value to an already existing Chinese system of accounts. On the earliest Chinese dollar (yuan) coins, it states the words 7 mace and 2 candareens; the mace and candareen were sub-divisions of the tael unit of weight. Banknotes tended to be issued in dollars, either worded as such or as yuan.

Despite the complications arising from a mixture of Chinese and Spanish coinages, there was one overwhelming unifying factor binding all the systems in use: silver. The Chinese reckoned purely in terms of silver, and value was always compared against a weight of silver (hence, the reason large prices were given in tael). It was the strict adherence of the Chinese to silver that caused China, and even the British colonies of Hong Kong and Weihaiwei, to remain on the silver standard after the rest of the world had changed over to the gold standard. When China began producing official Republican yuan coins in 1934, they were minted in Shanghai and shipped to Nanking for distribution.

== Postal services ==
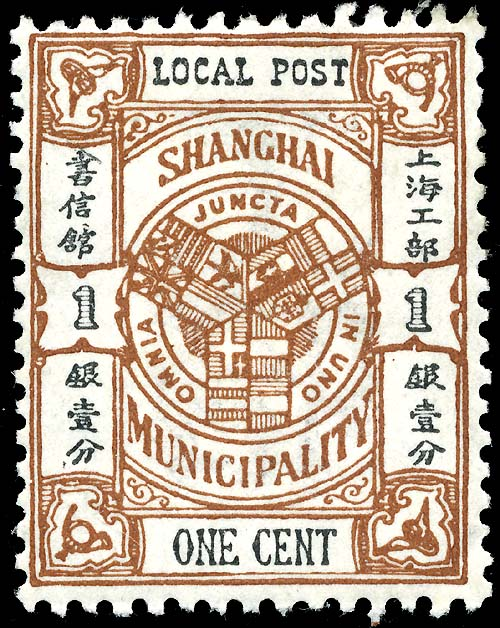
Shanghai local post stamp showing the seal of the Municipal Council

Shanghai had developed a postal service as early as the Ming dynasty, but during the treaty port era, foreign postal services were organised through their respective consulates. For example, the United States Post Office Department maintained a United States Postal Agency at the Shanghai consulate through which Americans could use the US Post Office to send mail to and from the US mainland and US territories. Starting in 1919, the 16 current regular US stamps were overprinted for use in Shanghai with the city's name, "China", and amounts double their printed face values. In 1922, texts for two of the overprints were changed, thereby completing the Scott catalogue set of K1-18, "Offices in China".

The British originally used British postage stamps overprinted with the local currency amount, but from 1868, the British changed to Hong Kong postage stamps already denominated in dollars. However, in the special case of Shanghai, in the year 1865 the International Settlement began to issue its own postage stamps, denominated in the local Shanghai tael unit.

The Shanghai Post Office controlled all post within the Settlement, but post entering or leaving the treaty port was required to go through the Chinese Imperial Post Office. In 1922, the various foreign postal services, the Shanghai Post Office, and the Chinese Post Office were all brought together into a single Chinese Post Office, thus extending the 1914 membership of the Chinese Post Office to the Universal Postal Union to the Shanghai Post Office. Some other foreign countries refused to fall under this new postal service's remit, however; for many years, Japan notably sent almost all its mail to Shanghai in diplomatic bags, which could not be opened by postal staff.

The General Shanghai Post Office was first located on Beijing Road and moved to the location on Sichuan North Road of the General Post Office Building that is today the Shanghai Post Museum.

== Music ==
International merchants brought with them amateur musical talent that manifested in the creation of the Shanghai Philharmonic Society in 1868. From here, the Shanghai Municipal Orchestra was officially formed in 1879.

In 1938, the Shanghai Municipal Orchestra faced disbandment as the ratepayers in the annual Municipal Council meeting considered reallocating budgets away from the orchestra, since it was "western and unnecessary". However, after much discussion, they decided to keep the orchestra, acknowledging that its educational value was much greater than the cost of keeping it up. The Shanghai Municipal Orchestra had the financial and verbal backing of many other larger countries, including Italy, who donated 50,000 lire to the orchestra, the France Council, who acted as a defending argument for the maintenance of the orchestra, and Japan, whose Viscount Hidemaro Konoye encouraged the Japanese people to support the orchestra and the culture that it brought to the East.

In addition to the string orchestra, opera and choral music were favored forms of entertainment. Often, the orchestra would accompany singers as a part of orchestra concerts, in addition to the symphonies and other pieces they played, or just in choral or opera concerts.

== Government ==
=== Shanghai Municipal Council ===
Members of the Shanghai Municipal Council were elected by residents who were foreigners and ratepayers who were a minority in the Settlement. The criteria for running for office was higher than voting, with around 3% of the population being eligible to run with property requirements along with being a foreign taxpaying resident. Seats on the council were given unofficially to certain nationalities.

==== List of chairmen of the Shanghai Municipal Council ====
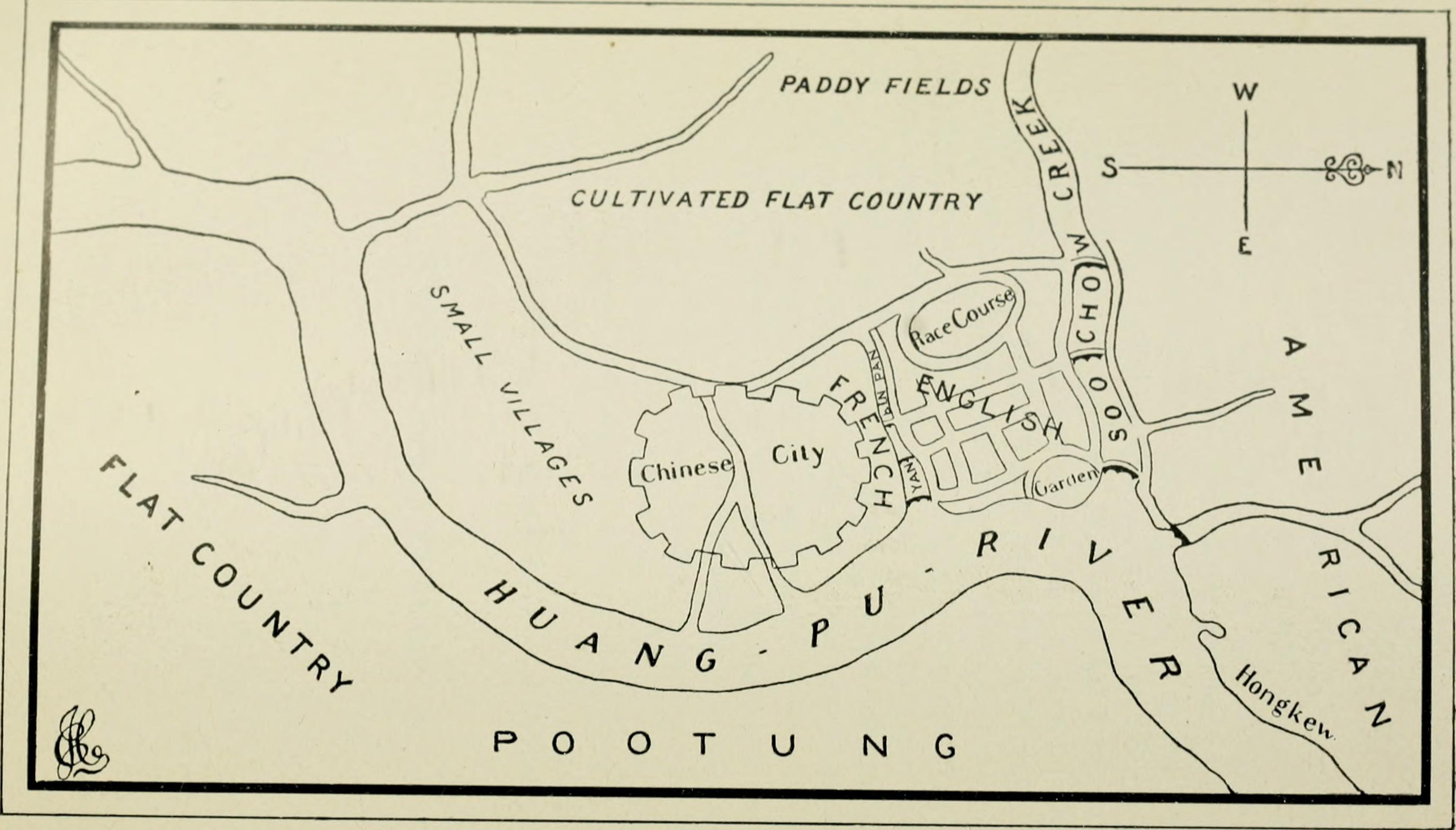
Simplified map of Shanghai Settlement (west on top)

1. Edward Cunningham (25.5.1852 – 21.7.1853, as Chairman of the Committee on Roads and Jetties, the Municipal Council's predecessor)
2. William Shepard Wetmore (21.7.1853 – 11.7.1854, as Chairman of the Committee on Roads and Jetties)
3. James Lawrence Man (11.7.1854 – 1855)
4. Christopher Augustus Fearon (1855)
5. William Shepard Wetmore (3.1855 – 1855, second time)
6. William Thorbun (1855–1856)
7. James Lawrence Man (1.1856 – 31.1.1857)
8. George Watson Coutts (31.1.1857 – 1.1858)
9. John Thorne (1.1858 – 1.1859)
10. Robert Reid (31.1.1859 – 15.2.1860)
11. Rowland Hamilton (15.2.1860 – 2.2.1861)
12. William Howard (2.2.1861 – 31.3.1862)
13. Henry Turner (31.3.1862 – 4.4.1863)
14. Henry William Dent (4.4.1863 – 25.4.1865)
15. William Keswick (25.4.1865 – 18.4.1866)
16. F.B. Johnson (18.4.1866 – 3.1868)
17. Edward Cunningham (3.1868 – 2.4.1870, second time)
18. George Basil Dixwell (2.4.1870 – 4.4.1871)
19. John Dent (4.4.1871 – 1.1873)
20. Robert Inglis Fearon (1.1873 – 16.4.1874)
21. John Graeme Purdon (16.4.1874 – 1876)
22. Alfred Adolphus Krauss (1876 – 1.1877)
23. J. Hart (1.1877 – 16.1.1879)
24. Robert "Bob" W. Little (16.1.1879 – 30.1.1882)
25. H.R. Hearn (30.1.1882 – 1882)
26. Walter Cyril Ward (1882–1883)
27. Alexander Myburgh (1883 – 22.1.1884)
28. James Johnstone Keswick (22.1.1884 – 22.1.1886)
29. A.G. Wood (22.1.1886 – 1889)
30. John Macgregor (1889 – 5.1891)
31. John Graeme Purdon (5.1891 – 1.1893, second time)
32. John Macgregor (1.1893 – 7.11.1893, second time)
33. James Lidderdale Scott (11.1893 – 26.1.1897)
34. Edward Albert Probst (26.1.1897 – 21.4.1897)
35. Albert Robson Burkill (12.5.1897 – 1.1898)
36. James S. Fearon (1.1898 – 8.1899)
  - Joseph Welch, acting (3.8.1898 – 30.11.1898)
37. Frederick Anderson (8.1899 – 1.1900)
38. Edbert Ansgar Hewett (8.1900 – 25.1.1901)
39. John Prentice (26.1.1901 – 25.1.1902)
40. William George Bayne (25.1.1902 – 1904)
41. Frederick Anderson (1904 – 25.1.1906, second time)
42. Cecil Holliday (25.1.1906 – 24.8.1906)
43. Henry Keswick (24.8.1906 – 5.1907)
44. David Landale (5.1907 – 17.1.1911)
45. Harry De Gray (17.1.1911 – 24.1.1913)
46. Edward Charles Pearce (24.1.1913 – 17.2.1920)
47. Alfred Brooke-Smith (17.2.1920 – 17.3.1922)
48. H.G. Simms (17.3.1922 – 12.10.1923)
49. Stirling Fessenden (12.10.1923 – 5.3.1929)
50. Harry Edward Arnhold (5.3.1929 – 1930)
51. Ernest Macnaghten (1930 – 22.3.1932)
52. A.D. Bell (22.3.1932 – 27.3.1934)
53. Harry Edward Arnhold (27.3.1934 – 4.1937, second time)
54. Cornell Franklin (4.1937 – 4.1940)
55. William Johnstone "Tony" Keswick (4.1940 – 1.5.1941)
56. John Hellyer Liddell (1.5.1941 – 5.1.1942)
57. Katsuo Okazaki (5.1.1942 – 30.7.1943)
58. Yuan Lüdeng (30.7.1943 – 17.12.1943)

=== Legal system ===
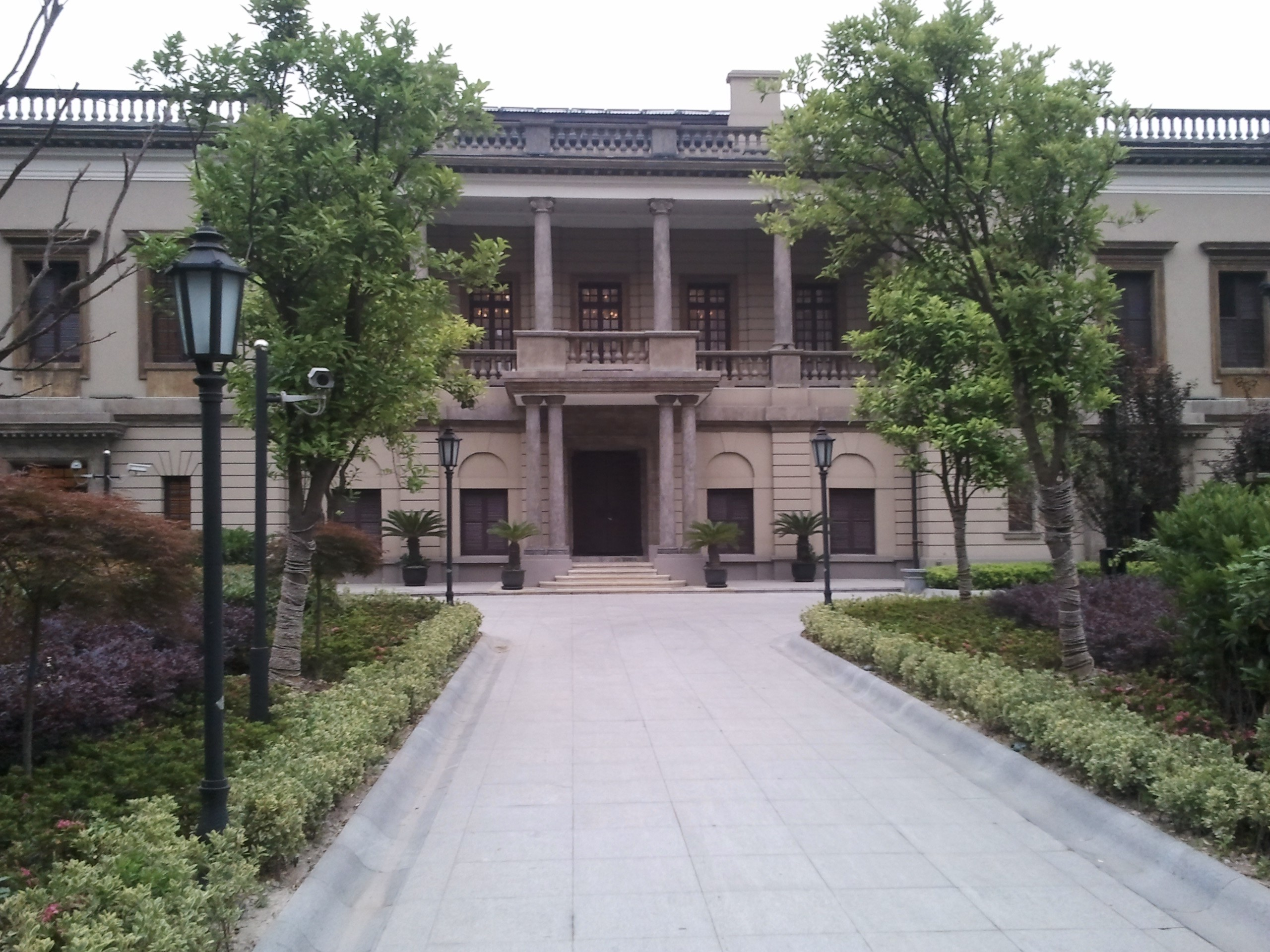
The building of the British Supreme Court for China in Shanghai

The International Settlement did not have a unified legal system. The Municipal Council issued Land Regulations and regulations under this, that were binding on all people in the settlement. Other than this, citizens and subjects of powers that had treaties with China that provided for extraterritorial rights were subject to the laws of their own countries, and civil and criminal complaints against them were required to be brought against them to their consular courts (courts overseen by consular officials) under the laws of their own countries.

The number of treaty powers had climbed to a high of 19 by 1918, but was down to 14 by the 1930s: the United Kingdom, the United States, Japan, France, Italy, Norway, Sweden, Denmark, the Netherlands, Spain, Portugal, Peru, Mexico, and Switzerland. Germany and Austria-Hungary lost their treaty rights after WWI, and Russia gave up its rights as a matter of political expediency. Belgium was declared by China to have lost its rights in 1927. Furthermore, the Chinese government adamantly refused to grant treaty power status to any of the new nations born in the wake of WWI, such as Austria and Hungary (formerly Austria-Hungary), Poland, Czechoslovakia, Yugoslavia, the Baltic states, or Finland.

Chinese citizens and citizens of non-treaty powers were subject to Chinese law. Inside the Settlement, cases against them would be brought to the Mixed Court, a court established in the Settlement in 1864, which existed until 1926. In cases involving foreigners, a foreign assessor, usually a consular officer, would sit with the Chinese magistrate and in many cases acted like a judge. In 1927, a Provisional Court was established with a sole Chinese judge presiding. In 1930, Chinese Special Courts were established which had jurisdiction over all non-treaty power individuals and companies in the Settlement.

Two countries, Britain and the United States, established formal court systems in China to try cases. The British Supreme Court for China and Japan was established in 1865 and located in its own building in the British Consulate compound, and the United States Court for China was established in the US Consulate in 1906. Both courts were occupied by the Japanese on 8 December 1941 and effectively ceased to function from that date.

== Notable people ==
=== Born in the International Settlement ===
- J. G. Ballard, British writer: his acclaimed novel Empire of the Sun is set in the International Settlement and other parts of Shanghai
- Mary Hayley Bell, British actress
- Robert De Grimston, British occultist
- Pat Carney, Canadian politician
- Eileen Chang, Chinese-American writer
- Eunice Crowther, British dancer and choreographer
- Edmond H. Fischer, Swiss-American Nobel Prize–winning biochemist
- Hu Hesheng, Chinese mathematician
- Thierry Jordan, French clergyman and former Archbishop of Reims
- China Machado, Portuguese-Macanese model, Harpers Bazaar editor, TV producer and designer
- Jane Scott, Duchess of Buccleuch, British duchess and fashion model
- Denton Welch, British writer and artist
- Qian Xuesen, Chinese aerospace engineer and father of China's missile and space program
- Terence Young, British film director

=== Residents of the International Settlement ===
- J. Howard Crocker, Canadian educator and sports executive with the YMCA, and commissioned officer in the Shanghai Volunteer Corps
- Eleanor Hinder, social worker with the National YWCA of China (1926–1933) and chief of the social and industrial division of the Shanghai Municipal Council (1933–1942)
- Addie Viola Smith, US trade commissioner in Shanghai (1928–1939)
- Peter Wyngarde, British actor

== Relation with the French Concession ==
The French Concession was governed by a separate municipal council, under the direction of the consul general. The French Concession was not part of the International Settlement, but had economic interests in it as evidenced by the presence of the French flag on the seal and the flag of the Municipal Council.

== See also ==
- American Concession (Shanghai)
- Shanghai French Concession
- Shanghai (1927–1949)
- List of former foreign enclaves in China
- Astor House Hotel (Shanghai)
- British Supreme Court for China and Japan
- The Bund
- China Marines
- Former Consulate-General of the United Kingdom, Shanghai
- Klaus Mehnert
- List of historic buildings in Shanghai
- Richard Sorge
- Shanghai Club
- Saar Protectorate
- Shanghai Municipal Police
- Territory of the Saar Basin
- Tilanqiao Prison (formerly Ward Road Gaol)
- United States Court for China
- When We Were Orphans
- The Blue Lotus
- Empire of the Sun (novel)
- Maiden Voyage (novel)
- Free Territory of Trieste
- Free City of Danzig
- Tangier International Zone
