= List of Legislative Council of Hong Kong members 1843–1941 =

This is a list of members of the Legislative Council in the colonial period from its establishment in 1843 to 1941. It consists of both official and unofficial members. The term of the Legislative Council was interrupted during the Japanese occupation of Hong Kong.

== Change in composition ==
Year	Number of Official Members exclusive of the Governor	Number of Unofficial Members
1843	3	—
1844	5	—
1845	3	—
1850	5	2
1857	5	3
1858	6	3
1865	6	3
1868	5	4
1883	6	5
1896	7	6
1929	9	8

== List of Official members ==
Members	Assumed office	Left office	Background	Remarks
Alexander Robert Johnston	1843	1844	former Administrator	Founding members of the council
John Robert Morrison	1843	1843	Chinese Secretary and Interpreter	Founding members of the council
William Caine	1843	1845	Chief Magistrate	Founding members of the council
George Charles D'Aguilar	1844	1848	Army Major General	
John Walter Hulme	1844	1860	Chief Justice	
Frederick Wright-Bruce	1844	1845	Colonial Secretary	
Robert Montgomery Martin	1844	1845	Colonial Treasurer	
Paul Ivy Sterling	1845		Attorney General	
William Staveley	1848	1851	Army Major General	
William Jervois	1851	1854	Army Major General	
William Thomas Bridges	1854	1856	Acting Attorney General	
Robert Garrett	1854	1857	Army Major General	
William Thomas Mercer	1857	1868	Colonial Secretary	
William Thomas Bridges	1857	1858	Acting Colonial Secretary	
Charles St George Cleverly	1857	1865	Surveyor General	
William Hepburn Rennie	1858	1870	Auditor-General	
William Henry Adams	1860	1865	Chief Justice	
John Jackson Smale	1866	1881	Chief Justice	
George Phillippo	1882	1888	Chief Justice	
James Russell	1888	1892	Chief Justice	
Fielding Clarke	1892	1896	Chief Justice	
John Worrell Carrington	1896	1901	Chief Justice	
William Meigh Goodman	1902	1905	Chief Justice	
Francis Piggott	1905	1912	Chief Justice	
Warren Delabere Barnes	8 June 1911	28 October 1911	Colonial Secretary	
William Rees-Davies	1912	1924	Chief Justice	
Henry Gollan	1924	1930	Chief Justice	
Joseph Horsford Kemp	1930	1933	Chief Justice	
Atholl MacGregor	1934	1941	Chief Justice	

== List of Unofficial members ==
Key:
Elected by/representatives of the Hong Kong General Chamber of Commerce
Elected by/representatives of the Justice of Peace
Chinese representatives
Portuguese representatives

Members	Term of office		Background	Remarks
David Jardine	14 June 1850	8 March 1857	Jardine, Matheson & Co.	Senior Unofficial Member (1850–57)
Joseph Frost Edger	14 June 1850	26 August 1857	Jamieson, How & Co.	
Joseph Jardine	9 March 1857	10 December 1860	Jardine, Matheson & Co.	Senior Unofficial Member (1857–60); vice David Jardine deceased
George Lyall	15 May 1857	10 December 1860	Lyall, Still & Co.	Senior Unofficial Member (1860)
John Dent	26 December 1857	8 November 1861	Dent & Co.	
John Dent	12 May 1866	20 June 1867	Dent & Co.	Senior Unofficial Member (1866–67); vice Francis Chomley resigned
Alexander Perceval	10 December 1860	12 March 1866	Jardine, Matheson & Co.	Senior Unofficial Member (1861–64); vice Joseph Jardine resigned
Angus Fletcher	10 December 1860	16 March 1862	Fletcher & Co.	Vice George Lyall resigned
Francis Chomley	9 November 1861	26 April 1866	Dent & Co.	Senior Unofficial Member (1864–66); vice John Dent resigned
Charles Wilson Murray	17 March 1862	13 September 1864	Birley & Co.	Vice Angus Fletcher resigned
James Whittall	5 April 1864	5 December 1867	Jardine, Matheson & Co.	Senior Unofficial Member (1867); vice Alexander Perceval resigned on leave
James Whittall	9 July 1872	13 July 1875	Jardine, Matheson & Co.	Vice William Keswick resigned
Thomas Sutherland	25 February 1865	26 April 1866	P. & O. Steam Navigation Co.	Vice C. W. Murray resigned on leave
Hugh Bold Gibb	18 May 1866	1867?	Gibb, Livingston & Co.	Vice Thomas Sutherland on leave
Hugh Bold Gibb	1868?	11 November 1870	Gibb, Livingston & Co.	Senior Unofficial Member (1867–71); resigned and replaced by Richard Rowett
Hugh Bold Gibb	29 May 1879	30 December 1879	Gibb, Livingston & Co.	Resigned and replaced by Ng Choy
Phineas Ryrie	23 July 1867	1868?	Turner & Co.	Vice John Dent resigned
Phineas Ryrie	1870?	7 December 1891	Turner & Co.	Senior Unofficial Member (1871–92); vice J. B. Taylor; reappointed on 1 March 1890; died in office
Francis Parry	23 July 1867	21 February 1868	Birley & Co.	Vice H. B. Gibb absent on leave
William Keswick	21 February 1868	16 May 1872	Jardine, Matheson & Co.	Vice James Whittall on leave
William Keswick	2 September 1875	23 September 1887	Jardine, Matheson & Co.	Vice James Whittall resigned
James Banks Taylor	3 October 1868	30 September 1869	Smith, Archer & Co.	Vice Phineas Ryrie on leave
James Pender Duncanson	1 May 1868	23 May 1868	Gibb, Livingston & Co.	Vice Francis Parry resigned
Henry John Ball	26 February 1869	11 September 1871	Judge of the Summary Court	Sitting as unofficial; Absent on leave and replaced by Richard Rowett
Henry John Ball	10 December 1872	30 September 1873	Judge of the Summary Court	Sitting as unofficial; Absent on leave and replaced by Richard Rowett
Richard Rowett	24 September 1869	1870?	Holiday, Wise & Co.	
Richard Rowett	25 January 1871?	18 November 1871	Holiday, Wise & Co.	Absent on leave and replaced by Henry Lowcock
Richard Rowett	24 February 1873	16 November 1874	Holiday, Wise & Co.	Resigned and replaced by Henry Lowcock
Henry Lowcock	25 March 1872	11 February 1873	Gibb, Livingston & Co.	
Henry Lowcock	23 February 1875	26 February 1879	Gibb, Livingston & Co.	Resigned and replaced by H. B. Gibb
James Greig	25 March 1872	25 September 1872	Hongkong and Shanghai Banking Corporation	Vice Henry John Ball on leave
William Hastings Alexander	29 May 1872	7 January 1876	Registrar of the Supreme Court	Sitting as unofficial
John MacNeile Price	2 March 1877	19 February 1878	Surveyor General	Sitting as unofficial
John MacNeile Price	18 January 1879	28 December 1883	Surveyor General	Sitting as unofficial
Ng Choy	26 February 1880	24 March 1883	Barrister-at-law	First Chinese member; Senior Chinese Unofficial Member (1880–82)
Francis Bulkeley Johnson	19 January 1878	29 April 1878	Jardine, Matheson & Co.	Vice Wiliam Keswick absent on leave
Francis Bulkeley Johnson	3 June 1881	5 March 1884	Jardine, Matheson & Co.	Vice Wiliam Keswick absent on leave
Thomas Child Hayllar	15 October 1878	21 December 1878		Sitting as an unofficial during J. M. Price acting as Colonial Secretary
Emanuel Raphael Belilios	23 August 1881	5 September 1882	Belilios & Co.	Vice J. M. Price absent on leave
Emanuel Raphael Belilios	25 February 1892	5 April 1900	Belilios & Co.	Senior Unofficial Member (1892–1900); vice Phineas Ryrie deceased; reappointed on 25 February 1898
Frederick Stewart	26 March 1883	28 December 1883	Registrar-General	Sitting as an unofficial
Thomas Jackson	28 February 1884	2 September 1887	Hongkong and Shanghai Banking Corporation	Elected by the Chamber of Commerce on 2 January
Frederick David Sassoon	28 February 1884	13 January 1888	David Sassoon Sons & Co.	
Wong Shing	28 February 1884	24 February 1890		Senior Chinese Unofficial Member (1884–89)
Henry George Thomsett	23 April 1884	3 July 1884	Royal Navy	Harbour Master sitting as unofficial
Henry George Thomsett	27 August 1886	8 February 1888	Royal Navy	Harbour Master sitting as unofficial
Alexander Palmer MacEwen	27 August 1886	1886?	Holiday, Wise & Co.	Elected 27 April vice Thomas Jackson on leave
Alexander Palmer MacEwen	19 September 1887?	21 July 1890	Holiday, Wise & Co.	Elected 17 September on retirement of Thomas Jackson
John Bell-Irving	27 August 1886	1886?	Jardine, Matheson & Co.	Vice William Keswick on leave
John Bell-Irving	14 August 1887?	29 April 1890	Jardine, Matheson & Co.	Vice William Keswick resigned
Catchick Paul Chater	10 December 1886	1887?	Broker	Vice Frederick D. Sasssoon on leave Appointed as one-day member on 19 July 1919 and 23 November 1925
Catchick Paul Chater	17 January 1888?	7 December 1905	Broker	Vice Frederick D. Sasssoon on leave Appointed as one-day member on 19 July 1919 and 23 November 1925
Bendyshe Layton	4 June 1888	20 November 1889	Gibb Livingston & Co.	Elected 22 May vice A. MacEwen on leave
James Johnstone Keswick	18 April 1889	1889?	Jardine, Matheson & Co.	Vice J. Bell-Irving absent on leave
James Johnstone Keswick	2 May 1890?	1896?	Jardine, Matheson & Co.	Vice J. Bell-Irving resigned
James Johnstone Keswick	18 May 1899?	14 March 1901	Jardine, Matheson & Co.	Vice J. J. Bell-Irving absent on leave
Ho Kai	1 March 1890	7 March 1912		Senior Chinese Unofficial Member (1890–1914); Senior Unofficial Member (1906–14); re-appointed in 1896, 1902, 1908; retired on 28 February 1914
Ho Kai	2 May 1912	26 February 1914		Senior Chinese Unofficial Member (1890–1914); Senior Unofficial Member (1906–14); re-appointed in 1896, 1902, 1908; retired on 28 February 1914
Thomas Henderson Whitehead	6 October 1890	14 June 1892	Chartered Bank of India, Australia and China	Elected by 18 September, on resignation of A. MacEwen
Thomas Henderson Whitehead	7 March 1894	13 April 1902	Chartered Bank of India, Australia and China	Re-elected 19 September 1896 on expiry of term
James Jardine Bell-Irving	16 November 1892	8 March 1893	Jardine, Matheson & Co.	Vice J. J. Keswick on leave
James Jardine Bell-Irving	23 May 1895	1895?	Jardine, Matheson & Co.	Vice J. J. Keswick on leave
James Jardine Bell-Irving	23 October 1896?	18 April 1899	Jardine, Matheson & Co.	Vice J. J. Keswick resigned
James Jardine Bell-Irving	15 July 1901	30 April 1902	Jardine, Matheson & Co.	Vice J. J. Keswick on leave
Alexander McConachie	11 June 1894	14 December 1895	Gilman & Co.	Elected 9 June vice T. H. Whitehead on leave
Wei Yuk	3 December 1896	11 October 1917		Senior Unofficial Member & Senior Chinese Unofficial Member (1914–17); reappointed in 1902 1908, 1914; retired on expiry of term
Roderick Mackenzie Gray	1 May 1900	14 March 1901	Reiss & Co.	Vice Emanuel Belilios resigned
Herbert Smith	7 May 1900	14 May 1900	Butterfield & Swire	Elected 30 April vice T. H. Whitehead on leave
John Thurburn	25 June 1900	12 July 1901	Chartered Mercantile Bank	Elected 18 June vice H. Smith resigned
John Thurburn	8 August 1901	10 April 1902	Chartered Mercantile Bank	Vice R. M. Gray resigned
George William Forbes Playfair	11 June 1902	23 December 1902		Acted during P. Chater's leave
Charles Stewart Sharp	23 April 1902	27 February 1903	Gibb, Livingston & Co.	Vice John Thurburn resigned
Charles Wedderburn Dickson	28 May 1902	17 May 1906	Jardine, Matheson & Co.	Vice J. J. Bell-Irving resigned
Robert Gordon Shewan	23 June 1902	7 December 1905	Shewan, Tomes & Co.	Elected 5 June vice Whitehead on leave; Elected 3 October, expiry of term
Robert Gordon Shewan	25 May 1917	27 December 1917	Shewan, Tomes & Co.	Vice Edward Shellim on leave
Robert Gordon Shewan	1 January 1919	23 December 1919	Shewan, Tomes & Co.	Vice Edward Shellim retired
Henry Edward Pollock, K.C.	17 September 1903	17 May 1904	Barrister-at-Law	Elected 12 August vice Robert Gordon Shewan on leave
Henry Edward Pollock, K.C.	22 February 1906	27 February 1919	Barrister-at-Law	Senior Unofficial Member (1917–41); reappointed in 1912, 1918, 1924, 1928, 1932, 1936, 1940
Henry Edward Pollock, K.C.	23 December 1919	5 March 1925	Barrister-at-Law	Senior Unofficial Member (1917–41); reappointed in 1912, 1918, 1924, 1928, 1932, 1936, 1940
Henry Edward Pollock, K.C.	4 December 1925	26 April 1928	Barrister-at-Law	Senior Unofficial Member (1917–41); reappointed in 1912, 1918, 1924, 1928, 1932, 1936, 1940
Henry Edward Pollock, K.C.	20 December 1928	12 September 1940	Barrister-at-Law	Senior Unofficial Member (1917–41); reappointed in 1912, 1918, 1924, 1928, 1932, 1936, 1940
Gershom Stewart	20 April 1903	1904?	Bill Broker	Vice C. S. Sharp absent
Gershom Stewart	24 September 1904?	22 February 1906	Bill Broker	Vice C. S. Sharp resigned
William Jardine Gresson	17 May 1904	15 December 1904?	Jardine, Matheson & Co.	Vice C. W. Dickson on leave
William Jardine Gresson	1 June 1906?	14 April 1910	Jardine, Matheson & Co.	Vice C. W. Dickson resigned
Edward Osborne	17 May 1906	1907?	H.K. and Kowloon Wharf and Godown Co.	Vice G. Stewart absent
Edward Osborne	19 December 1907?	19 December 1912	H.K. and Kowloon Wharf and Godown Co.	Vice G. Stewart resigned
Edbert Ansgar Hewett	17 May 1906	28 October 1915	P. & O. Steam Navigation Co.	Elected 26 April vice Shewan resigned; reappointed in 1912; died in office
Henry Keswick	23 May 1907	1908?	Jardine, Matheson & Co.	Vice W. J. Gresson on leave
Henry Keswick	5 May 1910?	20 April 1911	Jardine, Matheson & Co.	Vice W. J. Gresson on resigned
Murray Stewart	16 April 1908	1908?	Stewart Bros.	Elected 17 March vice Hewett on leave
Murray Stewart	29 May 1909?	27 October 1910	Stewart Bros.	Nominated by JP vice H. E. Pollock on leave
Murray Stewart	23 May 1912	22 August 1912	Stewart Bros.	Elected 25 May vice Hewett on leave
Sir Henry Spencer Berkeley, K.C.	14 May 1908	24 July 1908	Barrister-at-Law	Vice H. Keswick on leave
Henry Adolphus Warre Slade	13 May 1908	1 April 1909	Gilman & Co.	Vice E. Osborne on leave
Charles Montague Ede	26 April 1911	19 October 1911	Union Insurance Society of Canton	Vice Edward Osborne on leave
Charles Montague Ede	13 February 1913	30 October 1913	Union Insurance Society of Canton	Elected by JP vice H. E. Pollock on leave
Charles Montague Ede	31 July 1924	29 December 1924	Union Insurance Society of Canton	Vice A. O. Lang on leave
Charles Henderson Ross	3 May 1911	17 April 1913	Jardine, Matheson & Co.	Vice H. Keswick on leave
John Whyte Cooper Bonnar	12 September 1912	19 December 1912	Gibb, Livingston & Co.	Elected 10 September 1912 on resignation of M. Stewart
Edward Shellim	16 March 1913	3 October 1918	David Sassoon & Co.	Vice E. Osborne resigned
David Landale	29 May 1913	31 October 1916	Jardine, Matheson & Co. Hongkong and Shanghai Banking Corporation	Vice C. H. Ross resigned
David Landale	21 February 1918	10 April 1919	Jardine, Matheson & Co. Hongkong and Shanghai Banking Corporation	
Lau Chu-pak	9 October 1913	30 March 1922		Vice Ho Kai absent; appointed on 2 March 1914 vice Ho Kai retired; Senior Chinese Unofficial Member (1917–22); reappointed in 1920; died in office
Percy Hobson Holyoak	16 December 1915	3 November 1921	Reiss & Co. Holyoak, Massey & Co., Ltd.	Elected on 10 December 1915 vice E. A. Hewett deceased; reappointed in 1921; died in office
Percy Hobson Holyoak	15 February 1923	18 March 1926	Reiss & Co. Holyoak, Massey & Co., Ltd.	Return from leave on 3 January 1923; appointed as one-day member on 18 July 1928
Charles Edward Anton	7 November 1916	27 December 1917	Jardine, Matheson & Co.	Appointed vice David Landale on leave
Stanley Hudson Dodwell	7 June 1917	October 1917?	Dodwell & Co. Hongkong and Shanghai Banking Corporation	Elected 29 May vice P. H. Holyoak on leave
Stanley Hudson Dodwell	11 October 1918?	1919?	Dodwell & Co. Hongkong and Shanghai Banking Corporation	Appointed vice Edward Shellim on leave
Stanley Hudson Dodwell	10 March 1919?	October 1919?	Dodwell & Co. Hongkong and Shanghai Banking Corporation	Appointed vice R. G. Shewan on leave
Stanley Hudson Dodwell	1 January 1920?	4 March 1920	Dodwell & Co. Hongkong and Shanghai Banking Corporation	Appointed vice R. G. Shewan retired
Stanley Hudson Dodwell	8 November 1934	22 November 1934	Dodwell & Co. Hongkong and Shanghai Banking Corporation	Vice W. H. Bell on leave
Stanley Hudson Dodwell	6 April 1936	26 June 1941	Dodwell & Co. Hongkong and Shanghai Banking Corporation	Vice W. E. Shenton resigned
Ho Fook	23 October 1917	14 November 1921		Appointed vice Wei Yuk retired
Herbert William Bird	28 August 1918	17 October 1918	Architect, Palmer & Turner	Elected by JP vice H. E. Pollock on leave
Herbert William Bird	7 April 1921	1922	Architect, Palmer & Turner	Vice A. V. D. Parr on leave
Herbert William Bird	26 May 1922	26 October 1922	Architect, Palmer & Turner	Vice A. G. Stephen on leave
Herbert William Bird	31 July 1924	18 July 1928	Architect, Palmer & Turner	
Chan Kai-ming	3 October 1918	13 November 1918		Vice Lau Chu-pak on leave
Chaloner Grenville Alabaster K.C.	10 April 1919	31 October 1919	Barrister-at-Law	Vice H. E. Pollock acting Attorney General
Chaloner Grenville Alabaster K.C.	31 July 1924	1924?	Barrister-at-Law	Vice H. E. Pollock on leave
Chaloner Grenville Alabaster K.C.	21 March 1925?	23 November 1925	Barrister-at-Law	Vice H. E. Pollock on leave
Edward Victor David Parr	17 May 1919	1919?	Mackinnon, Mackenzie & Co. Hongkong and Shanghai Banking Corporation	Elected 13 May vice P. H. Holyoak on leave
Edward Victor David Parr	5 September 1919?	1919?	Mackinnon, Mackenzie & Co. Hongkong and Shanghai Banking Corporation	
Edward Victor David Parr	26 March 1920?	31 May 1923	Mackinnon, Mackenzie & Co. Hongkong and Shanghai Banking Corporation	
John Johnstone	5 June 1919	3 March 1921	Jardine, Matheson & Co.	Vice David Landale retired
Arthur Rylands Lowe	17 June 1920	24 June 1920	Lowe Bingham & Matthew	Vice H. E. Pollock on leave
Arthur Rylands Lowe	1 June 1922	1922?	Lowe Bingham & Matthew	Vice H. E. Pollock on leave
Arthur Rylands Lowe	30 October 1923?	22 May 1924	Lowe Bingham & Matthew	Vice H. W. Bird on leave
Alexander Gordon Stephen	5 April 1921	14 June 1923	Hongkong and Shanghai Banking Corporation	Vice on John Johnstone retired
Archibald Orr Lang	22 April 1921	18 June 1921?	Gibb, Livingston & Co.	Elected 21 April 1921 vice H. Holyoak on leave
Archibald Orr Lang	10 November 1921?	3 January 1923?	Gibb, Livingston & Co.	Elected 24 November 1921 vice P. H. Holyoak on leave
Archibald Orr Lang	11 June 1923?	18 July 1928	Gibb, Livingston & Co.	Vice E. V. D. Parr resigned
Chau Siu-ki	28 April 1921	30 April 1921		Vice Ho Fook on leave
Chau Siu-ki	31 May 1923	1923?		Vice Ng Hon-tsz deceased
Chau Siu-ki	5 March 1924?	28 August 1924		Vice Chow Shou-son on leave
Chow Shou-son	8 December 1921	22 October 1931		Vice Ho Fook retired; Senior Chinese Unofficial Member (1922–31)
Ng Hon-tsz	8 June 1922	22 February 1923		Vice Lau Chu-pak deceased
Robert Hormus Kotewall	28 March 1923	3 October 1935	H.K. Mercantile Co., Ltd.	Senior Chinese Unofficial Member (1931–35); Vice Robert Kotewall on leave
Dallas Gerald Mercer Bernard	20 April 1926	29 March 1928	Jardine, Matheson & Co. Hongkong and Shanghai Banking Corporation	Elected 16 April 1926 vice P. H. Holyoak on leave; Elected 14 June & appointed 15 June 1926 vice Mr. P. H. Holyoak deceased
Wilfred Miller Vincent Koch	26 July 1926	15 October 1926	Medical Faculty, University	Vice H. E. Pollock on leave
Arthur Cecil Hynes	4 April 1927	23 January 1930	Hongkong and Shanghai Banking Corporation	Vice A. O. Lang resigned
John Owen Hughes	16 June 1927	2 April 1931	Harry Wicking & Co.	Elected 16 May
John Owen Hughes	4 May 1934	22 November 1934	Harry Wicking & Co.	
William Edward Leonard Shenton	16 June 1927	1927?	Solicitor	Vice H. E. Pollock on leave
William Edward Leonard Shenton	3 April 1928?	19 March 1936	Solicitor	Vice D. G. M. Bernard resigned
Charles Gordon Stewart Mackie	28 June 1928	4 October 1928	Gibb, Livingston & Co.	Vice H. E. Pollock on leave
Charles Gordon Stewart Mackie	19 June 1930	1931?	Gibb, Livingston & Co.	Vice H. E. Pollock on leave
Charles Gordon Stewart Mackie	7 May 1931?	28 March 1935	Gibb, Livingston & Co.	Elected 4 May vice J. O. Hughes resigned
Jose Pedro Braga	17 January 1929	6 January 1937	Braga & Co.	First Portuguese representative
Ts'o Seen-wan	24 January 1929	6 January 1937		Senior Chinese Unofficial Member (1935–37)
Benjamin David Fleming Beith	28 June 1928	31 October 1929	Jardine, Matheson & Co.	Vice J. O. Hughes on leave
Benjamin David Fleming Beith	15 March 1930?	1933?	Jardine, Matheson & Co.	Vice A. C. Hynes resigned
John Johnstone Paterson	17 April 1930	13 November 1941	Jardine, Matheson & Co.	Provisionally vice B. D. F. Beith on leave; appointed in succession of B. D. F. Beith; reappoiinted in 1934, 1938
Antonio Ferreira Batalha Silva-Netto	19 June 1930	26 June 1930	Silva-Netto & Co.	Vice J. P. Braga on leave
Antonio Ferreira Batalha Silva-Netto	21 May 1936	22 July 1936	Silva-Netto & Co.	
William Henry Bell	14 May 1931	1931?	Asiatic Petroleum Co. (South China) Ltd.	Vice J. O. Hughes resigned
William Henry Bell	1 April 1932?	1933?	Asiatic Petroleum Co. (South China) Ltd.	Vice C. G. S. on leave
William Henry Bell	12 April 1934?	October 1934?	Asiatic Petroleum Co. (South China) Ltd.	Vice J. J. Paterson on leave
William Henry Bell	12 April 1935?	22 July 1936	Asiatic Petroleum Co. (South China) Ltd.	Elected 5 April on resignation of C. G. S. Mackie
Chau Tsun-nin	10 December 1931	16 November 1939		Senior Chinese Unofficial Member (1937–39); reappointed in 1935, 1939
Lo Man-kam	9 November 1935	25 December 1941?	Solicitor	Senior Chinese Unofficial Member (1935–41)
Marcus Theodore Johnson	8 June 1936	1936?	Mackinnon, Mackenzie & Co.	Vice H. E. Pollock on leave
Marcus Theodore Johnson	21 May 1937?	20 April 1938	Mackinnon, Mackenzie & Co.	Elected May vice A. W. Hughes resigned
Edgar Davidson	26 August 1936	1936?	Solicitor (Hastings & Co.)	Vice S. H. Dodwell on leave
Edgar Davidson	25 May 1937?	22 December 1937	Solicitor (Hastings & Co.)	Vice S. H. Dodwell on leave
Edgar Davidson	7 June 1941	13 November 1941	Solicitor (Hastings & Co.)	Vice S. H. Dodwell on leave
Arthur William Hughes	28 July 1936	14 April 1937	Union Insurance Society of Canton Ltd.	Elected 26 July on resignation of W. H. Bell.
Leo d'Almada e Castro, Jr.	3 February 1937	13 November 1941	Barrister-at-Law	Vice J. P. Braga; reappointed in 1941
Li Shu-fan	3 February 1937	16 January 1941	Medical Practitioner	Vice Tso Seen-wan
Andrew Lusk Shields	29 April 1938	13 November 1941	Shewan Tomes & Co.	Vice M. T. Johnson on leave; elected 7 October on resignstion of M. T. Johnson
John Keith Bousfield	27 May 1939	14 September 1939	Asiatic Petroleum Co. (South China) Ltd.	Elected on 25 May vice A. L. Shields on leave
Li Tse-fong	20 July 1939	28 December 1939		Vice Li Shu-fan on leave
Li Tse-fong	20 February 1941	13 November 1941		Vice Li Shu-fan retired
Thomas Ernest Pearce	11 March 1939	13 November 1941	J. D. Hutchison & Co.	Vice J. J. Paterson on leave
William Ngartse Thomas Tam	17 March 1939	13 November 1941		In succession of Chau Tsun-nin

== See also ==
- List of Executive Council of Hong Kong unofficial members 1896–1941
- List of Legislative Council of Hong Kong unofficial members 1946–1985

== Bibliography ==
- Endacott, G. B. Government and people in Hong Kong, 1841–1962 : a constitutional history Hong Kong University Press. (1964)
- Hong Kong General Chamber of Commerce. Hong Kong General Chamber of Commerce 1925: Annual Report. (1925)
- Hong Kong General Chamber of Commerce. Hong Kong General Chamber of Commerce 1966: Annual Report. (1966)
