= St. Andrew's Society of Hong Kong =

- 香港聖安德烈會
- Formation: 1881
- Type: Club
- Region served: Hong Kong
- Chieftain: Mr. Andrew Weir
- Vice Chieftain: Dr. Lindsay Porter
- Website: www.standrewshk.org

The St. Andrew's Society of Hong Kong (香港聖安德烈會) is a Scottish club in Hong Kong established in 1881.

== History ==
In the early 19th century, Canton was the centre of China's foreign trade and the base of the foreign trading community. Several St. Andrew's Dinners, celebration of the St. Andrew's Day, were held during the 1830s in Canton. Being closely associated with the Jardine, Matheson & Co. which was established by the Scotsmen, the Scottish community were strong in Canton as well as Hong Kong, where the Jardine Matheson & Co. set up their headquarters and established their offices and accommodation at East Point after it was occupied by Britain in 1841.

The St. Andrew’s Dinners were held at East Point from the 1850s until it was moved to the Hong Kong Club in Central, at that time located at the corner of Queen’s Road Central and Wyndham Street.

The St. Andrew’s Dinners were turned into an Annual Ball from 1877. Before 1881, the Ball was held by an ad-hoc committee. In 1882, when the St. Andrew's Society was established, Society has been responsible for the St. Andrews's Ball and later the Burns Night.

The St. Andrew's Challenge Quaich (聖安度挑戰碟), which is now held every year at the Happy Valley Racecourse, is founded and awarded by the Society.

== Past Chieftains ==
- Mr. Phineas Ryrie, 1882–90
- Mr. J. J. Keswick, 1890–92
- Mr. David Gillies, 1892–93
- Mr. J. J. Keswick, 1893–94
- Mr. Fullarton Henderson, 1895–96
- Mr. J. H. Stewart Lockhart KCMG, 1896–97
- Mr. J. J. Bell Irving, 1897–99
- Capt. C. G. Anderson, 1899–1900
- Mr. James McKie, 1900–01
- Mr. T. H. Whitehead, 1901–02
- Mr. H. W. Robertson, 1902–03
- Mr. G. W. Playfair, 1903–04
- Mr. Alex Rennie, 1904–05
- Sir Gershom Stewart KBE, 1905–06
- Mr. T. F. Hough, 1906–07
- Mr. Robert Shewan, 1907–08
- Mr. W. Chatham CMG, 1908–09
- Mr. J. R. M. Smith, 1909–10
- Mr. Murray Stewart, 1910–11
- Mr. C. H. Ross, 1911–12
- Mr. W. Dickson, 1912–13
- Mr. J. W. C. Bonnar, 1913–14
- Mr. David Landale, 1914–15
- Mr. Donald Macdonald, 1915–16
- Mr. A. G. Gordon, 1916–17
- Mr. C. E. Anton, 1917–18
- Mr. R. M. Dyer, 1918–19
- Mr. G. M. Young MBE, 1919–20
- Mr. John Johnstone, 1920–21
- Mr. A. O. Lang, 1921–22
- Mr. A. G. Stephen, 1922–23
- Mr. R. Sutherland OBE, 1923–24
- Mr. J. Reid, 1924–25
- Dr. G. D. R. Black, 1925–26
- Mr. R. M. Dyer, 1926–27
- Mr. D. Templeton, 1927–28
- Mr. C. Gordon Mackie, 1928–29
- Mr. A. H. Ferguson, 1929–30
- Mr. T. H. R. Shaw, 1930–31
- Mr. A. Stevenson, 1931–32
- Mr. K. E. Greig, 1932–33
- Mr. A. L. Shields, 1933–34
- Mr. A. S. Mackichan, 1934–35
- Mr. J. C. Macgown, 1934–35
- Mr. R. M. Mclay, 1935–36
- Mr. W. Kay, 1936–37
- Sir Atholl Macgregor, 1937–38
- Dr. G. D. R. Black, 1939–40
- Mr. B. Wylie, 1940–41
- Mr. K. S. Morrison, 1941–42
- Mr. A. S. Mackichan, 1946–47
- Mr. J. F. Macgregor, 1947–48
- Mr. J. W. Anderson, 1948–49
- Mr. D. S. Robb, 1949–50
- Mr. J. Fennie, 1950–51
- Mr. A. S. Anderson, 1951–52
- Mr. D. L. Prophet, 1952–53
- Mr. J. Mckelvie, 1953–54
- Mr. H. R. M. Cleland, 1954–55
- Mr. J. A. Blackwood, 1955–56
- Mr. J. Moodie, 1956–57
- Mr. R. P. Moodie, 1957–58
- Mr. A. W. Black, 1958–59
- Mr. C. G. Smith, 1959–60
- Mr. J. F. Scott, 1960–61
- Sir John Kinloch, Bart., 1961–62
- Mr. J. B. H. Leckie, 1962–63
- Mr. R. G. L. Oliphant, 1963–64
- Mr. J. R. Leitch, 1964–65
- Dr. R. G. M. Wedderburn, 1965–66
- Sir Michael Herries OBE MC, 1966–67
- Mr. K. A. Miller, 1967–68
- Mr. C. H. W. Robertson, 1968–69
- Mr. G. R. Ross CBE, 1969–70
- Mr. O. L. Work, 1970–71
- Mr. A. G. S. McCallum CBE, 1971–72
- Mr. J. D. Mackie, 1972–73
- Mr. M M. Smith, 1973–74
- Mr. T. T. Harley, 1974–75
- Mr. I. H. Macdonald OBE, 1975–76
- Mr. L. W. Gordon OBE, 1976–77
- Mr. A. B. McNutt CPM, 1977–78
- Mr. D. J. T. Mckenzie, 1978–79
- Mr. H. H. Ross MBE, 1979–80
- Sir William Purves CBE DSO, 1980–81
- Mr. D. W. McDonald CMG, 1981–82
- Mr. R. T. M. Henry MVO OBE QPM CPM, 1982–83
- Mr. J. M. Collins, 1983–84
- Dr. J. Park, 1984–85
- Mr. R. W. Campbell, 1985–86
- Mr. A. R. Hamilton, 1986–87
- Mr. S. Robertson, 1987–88
- Mr. A. H. Lamont, 1988–89
- Mr. J. E. Thornhill, 1989–90
- Mr. C. H. Wilken, 1990–91
- Mr. D. M. Watson OBE QPM CPM, 1991–92
- Mr. D. W. Gairns, 1992–93
- Mr. S. H. Leckie OBE, 1993–94
- Mr. M. J. Moir, 1994–95
- Mr. R. Samuel, 1995–96
- Mr. M. K. Brown, 1996–97
- Mr. K. G. Morrison, 1997–98
- Mr. J. C. Lang, 1998–99
- Mr. J. Blaauw, 1999–2000
- Mr. G. Ure, 2000–01
- Mr. A. Morrison, 2001–02
- Mr. J. Budge SBS MBE, 2002–03
- Mr. M. Byres, 2003–04
- Mr. F. Innes, 2004–05
- Mr. G. Soutar, 2005–06
- Mr. R. McKeown, 2006–07
- Mr. P. Curran, 2007–08
- Mr. J. Bruce, 2008–09
- Ms. F. J. Donnelly, 2009–10
- Mr. Neil Orvay, 2010–11
- Ms. J. Donaldson, 2011–12
- Mr. Alan Mctaggart, 2012–13
- Mr. Graeme Brechin, 2013–14
- Mr. S. Saunders MBE, 2014–15
- Mr. Alan Forbes MacDonald, 2015–16
- Mr. Alan Dalgleish, 2016–17
- Mr. Charles McLaughlin, 2017–18
- Ms. Angela Lunn, 2018–19
- Mr. Roy Kinnear, 2019-20
- Mr. N. J. MacLeod, 2020-21
- Mrs. Jenna Fitzgerald, 2021-22
- Mr. Scott Semple, 2022-23
- Ms. Fiona Cheng, 2023-24
