= Herbert William Bird =

British architect

Herbert William Godfrey Bird (23 March 1872 – 1 June 1945) was a British architect and member of the Legislative Council of Hong Kong.

Bird was born in Walmer, Kent, England, the son of Colonel Frederic Vincent Godfrey Bird, R.M.L.I. and Anne Narcissa Eliza Bird. His father died in 1899.

He was the nephew of architect and civil engineer Sotheby Godfrey Bird, a long-time resident in Hong Kong who arrived in 1857 and carried out the first survey of Hong Kong. He went to Hong Kong to join the Palmer and Turner architect firm as an assistant in around 1892 or 1893. He became Fellow of the Royal Institute of British Architects in 1897. He succeeded Arthur Turner as the partner of the Palmer & Turner in 1901 until 1928 and an authorised architect from 1903. He had designed many of Hong Kong's best known buildings. His brothers Eustace Edward Godfrey Bird and Lennox Godfrey Bird were also architects. and partner of the Palmer & Turner.

In 1911, he was appointed member of the Authorised Architects Committee vice Arthur Turner on leave and again in 1917. He subsequently took Edward Osborne's seat as the unofficial member of the Licensing Board. He was also member of the Legislative Council of Hong Kong appointed in 1918 and again in 1921 and became a regular member from 1923 until 1927.

He left Hong Kong on the SS Empress of Russia on 20 April 1927. During his residence in Hong Kong, he was the owner of a property on Lugard Road (No. 27) from 1914, which was built by his brother Lennox, until it was sold to the Taikoo Dockyard & Engineering Co. in 1930 as a residence of their staff.

Legislative Council of Hong Kong
Preceded by Henry Edward Pollock	Unofficial Member; Representative for Justices of the Peace; 1918	Succeeded by Henry Edward Pollock
Preceded by Edward Victor David Parr	Unofficial Member; 1921–1922	Succeeded by Edward Victor David Parr
Preceded by Alexander Gordon Stephen	Unofficial Member; 1922	Succeeded by Alexander Gordon Stephen
Preceded by Alexander Gordon Stephen	Unofficial Member; 1923–1927	Succeeded by Dallas Gerald Mercer Bernard
