= Arthur Lowe (disambiguation) =

Arthur Lowe (1915-1982) was an English actor.

Arthur Lowe may also refer to:

- Arthur Lowe (tennis) (1886–1958), English tennis player
- Arthur Lowe (painter) (1865–1940), English artist
- Arthur Lowe (footballer) (1906–1950), Australian rules footballer
- Arthur Rylands Lowe (1873–1924), British accountant

== See also ==
- Lowe (disambiguation)
- List of people with surname Lowe
