= Charles Montague Ede =

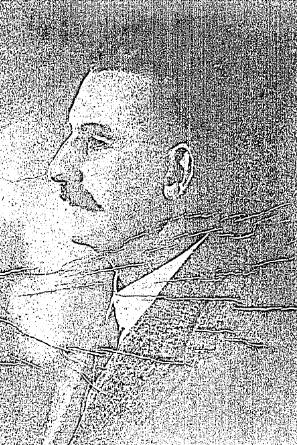

Charles Montague Ede, JP (7 October 1864 – 22 May 1925) was a Hong Kong businessman and unofficial member of the Executive Council and Legislative Council of Hong Kong.

== Business career ==
Ede was born in Istanbul, Ottoman Empire to a Cornish family. He joined the Union Insurance Society of Canton in March 1884 where his uncle N. J. Ede was the secretary for many years and then the manager of the company.

He worked for the insurance company for 40 years and was manager of the Shanghai branch and had also stationed in North China and Yokohama. He became the general manager of the company in 1908 in succession to W. J. Saunders. Under his leadership, the Union Insurance Society of Canton expanded as a global insurance company, opened up new branches at Tokyo, Hankou, Tianjin, Surabaya, Bombay, Sydney, Adelaide, Brisbane, Perth, Auckland, Wellington, Christchurch, Vancouver, Toronto, Buenos Ayres, Cario and Johannesburg and numerous other agencies.

The company merged with the North China Insurance Co. in 1911 and the China Fire Insurance Co. in 1915. The capital of the company increased to $4,000,000 in 1915 and four years later to £2,000,000. When Ede retired due to ill health and replaced by Paul Lauder in May 1924, the total assets of the company had already exceeded over five millions.

== Public services ==
During his time in China he involved in the Chinese politics as being an adviser to the Viceroy of Liangjiang when in Shanghai and adviser to Viceroy of Sichuan. He helped set up the China Consortium to draw agreements with various governments. He also served in the Shanghai Municipal Council and organised a famine relief fund in the 1890s.

After he moved to Hong Kong, he joined the Hong Kong General Chamber of Commerce and was on the committee of the Chamber. He was made Justice of the Peace since February 1908and appointed as unofficial member of the Legislative Council for the first time in April 1911, When Henry Pollock, unofficial member of the Legislative Council elected by Justices of Peace February 1913, Ede was nominated by the Justices of Peace to the Legislative Council. He was also an unofficial member of the Executive Council appointed in 1922 during the absence of Henry Pollock. He was appointed to the Executive Council twice again in 1924 after his announced his retirement from the company.

Besides his services in the Executive and Legislative Councils, Ede was also member of the Executive Committee of the Peace Celebration and War Memorial Committee and later on appointed chairman of the Reception Committee for the Prince of Wales visit to Hong Kong.

Among other public services, he was member of the court of the University of Hong Kong when the university was newly established and founding director of YMCA of Hong Kong.

During the First World War, Ede was the chairman of the War Propaganda Committee for the Allied Powers. On the foundation of his propaganda works he established the publishing house Publicity Bureau for South China at 10 Regent Street, London in 1919. His wife Mrs. Gertrude Ede also received the Order of Queen Elisabeth of Belgium by the Albert I of Belgium for her personal assistance to Belgian charities during the war.

== Housing and industrial relations ==
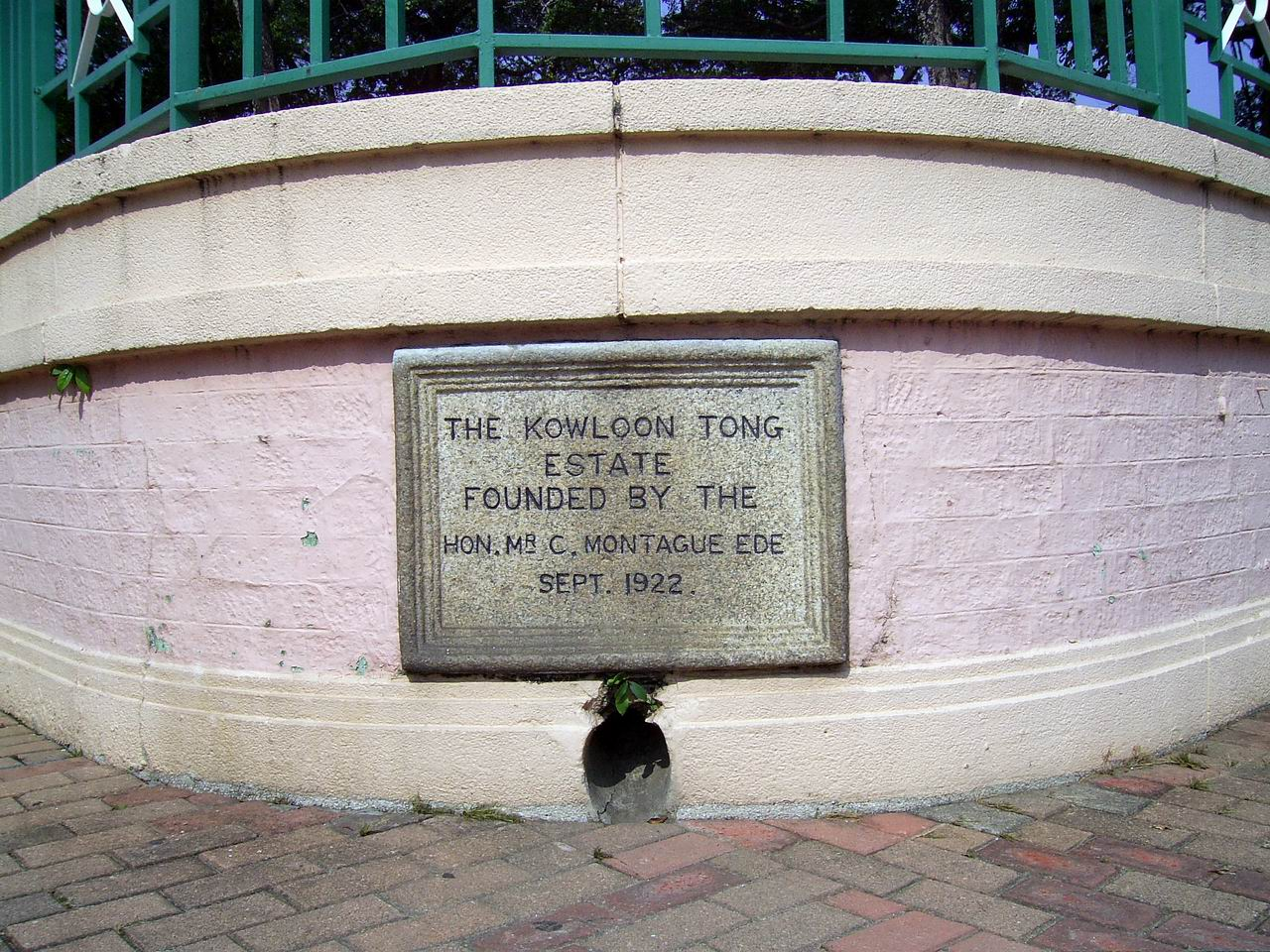
Charles Montague Ede's cornerstone stone at the Essex Crescent Rest Garden, Kowloon Tong.

Realising the poor housing conditions and soaring rents the Portuguese clerks were facing in Hong Kong, Ede proposed a scheme of establishing a Garden City on a large area of land at the back of Wong Nai Chung village known as "Cidades Cameons" project. Despite considerable opposition, Ede's proposal was approved by the Secretary of State however was eventually dropped and replaced by a block of residences developed by the Hongkong Land and Savings Society. After that, Ede turned his attention to Kowloon Tong and became general manager of the Kowloon Tong and New Territories Development Co.. The company spent $8,000,000 on the Kowloon Tong estate scheme of building 250 houses to relieve the pressing house storage. Ede Road in Kowloon Tong is named after him in memory of his contribution to the development of Kowloon Tong.

He also concerned about the labour relations in Hong Kong at the time when trade unionist movements were strong in the colony. He suggested a series of measures to prevent strikes, forming the Hong Kong Industrial Security Association and the project of building a trades building at Yau Ma Tei where there would be training facilities for the Chinese workers and an Association store, a restaurant, a hospital and a gymnasium.

== Death and family ==
Ede had been in bad health during his later years and became ill for weeks before his death and had to cancel his health trip to California. He died at about 10 o'clock at his residence Derrington, No. 8, Peak Road on 22 May 1925 at the age of 60. The funeral service was held in St. John's Cathedral at 5 o'clock on the same day. He left property in England and Hong Kong of net value of £185,775, £152,837 at Hong Kong and £32,938 in England. His wife and son returned to England on 30 June 1925 after Charles Montague Ede's death. Ede had a son and a daughter:

- Colonel Bertram Montague Ede, whose son Charles Richard Montague Ede (1921–2002), was the founder of the publishing house Folio Society.
- Violet Montague Ede, married Major Austen Morgan Rotheram, third son of E. Rotheram of Crossdrum, Oldcastle, Co. Meath, Ireland at St John's Cathedral on 12 April 1922.

Legislative Council of Hong Kong
Preceded by Edward Osborne	Unofficial Member; 1911	Succeeded by Edward Osborne
Preceded by Henry Edward Pollock	Unofficial Member; Representative for Justices of the Peace; 1913	Succeeded by Henry Edward Pollock
Preceded by Archibald Orr Lang	Unofficial Member; 1924	Succeeded by Archibald Orr Lang
Political offices
Preceded by Henry Edward Pollock	Unofficial Member of the Executive Council of Hong Kong; 1922	Succeeded by Henry Edward Pollock
Preceded by Catchick Paul Chater	Unofficial Member of the Executive Council of Hong Kong; 1924	Succeeded by Catchick Paul Chater
