= Wilfred Miller Vincent Koch =

British surgeon

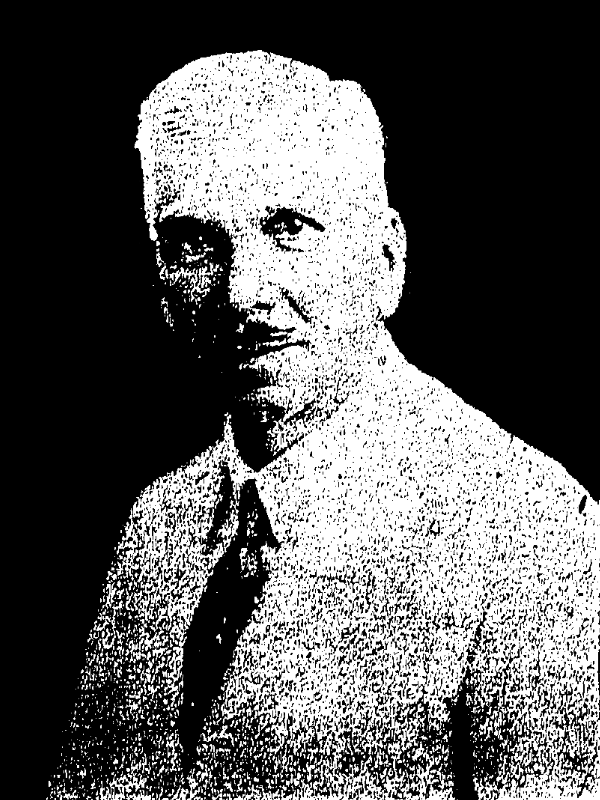
Koch in c. 1920s

Wilfred Miller Vincent Koch (29 October 1862 – 28 August 1939) was a British surgeon and member of the Legislative Council of Hong Kong.

== Biography ==
Koch was born on 29 October 1862 in Jaffna, Ceylon, son of Edwin Lawson Koch, descendant of Godfried Koch of Brandenburg Prussia and a respected doctor in Ceylon. Koch Sr. died suddenly in 1877 and the Ceylon public offered subscription to pay W. V. M. Koch's medical education in Britain. He was educated in St. Thomas' College, Ceylon and then graduated from the University of Edinburgh with an MB ChB in 1884 and MD in 1895.

After graduation worked as a medical officer in various hospitals in London and Sheffield from 1884 to 1888. In 1889, he joined the Colonial Medical Services and was sent to Trinidad between 1889 and 1903. He was an Army Major in command of the Trinidad Artillery.

Koch moved to Hong Kong in 1903 as a government doctor. In 1914, he was promoted to Superintendent of the Government Civil Hospital until he began his private practice in 1917. He was the Vice-President of the British Medical Association, Hong Kong Branch in 1907 to 1908. He was also a District Surgeon of the St John Ambulance Overseas Brigade. He was hired as lecturer in Surgery of the Hong Kong College of Medicine for Chinese which turned into the Medical Faculty of the University of Hong Kong in 1912. He was in the University Senate in 1912 and continued as a lecturer of the University until 1917.

He was member of the Sanitary Board from 1920 to 1931. He was appointed to the Legislative Council of Hong Kong in 1926 and Licensing Board in 1927.

He married three times first to Ida Nathan, then Ellen Elliot Drake Briscoe and finally Elsie M. Thompson.

Political offices
Preceded by Francis Bulmer Lyon Bowley	Member of the Sanitary Board; 1920–1931	Succeeded by Leonard Charles Fenton Bellamy
Legislative Council of Hong Kong
Preceded by Henry Edward Pollock	Unofficial Member for the Justices of the Peace; 1926	Succeeded by Henry Edward Pollock
