= Charles Stewart Sharp =

British businessman in Hong Kong

Charles Stewart Sharp JP was a British businessman in Hong Kong active in the early 1900s.

He worked with the Gibb, Livingston & Co., one of the leading mercantile firms in the colony and subsequently was elected as chairman of the Hong Kong General Chamber of Commerce in 1902. During his spell as chairman of the Chamber of Commerce, he held a committee meeting on the question of local currency on the gold standard and concluded that Hong Kong should stay in the course of silver basis as the colony's largest trading partner, China, remained on silver standard. China and Hong Kong did not abandon silver standard until 1935.

He was made Justice of the Peace in 1891. and was member of the Medical Board since 1901. He was part of the Committee of Inquiry into the Adequacy of the Staff of the Medical Department and the committee's report in 1901 recommended a scale of reform in the Medical Department.

He was appointed unofficial member of the Legislative Council for a six-year-term from 23 April 1902 but resigned in 1904. He notably helped amending the Public Health and Buildings Ordinance of 1903 during his time as the member of the legislature. He was also appointed as unofficial member of the Executive Council on 12 June 1902 during the absence of T. H. Whitehead.

== See also ==
- List of Executive Council of Hong Kong unofficial members 1896–1941

Legislative Council of Hong Kong
Preceded by John Thurburn	Unofficial Member; 1902–1904	Succeeded by Gershom Stewart
