= Arthur Rylands Lowe =

A. R. Lowe
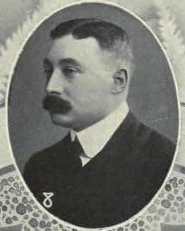

Unofficial Member of the Legislative Council of Hong Kong
- In office 6 May 1920 – 1920
- Appointed by: Sir Reginald Edward Stubbs
- Preceded by: Henry Edward Pollock
- Succeeded by: Henry Edward Pollock
- In office 12 May 1922 – 1922
- Appointed by: Sir Reginald Edward Stubbs
- Preceded by: Henry Edward Pollock
- Succeeded by: Henry Edward Pollock
- In office 30 October 1923 – 1923
- Appointed by: Sir Reginald Edward Stubbs
- Preceded by: Herbert William Bird
- Succeeded by: Herbert William Bird

Personal details
- Born: 22 June 1873 Manchester, United Kingdom
- Died: 31 May 1924 (aged 50) Hong Kong
- Education: Hulme Grammar School
- Occupation: Accountant businessman

Arthur Rylands Lowe (22 June 1873 – 31 May 1924) was a British accountant and the first full-time professional accountant in Hong Kong.

== Biography ==
Lowe was born on 22 June 1873 in Manchester. He was educated at the Hulme Grammar School and later joined Parkinson, Mather & Co., chartered accountants of Manchester and London. He moved to Hong Kong to join Butterfield & Swire in 1898. He resigned in 1902 to start up his own business.

On 2 June 1902, he became Hong Kong's first full-time professional accountant, and started the accountant firm that is today the Hong Kong office of PricewaterhouseCoopers. In 1903 he took fellow accountant J. E. Bingham as a partner. They established an office in Shanghai in 1906. When F. N. Matthews in Shanghai joined the partnership in 1908, the firm became known as Lowe, Bingham & Matthews. Under his leadership, its clients included the China Light and Power Co., Hongkong and Shanghai Bank, Hong Kong and Whampoa Dock, Jardine, Matheson & Co. and the Hong Kong and China Gas Co. Lowe was also a director of Hongkong and Shanghai Hotels, Ltc. and secretary of the Hong Kong General Chamber of Commerce for many years.

Lowe contested the Justice of the Peace election in 1920 for a seat in the Legislative Council of Hong Kong against T. F. Hough during the absence of H. E. Pollock. He was again appointed to the Legislative Council in July 1922 while H. W. Bird was on leave. Lowe was especially acquainted with financial matters in the Legislative Council and was involved in the discussions between the government and the Hong Kong Telephone Company over the renewal of the company's licence. He was also member of the Licensing Board and was made Justice of the Peace in March 1906.

Lowe was one of the leading members of the Royal Hong Kong Yacht Club and was the president of the Lawn Bowls Association of Hong Kong. He was also interested in pony racing. Lowe died from typhoid at 4:00 a.m. on 31 May 1924 at the Peak Hospital, aged 50.

Legislative Council of Hong Kong
Preceded by Henry Edward Pollock	Unofficial Member; Representative for Justices of the Peace; 1920	Succeeded by Henry Edward Pollock
Preceded by Henry Edward Pollock	Unofficial Member; Representative for Justices of the Peace; 1922	Succeeded by Henry Edward Pollock
Preceded by Herbert William Bird	Unofficial Member; 1923	Succeeded by Herbert William Bird
