= Ernest Hamilton Sharp =

Ernest Hamilton Sharp OBE, KC

Unofficial Member of the Executive Council of Hong Kong
- In office 1916–1922
- Appointed by: Sir Matthew Nathan
- Preceded by: E. A. Hewett
- Succeeded by: A. G. Stephen

Acting Attorney General for Hong Kong
- In office 1904–1905
- Appointed by: Frederick Lugard
- Preceded by: William Meigh Goodman
- Succeeded by: William Meigh Goodman

Personal details
- Born: 1861 United Kingdom
- Died: 9 February 1922 British Hong Kong
- Resting place: Protestant Cemetery, Happy Valley
- Spouse(s): Sarah, née Cunliffe
- Education: Lincoln College, Oxford; University of Hong Kong
- Occupation: Barrister

Ernest Hamilton Sharp, OBE, KC (1861 – 9 February 1922) was a barrister in Hong Kong.

== Education ==
He was educated at Lincoln College of the Oxford University and was called to the Bar of the Inner Temple in 1891. He practised in the Midland Circuit until he went to Hong Kong in 1894.

== Hong Kong ==
He was appointed as the King's Counsel for the colony of Hong Kong in July 1902. He had acted as the Attorney General for Hong Kong during the departure of William Meigh Goodman in 1904. Sharp was later appointed as unofficial member of the Executive Council from 1916 to 1922. As a barrister he practised at the Hong Kong Supreme Court until 1906 and practised at home before the Privy Council from 1906 to 1914. He returned to Hong Kong in late 1913.

During the First World War he was the chairman of the War Charities Executive Committee from 1915 to 1918, chairman of the Military Service Commission in 1918 and chairman of the General Military Service Tribunal in 1918. Sharp was honoured as the Officer of the Order of the British Empire in 1918 for his government and war services.

He was appointed chairman of the Commission of Inquiry into the finances of the University of Hong Kong in 1920. The recommendations of the commissions made some important changes and more satisfactory position of the university. He was rewarded the Legum Doctor honoris causa by the university in recognition of his service.

== Personal life ==
Sharp married Sarah Cunliffe, daughter of Roger Cunliffe, of Tunbridge Wells and had seven children. During his life in Hong Kong, he shared a residence with Colonial Secretary Dr. Claud Severn, and the deputy registrar of the Supreme Court C. A. D. Melbourne.

Sharp was also a Freemason and a member of the Apollo University Lodge, Oxford. He was also one of the founders of the Hong Kong University Lodge at its consecration in 1913.

== Death ==
Sharp died of chronic nephritis at the Peak Hospital on 9 February 1922. His funeral took place at the Hong Kong (Happy Valley) Cemetery, on the evening of the same day.

Legal offices
Preceded by William Meigh Goodman	Acting Attorney General of Hong Kong; 1904–1905	Succeeded by William Meigh Goodman
Political offices
Preceded by Edbert Ansgar Hewett	Unofficial Member of the Executive Council of Hong Kong; 1916–1922	Succeeded by Alexander Gordon Stephen
