= J. W. C. Bonnar =

Scottish businessman (1912-1935)

John Whyte Cooper Bonnar

Unofficial Member of the Legislative Council of Hong Kong
- In office 12 September 1912 – 19 December 1912
- Appointed by: Sir Francis Henry May
- Preceded by: Murray Stewart
- Succeeded by: Murray Stewart

Personal details
- Born: 1871
- Died: 26 November 1935 (aged 63–64) Hong Kong
- Occupation: Businessman; Broker

John Whyte Cooper Bonnar (1871 – 26 November 1935) was a Scottish businessman in Hong Kong and member of the Legislative Council of Hong Kong.

== Business career ==
Bonnar was born in 1871, and started his business career in Hong Kong at the Gibb, Livingston & Co. where he rose to the post of manager. He retired from business in the 1930s but later returned to Hong Kong and started business as an exchange broker.

He served on the General Committee of the Hong Kong General Chamber of Commerce for eight years from 1908 to 1916. He was also the vice-chairman of the chamber in 1914 and 1915. Bonnar represented the chamber of commerce on the Legislative Council during the absence of Murray Stewart from the colony. He also contested for the seat after Stewart's death. He was appointed unofficial Justice of the Peace in 1926.

== Personal life ==
Bonnar was a staunch churchgoer and was one of the trustees of the Peak Church. He was also a prominent Freemason. He was also a prominent member of the Royal Hong Kong Yacht Club and of the St. Andrew's Society, being the president in 1913 and 1914 and member of the general committee at the time he died. Bonnar was also president of the Hong Kong Football Club.

He died in his sleep at the night on 26 November 1935 at the Peak Hotel. On Saturday before he died, Bonnar played skip in the rink representing St. Andrew's Society against St. George's Society in annual match when he took the place of Dr. J. Macgown, president of the St. Andrew's Society.

The "A" fifteen Rugby game between the Hong Kong Football Club and an Army fifteen scheduled on the next day was cancelled as a mark of respect.

Bonnar was married in 1905 to a daughter of Rev. C. H. Hickling, former minister of the Union Church. His son J. M. Bonnar was a well-known Colony Interport Rugby player. His daughter was married to Lieutenant A. J. Ropes of the Royal Artillery.

Legislative Council of Hong Kong
| Preceded by Murray Stewart | Unofficial Member; Representative for Hong Kong General Chamber of Commerce; 1912 | Succeeded by Murray Stewart |
