= Henry Slade =

Henry Slade may refer to:

- Henry Slade (medium) (1835–1905), fraudulent medium
- Henry Slade (rugby union) (born 1993), English rugby union player
- Henry Adolphus Warre Slade (1869–1936), British businessman and member of the Legislative Council of Hong Kong

== See also ==
- Henri Hay De Slade (1893–1979), French World War I flying ace
