= John Johnstone (businessman) =

British businessman and rider (1881-1935)

John Johnstone (1881-1935) was a British businessman and rider. He was the tai-pan of the Jardine, Matheson & Co., member of the Shanghai Municipal Council and Legislative Council of Hong Kong.

He was the head of the Jardine, Matheson & Co. as well as director of numerous companies. He was member of the Shanghai Municipal Council and the Legislative Council of Hong Kong.

== Horse Riding ==
He was a keen rider and bore the reputation of being the best rider East of the Suez. He succeeded in winning the Jockey Cup on a pony named Ben-y-Gloe belonging to C. H. Ross, the former tai-pan of Jardines when he first went to Hong Kong in 1903. In 1904, he won the Professional Cup on a pony named Runaway Girl, purchased from W. A. Cruickshank. From 1903 to 1919, he rode in 1,178 races, winning 334, securing 192 seconds and 186 thirds, being unplaced 466 times, excluding the record of minor events such as Off Days or Gymkhanas. He won 14 Grand Nationals in China, and at one meeting in Hong Kong rode in 30 races winning 16 of them. He was also the President of the St. Andrew's Society.

He left Hong Kong on 31 March 1921 for home by the Empress of Asia.

In 1928 he won The Foxhunters Cup at Cheltenham riding Rathpatrick and officiated as steward at several of the northern meetings. He died at the Cheltenham meeting in 1935 where he was officiating.

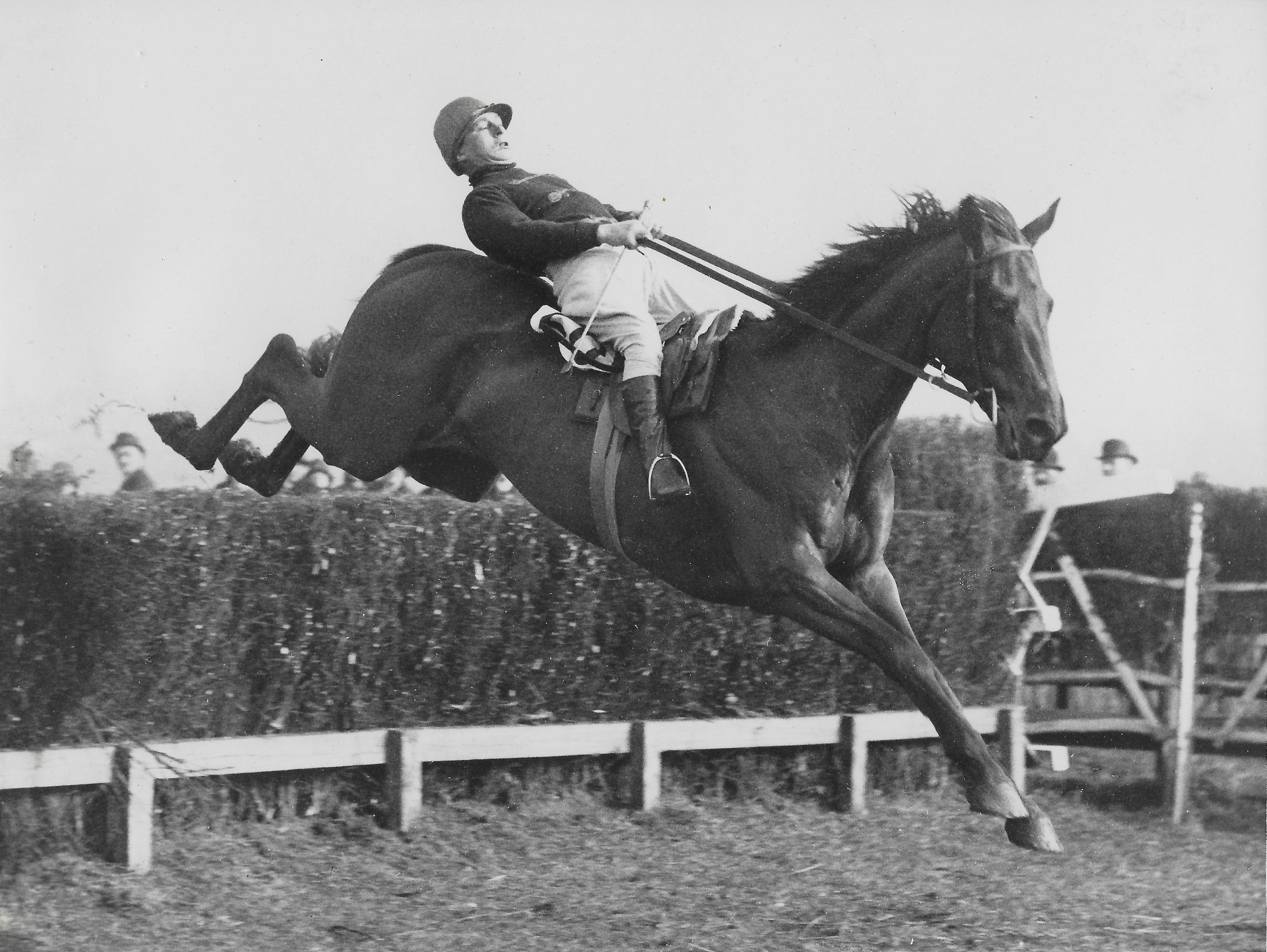
John Johnstone, Cheltenham circa 1923

Legislative Council of Hong Kong
| Preceded by David Landale | Unofficial Member; 1919–1921 | Succeeded by Alexander Gordon Stephen |
