= Marcus Theodore Johnson =

Marcus Theodore Johnson was a British businessman and member of the Legislative Council of Hong Kong.

Johnson joined the Hongkong and Shanghai Banking Corporation and was the Deputy Chairman of the bank in 1937. He was also Chairman of the Hong Kong Jockey Club from 1935 to 1939.

He was made Justice of the Peace and was appointed to the Legislative Council of Hong Kong during the Sir H. E. Pollock on leave in May 1936, and was appointed to the Legislative Council again in 1937 vice Arthur William Hughes's resignation.

Sporting positions
Preceded by Charles Gordon Stewart Mackie	Chairman of the Hong Kong Jockey Club; 1935–1939	Succeeded by Thomas Ernest Pearce
Legislative Council of Hong Kong
Preceded by Henry Edward Pollock	Unofficial Member; Representative for Justices of the Peace; 1936	Succeeded by Henry Edward Pollock
Preceded by Arthur William Hughes	Unofficial Member; Representative for Hong Kong General Chamber of Commerce; 1937–1938	Succeeded by Andrew Lusk Shields
