= Edward Victor David Parr =

British merchant (1870 – 1947)

Edward Victor David Parr, JP (22 May 1870 – 2 April 1947) was a British businessman and unofficial member of the Executive Council and Legislative Council of Hong Kong.

== Biography ==
Parr was born in Haslington, Cheshire. He first arrived in Hong Kong in 1896. After that he had been stationed Shanghai, Japan and India. He returned to Hong Kong and became head of many leading companies in Hong Kong. He was the acting superintendent of P&O in 1916. In 1920 he was elected by the directors as the chairman of the Hongkong & Shanghai Banking Corporation. He remained on the board until his resignation in 1924 on leaving Hong Kong.

He was active in the British business community and was made Justice of the Peace in April 1915. In January 1916, Parr signed a petition organised by Henry Pollock to the Secretary of State for the Colonies for constitution reform in Hong Kong. It demanded a larger increase of unofficial members in the Executive Council and also all unofficial members in the Legislative Council elected by the Hong Kong General Chamber of Commerce and unofficial Justices of Peace. He was member of the Hong Kong General Chamber of Commerce and when the Chamber moved for the exclusion of the German merchants after World War I in 1917 under the chairmanship of Percy Holyoak, he raised his support to the resolution and suggested to send their demand to the London government.

On 13 May 1919 he was elected by the committee to be the representative of the Chamber of Commerce in the Legislative Council during the absence of Percy Holyoak. He was temporarily again appointed by the Hong Kong government as to the Legislative Council in September 1919. He was appointed again to the Legislative Council in March 1920 and continued to serve until his resignation in 1923 In September 1920, he was appointed to the Executive Council as an unofficial member during Ernest Sharp was on leave.

He was also member of the Royal Hong Kong Golf Club and representative of the club on the Recreation Grounds Committee and had also been appointed to the Authorized Architects' Committee.

He died in Rusthall, Kent.

Legislative Council of Hong Kong
Preceded by Percy Hobson Holyoak	Unofficial Member; 1919	Succeeded by Percy Hobson Holyoak
Preceded by Stanley Hudson Dodwell	Unofficial Member; 1920–1923	Succeeded by Archibald Orr Lang
Political offices
Preceded by Ernest Hamilton Sharp	Unofficial Member of the Executive Council of Hong Kong; 1920	Succeeded by Ernest Hamilton Sharp
Business positions
Preceded by J Plummer	Chairman of the Hongkong and Shanghai Banking Corporation; 1920–1921	Succeeded by G Edkins
