= John Keith Bousfield =

British Army officer and businessman

- Born: 17 November 1893
- Died: 29 October 1945
- Occupation(s): Army officer, business executive, politician
- Known for: General manager of the Asiatic Petroleum Company and member of the Legislative Council of Hong Kong.

John Keith Bousfield, M.C. (17 November 1893 – 29 October 1945) was a British army officer, general manager of the Asiatic Petroleum Company and member of the Legislative Council of Hong Kong.

== Biography ==
He was the son of W. R. Bousfield, K.C., Member of Parliament (1892–1906). He was educated at Rugby School in Warwickshire, and Gonville and Caius College, Cambridge.

On the outbreak of the First World War, he was commissioned into the Royal Engineers in November 1914. He embarked for France in August 1915. In early 1917 he was attached as an observer to 57 Squadron of the Royal Flying Corps. He made a number of reconnaissance flights over German lines, but on 6 April 1917 his aircraft was brought down and he was taken prisoner of war. He was interned at Karlsruhe, Krefeld, Ströhen and later at Holzminden prisoner-of-war camp. On 24 July 1918, he and 28 other officers escaped from the Holzminden camp through a tunnel which had taken 10 months to dig. He made his way to the Dutch frontier in the clothes of a prisoner of war and then returned to England. He received the Military Cross from King George V at Windsor for his reconnaissance work during the Battle of Somme in 1916.

He later became the general manager of the Asiatic Petroleum Company and also the Asiatic Petroleum Co. (South China). He was appointed a member of the Legislative Council of Hong Kong in 1939 as the representative of the Hong Kong General Chamber of Commerce during the absence of A. L. Shields. He was vice-chairman of the chamber. He was elected chairman of the chamber in 1940.

Legislative Council of Hong Kong
Preceded by Andrew Lusk Shields	Unofficial Member; Representative for Hong Kong General Chamber of Commerce; 1939	Succeeded by Andrew Lusk Shields
