= Bendyshe Layton =

Bendyshe Layton (died 17 January 1918) was a British businessman and member of the Legislative Council of Hong Kong.

He was with the firm of Gibb, Livingston & Co., one of the leading trading firms in the East during the late nineteenth century. He later started his own business firm, Layton & Co., as a bill and bullion broker.

In 1888, he was nominated by the Hong Kong General Chamber of Commerce to sit temporarily in the Legislative Council during the absence of A. P. MacEwen.

He left Hong Kong in around 1913 or 1914 due to his health issue and lived in Britain until his death on 17 January 1918.

He had a son named G. B. Layton, who succeeded him as the head of the Layton & Co.

Legislative Council of Hong Kong
Preceded by A. P. MacEwen	Unofficial Member; Representative for Hong Kong General Chamber of Commerce; 1888–1889	Succeeded by A. P. MacEwen
