= Antonio Ferreira Batalha Silva-Netto =

Hong Kong Macanese businessman

Antonio Ferreira Batalha Silva-Netto (2 April 1876 – 15 December 1962) was a Hong Kong Macanese businessman and member of the Legislative Council of Hong Kong.

A. F. B. Silva-Netto was born on 2 April 1876. He was the son of Jose Silva-Netto and Honorina de Sousa of Macau. His father was born Jose Pedro Nolasco da Silva but changed his name to Jose Pedro Silva-Netto for commercial reasons.

He was appointed to the Legislative Council of Hong Kong in 1930 and 1936 during the absence of Jose Pedro Braga. He was also the President of Club Lusitano, a Portuguese elite club in Hong Kong.

He married Maria Celeste Jorge on 9 January 1902 in Hong Kong.

Legislative Council of Hong Kong
Preceded by Jose Pedro Braga	Unofficial Member; 1930	Succeeded by Jose Pedro Braga
Preceded by Jose Pedro Braga	Unofficial Member; 1936	Succeeded by Jose Pedro Braga
