= Henry Adolphus Warre Slade =

Henry Adolphus Warre Slade (17 January 1869 – 16 January 1936) was a British businessman and a member of the Legislative Council of Hong Kong.

Slade was born on 17 January 1869. He was the son of Reverend George FitzClarence Slade and Eleanor Frances Warre. He went to Hong Kong and became part of the Gilman & Co.. He was a member of the Legislative Council of Hong Kong from 1908 to 1909. He later returned to England and lived at Willards Hill in Etchingham, Sussex. His brother, Marcus Warre Slade (1865–1941), was a barrister and King's Counsel in Hong Kong. His other brother, Edmond Slade (1859–1928), was a Royal Navy admiral in Hong Kong.

He married Beatrice Isobel Hilda Gordon, daughter of David Alexander Gordon and Jane Lawrie Bell, on 1 November 1898. He had children named Gerald Gordon Slade (born 1899, a Royal Navy officer) and Maurice Gordon Slade (1902–1971).

He died on 6 or 16 January 1936 in England aged 66 or 67 and was buried at the St. Bartholomews Churchyard in Burwash, East Sussex, England.

Legislative Council of Hong Kong
Preceded by Edward Osborne	Unofficial Member; 1908–1909	Succeeded by Edward Osborne
