= Murray Stewart (businessman) =

- Born: 1865; United Kingdom
- Died: 1922 (aged 56–57); Belmont Sanatorium, California
- Occupation(s): Businessman, bullion trader
- Known for: Member of the Legislative Council of Hong Kong and notable resident of Hong Kong

Murray Stewart (1865–1922) was a British businessman and member of the Legislative Council of Hong Kong.

== Career ==
Stewart was a bullion broker of the Hongkong and Shanghai Banking Corporation. He joined the bank in London in 1887 and was sent to the Far East in 1890. He was stationed in Shanghai for three years, then moved to Tientsin and stayed in North China for three years, being in Peking during the First Sino-Japanese War. He went home in 1895 and returned to Hong Kong in April 1896. He remained with the bank until 1900, when he joined his brother, Gershom Stewart's Stewart Bros. firm and took over the connection established by Ross Anton. He retired from the company early in the First World War and was succeeded by H. B. L. Dowbiggin.

He was a member of the Legislative Council of Hong Kong at various times from 1908 to 1912. During the First World War, he was responsible for associating with the London organisation and superintending the distribution of sum of money placed at his disposal by the War Charities Committee. He also responsible for erecting the war memorial on the open space at Central, Hong Kong to become the Cenotaph today.

== Legacy and family ==
During his residence in Hong Kong, Stewart was volunteer of the Mounted Troop commanded by C. B. Ross. After his retirement, he was in London in connection with Five Power Loan Group and the Hongkong and Shanghai Bank.

He health began to fail in 1918 left Hong Kong to California in the spring of 1921, hoping the climate there would restore his health. He died at the Belmont Sanatorium in California in 1922 at aged 57. Tributes were paid by the member of the Legislative Council after his death. His brother, Gershom Stewart was also member of the Legislative Council and later became Member of Parliament for Wirral.

Legislative Council of Hong Kong
Preceded by Edbert Ansgar Hewett	Unofficial Member; Representative for Hong Kong General Chamber of Commerce; 1908	Succeeded by Edbert Ansgar Hewett
Preceded by Henry Edward Pollock	Unofficial Member; Representative for Justices of the Peace; 1909–1910	Succeeded by Henry Edward Pollock
Preceded by Edbert Ansgar Hewett	Unofficial Member; Representative for Hong Kong General Chamber of Commerce; 1912	Succeeded by Edbert Ansgar Hewett
