= Newton John Stabb =

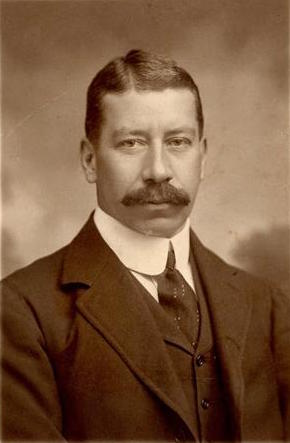

Chief Manager of the Hongkong and Shanghai Banking Corporation
- In office 1910–1920
- Preceded by: R. M. Smith
- Succeeded by: A. G. Stephen

Personal details
- Born: 1868 Canada
- Died: 1 December 1931 (aged 63) London, United Kingdom
- Resting place: Brookwood Cemetery
- Spouse: Ethel Mary Townsend
- Children: 5
- Education: Newton College
- Occupation: Banker

Newton John Stabb, OBE (15 December 1868 – 1 December 1931) was the chief manager of the Hongkong and Shanghai Banking Corporation between 1910 and 1920.

== Early life ==
He was born in 1868, the son of Nicolas Sparks Stabb. He studied at Newton College, Devon and arrived in East Asia in March 1891.

== Career ==
He joined the Singapore branch of the Hongkong and Shanghai Banking Corporation as a junior and transfer to Shanghai in 1895 and to Hong Kong in 1903. In 1906, he was appointed agent at Saigon and in 1909 he returned to London as sub-manager of the home office. He returned to Hong Kong in 1910 and was appointed acting chief manager and confirmed in 1910 until he returned to London and became the manager in the London branch in 1920.

During his years in Hong Kong, he was appointed to the Executive Council of Hong Kong in 1919. He was knighted in 1921 and awarded the Order of the British Empire. In 1927, he received the Order of the Sacred Treasure (Second Class) from the Japanese Emperor.

== Personal life ==
He married Ethel Mary Townsend, daughter of A. M. Townsend, former manager of the London branch and director of the London Board of the Hongkong and Shanghai Banking Corporation (HSBC). Stabb had two sons and three daughters. One son, Nicolas John Stabb, a pilot for the Royal Air Force Volunteer Reserve, was killed in 1942 during the Second World War.

Stabb's grave in Brookwood Cemetery

He died at the age of 63 in London on 1 December 1931 and was buried in Brookwood Cemetery in Woking.

Business positions
Preceded by R. M. Smith	Chief Manager of Hongkong and Shanghai Banking Corporation; 1910–1920	Succeeded by A. G. Stephen
