= Francis Parry =

British businessman in Hong Kong

Francis Parry F.R.G.S. was a British businessman in China and member of the Legislative Council of Hong Kong.

Parry was a member of the Birley & Co. He was elected as Trustees for the Year 1865–66, 1866–67, 1867–68 by the Seatholders of the St. John's Cathedral, Hong Kong. He was appointed member of the Legislative Council vice Hugh Bold Gibb's absence on leave in July 1867.

He married Jane, widow of Rev. James Gwynne, Rector of Cork, and daughter of the late Charles Osburn, Fareham, Hampshire.

Legislative Council of Hong Kong
Preceded by Hugh Bold Gibb	Unofficial Member; 1867–1868	Succeeded by J. P. Duncanson
