= Charles Ede =

- Born: Charles Richard Montague Ede; 22 October 1921; Sevenoaks, England
- Died: 29 May 2002 (aged 80); Hampshire, England
- Known for: Founding The Folio Society

Charles Richard Montague Ede (22 October 1921 – 29 May 2002) was a British publisher and dealer in art and antiquities. He founded the Folio Society in 1947.

== Early life ==
Ede was born at Dean Lodge, Sevenoaks, Kent, the eldest son of Colonel Bertram Montague Ede, a soldier and farmer. He was a grandson of Charles Montague Ede, a Hong Kong businessman. His father was later head of the MI5 outpost on Malta during the Second World War.

Ede was educated at the Imperial Service College, where a schoolmaster introduced him to the work of William Morris, the founder of the Kelmscott Press. He had a place to go up to Balliol College, Oxford, in October 1939, but war was declared in September, and instead he went to France as a driver in the Royal Army Service Corps, delivering spares and supplies to units of the British Expeditionary Force. He was evacuated from Brest twelve days after the end of the Dunkirk evacuation in June 1940, trained as an army officer, and was commissioned into the Royal Tank Regiment. He saw service at the Siege of Malta, in Mandatory Palestine, Egypt, and Italy, and then transferred to the Intelligence Corps.

== Career ==
After the War, instead of going up to Oxford, as he had planned, Ede completed a course at the London School of Printing. In 1947, inspired by the Kelmscott Press, with the help of Alan Bott, founder of the Book Trust and Pan Books, and Christopher Sandford, who owned the Golden Cockerel Press, Ede founded the Folio Society, a publisher of high-quality illustrated books, mostly well-known works. Its stated aim was to offer "editions of the world's great literature, in a format worthy of the contents, at a price within the reach of everyman." Only three volumes appeared in 1947, Tolstoy's Tales, George du Maurier's Trilby, and Aucassin and Nicolette, but the aim of publishing a book a month was eventually achieved.

In the 1960s, Ede launched a further business, Folio Fine Art, which sold watercolours, maps and prints, autograph letters, fine bindings, and antiquities by mail-order.

In 1971, Ede sold his share in the Folio Society and set himself up as a dealer in ancient art. The firm he founded, Charles Ede Ltd, is still in existence, with a gallery in Mayfair and a presence at international art fairs, under the direction of Charis Tyndall and James Richards.

== Personal life ==
In 1947, Ede married Elizabeth Craze, and they had four sons and two daughters. Their youngest son succeeded him as managing director of Charles Ede Ltd. when he stood down in 1986.

== Selected publications ==
- The Art of the Book: Some Record of Work Carried Out in Europe and the U.S.A. 1939-1950. London: Studio Publications, 1951.
- Collecting Antiquities: An Introductory Guide. London; Dent, 1976. ISBN 0-460-04240-8
