= Constitutional Reform Association of Hong Kong =

- President: Henry Pollock
- Vice-President: P. H. Holyoak
- Founded: 3 May 1917
- Dissolved: October 1923

The Constitutional Reform Association of Hong Kong was a political group formed by expatriate British community striving for constitutional reform in Hong Kong in the late 1910s.

== History ==
It was first launched in a well-attended meeting at the Theatre Royal on 3 May 1917 by the Hong Kong General Chamber of Commerce. It submitted a proposal of introducing unofficial majority in the Legislative Council of Hong Kong to the House of Commons of the United Kingdom through member of parliament Colonel John Ward but was rejected by the Colonial Office in 1920.

On 9 January 1919, a resolution was passed at its public meeting for an unofficial majority in the Legislative Council, and for seven members elected, one each by the Hong Kong General Chamber of Commerce, the Justices of Peace, the Chinese Chamber of Commerce and four (one Portuguese and three British) by British subjects on the jurors list.

Governor Reginald Stubbs commented the Association in 1920 as a "farcical body", when the Association consisted of a few dozen persons, most of whom took no part in the proceedings and appeared to be moribund. By October 1923, the Constitutional Reform Association ceased to exist. An article in South China Morning Post said "[t]he strike and boycott of 1925 finally killed (temporarily at least) the Constitutional Reform movement. Its champions were sobered by visions of the dangers attaching to any relaxation of Official control."

In 1929, the new Governor Cecil Clementi agreed to add four new seats to the Legislative Council, two each for official and unofficial member, which was seen as a liberal move by the press.
