= Chan Kai-ming =

Hong Kong businessman

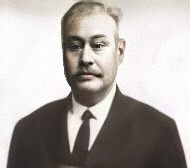

Chan Kai-ming (陳啟明, George Bartou Tyson; 1859 – 11 December 1919) was a Hong Kong businessman and member of the Sanitary Board and the Legislative Council of Hong Kong.

== Biography ==
Chan Kai Ming was born in Hong Kong in 1859 and was part of the first generation of Eurasians who went on to become important leaders of the Chinese community. His father was George Tyson, an American businessman from Massachusetts.

Educated at the Diocesan Boys' School and the Government Central School (now Queen's College), he became a Morrison scholar and worked as a pupil teacher after graduation. He was later appointed third clerk in the Magistracy and received a small pension from the Hong Kong government.

Chan Kai Ming's career began to prosper when he joined the opium farms that existed then in Hong Kong, later becoming managing director of the Tai Yau Opium Farm. By the time the government took over the monopoly, Chan had become a millionaire. At the time of his death, he was managing director of Gande, Price & Co., partner of Tai Yau Bank, director of the East Asia Bank, Chung Kwong Co. and Hong Kong Mercantile Co. and was one of the richest men in Hong Kong.

He was appointed member of the District Watchmen's Committee and was a member of the Permanent Chinese Cemetery Committee in Aberdeen, as well as the Chinese Public Dispensaries Committee.

He also served as Vice-Chairman of the Chinese General Chamber of Commerce, Chairman of the Tung Wah Hospital, director of the Po Leung Kuk charity and member of the Court of the University of Hong Kong, with several university scholarships bearing his name.

Appointed a Justice of the Peace, he was subsequently appointed Sanitary Board member in April 1912 for three terms, becoming the senior unofficial member until his death in 1919.

In 1918, he served as acting member of the Legislative Council of Hong Kong in place of Lau Chu-pak, who was on leave.

After the First World War, he was a member of the general committee overseeing Peace Celebrations in the colony.

Towards the end of his life, Chan Kai Ming suffered from a heart condition. While on holiday in Peking at the suggestion of his doctor, he caught a cold and died at his residence at 16 Caine Road on 11 December 1919, leaving five daughters and two sons.

Government offices
| Preceded by Lau Chu-pak | Member of the Sanitary Board; 1912–1919 | Succeeded by Chow Shou-son |
Legislative Council of Hong Kong
| Preceded by Lau Chu-pak | Chinese Unofficial Member; 1918 | Succeeded by Lau Chu-pak |
