= James Pender Duncanson =

British businessman (died 1870)

- Died: 21 January 1870
- Occupation: Businessman

James Pender Duncanson (died 21 January 1870) was a British merchant in Hong Kong and member of the Legislative Council of Hong Kong.

Duncanson was member of the trading firm Gibb, Livingston & Co. He was made Justice of the Peace in August 1867 and member of the Legislative Council of Hong Kong in May 1868 when vice Francis Parry resigned.

He died in 1870 in Hong Kong.

Legislative Council of Hong Kong
Preceded by Francis Parry	Unofficial Member; 1868	Succeeded by Hugh Bold Gibb
