= George William Forbes Playfair =

George William Forbes Playfair (1852 – 16 May 1918) was a British businessman and member of the Legislative Council of Hong Kong.

== Biography ==
G. W. F. Playfair was born in Waltair, India in 1852. He was the Manager of the National Bank of China. Together with C. Ewens, a prominent Hong Kong solicitor, and A.G. Ward, owner of a local printing firm, they formed a board of the new established South China Morning Post, a local English newspaper, which the managing director was Alfred Cunningham, who was also the managing editor of the Hong Kong Daily Press at the time. The South China Morning Post Company was established in January, 1903 at 15, 16, and 17 Connaught Road. In 1902, he was also member of the Legislative Council of Hong Kong as representative of the Justices of the Peace during the absence of Paul Chater.

He lived at "St. Andrews" on the Peak Road with his wife Florence Emily Isabel Edward. They had two children, Kenneth (born 1891) and Nancy (born 1894). He died in Kelvedon, Essex, England on 16 May 1918 at aged 67.

Legislative Council of Hong Kong
| Preceded by Catchick Paul Chater | Unofficial Member for the Justices of the Peace; 1902 | Succeeded by Catchick Paul Chater |
