= Alexander Palmer MacEwen =

British businessman and politician (1846–1919)

Alexander Palmer MacEwen (1846–1919) was a British businessman in China and member of the Legislative Council of Hong Kong.

== Biography ==
MacEwen was head of the Holiday, Wise & Co., agent and member on the consulting committee of the Hongkong and Shanghai Bank, Jardine, Matheson & Co. and Union Insurance Society of Canton. He was also vice-chairman of the Hong Kong General Chamber of Commerce. member of the Legislative Council of Hong Kong as the representative of the chamber in April 1886 during the absence of Thomas Jackson, and from 1887 after Jackson's retirement until 1890 when left for England.

He had advocated for the establishment of a municipal council, letting the local community to manage their own affairs, and also an unofficial majority in the Legislative Council for many years. The suggestions were later taken by the Petitioners, consisting of many local business leaders, to the Colonial Office in 1893 and was eventually rejected by Lord Ripon, the then Secretary of State for the Colonies.

During his stay in Hong Kong, he was also President of the Victoria Recreation Club and member of the Hong Kong Golf Club.

He later moved to Shanghai and became Chairman of the Shanghai General Chamber of Commerce and also member of the Watch and Defence Committee of the Shanghai Municipal Council until he returned to Hong Kong in 1896.

In 1902, he was elected vice-president of the Hastings and St. Leonards Conservative Association. He returned to England to take the office at Hollington in Sussex.

His daughter, Mary Ethel Winifred MacEwen married Sir Sidney Barton.

Business positions
| Preceded by Wilhlem Reiners | Chairman of the Hongkong and Shanghai Banking Corporation; 1883–1885 | Succeeded by Frederick David Sassoon |
Legislative Council of Hong Kong
| Preceded by Thomas Jackson | Unofficial Member; Representative for Hong Kong General Chamber of Commerce; 1886–1890 | Succeeded by T. H. Whitehead |
