= Arthur Lowe (footballer) =

Australian rules footballer, born 1906

Personal information
- Full name: Arthur Lowe
- Born: 8 January 1906
- Died: 29 December 1950 (aged 44)
- Height: 173 cm (5 ft 8 in)
- Weight: 73 kg (161 lb)

Playing career^{1}
Years	Club	Games (Goals)
1927–1929	North Melbourne	41 (2)
- ^{1} Playing statistics correct to the end of 1929.

Arthur Lowe (8 January 1906 – 29 December 1950) was an Australian rules footballer who played for the North Melbourne Football Club in the Victorian Football League (VFL).
