= Charles Edward Anton =

Charles Edward Anton (1860 – 16 November 1935) was a Scottish businessman who was the 16th tai-pan of the Jardine, Matheson & Co. and a member of the Legislative Council of Hong Kong.

== Biography ==
Anton was born in St Pancras, London, to Scottish parents George Anton, a merchant, and Mary Lindsay. He joined the Jardine, Matheson & Co. in 1884 and spent some time in the Shanghai office. He was authorised to sign per pro in 1904. In 1910, he was appointed a director and eventually retired in 1919. During 1917 when he was the director of Jardine he was also member of the Hong Kong General Chamber of Commerce and the Legislative Council of Hong Kong.

Anton died of pneumonia at Broughty Ferry, Dundee, Scotland on 16 November 1935, leaving local estate sworn under £225,500 (£19.8 million as of 2023).

== Legacy ==
Anton Street (Chinese: 晏頓街) in Wan Chai was named after him.

Legislative Council of Hong Kong
Preceded by David Landale	Unofficial Member; 1916	Succeeded by David Landale
