= Henry Gollan =

Chief Justice of Hong Kong

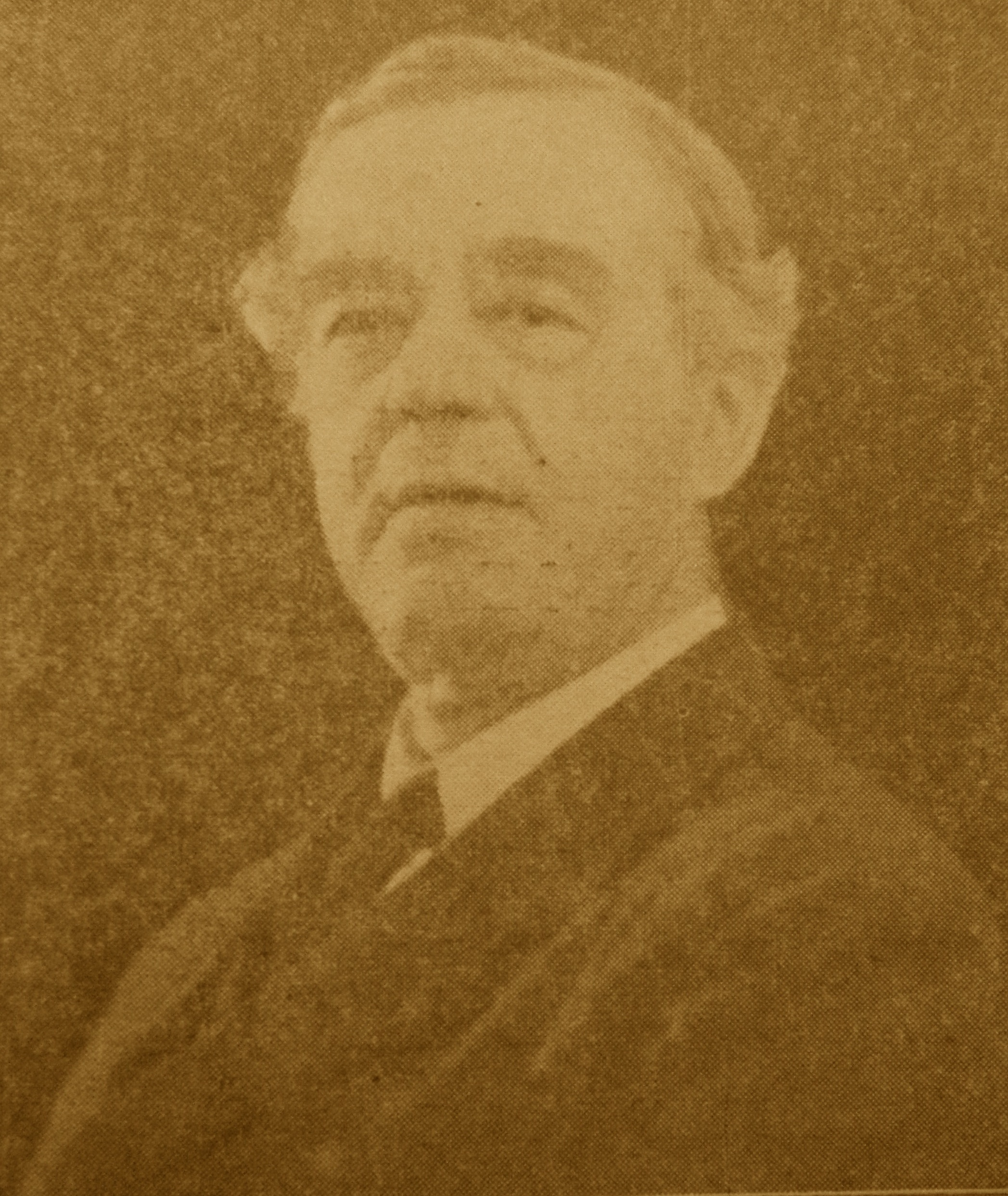

12th Attorney General of Ceylon
- In office 15 October 1918 – 1924
- Governor: William Manning
- Preceded by: Anton Bertram
- Succeeded by: Lancelot Henry Elphinstone

Chief Justice of Hong Kong
- In office 1924–1930
- Preceded by: Sir William Rees-Davies
- Succeeded by: Sir Joseph Horsford Kemp

Personal details
- Born: 8 January 1868 Coquimbo, Chile
- Died: 5 August 1949 (aged 81)

Sir Henry Cowper Gollan CBE KC (8 January 1868 – 5 August 1949) was a British lawyer and judge. He served as attorney general and chief justice of a number of British colonies in the early 20th century. His last position before retirement was as Chief Justice of Hong Kong.

== Early life ==
Gollan was born on 8 January 1868 in Coquimbo, Chile. He was the son of Sir Alexander Gollan, K.C.M.G., a British diplomat.

He was educated at Charterhouse School. He obtained his Master of Arts degree from the University of Edinburgh in 1887 and was called to the bar by the Middle Temple in January 1891. He joined the Northern Circuit and later practised in London.

In 1899 he was appointed private secretary to Sir Frederick Lugard. Lugard was made High Commissioner of the Northern Nigeria Protectorate in 1900.

== Legal appointments ==
In 1900, presumably on Lugard's recommendation, Gollan was appointed attorney-general and later chief justice of Northern Nigeria in 1901. While in Northern Nigeria, he was instrumental in drafting a new criminal code based on the Queensland Criminal Code. He wrote at the time:

"The Queensland Code appeared to me to keep in a much more satisfactory manner than any of the other Codes I have mentioned the mean between over elaboration on the one hand and over compression on the other . . ."

In 1904 he was appointed Chief Justice of Bermuda and in that capacity served as President of the Legislative Council. In Bermuda, he also worked on the development of a Criminal Code again modelled on the Queensland Code.

In 1911, he was appointed Attorney-General of Trinidad and in 1918 the Attorney-General of Ceylon (now Sri Lanka).

Gollan was appointed a King's Counsel twice, the first time in Trinidad and Tobago in 1911 and, the second time, in Ceylon in 1919.

He was knighted in 1921 whilst attorney general of Ceylon.

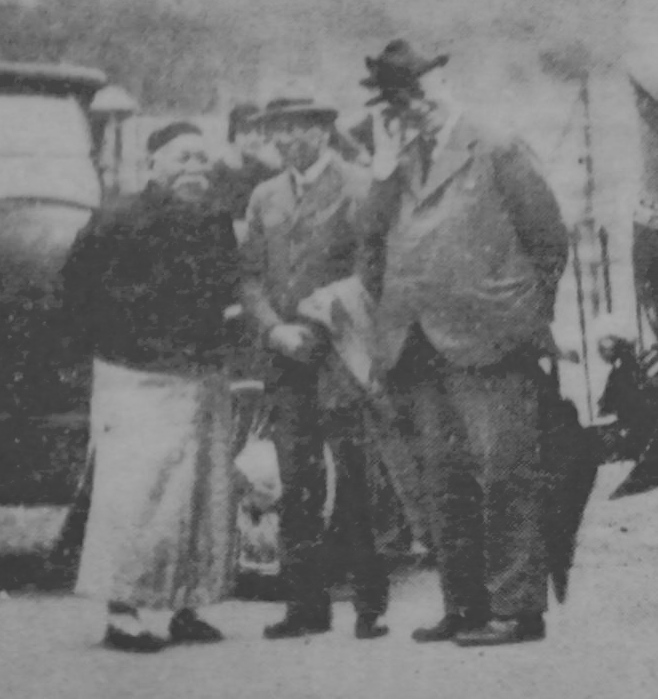
Shouson Chow, Justice John Wood and Gollan in 1929 at the funeral of Mr H. P. White

In 1924, he was appointed Chief Justice of Hong Kong replacing Sir William Rees-Davies. In that capacity he served on a Special Commission of Judges in Shanghai made up of Gollan, Justice Finley Johnson (presiding) of the Philippines and Justice Kisaburo Suga of the Hiroshima Court of Appeal to inquire into the killings of Chinese protesters on 30 May 1925 in Shanghai that triggered the May 30 Movement.

From 1926, in his capacity as Chief Justice of Hong Kong, he also sat as a member of the full court of the British Supreme Court for China in Shanghai.

== Retirement ==
Gollan retired to England in 1930. On his retirement, he was granted an honorary Doctor of Laws by the University of Hong Kong.

He died on 5 August 1949.

Legal offices
| Preceded by Sir William Rees-Davies | Chief Justice of Hong Kong; 1924–1930 | Succeeded by Sir Joseph Horsford Kemp |
| Preceded by Anton Bertram | Attorney General of Ceylon; 1918–1924 | Succeeded by Lancelot Henry Elphinstone |
