= James McKie (businessman) =

Scottish businessman

James McKie (30 June 1859 – 17 March 1910) was a Scottish businessman of the Jardine, Matheson and Co.

== Biography ==
McKie was born on 30 June 1859 at Erskine, Renfrewshire, a village where his father was minister of the Church of Scotland. He was enrolled as a pupil of the Manchester Grammar School. After graduation, he joined the Jardine, Matheson and Co. and worked in Shanghai until his death.

He was an advocate of the industrial development of China by the aid of railways and the introduction of modern machinery. He was a founding member of the Board of Commissioners of the Shanghai–Nanking Railway. He was also member of the General Committee of the Shanghai Chamber of Commerce and President of the St. Andrew's Society.

McKie was enthusiastic in swimming, rowing, fishing, waterfowl-shooting. He co-founded the Shanghai Rowing Club and rowed No. 5 in the Scottish Eight which used to be held on the Soowchow Creek between the Cantonese Cemetery and the Markham Road Bridge. He was also good at cricket and golf. He had no relatives in China but had an early schoolmate and a lifelong friend, W. C. Murray.

McKie had an affection in the liver and began to ail from the mid January 1910. After a prolonged struggle, he died at 6:20 p.m. on 17 March at the Shanghai General Hospital. The flags of the Shanghai Club, Cricket, Rowing and Recreation Clubs and all other clubs which McKie was a member of, as well as the steamers of the Indo-China Fleet in port were all flown at half mast. He was buried in the Old Cemetery at Pahsienjao.
