= A. G. Stephen =

Alexander Gordon Stephen
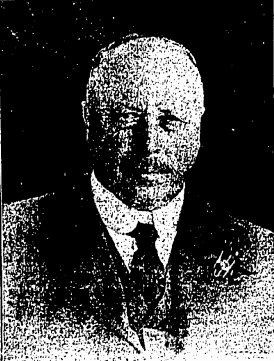

Unofficial Member of the Executive Council of Hong Kong
- In office 31 October 1921 – 27 August 1924
- Appointed by: Sir Reginald Edward Stubbs
- Preceded by: Ernest Hamilton Sharp
- Succeeded by: Percy Hobson Holyoak

Unofficial Member of the Legislative Council of Hong Kong
- In office 5 April 1921 – 14 June 1923
- Appointed by: Sir Reginald Edward Stubbs
- Preceded by: John Johnstone
- Succeeded by: Herbert William Bird

Personal details
- Born: 14 September 1862 Banff, Aberdeenshire, Scotland
- Died: 27 August 1924 (aged 61) London, England
- Resting place: Kensal Green Cemetery
- Occupation: Banker

Alexander Gordon Stephen, JP (14 September 1862 – 27 August 1924) was the chief manager of the Hongkong and Shanghai Banking Corporation.

== Biography ==
He was born in Banff, Aberdeenshire on 14 September 1862. After he served an apprenticeship at the Town and Country Bank in Aberdeen, he joined the London office of the Hongkong and Shanghai Banking Corporation in 1882. He arrived in Hong Kong on 27 August 1885. He was transferred to Batavia, Singapore and the Bombay office, and stationed in Batavia from 1896 to 1902 until he was appointed agent at Penang. He became manager in the Manila branch and undertook a tour of inspection of the North China branches. He was then appointed manager in Shanghai in 1912 and acted as chief manager in Hong Kong for a few months during the absence of Newton John Stabb in London. He subsequently returned to Shanghai as a manager until he succeeded as chief manager on the retirement of Newton John Stabb in 1920.

He held many public offices in Hong Kong. He was appointed as an unofficial member of the Executive Council and Legislative Council and made a Justice of Peace in 1921. He was a member of both Court and Council of the University of Hong Kong. He was also a member of the general committee of the Hong Kong General Chamber of Commerce and a steward of the Hong Kong Jockey Club with Stephen and Stitt.

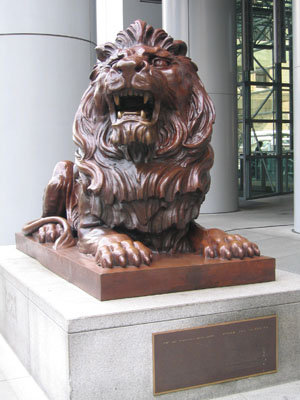
Left Lion Stephen at the HSBC Building in Hong Kong

Leaving in May 1924 for London due to illness, he died from pneumonia due to infarct of the lung at a London nursing home at the night of 27 August. The funeral took place on 2 September at the Kensal Green Cemetery.

HSBC's principal offices, including the HSBC Main Building in Hong Kong, the former office in Shanghai, and the current global headquarters in London, all feature a pair of bronze lions. The first of these, in Shanghai, were commissioned by Stephen and inspired by his visit to the Venetian Arsenal. By tradition, the lion on the left in each of these pairs is depicted roaring and is named "Stephen" in memory of Alexander Gordon Stephen. (The right hand lion is named "Stitt", after G H Stitt, Stephen's successor as Manager Shanghai.)

Business positions
Preceded by Newton J. Stabb	Chief Manager of the Hongkong and Shanghai Banking Corporation; 1920–1924	Succeeded by A. H. Barlow
Legislative Council of Hong Kong
Preceded by John Johnstone	Unofficial Member; 1921–1923	Succeeded by Herbert William Bird
Political offices
Preceded by Ernest Hamilton Sharp	Unofficial Member of the Executive Council of Hong Kong; 1921–1924	Succeeded by Percy Hobson Holyoak
