= Andrew Lusk Shields =

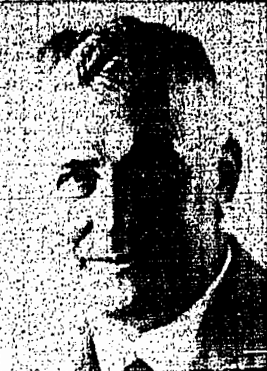

Unofficial Member of the Executive Council of Hong Kong
- In office 8 July 1941 – 25 December 1941
- Appointed by: Sir Mark Young
- Preceded by: S. H. Dodwell

Unofficial Member of the Legislative Council of Hong Kong
- In office 29 April 1938 – 25 December 1941
- Appointed by: Sir Geoffry Northcote
- Preceded by: M. T. Johnson

Chairman of the Hongkong & Shanghai Banking Corporation
- In office February 1939 – February 1940
- Preceded by: Thomas Ernest Pearce
- Succeeded by: H. V. Wikinson

Personal details
- Born: c. 1882
- Died: 24 July 1944 (aged 62) Occupied territory of Hong Kong
- Occupation: Businessman

Andrew Lusk Shields (c. 1882 – 24 July 1944) was a Scottish businessman and politician in Hong Kong. He died as a prisoner of war following the surrender of Hong Kong in 1941.

== Life ==
Shields was born in about 1882. He joined Shewan, Tomes & Co. and succeeded Robert Shewan as a partner of the firm. He was also chairman of the Sandakan Light and Power Co. and had been on the board of directors of the Hongkong and Shanghai Banking Corporation. He was elected chairman of the Hong Kong General Chamber of Commerce in 1938.

He was an unofficial member of the Legislative Council from 1938 to 1941 as representative of the Chamber of Commerce and was appointed to the Executive Council in April 1941. During his time on the Legislative Council, taxation was hotly debated. Shields, representing the Chamber of Commerce's interest, opposed the government's Income Tax Bill for the raising of revenue for war.

Shields was a keen sailor. He was the commodore of the Royal Hong Kong Yacht Club between 1927 and 1928, and was elected again in 1932, serving until 1936. He was also appointed honorary commander of the Hong Kong Naval Volunteer Force in January 1934. He was a member of the Hong Kong Naval Volunteer Advisory Committee.

Shields was also president of the St. Andrew's Society, a club for Scotsmen in Hong Kong, in 1932 and elected chief-captain in 1933.

He held public offices including, among others, member of the Volunteer Advisory Committee and Appeal Tribunal under the Compulsory Service Ordinance, and acted as a member of the Authorized Architects Consulting Committee, the Shipping Control Board, and as the chairman of the Essential Commodities Board during the absence of Stanley Hudson Dodwell.

During the Battle of Hong Kong, he was escorted through the Japanese lines from the Repulse Bay Hotel and gave Major-General Christopher Maltby an account of the Japanese forces and equipment. He tried to persuade Maltby to surrender but Maltby decided to fight on. Hong Kong finally surrendered on 25 December 1941 which is now referred to as "Black Christmas".

Shields became a prisoner of war and died at the Stanley Internment Camp on 24 July 1944 at the age of 62. His wife was repatriated with the Canadians.

Legislative Council of Hong Kong
Preceded by Marcus Theodore Johnson	Unofficial Member; Representative for Hong Kong General Chamber of Commerce; 1938–1941	Vacant Japanese occupation of Hong Kong
Business positions
Preceded by Thomas Ernest Pearce	Chairman of the Hongkong and Shanghai Banking Corporation; 1939–1940	Succeeded by H. V. Wikinson
Political offices
Preceded by Stanley Hudson Dodwell	Unofficial Member of the Executive Council of Hong Kong; 1941	Vacant Japanese occupation of Hong Kong
