= Joseph Horsford Kemp =

Chief Justice of Hong Kong

Sir Joseph Kemp CBE, KC
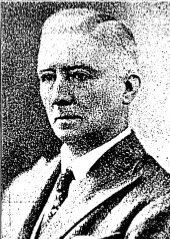

Secretary for Justice of Hong Kong
- In office 1914–1930
- Preceded by: John Alexander Strachey Bucknill
- Succeeded by: C. Grenville Alabaster

Chief Justice of Hong Kong
- In office 1930–1934
- Preceded by: Henry Gollan
- Succeeded by: Atholl MacGregor

Personal details
- Born: 23 December 1874 Drogheda, County Louth, Ireland
- Died: 16 September 1950 (aged 75) Sutton, London, UK

Sir Joseph Horsford Kemp, CBE, KC (1874-1950) was an Anglo-Irish lawyer and judge. He served as Attorney General and Chief Justice of Hong Kong in the early 1930s.

== Early life ==
Kemp was born in Drogheda, Ireland on 23 December 1874. He was educated at the High School, Dublin, Ireland, and Cape University, South Africa. He commenced studying for a Bachelor of Laws at London University.

In 1898, he sat for an Eastern cadetship and the same year he went to Hong Kong as a cadet in Hong Kong Service of the Colonial Office, having scored the highest marks in the competitive examinations.

== Legal appointments ==
In 1904, Kemp was appointed Registrar of the Land Court in Hong Kong and in 1904, Registrar of the Supreme Court of Hong Kong. He was called to the bar of Lincoln's Inn in 1911 and became Crown Solicitor in Hong Kong. In 1913, he was appointed a puisne judge of the Supreme Court of Hong Kong. Two years later, in 1915 he was appointed Attorney General of Hong Kong a position he held until 1930. In this position he was also a member of the Hong Kong Legislative Council.

He was appointed a King's Counsel in 1918. He was made a CBE, in the same year. Kemp was knighted in 1927.

In 1930, he was appointed Chief Justice of Hong Kong replacing Sir Henry Gollan. The appointment was in line with long-term practice in British Hong Kong of assigning administrative officers to serve in the local judiciary.

In his capacity as Chief Justice of Hong Kong, he also sat as a member of the full court of the British Supreme Court for China in Shanghai.

== Retirement ==
Kemp retired to England in 1933. On his retirement, he was granted an honorary Doctor of Laws by the University of Hong Kong

He died on 13 September 1950 at his home in Sutton, Surrey.

Legal offices
Preceded by John Alexander Strachey Bucknill	Attorney General of Hong Kong; 1915–1930	Succeeded by C. Grenville Alabaster
Preceded by Sir Henry Gollan	Chief Justice of Hong Kong; 1930–1934	Succeeded by Sir Atholl MacGregor
