= Charles Henderson Ross =

Scottish businessman

Charles Henderson Ross (23 July 1864 – 23 November 1919) was a Scottish businessman. He was a former tai-pan of Jardine, Matheson & Co. and member of the Legislative Council of Hong Kong.

== Biography ==
Ross was born on 23 July 1864. He was the son of Captain Horatio Ross of Rossie and Christian Henderson (d. 1892), daughter of East Indies merchant Charles Paton Henderson of Manchester. He spent many years in the East, first in India and later in Tianjin and Shanghai. He volunteered during the Boxer Rebellion in Tianjin under the command of General Alfred Gaselee, the commander of the British troops sent to the relief of Beijing, and was awarded the Boxer medal with two bars. He also served in the Shanghai light horse and was the head of the old Hong Kong mounted troop.

Ross joined Jardine, Matheson & Co., the biggest trading firm in the Far East at the time. He moved to Hong Kong in 1910 and was appointed by Henry Keswick as his substitute for all the purposes set out in a power of attorney of 5 September 1912. He was also a member of the Legislative Council of Hong Kong during Henry Keswick's leave of absence from 1911 to 1913.

He was a Director of the Hongkong and Shanghai Bank and the Peak Tramways, Chairman of the Whampoa Dock Co. and the Hongkong and Kowloon Wharf Co., member of the Green Island Cement Co., Chairman of the Land Investment Agency and a Director of the Land Reclamation and the West Point Building Companies. He was particularly interested in various sugar, cotton, ice, insurance, and machinery companies for which Jardine Matheson were agents.

He helped found the Hong Kong Scouts Company and took charge of the training of the Scouts in the New Territories. He was also a Steward of the Hong Kong Jockey Club. He served as treasurer of the Coronation Fund, was prominently connected with the Horticultural Society's exhibition and donated land for a tennis court to the Y.M.C.A. at East Point.

Ross left Hong Kong in 1913 by the SS Siberia to become Manager of Jardine Matheson's company in London (appointed by Henry Keswick on 30 September 1914). He also represented Hong Kong to the Imperial Council of Commerce in 1916.

Ross died on 23 November 1919 in London, leaving an estate worth £78,000. He married Eveline Isabel Bernard, daughter of Edmund Bowen Bernard and Arabella Margaret Piercy in 1910.

Legislative Council of Hong Kong
Preceded by Henry Keswick	Unofficial Member; 1911–1913	Succeeded by David Landale
