= T. H. Whitehead =

Scottish banker (1851–1933)

Thomas Henderson Whitehead
- Born: 1851; Dunblane, Scotland
- Died: 8 May 1933 (aged 81–82); London, England, U.K.
- Other name: T. H. Whitehead
- Occupation: Banker

Thomas Henderson Whitehead (August 1851 – 8 May 1933) was a Scottish banker in Hong Kong and member of the Executive Council and Legislative Council of Hong Kong.

Born at Dunblane, Scotland in August 1851, he initially planned his career as a lawyer and received legal and commercial training in Dunblane and Liverpool.

== Career ==
Whitehead joined the Chartered Bank of India, Australia, and China and became Manager of the Hong Kong branch in 1883 and Superintendent of its Far Eastern Branches in 1893. Whitehead represented the bank to the United States Government on the issue of maintaining the stability of Mexican dollars. He left Hong Kong in 1902 to take the bank's joint-manager in London.

He was appointed unofficial member of the Legislative Council in 1890 and Executive Council in 1902. Whitehead held criticism to the incompetence of the Tung Wah Hospital during the Plague of 1894 in the Legislative Council. Whitehead also suggested a recreation ground to be built in Causeway Bay in the 60th year of the reign of Queen Victoria. In 1896, Whitehead sent a petition to the Secretary of State for the Colonies, asking for a more representative government in Hong Kong. In 1902 Whitehead again represented the Hong Kong ratepayers to send a petition to the Parliament in London for constitutional reform of the Hong Kong municipal government.

Whitehead involved in the negotiations with the Chinese authorities in Peking and Canton over the Cassel loan of 1895 whereby Britain loaned the Chinese government a million pounds to help them pay the indemnity they owed to Japan after losing the First Sino-Japanese War. In 1900, the Qing Imperial Court appointed him as the Financial Adviser. In 1917 Whitehead was closely identified with the creation of the British Overseas Banks' Association (the organization later became the British Overseas and Commonwealth Banks Association in 1964), of which he became the first chairman. He was a prominent figure of the banking system until he retired in 1920.

Whitehead was also a correspondent for The Times in Hong Kong and came into prominence in 1895 when he disclosed the secret treaty between China and Russia regarding the occupation of Port Arthur.

Whitehead died in a London nursing house on 8 May 1933 at the age of 81. The cremation took place at Golders Green and interment at Dunblane.

== Publications ==
- How a crown colony is governed: Taxation without representation
- The Expansion of Trade in China
- British Interests in China
- Address on the Expansion of Trade with China
- World's Monetary Economic Crisis: World's Economic Laws Violated, World's Monetary Measures Answerable, Remedy
- The Critical Position of British Trade with Oriental Countries

== See also ==
- List of Executive Council of Hong Kong unofficial members 1896–1941

Legislative Council of Hong Kong
Preceded by Alexander Palmer MacEwen	Unofficial Member; Representative for Hong Kong General Chamber of Commerce; 1890–1902	Succeeded by Robert Gordon Shewan
