= Gershom Stewart =

Sir Gershom Stewart KBE (30 December 1857 – 5 December 1929) was a Scottish-born British businessman in Hong Kong who became a Conservative Party politician in England. He was a member of the Legislative Council of Hong Kong, and after his return to the United Kingdom he sat in the House of Commons from 1910 to 1923, as the Member of Parliament (MP) for the Wirral division of Cheshire.

A persistent opponent of Irish Home Rule, Stewart was one of the minority of Conservative MPs who opposed the Anglo-Irish Treaty in 1921. He was also one of the "Diehard Conservatives" who in late 1922 forced the end of the Lloyd George-led coalition government with the Liberals.

== Early life ==
Stewart was born in Greenock in Scotland, the son of Andrew Stewart and his wife Margaret (née Leitch), but grew up in England on the Wirral. He was educated at Mostyn House school, and at Bishop Vesey's Grammar School in Sutton Coldfield.

== Business ==
Stewart's first employment was in Liverpool in the East India trade. In 1882 he went to China to work for the Hong Kong and Shanghai Bank, but set up in business on his own in 1899. He became a member of the Legislative Council of Hong Kong and chairman of the China Association. In 1906 he represented Hong King at the Conference of the Chambers of Commerce of The Empire in London. In the same year he retired to England, taking residence in Hoylake on the Wirral with his wife Henrietta (1876–1946), who he had married in 1904.

== Political career ==
=== 1910 election ===
At the general election in January 1910 Stewart stood as the Conservative candidate for the Wirral, a seat which had been held by the Conservatives from its creation in 1885 until won by the Liberals in 1906. The sitting Liberal MP was the industrialist William Lever, who did not stand again, and the Liberal candidate was Edward Jones.

Stewart was a strong supporter of Tariff Reform, a cause which was popular in that area, and the campaign was strongly contested on both sides, with both candidates benefiting from a lot of support from Liverpool and the other large towns in Lancashire. Stewart won the seat with a majority of 1,447 (7.6%), and held it at the December 1910 election with an increased majority of 2,316 (13.0%).

=== In Parliament ===
In Parliament, he supported establishing sugar beet cultivation in the United Kingdom, and in 1911 he was one of several MPs to be a founding vice-president of the Incorporated English Beet Sugar Pioneer Association.

In January 1912, Stewart was the principal speaker at a public meeting in Flixton opposing Irish Home Rule. In May that year, he wanted to speak in the Commons in the second reading debate on the Home Rule Bill, but was not called by the speaker. After the signing of the Anglo-Irish Treaty in December 1921, which concluded the Irish War of Independence and led to the establishment of the Irish Free State in 26 of Ireland's 32 counties, Stewart was one of 58 MPs who voted against ratifying the treaty. In February 1922, he was one of 45 MPs from Great Britain to vote against the second reading of the Irish Free State (Agreement) Bill, which gave legal effect to the treaty.

He also opposed the suffragist movement, and was listed as a Parliamentary supporter of the National League for Opposing Woman Suffrage.

His constituency adjoined the Port of Liverpool, and Stewart took an interest in maritime issues. In 1913 he supported legislation against dangerous deckloads such as locomotives, which could break loose in a storm, and in 1918 he successfully lobbied for the expenses of repatriating merchant seamen being released from enemy countries to be paid by public funds.

In August 1913, he proposed using funds from the Boxer Indemnity to establish a British university in central China.

During the Great War, he was one of a group of 8 MPs who visited the Western Front in December 1915, and wrote an account of his visit for The Times newspaper. In February 1916 he was appointed to a committee to advise the Board of Trade on matters arising under the Trading with the Enemy Amendment Act 1906, and in 1917 he became a member of the Unionist war Committee, joining its Enemy Influence Sub-committee.

=== Post-war elections ===
Stewart was re-elected unopposed at the 1918 general election, standing as a Coalition Conservative. He held his seat at the 1922 general election in a three-cornered contest with 51% of the votes, a majority of 4,874 (19.3%) over his Liberal opponent Stephen Roxby Dodds. The Labour Party candidate came a poor third. At the next general election, in 1923, Labour did not field a candidate in the Wirral. The Times noted that Stewart's 1922 majority of 4,874 was little higher than the Labour vote of 4,363, and expecting Labour voters to support the Liberal candidate it predicted a close finish, but expected that Stewart would be returned. However, the Wirral was no exception to the nationwide pattern of a large swing to the Liberals, and Dodds won the seat with a majority of 1,840 votes (7.2%).

In Stanley Baldwin's resignation honours announced in February 1924, Stewart was made a Knight Commander of the Order of the British Empire (KBE), "for colonial and imperial services". The title was conferred at a ceremony on 7 March 1924, in the throne room of Buckingham Palace.

Stewart died aged 72 on 5 December 1929, at his home in Sloane Street, London. His funeral was held on 9 December at Holy Trinity Church on Sloane Street. His estate was valued at £71,834 (net).

Legislative Council of Hong Kong
| Preceded by Charles Stewart Sharp | Unofficial Member; 1903–1904 | Succeeded by Charles Stewart Sharp |
| Preceded by Charles Stewart Sharp | Unofficial Member; 1904–1907 | Succeeded by Edward Osborne |
Parliament of the United Kingdom
| Preceded by William Lever | Member of Parliament for Wirral; January 1910–1923 | Succeeded by Stephen Roxby Dodds |
