= Meigh Goodman =

Chief Justice of Hong Kong

Sir W. Meigh Goodman
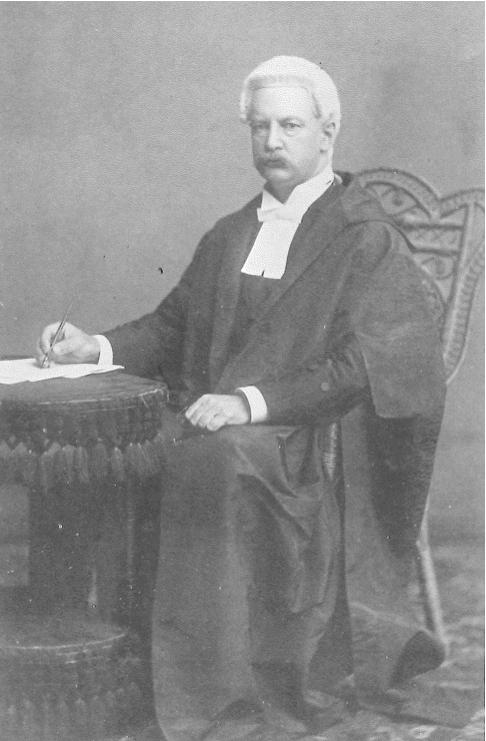
- Sir W. Meigh Goodman, Chief Justice of Hong Kong
- Born: 1847
- Died: 3 May 1928 (aged 80–81)
- Education: University College of London
- Occupations: Lawyer, Chief Justice

Sir William Meigh Goodman KC (1847 – 3 May 1928) was a British lawyer and Judge. He served as Attorney General and Chief Justice of British Honduras and Hong Kong in the late 19th and early 20th Century.

His last position before retirement was as Chief Justice of Hong Kong.

== Early life ==
Goodman was born in 1847 and was the fourth son of Samuel Robert Goodman, of London. Goodman was educated at University College of London where he obtained a B.A.(hons) in 1867. He was called to the Bar at the Middle Temple in 1870. He practised on the South Eastern Circuit and at the Surrey Sessions.

== Career ==
Goodman served as Attorney General of British Honduras (now Belize) from 1883 to 1886 and as Chief Justice of the same colony from 1886 to 1889. In 1886, he was commissioned to revise and consolidate the laws of British Honduras.

In 1889, Goodman was appointed Attorney-General and Admiralty Advocate of Hong Kong, taking up his post upon arrival on the City of Rio de Janeiro on 15 March of the next year. He was the first attorney-general of Hong Kong required to forego private practice. He served as acting Chief Justice from 6 March to 7 August 1895, during the absence of Sir Fielding Clarke, and for another four months in 1896 after the latter's retirement and was appointed a Queen's Counsel in 1900.

In March 1902, he was appointed Chief Justice of Hong Kong and led the court until 1905. He was appointed a Knight Bachelor in the November 1902 Birthday Honours, and received the dignity on 9 December 1902. In 1903 he presided over the laying of the foundation stone for the new Hong Kong Supreme Court building.

== Personal life ==
After the loss of his wife to a brief illness on 22 May 1890, Goodman took a leave of absence from 8 July until 7 January the next year.

He retired to England in 1905 and, in 1907, his book Reminiscences of a Colonial Judge was published. Though going by his second given name, he used the initial W on official documents.

He died on 3 May 1928 at the age of 81.

Legal offices
Preceded by Sir John W Carrington	Chief Justice of the Supreme Court of Hong Kong; 1902–1905	Succeeded by Sir Francis T Piggott
