= Edward Osborne (mayor of Hythe) =

Edward Osborne JP
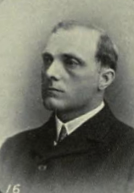

Mayor of Hythe
- In office 1922–1924

Personal details
- Born: 21 January 1861
- Died: 21 January 1939 (aged 78)
- Spouse: Phyllis Eliza Whitley (m. 1895)
- Children: 5
- Relatives: Sir Henry Osborne, 11th Baronet (grandfather)

Edward Osborne, JP (21 January 1861 – 21 January 1939) was a British businessman and politician. He was the secretary for the Hongkong and Kowloon Wharf and Godown Company (1889–1913), member of the Legislative Council of Hong Kong (1906–1913), and Mayor of Hythe (1922–24).

== Biography ==
Osborne was born on 2 January 1861. He was a son of Charles Osborne and wife Ann Geary and grandson of Sir Henry Osborne, 11th Baronet and second wife Elizabeth Harding. He was educated at St. Anne's and Streatham Hill. He entered a solicitor firm in Durham after graduation. In 1880, he left the firm and joined P&O and was sent to the Hong Kong offices in on 11 May 1882.

On 20 April 1889, Osborne joined the Hongkong and Kowloon Wharf and Godown Company. As secretary he encountered innumerable difficulties arising out of the organised attempts of the Chinese guilds to oppose the progress of the foreigner. Osborne was also director of the Dairy Farm, Steam Laundry and was member of the consulting committee of the AS Watson and the China Borneo Company. He also helped forming the Star Ferry Company and placing double-ended boats on the services between Hong Kong and Kowloon. He was responsible for building the Hong Kong Club. He also rescued the Hongkong Hotel Company from imminent bankruptcy at the request of the HSBC and the mortgagees, by placing it upon a dividend-paying basis.

Osborne was made Justice of the Peace and later became member of the Sanitary Board in 1900. During his service in the Sanitary Board, he helped fighting the plague. He also exterminated rats and enforced rules of health and cleanliness at the premises of his company. He also suggested setting up bathing places in the city which were carried out in 1913. In May 1906, Osborne succeeded William Gershom to be member of the Legislative Council and its Financial Committee and the Public Works Committee. In 1913, he was appointed to a committee to investigate Green Island Cement

Osborne retired from the Wharf Company in 1913 and left Hong Kong aboard the Empress of Japan to his family in Hythe. He later became Mayor of Hythe between 1922 and 1924.

== Personal life ==
Osborne fought in World War I between 1916 and 1918 in France. He was fond of outdoor sports especially rowing, riding, shooting, fishing and walking. He had walked from Beijing just after the Boxer Rebellion, across Korea, through parts of Japan and from Hankou to Guangzhou by way of Guilin. He also walked over most of the New Territories.

Edward Osborne married on 21 February 1895 Phyllis Eliza Whitley (? - 23 February 1966), daughter of George Whitley of Weybridge, Surrey, and had five children:

- Edward Osborne (? - 17 December 1902), died an infant
- Sybil Margaret Osborne (28 November 1895 – 23 February 1973), married on 14 June 1927 Hilary Cope Barry of Nut Trees Cottage, Reydon, Suffolk, and had issue.
- Stanley Patrick Osborne (7 July 1904 – 19 December 1989), educated at Felsted School, Felsted, Essex, and graduated from the University of Wales, with a Bachelor of Science (BSc) degree, Senior Experimental Officer at the Ministry of Supply and registered as an Associate Fellow of the Royal Aeronautical Society, married firstly on 11 September 1931 Muriel Harvey Matthews (27 Feb 1905 - 4 July 1968), who graduated with a Bachelor of Arts (BA) degree and was invested as a Fellow of the Royal Horticultural Society (FRHS), daughter of Llewellyn Harvey Matthews of Shrewsbury, Shropshire, and had two children, and married secondly in April 1969 Mary Enid Lyon, who graduated with a Bachelor of Arts (BA), daughter of Horace Lyon of Goole, Yorkshire, without issue:
  - Anthony Trevor Osborne (? – 2 November 1934), educated at his father's Alma Mater Felsted School, Felsted, Essex, and graduated from Emmanuel College, University of Cambridge, Cambridge, Cambridgeshire, with a Master of Arts (MA), registered as a Member of the Institution of Civil Engineers (MICE) and as a Certified Engineer (CEng) and lived in 2003 at 22 St. Peter's Way, Edgmond, Newport, Shropshire, married on 20 December 1958 Beryl Anne Shadbolt, daughter of Donald George Shadbolt of Welwyn Garden City, Hertfordshire, and had three children:
    - Catherine Frances Osborne (b. 15 September 1961)
    - Nicola Clare Osborne (b. 13 December 1963)
    - Marcus Duncan Fitzwilliam Osborne (b. 20 February 1967)
  - Edward Peter Osborne (20 February 1938 – 3 February 2002), usually went by his middle name of Peter, educated at his father's Alma Mater Felsted School, Felsted, Essex, and graduated from Peterhouse, University of Cambridge, Cambridge, Cambridgeshire, with a Bachelor of Arts (BA), married on 3 April 1961 Marjorie Newton, daughter of William Newton of Fleetwood, Lancashire, and had three children:
    - Judith Carol Osborne (b. 4 March 1962)
    - John Philip Osborne (b. 20 February 1963)
    - Janet Elizabeth Osborne (b. 29 March 1964)
- Nora Gladys Osborne (31 August 1906 – 6 August 1998)
- Aline Grace Osborne (2 August 1909 – 22 April 1970)

== Sources ==
- Charles Mosley, editor, Burke's Peerage, Baronetage & Knightage, 107th edition, 3 volumes (Wilmington, Delaware, U.S.A.: Burke's Peerage (Genealogical Books) Ltd, 2003), volume 2, page 3031.

Legislative Council of Hong Kong
Preceded by Gershom Stewart	Unofficial Member; 1906–1913	Succeeded by Edward Shellim
