= Henry Pollock =

English barrister & politician (1864–1953)

The Honourable Sir Henry Edward Pollock 普樂爵士 QC, JP
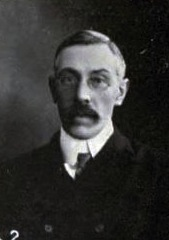

9th Attorney General of Fiji
- In office 1901–1903
- Monarch: Edward VII
- Governor: Sir William Allardyce; Sir Henry Jackson
- Preceded by: John Symonds Udal
- Succeeded by: Albert Ehrhardt

Acting Attorney General of Hong Kong
- In office 1896–1901
- Monarch: Victoria
- Governor: Sir William Robinson; Sir Henry Blake
- Preceded by: Sir W. Meigh Goodman
- Succeeded by: Sir W. Meigh Goodman
- In office 1919
- Monarch: George V
- Governor: Claud Severn
- Preceded by: Joseph Horsford Kemp
- Succeeded by: Joseph Horsford Kemp

14th Senior Unofficial Member of the Legislative Council of Hong Kong
- In office 1917–1941
- Monarchs: George V Edward VIII; George VI
- Governor: Sir Francis May; Sir Reginald Stubbs; Sir Cecil Clementi; Sir William Peel; Sir Andrew Caldecott; Sir Geoffry Northcote; Mark Aitchison Young
- Preceded by: Wei A. Yuk
- Succeeded by: D. F. Landale

2nd Senior Unofficial Member of the Executive Council of Hong Kong
- In office 1926–1941
- Monarchs: George V Edward VIII; George VI
- Governor: Sir Cecil Clementi; Sir William Peel; Sir Andrew Caldecott; Sir Geoffry Northcote; Mark Aitchison Young
- Preceded by: Catchick Paul Chater
- Succeeded by: Arthur Morse

Personal details
- Born: 16 December 1864 London, England
- Died: 2 February 1953 (aged 88) Sydney, Australia
- Spouse: Pauline Oakley
- Profession: Barrister, Politician

Sir Henry Edward Pollock, QC, JP (Chinese: 普樂, 16 December 1864 – 2 February 1953) was an English barrister who became a prominent politician in Hong Kong. He acted as Attorney General in Hong Kong on several occasions, and was once appointed to the same post in Fiji. He also served as Senior Unofficial Member of both the Legislative Council and Executive Council for many years in pre-Pacific War Hong Kong. Along with Sir Paul Chater, then Governor Sir Frederick Lugard (later Lord Lugard) and others, Sir Henry was one of the founders of the University of Hong Kong.

== Biography ==
=== Family background ===
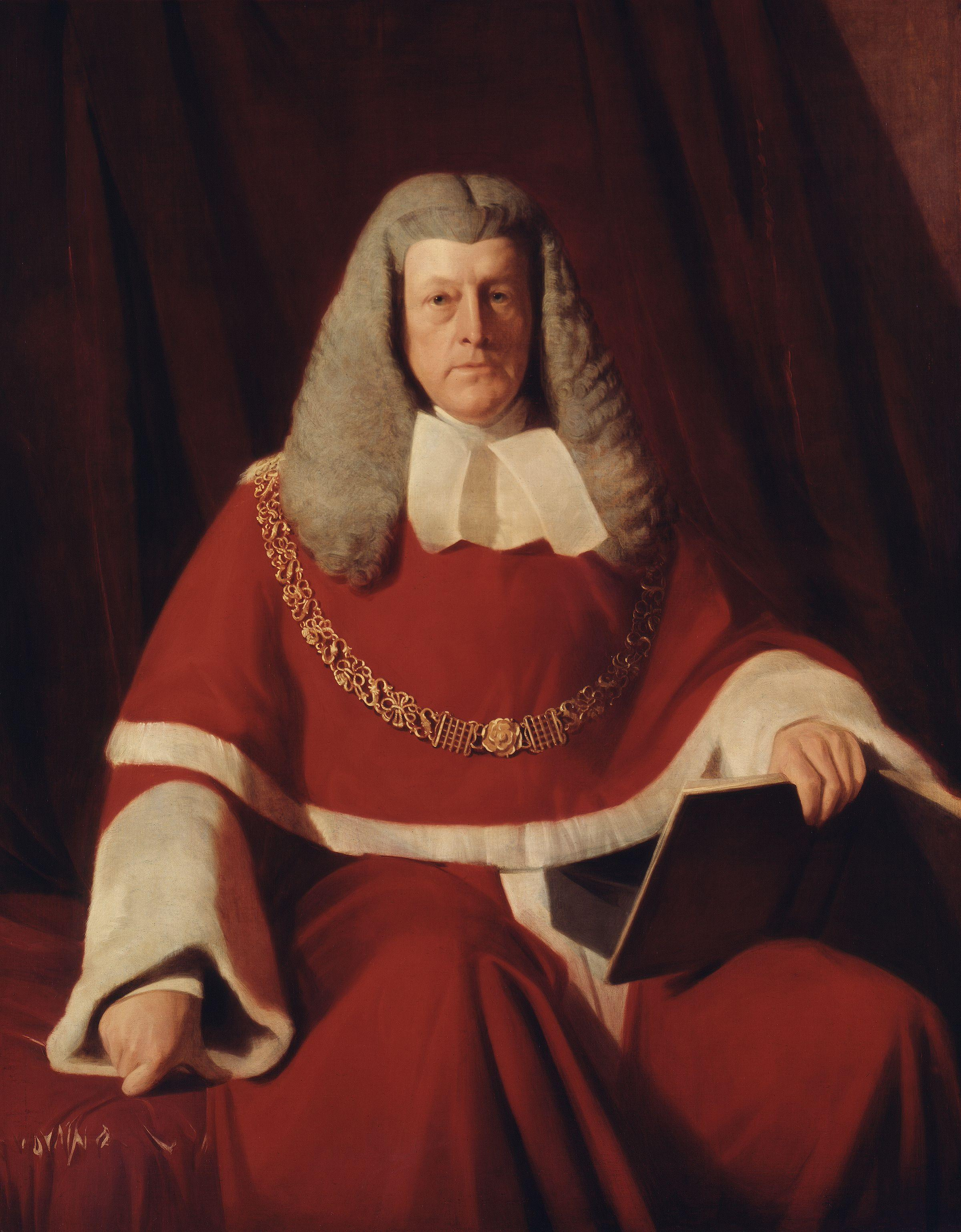
Sir Frederick Pollock, grandfather of Sir Henry.

Pollock was born to a well-known family in the law. His grandfather, Sir Frederick Pollock, 1st Baronet served as Attorney General for England and Wales between 1834 and 1835 and 1841 and 1844 in the Tory administrations of Sir Robert Peel; one of his many cousins, Sir Frederick Pollock, 3rd Baronet was a renowned professor of jurisprudence in the University of Oxford; another cousin of Pollock, Ernest Pollock, 1st Viscount Hanworth, served as the Master of the Rolls from 1925 to 1935.

Pollock's father was Dr. Arthur Julius Pollock (7 February 1835 – 11 May 1890). He was the eldest son in the second marriage of Sir Frederick Pollock, though he ranked thirteenth among the twenty-four children that Sir Frederick had. Dr. Pollock was a physician and lecturer in the Foundling Hospital and Charing Cross Hospital. He was also a Council member of the Royal College of Physicians.

Pollock was the third child of his mother, Ellen Bailey (? – 25 October 1895). He had an elder sister, Caroline (4 August 1862 – ?), an elder brother, Arthur Julius (21 August 1863 – 28 May 1914), and a younger brother, Charles Frederick (17 July 1866 – 17 July 1919).

=== Early years ===
Pollock was born in London, England on 16 December 1864. He spent his early childhood in London and was later admitted to the Charterhouse School. He quit the school in 1882 at the age of 18, and was promptly employed by a bank in Drury Lane. After one year of working, Pollock earned 50 pounds in total, and opted for continuing his study. He was successfully enrolled by the Inner Temple in 1883 and was called to the bar upon graduation in 1887.

In April 1888, seeking for new opportunities elsewhere, Pollock left his family and departed England for the then Crown Colony of Hong Kong. He was soon qualified as a barrister in Hong Kong, and set up his career in the legal profession.

=== Colonial life ===
Pollock was substantially valued by the local society not long after his arrival to the colony. For six months from September 1888 to March 1889, he had been appointed by the government as acting Police Magistrate. In 1891, he was appointed unofficial Justice of Peace, and later in 1892, he had served as acting Puisne Judge for the government for half a year. In 1894, Hong Kong was suffered from a severe plague which caused thousands of deaths. Pollock was noted for his work on relief during the plague and was awarded a gold medal by the government afterwards.

From 1896 to 1901, Pollock was appointed by the government as acting Attorney General, and thus became an ex officio member of both the Legislative Council and Executive Council. During his tenure as both an Attorney General and a councillor, his performance was highly regarded by his colleagues, and he was appointed Queen's Counsel as a reward in 1900. In 1902, Pollock was posted to Fiji and served as Attorney General in there. Nevertheless, he did not stay long in Fiji and returned to Hong Kong a year later. A year in Fiji did not weaken his influence in Hong Kong: he went on to serve as a member of the Sanitary Board from March 1903 to February 1906.

=== Life as councillor ===
In 1903, under the promotion of the Chamber of Commerce, Pollock had briefly served as acting Unofficial Member of the Legislative Council for around a year. Soon afterwards, he was again nominated by the unofficial Justices of Peace and became a full unofficial member of the council in December 1905. For nearly forty years, Pollock would continuously represent the unofficial Justices of Peace constituency in the council.

In his long tenure in the Legislative Council, Pollock was active in public service and served in a number of committees as member or chairman, including the Peace Celebration and War Memorial Finance Committee, Housing Commission and the Standing Law Committee. During the First World War, Pollock also sat as a Judge in the Appeal Tribunal; he was later reappointed for the same post on the outbreak of the Second World War in 1939.

As early as 1911 and 1912, Pollock was provisionally appointed twice as unofficial member of the Executive Council. However, he lost the chance to be appointed a full unofficial member in November 1915 when he unsuccessfully pressured the then governor, Sir Henry May in a Legislative Council meeting for replacing a vacancy for an unofficial member in the Executive Council through limited election.

Pollock was one of the most prominent activists on constitutional reform in pre-war Hong Kong. He did not give up after his request was abruptly turned down by Sir Henry. In January 1916, he sent a petition compiled with a few hundreds signatures to the Secretary of State for the Colonies, Bonar Law, and called for reform in both the Legislative and Executive Council. According to his proposal, he suggested that more unofficial seats should be created on the two councils. These new seats should be elected by members of the Chamber of Commerce and the unofficial Justices of Peace to let them be more fully represented. Also, Pollock supported the appointment of more Chinese to the two councils.

Pollock's proposal was also rejected by Bonar Law with no reason given. The relationship between Pollock and Sir Henry, was so badly damaged that Pollock was never again chosen to sit on the Executive Council during the governorship of Sir Henry. Pollock only became an unofficial member of the Executive Council after the retirement of Sir Henry, when his successor, Sir Reginald Stubbs, appointed him in 1921. Three years later, Pollock was appointed a Knight Bachelor in the 1924 Birthday Honours.

Pollock was appointed acting Attorney-General for three times in 1919, 1925 and 1928 respectively. In his capacity as acting Attorney-General, he sat in the two councils as ex officio member rather than unofficial member, and his unofficial seats in the Legislative Council was provisionally elected by his fellow Justices of Peace. In 1917, he succeeded Sir Boshan Wei Yuk as Senior Unofficial Member of the Legislative Council; later in 1926, he also became Senior Unofficial Member of the Executive Council after the death Sir Paul Chater, and therefore became the Senior Member of both two councils. Nevertheless, on 16 September 1928, Pollock had an accidental fall in his home at No. 367, the Peak. He broke his thigh heavily and could not assume his duties in the councils. As a result, another member of the Legislative and the Executive Council, Sir Shouson Chow, temporarily replaced him as Senior Member during his incapacity. Pollock recovered from the fall in December and reassumed his duties again.

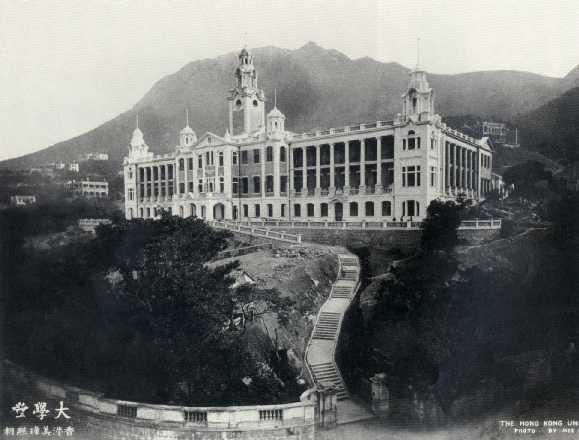
Sir Henry was one of the founders of the University of Hong Kong. He was later made a life member of the University Court.

Besides his duties in the two councils, Pollock had served as chairman of the Hong Kong Branch of the Navy League, the Chess Club, the Society for the Prevention of Cruelty to Animals and the Constitutional Reform Association. He had also served as Commodore of the Royal Hong Kong Yacht Club, Secretary of the Odd Volumes Society and corresponding secretary to the Royal Colonial Institute.

Pollock was instrumental to the establishment of the University of Hong Kong as he was one of the founders of the University. Pollock was originally a member of the council of the Hong Kong College of Medicine for Chinese. In March 1908, along with Sir Paul Chater, Sir Kai Ho-Kai and a few other people, Pollock was appointed to the newly founded organising committee of the University of Hong Kong which was chaired by Sir Paul Chater by then governor Sir Frederick Lugard (later Lord Lugard). When the University of Hong Kong was officially founded in 1911, Pollock was appointed a life member of the University Court. Pollock was said to be an active member who frequently attend the Court's meetings, and was noted for his enthusiasm towards the development of the University. In acknowledging his contribution, he received Honorary Doctorates of Law from the University on 5 January 1925.

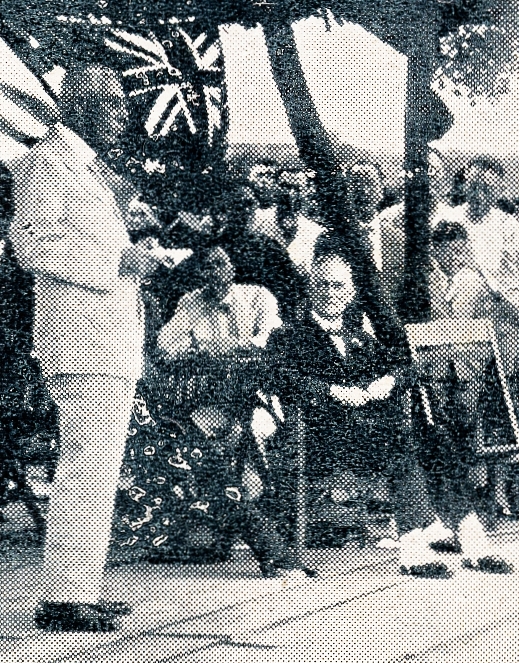
Sir Henry (left) delivered a speech in the foundation stone-laying ceremony of the new school site for St. Stephen's College in Stanley on 27 April 1928. The ceremony was presided over by then governor Sir Cecil Clementi,(sitting in the front row).

Pollock had close ties with St. Stephen's College as he was one of the guests invited to the foundation stone-laying ceremony of the College's new school site in Stanley in 1928. Furthermore, in 1933, under the assistance from him and Sir Robert Kotewall, the student-actors and student-actresses of the College were allowed to play on the same stage in a fundraising drama event regardless the opposition from the conservative Chinese community.

=== Final years ===
On 17 January 1940 and in the beginning of 1941, Pollock was appointed unofficial member of the Legislative and the Executive Council respectively for a further period of four years and five years. However, in December 1941, the Pacific War broke out suddenly and Hong Kong fell into Imperial Japan's hands after a month of resistance. Fortunately, Pollock and his wife were in Australia for health reason at the outbreak of the war, thus they were not in Hong Kong during the Japanese invasion and did not end up in Hong Kong as prisoners of war.

Although the colonial Legislative Council and Executive Council ceased to operate during the Japanese occupation of Hong Kong, Pollock was still nominally the Senior Member of the Legislative and Executive Council until the expiration of his terms in 1944 and on 8 March 1946. Pollock's final term as Senior Unofficial Member of the Executive Council traversed the Japanese occupation of Hong Kong and ended after the Liberation of Hong Kong in 1945, but in reality, he never attended any meeting of the two councils after the fall of Hong Kong. The Hong Kong Government later issued a notice in the Hong Kong Gazette in May 1946, thanking Pollock for his contribution to the colony.

The Second World War made a sudden ending to Pollock's life and public service in Hong Kong. Although he paid several visits to Hong Kong after the war, he and his wife settled permanently in Sydney after the outbreak of the Pacific War. Pollock died in Sydney on 2 February 1953, aged 88.

== Family ==
Pollock married his wife, Pauline Oakley in Hong Kong in 1906 when he was 42. They had no children. Lady Oakley was a long-time resident in Hong Kong and was noted for her active participation in local public services, especially in the Street Sleepers' Society, St John's Cathedral Women's Guild and the Society for the Prevention of Cruelty to Animals.

Since the outbreak of the Second Sino-Japanese War in 1937, the refugee camps in Hong Kong had also become a chief interest to Lady Pollock. In 1940, Lady Pollock, Soong Ai-ling and others initiated a campaign in Hong Kong and Canton to set up cooperatives which could accommodate 6,000 refugees to restore production. Lady Pollock was subsequently appointed an Officer of the Order of the British Empire (OBE) in the New Year Honours of 1941 for her eminent contribution.

== Bibliography ==
- Bill of Lading Exceptions, London: Stevens and Sons, 1894.
- Regulations for Preventing Collisions at Sea

== Honours ==
- J.P. (24 April 1891 )
- Gold Medal for Plague Services (1894)
- Q.C. (1900)
- Kt. (King's birthday honour list 1924)

=== Honorary degrees ===
- University of Hong Kong (Hon. LLD, 5 January 1925)

=== Place named after him ===
- Pollock Path: a cul-de-sac on the top of Mount Gough, Hong Kong Island.

== See also ==
- Legislative Council of Hong Kong
- Executive Council of Hong Kong
- Attorney General (Hong Kong)
- University of Hong Kong

== Footnotes ==
Legal offices
Preceded by William Meigh Goodman	Acting; Attorney General of Hong Kong; 1896–1901	Succeeded by William Meigh Goodman
Preceded by John Symonds Udal	Attorney General of Fiji; 1902	Succeeded by Albert Ehrhardt
Preceded by Joseph Horsford Kemp	Acting; Attorney General of Hong Kong; 1919	Succeeded by Joseph Horsford Kemp
Preceded by Joseph Horsford Kemp	Acting; Attorney General of Hong Kong; 1925	Succeeded by Joseph Horsford Kemp
Preceded by Joseph Horsford Kemp	Acting; Attorney General of Hong Kong; 1928	Succeeded by Joseph Horsford Kemp
Legislative Council of Hong Kong
Preceded by Robert Gordon Shewan	Acting; Unofficial Member; Representative for Hong Kong General Chamber of Commerce; 1903–1904	Succeeded by Robert Gordon Shewan
Preceded by Catchick Paul Chater	Unofficial Member; Representative for Justices of the Peace; 1906–1941	Japanese occupation of Hong Kong
Preceded by Wei Yuk	Senior Unofficial Member; 1917–1941	Japanese occupation of Hong Kong
Political offices
Preceded by William Hartigan; James McKie	Member of the Sanitary Board; 1903–1906	Succeeded by Henry Humphreys; Augustus Shelton Hooper
Preceded by Catchick Paul Chater	Provisional Unofficial Member of the Executive Council of Hong Kong; 1911	Succeeded by Catchick Paul Chater
Preceded by Edbert Ansgar Hewett	Provisional Unofficial Member of the Executive Council of Hong Kong; 1912	Succeeded by Edbert Ansgar Hewett
New seat	Unofficial Member of the Executive Council of Hong Kong; 1921–1941	Japanese occupation of Hong Kong
Preceded by Catchick Paul Chater	Senior Unofficial Member of the Executive Council; 1926–1941	Japanese occupation of Hong Kong
