= Unofficial Member =

Hong Kong government-like position

- Traditional Chinese: 非官守議員
Transcriptions
Yue: Cantonese
- Yale Romanization: Fēi gūn sáu yíh yùhn
- Jyutping: Fei1 gun1 sau2 yi5 jyun4

Unofficial Member is the name given to individuals who are members of the Executive Council of Hong Kong and Legislative Council of Hong Kong but who are not members of the Hong Kong Government. The terms "Unofficial" (or "non-official") and "Official" refer to whether the individual holds governmental office; both categories hold full membership of the councils.

Before the direct election of Legislative Council members in 1991, the Government reflected the views and opinions of Hong Kong society by appointing members of the business and social elites to the two councils. These members acted as a bridge between local residents and the Government. From 1963 to 1989, the Unofficial members of both councils formed the UMELCO Office, which took complaints from Hong Kong residents.

These positions were appointments by the Governor of Hong Kong, to sit in the Councils together with ex officio members and other Official Members. A Senior Unofficial Member would be appointed by the Governor from among the Unofficial Members. Unofficial Members might also be appointed to unelected or partially elected Municipal and District Councils, where there were ex officio members.

Currently the Executive Council of Hong Kong is still composed of ex officio Members (Official Members since 1997) and Unofficial Members (Non-official Members since 1997). One of the Non-official Members is appointed by the Chief Executive (until 1997 the Governor) as the Convenor (until 1994 the senior unofficial member).

== See also ==
- List of Legislative Council of Hong Kong members 1843–1941
- List of Legislative Council of Hong Kong unofficial members 1946–1985
