= David Hadden =

Scottish-American merchant

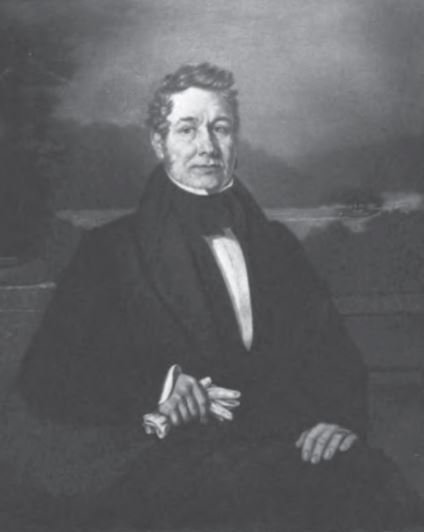

President of the Saint Andrew's Society of the State of New York
- In office 1837–1840
- Preceded by: Hugh Maxwell
- Succeeded by: David Sproat Kennedy
- In office 1832–1835
- Preceded by: John Johnston
- Succeeded by: Hugh Maxwell

Personal details
- Born: October 13, 1773 Aberdeen, Scotland
- Died: June 3, 1856 (aged 82) New York City, U.S.
- Spouse: Ann Aspinwall (m. 1809; died 1845)
- Relations: John A. Hadden Jr. (grandson); Charles Alexander Tomes (grandson)
- Children: 11

David Hadden (October 13, 1773 – June 3, 1856) was a Scottish-American merchant who served as the president of the Saint Andrew's Society of the State of New York.

== Early life ==
Hadden was born at Aberdeen, Scotland on October 13, 1773, and on September 22, 1778, he was "admitted an infant Guild burgess of Aberdeen." He was the son of Elspet (née Young) Hadden and Alexander Hadden, Bailie of Aberdeen, and merchant with Alexander Hadden & Sons. His older brothers, James Hadden of Persely, and Gavin Hadden were each Provost of Aberdeen.

His maternal grandparents were Rachel (née Cruickshank) Young and James Young, merchant-burgess of Aberdeen.

== Career ==
Hadden apprenticed with a cloth manufacturer in Leeds in Yorkshire before setting up his own business there.

He departed Liverpool for New York, aboard the New Guide, on September 23, 1806, arriving nearly two months later on November 18, 1806. After arriving in New York, he established the merchant house known as David Hadden & Sons on Pine Street in Lower Manhattan. The firm, which was later called Hadden & Co., was extremely successful and imported raw silks and mattings. In 1845, his wealth was estimated at $200,000 (equivalent to $6,911,000 in 2025). After his death, his descendants kept the firm going.

Hadden served as Senior Warden of St. Thomas's Episcopal Church and was member of the Saint Andrew's Society of the State of New York, serving as president, twice, from 1832 to 1835 and, again, from 1837 to 1840.

== Personal life ==
On May 16, 1809, Hadden was married to Ann Aspinwall (1786–1845) at Flushing on Long Island. Ann was the daughter of fellow merchant William Smith Aspinwall and Mary (née Bostwick) Apsinwall. Together, they lived at 20 Lafayette Place in New York City, the most exclusive location in the city at the time, and were the parents of eleven children:

- Isabella Hadden (1810–1842), who married Charles Tomes, brother of Robert Tomes.
- William Alexander Hadden (1811–1880), who married Frances Sanderson Smith, daughter of James Elnathan Smith, in 1849.
- Mary Aspinwall Hadden (b. 1812), who lived at 18 East 33rd Street in New York.
- Sarah Platt Hadden (1814–1850), who died unmarried.
- Margaret Frances Hadden (1815–1879), who died unmarried in Florence, Italy.
- Anna Hadden (b. 1816), who also lived at 18 East 33rd Street in New York.
- John Aspinwall Hadden (1818–1906), who married Frances "Fanny" Mactier, daughter of Alexander Mactier, in 1855.
- Eleanor Hadden (1820–1894), who married Francis Tomes Jr., also a brother of Robert Tomes.
- Laura Hadden (1822–1894), who married Benjamin Curtis, a silk importer based in Paris, in 1856. His brother Lewis was the grandfather of Elizabeth Beers-Curtis, Marquise de Talleyrand.
- David James Hadden (1825–1826), who died in infancy.
- Elizabeth Farquhar Hadden (1828–1887), who lived at 18 East 33rd Street and died unmarried.

His wife died on September 3, 1845, and was buried at St. Thomas' Church. Hadden died at his residence in New York City on June 3, 1856. After a funeral at St. Thomas Church conducted by the Rev. Francis L. Hawks, he was buried in a vault at Trinity Church Cemetery (where his wife was re-interred).

=== Descendants ===
Through his daughter Eleanor, he was a grandfather of merchant Charles Alexander Tomes, who took over Russell & Co., one of the largest mercantile firms in the Far East, with Robert Shewan after it went bankrupt in 1892 and renamed it Shewan, Tomes & Co. His daughter, Joan Elspeth Tomes (1901–1980), was married to Arthur Baldwin, 3rd Earl Baldwin of Bewdley, son of Stanley Baldwin, 1st Earl Baldwin of Bewdley, three-time Prime Minister of the United Kingdom.

Through his daughter Laura, he was a grandfather of Ann Aspinwall Curtis (b. 1859), William Hadden Curtis (b. 1861), and Dr. Benjamin Farquhar Curtis (1857–1924), a prominent physician who graduated from Columbia University College of Physicians and Surgeons and was the attending surgeon at St. Luke's Hospital in New York.

Through his son John, he was a grandfather of Alexander Mactier Hadden (1862–1942) and John Aspinwall Hadden Jr. (1858–1931), a noted clubman during the Gilded Age who was listed on Ward McAllister's "Four Hundred" in 1892. He married Marie Torrance, a granddaughter of John Torrance and her Commodore Cornelius Vanderbilt.
