= Alexander Stuart-Hill =

Scottish artist (1889–1948)

Alexander Stuart-Hill (1889 – 20 February 1948) was a Scottish portrait and landscape artist who, while living in Paris, was engaged to Princess Louise of Battenberg before her marriage to King Gustaf VI Adolf of Sweden.

== Early life ==
Stuart-Hill was born in 1889 was born in Perth, Scotland. His father, William Hill, was a fishmonger.

He studied at Edinburgh College of Art, where he was awarded a scholarship that allowed him to travel around France, Italy and Spain.

== Career ==
From 1920 to 1947, Stuart-Hill regularly exhibited portraits and landscapes at the Royal Academy of Arts. He showed at the Grosvenor Gallery with the Royal Society of Portrait Painters, and at the New Chenil Galleries in Chelsea. In 1932, he designed a poster for Shell with Vorticist overtones which showed Mousehole, Penzance. In 1937, the Redfern Gallery held a one-man exhibition of his portraits and views of London bridges, including Battersea Bridge (1937) and The Thames at Charing Cross Bridge (which famously had been painted by Claude Monet in 1899). In 1943, he designed another poster for London Transport that featured bridges over the Thames.

His portrait subjects included the Duchesse de Choiseuil-Praslin c. 1914, (Note: The Duchesse de Choiseuil-Praslin was an American, the former Mary Elizabeth "Nellie" Forbes (1854–1932), sister of William and H. De Courcy Forbes and wife of Gaston, 6th Duc de Choiseuil-Praslin (son of Charles de Choiseul-Praslin and Françoise, duchesse de Praslin). Her eldest son Gaston, 7th Duc de Choiseuil-Praslin, married the former Lucie Grundy (née Tate) Paine, a widow of Boston investment banker Charles Hamilton Paine, a partner in Paine Webber, in 1910.) Lilias Livingstone Mackinnon c. 1920, (Note: Lilias Livingstone Mackinnon (d. 1974) was a concert pianist, and a sister of zoologist Doris Mackinnon.) Admiral Sir H. Goodenough King-Hall (1920), Arthur Greenhow Lupton, First Pro-Chancellor of the University of Leeds (1923), Turner Layton (1927), Florence Mills (1927), and the Baroness Posznanska (1945).

His landscape subjects focused on his native Scotland as well as other parts of Europe, including views of Santa Margherita, Italy (c. 1927–1928) and Early Spring Sunshine in Amalfi. In Perth, he painted The Tay in Sunshine, Kinnoull Hill, and the Cottage at Burghmuir.

== Personal life ==
During World War I, Stuart-Hill worked in a military hospital in Nevers where he began a relationship with fellow volunteer Princess Louise of Battenberg (later Lady Louise Mountbatten). She was the younger daughter of Prince Louis of Battenberg, an admiral in the British Royal Navy who renounced his German titles and anglicised the family name to "Mountbatten" at the behest of George V in 1917. Anticipating that her parents would be disappointed in the choice, Louise kept their engagement a secret for two years. Eventually, she confided in her parents, who were initially understanding, and twice invited him for visits at Kent House at East Cowes on the Isle of Wight. Her family, referring to him as "Shakespeare" because of his odd appearance, found him "eccentric" and "affected". Lacking resources, the engaged couple agreed to postpone marriage until after the war. But in 1918, Louise's father explained to her that Stuart-Hill was most likely homosexual, and that a marriage with him was impossible; she later married Crown Prince Gustaf Adolf of Sweden.

According to his obituary in The Times, in addition to painting, "there was nothing Stuart could not do with his hands, from building chimneys and repairing roofs to the most delicate work in petit-point embroidery". His studio, located at 41 Glebe Place in Chelsea, was a "lively social meeting place in the years before the Second World War". Attendees included members of the Bright young things, Evelyn Waugh, Florence Mills, Alice Delysia, Turner Layton, and Clarence "Tandy" Johnstone.

Stuart-Hill died on 20 February 1948 in Chelsea.

== Legacy ==
Today, his works are in the collections of the Perth Museum and Art Gallery, the Imperial War Museum, Dundee Art Galleries and Museums Collection, the Ulster Museum, The Stanley & Audrey Burton Gallery (at the University of Leeds), and the Perth and Kinross Council.
