= Murgoci =

Murgoci is a Romanian surname. Notable people with the surname include:

- Agnes Murgoci (1875–1929), English zoologist and folklorist
- Gheorghe Munteanu Murgoci (1872–1925), Romanian geologist
- Elena Murgoci (1960–1999), Romanian marathon runner
