= Esther Blaikie MacKinnon =

Scottish artist (1884–1934)

- Born: 1885; Aberdeen, Scotland
- Died: 1934 (aged 48–49); Banchory, Scotland
- Known for: Painting; Engraving

Esther Blaikie MacKinnon (1885–1934) was a Scottish artist who was known for her paintings and engravings. MacKinnon worked with a variety of media including paint, dry point, etchings, and black and white drawings.

== Biography ==
The second child of Lachlan MacKinnon (1855–1948) and Theodora Thompson (1859–1939), Esther MacKinnon was born and educated in Aberdeen. Her older sister Doris Mackinnon was a zoologist; her younger sister Lilias Mackinnon was a pianist. MacKinnon primarily worked out of her studio in Hampstead, London, and during her lifetime her engravings and paintings were exhibited widely. She died unmarried at the age of 49. Her portraits of Cecil and Evelyn Sharp, are part of The National Portrait Gallery's primary collection. Her work was exhibited at the Royal Scottish Academy, the Royal Glasgow Institute, the Royal Academy and the Society of Women Artists within her lifetime.

== Selected works ==
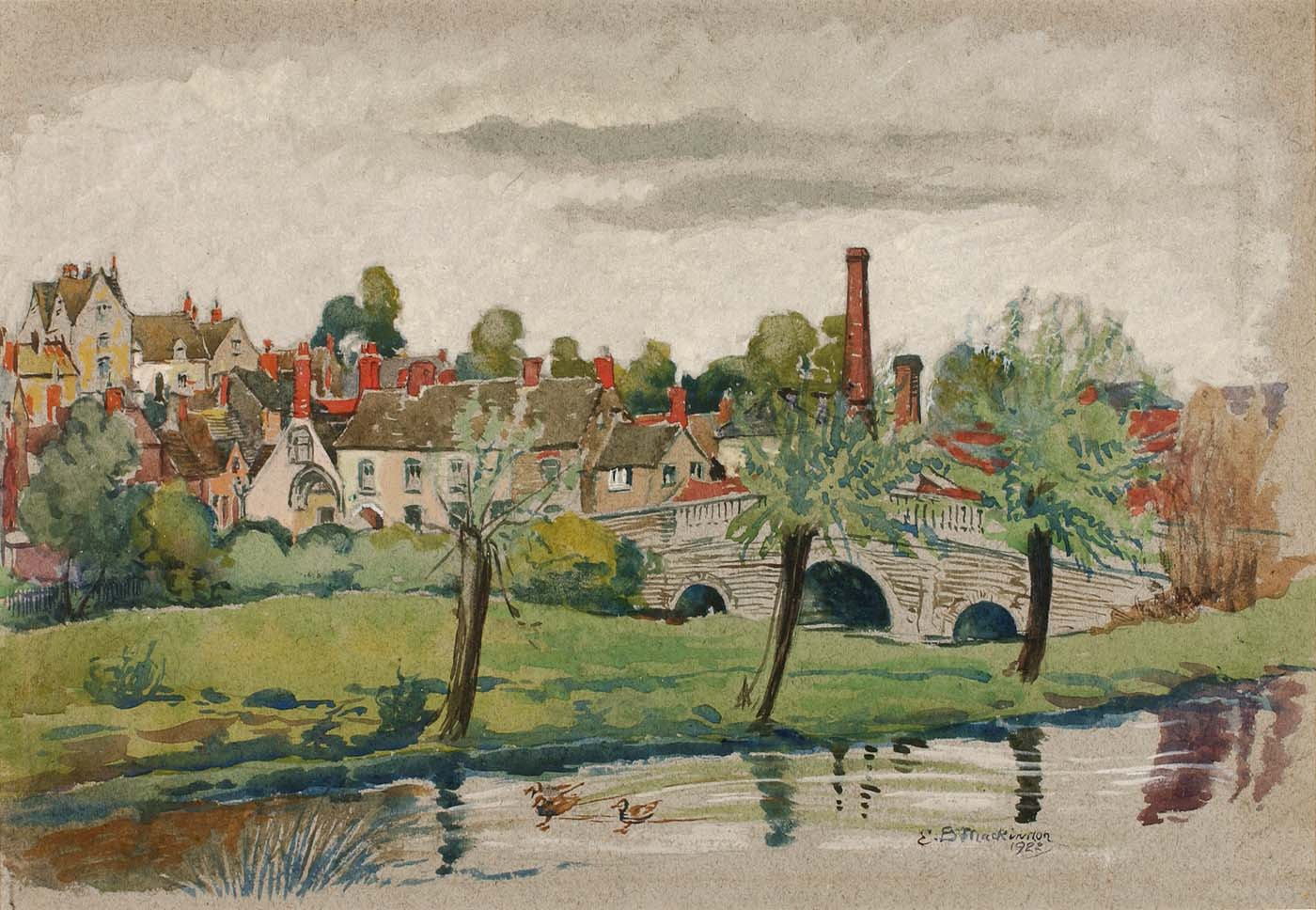
A watercolour sketch of Malmesbury, 1922.

- Cecil Sharp, 1921. Chalk. National Portrait Gallery.
- Cecil Sharp, 1921. Pencil. National Portrait Gallery.
- Lions in a London Square, n.d. Etching and aquatint on paper. Smithsonian American Art Museum.
- Malmesbury, 1922. Watercolour and pencil on paper. Smithsonian American Art Museum.
- A Negress, n.d. Oil on canvas. Aberdeen Art Gallery & Museums.
- Weaver, n.d. Colour Lithograph. Smithsonian American Art Museum.
