= William Howell Forbes =

- Born: November 25, 1837; New York City, New York, U.S.
- Died: July 10, 1896 (aged 58); Newburgh, New York, U.S.
- Resting place: Riverside Cemetery, Fairhaven, Massachusetts
- Occupation: Merchant
- Employer: Russell & Co.
- Spouse: Deborah Perry Delano (m. 1867)
- Parent(s): Paul Siemen Forbes; Valeria Medora Forbes
- Relatives: Henry De Courcy Forbes (brother); Robert Bennet Forbes (uncle); John Murray Forbes (uncle); Franklin Delano Roosevelt (nephew)

William Howell Forbes (November 25, 1837 – July 10, 1896) was an American businessman in Hong Kong. He was the head partner of the Russell & Co. and was the 11th chairman of the board of Directors of Hongkong and Shanghai Banking Corporation from 1879 to 1880. He was the uncle of United States President Franklin Delano Roosevelt.

== Early life ==
William Forbes was born on November 25, 1837, in New York, United States to the Forbes family. He was the eldest son of Paul Siemen Forbes (1808–1886), who travelled to China in 1857 joined his cousin John Murray Forbes who had been heavily involved in China trade and served as partner in Russell & Co., prominent American trading firm in the Far East, and as the United States Consul in Canton. William had two younger brothers, Henry De Courcy Forbes (1849–1920) and Paul Revere Forbes (1860–1936).

== Career ==
Like many family members before him, William Forbes joined the Russell & Co. as a partner in 1865 in the trading firm when the American Civil War was about to end. At that time the Russell & Co. was engaged in the Anglo-American steamship rivalry on the Yangtze River. The Russell & Co. saw the opportunity to introduce American-produced steamboats to the new treaty ports along the Yangtze Basin, as the Qing government underwent a massive industrialisation project. It relied on the friendship with Chinese compradors and merchants as well as the fund from some British companies to found the Shanghai Steam Navigation Company.

Russell & Co. refused to join the Hongkong and Shanghai Banking Corporation when was first formed in 1866, as Russells' main rival in shipping, the Augustine Heard & Co. was one of the largest shareholders of the new bank, similar to the Jardines' attitude as its major rival Dent & Co. was on the board and its chairman. Russells was also content with its own banking branch. However, Russells gradually changed its attitude as it established relationship with the Hongkong and Shanghai Bank. By December 1866, William Forbes was elected to the board of directors of the bank and subsequently chairman on several occasions.

However, the Russell & Co. gradually lost competition against the British Jardine, Matheson & Co. which was more efficient under the leadership of the Chinese comprador Tong King-sing. The Russells faced difficulties as it was lack of funding for development and was further devastated during the financial crisis. In the period between the 1860s and 70s, many major firms failed, including the British firm Dent & Co., Beale & Co., Maitland, Bush & Co., Mackellar & Co.; and the American firm Olyphant & Co. In 1875, Russells' major competitor Augustine Heard & Co. failed which led to the resignation of Albert Heard from the board of the Hongkong and Shanghai Bank.

=== Russells failure ===
Russells attempted to rescue itself when it was about to bankrupt by founding the National Bank of China to draw some capital. Forbes became one of the founders with his brother Henry De Courcy and the Howqua family whom they had established a close relationship for a long time. S. W. Pomeroy, a Russell partner and former director of the Hongkong and Shanghai Bank, with other members of the company, criticised Forbes brothers for sponsoring the National Bank in which the Hongkong and Shanghai Bank viewed as rival, which led to William Forbes's resignation from the board of the Hongkong and Shanghai Bank in March 1891.

As a result, credit from that bank to Russell & Co. was curtailed. The antagonistic Hongkong and Shanghai Bank forced Russells to sell its assets to bail it out. The Russell & Co. collapsed few months after on 9 June 1891. The firm was business acquired by two of its employees, Robert Shewan and Alexander Charles Tomes, who renamed the firm Shewan, Tomes & Co. in 1895.

=== Life in Hong Kong ===
During his life in Hong Kong, Forbes was also vice-president of the Medical Missionary Society of China which operated a hospital and missionary works in Canton. He was also a member of the Hong Kong General Chamber of Commerce and the founding steward of the Hong Kong Jockey Club in 1884. He had also been briefly an honorary consul for the Sweden and Norway in Hong Kong. It is said that Forbes Street, in Kennedy Town, is named after William Forbes.

== Personal life ==
In 1867, after a period of engagement, Forbes married Deborah "Dora" Perry Delano (1847–1940), daughter of Warren Delano Jr., also a partner at the Russell & Co., in Paris. Dora's young sister, Sara Ann Delano, married James Roosevelt I and gave birth to Franklin Delano Roosevelt, who later became the 32nd President of the United States. William was also one of Franklin's godfathers.

Forbes lived with his wife at a villa called Rose Hill on Caine Rd, in Hong Kong. He died on July 10, 1896, at the age of 58, in Newburgh, New York, and was buried at the Riverside Cemetery in Fairhaven, Massachusetts. After William died in 1896, his wife Dora married his brother, Paul Revere, in 1903.
