= Action off Măcin =

1877 naval battle

- Part of the Russo-Turkish War (1877–1878) and Romanian War of Independence
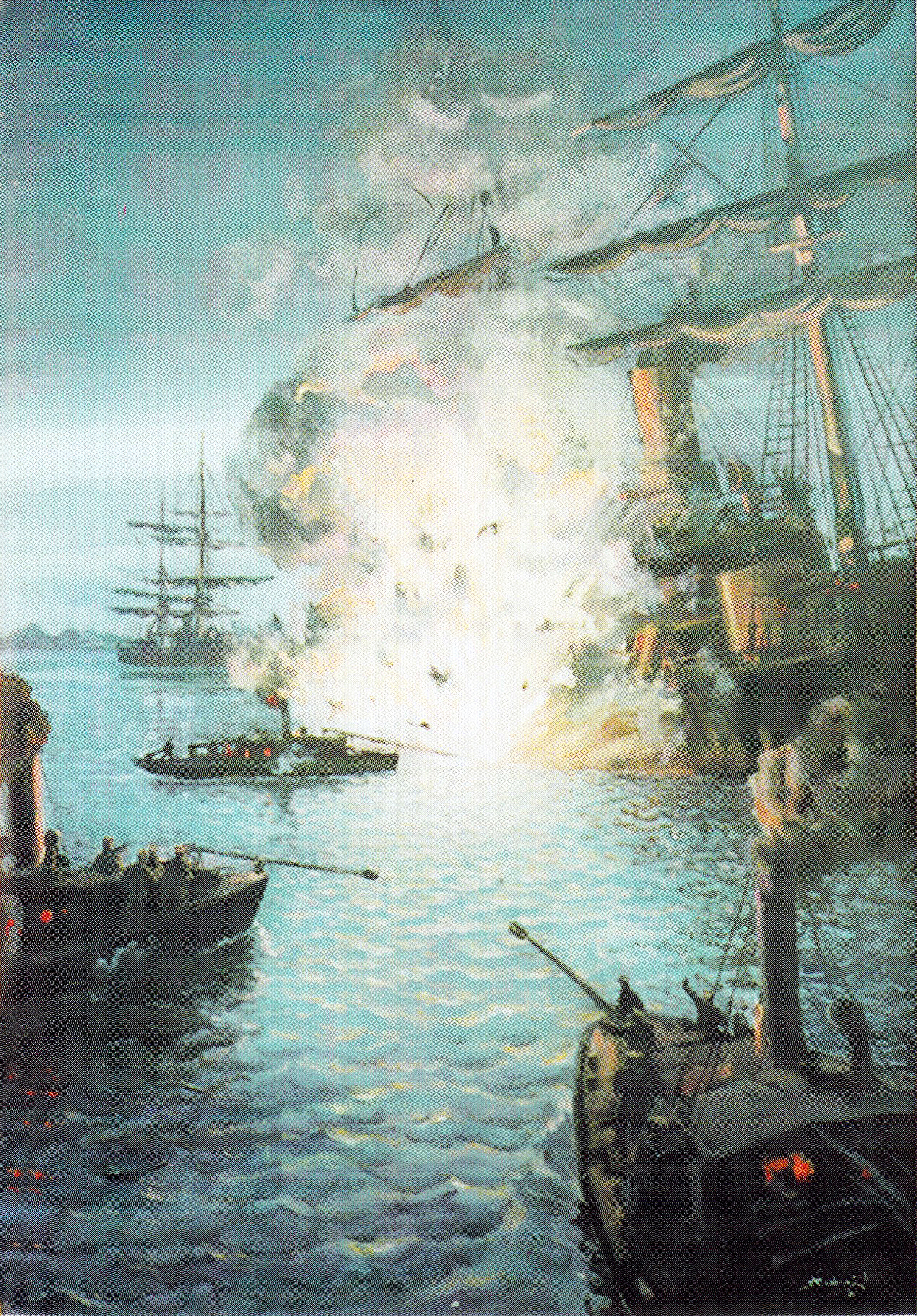
- The attack off Măcin 1877, oil on canvas by Dimitrie Știubei, Romanian Navy Museum Constanța
Date	25–26 May 1877
Location	Near Măcin, Romania
Result	Romanian–Russian victory

Belligerents
Romania; Russian Empire	Ottoman Empire

Strength
4 torpedo boats 6 officers 40 sailors	2 monitors 1 paddle steamer

Casualties and losses
None	1 monitor sunk Unknown casualties

The action off Măcin was a naval engagement between a torpedo boat of the Romanian Navy with a mixed Romanian-Russian crew, together with another 3 Russian torpedo boats, and a monitor of the Ottoman Navy which took place during the 1877–1878 Russo-Turkish War. It was the first time in history that a torpedo craft sank its target without being sunk itself.

== Background ==
The Principality of Romania acquired its first torpedo boat in 1875, two years before the start of the Russo-Turkish War. She was built in the United Kingdom. Named Rândunica, she was a 10-ton launch armed with a single spar torpedo. She was powered by a steam engine giving her a top speed of 8 knots and had a crew of five.

Romania joined the Russo-Turkish War in April 1877, signing a treaty of alliance with the Russian Empire which allowed the Russian Army to cross through Romanian territory. On 10 May, Romania declared its independence.

== Engagement ==
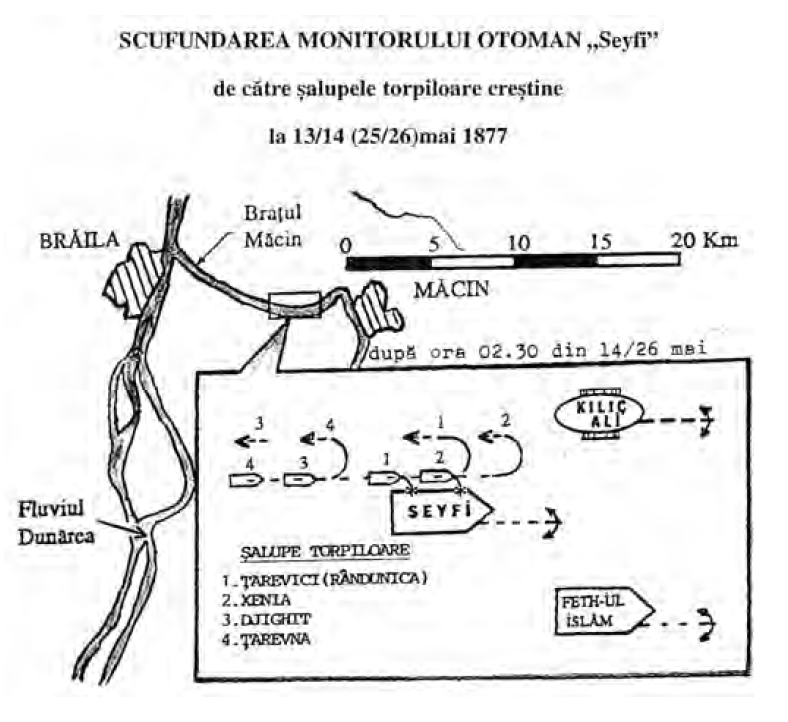
Diagram of the attack

According to the Russian-Romanian treaty signed in April that year, Rândunica served under joint Romanian-Russian command. She was also known as Tsarevich by the Russians. Her crew consisted of a Russian Lieutenant, Dubasov, three Romanians: Major Murgescu (the official liaison officer with the Russian headquarters), engine mechanic Vasile Belea, navigator Gheorghe Constantinescu and another 10 sailors. The attack carried out by the torpedo boat Rândunica, together with the torpedo boats Xenia (commanded by Lieutenant Shestakov), Dzigit (commanded by Ensign Persine) and Tzarevna (commanded by Ensign Ball) against the monitors Seyfî and Feth-ül Islam and the paddle steamer Kîlîc Ali took place during the night of 25–26 May 1877, near Măcin.

Under the cover of the darkness and at low speed, the group of torpedo boats got to about 60 meters from the Turkish ships when Seyfî opened fire. Lieutenant Dubasov turned Rândunica to attack. As she was approaching the Ottoman monitor, the latter fired three rounds at her without any effect. Before she could fire the fourth round, Rândunica 's spar struck her between the midships and the stern. A powerful explosion followed, with debris from the Ottoman warship rising up to 40 meters in the air. The half-sunk monitor then re-opened fire, but was struck once again, by Xenia, with the same devastating effects. The crew of Seyfî subsequently fired their rifles at the torpedo boats. After 10 minutes, at 3 o'clock in the morning, the monitor sunk. Lieutenant Dubasov did not want to risk another attack and ordered a retreat. As the boats were retreating the two remaining Ottoman ships opened fire without any success. Following this action, Ottoman warships throughout the remainder of the war would always retreat upon sighting spar torpedo boats. The Russian Lieutenants Dubasov and Shestakov were decorated with the Order of St. George, while Major Ioan Murgescu was decorated with the Order of Saint Vladimir as well as the Order of the Star of Romania. Rândunica was returned to full Romanian control in 1878, after the Russian ground forces had finished crossing the Danube.

== Aftermath ==
This engagement was the first instance in history when a torpedo craft sank its target without being sunk itself. The Ottomans lost a 400-ton ironclad warship, with a maximum armor thickness of 76 mm and armed with two 120 mm guns. She had a crew of 51.

Over half a century later, on 14 June 1939, Romania launched its first native-built warship, the minelaying destroyer escort Amiral Murgescu, named in the honor of Major Murgescu (he became the first Romanian Admiral after the war), who distinguished himself during this action and throughout the rest of the Russo-Turkish War.

This victory ingrained the spar torpedo within the Romanian naval doctrine for the decades to come. As late as 1906, Romania ordered a class of eight vessels armed with spar torpedoes, however they were also fitted with torpedo dropping gear (carriages) amidships.
