= John A. Hadden Jr. =

American socialite and clubman during the Glided Age

- Born: John Aspinwall Hadden Jr; March 31, 1858; New York City, New York, U.S.
- Died: February 6, 1931 (aged 72); London, England
- Spouse: Marie Torrance (m. 1892; death 1923)
- Parent(s): John Aspinwall Hadden; Frances Mactier
- Relatives: David Hadden (grandfather); Charles Alexander Tomes (cousin)

John Aspinwall Hadden Jr. (March 31, 1858 – February 6, 1931) was an American socialite and clubman during the Gilded Age.

== Early life ==
Hadden was born on March 31, 1858, in New York City. He was the eldest son of John Aspinwall Hadden (d. 1906) and Frances "Fanny" (née Mactier) Hadden. The family lived on Fifth Avenue between 35th and 36th Streets. He was the brother of Alexander Mactier Hadden, a close friend of Edward Coleman Delafield. His father, who collected war medals, was a veteran of the Seventh Regiment and a member of the New-York Historical Society, the American Geographical Society, and a life member of the American Numismatic Society.

His maternal grandfather was Alexander Mactier who lived in New York and Philadelphia. His paternal grandfather was David Hadden, a prominent New York Merchant who was born in Aberdeen, Scotland, and Ann (née Aspinwall) Hadden, the daughter of William Smith Aspinwall.

== Society life ==
In 1892, just a month before he married, Hadden was included in Ward McAllister's "Four Hundred", purported to be an index of New York's best families, published in The New York Times. Conveniently, 400 was the number of people that could fit into Mrs. Astor's ballroom.

Hadden was a member of the Union Club of the City of New York, the Riding Club and the Badminton Club. The Haddens donated funds to the Cooper Hewitt, Smithsonian Design Museum.

== Personal life ==
On March 10, 1892, Hadden was married to Marie Torrance (1858–1923), the daughter of Daniel Torrance and Sophia Johnson (née Vanderbilt) Torrance. Marie's paternal grandfather was merchant and entrepreneur John Torrance and her maternal grandfather was Commodore Cornelius Vanderbilt. Her brother Alfred Torrance was married to Louise Anthony, whom she later divorced to marry the Torrance cousin, Frederick William Vanderbilt. Her sister Adelaide Torrance was married Meredith Howland. John and Marie did not have any children.

His wife died in 1923. Hadden died of pneumonia on February 6, 1931, in London, England. He was buried alongside his wife in Woodlawn Cemetery in the Bronx.
