= H. De Courcy Forbes =

- Born: Henry De Courcy Forbes; February 24, 1849
- Died: July 1, 1920 (aged 71); Paris, France
- Education: Trinity Hall, Cambridge
- Parent(s): Paul Siemen Forbes; Valeria Medora Wright
- Relatives: William Howell Forbes (brother); Robert Bennet Forbes (uncle); John Murray Forbes (uncle)

Henry De Courcy Forbes (February 24, 1849 – July 1920) was an American attorney, clubman, and member of the Forbes family who was prominent in New York society during the Gilded Age.

== Early life ==
Forbes was born on February 24, 1849. He was the second son of Valeria Medora (née Wright) Forbes and Paul Siemen Forbes (1808–1886), who traveled to China in 1857 joined his cousin John Murray Forbes, the United States Consul in Canton who was a partner in Russell & Co., the largest American trading house in Qing dynasty China from the 1840s until its closing in 1891. He had two brothers, William Howell Forbes and Paul Revere Forbes; and a sister, Mary Elizabeth "Nellie" Forbes (1854–1932), who married Gaston Louis Philippe de Choiseul, the 6th Duke de Praslin, the son of Françoise, Duchess de Praslin and Charles de Choiseul-Praslin, the 5th Duke de Praslin, in 1874.

After his brother William's death in 1896, William's widow, the former Dora Delano (sister of Frederic Adrian Delano and Sara (née Delano) Roosevelt), married Henry's other brother, Paul.

His maternal grandparents were Eliza Lee (née Warner) Wright and Samuel Turbutt Wright, the 2nd Adjutant General of Maryland.

After his grandfather's early death in 1810, his grandmother remarried to Forbes' namesake, William Henry De Courcy Wright, the son of U.S. Senator and Governor of Maryland Robert Wright and Sarah (née De Courcy) Wright.

Forbes attended and graduated from Trinity Hall, Cambridge.

== Career ==
Following the family tradition, Forbes entered Russell & Co. as a director, serving as an attorney for his father.

While the firm had been extremely successful in the past, increased competition led to its decline. Russells attempted to rescue itself when it was about to bankrupt by founding the National Bank of China to draw some capital. Forbes, his brother William, and the Howqua family became founders of the Bank. S. W. Pomeroy, a Russell partner and former director of the Hongkong and Shanghai Bank, with other members of the company, criticized the Forbes brothers for sponsoring the new Bank which the Hongkong and Shanghai Bank viewed as rival.

This led to further curtailment of credit to Russell & Co., forcing the firm to sell its assets resulting in a full collapse on June 9, 1891. The business was acquired by two of its employees, Robert Shewan and Alexander Charles Tomes, who renamed the firm Shewan, Tomes & Co. in 1895.

=== Society life ===
In 1892, Forbes was included in Ward McAllister's "Four Hundred", purported to be an index of New York's best families, published in The New York Times. Conveniently, 400 was the number of people that could fit into Mrs. Astor's ballroom.

Forbes was heavily interested in horse racing and was a prominent member of the New York Jockey Club when Pierre Lorillard and James R. Keene were racing horses. He served as a director of the National Horse-Show Association of America.

== Personal life ==
Forbes, who did not marry, lived at the Knickerbocker Club in New York City. He died at the home of his brother Paul, 37 Avenue de l'Alma, in Paris in July 1920.
