= Lilias Mackinnon =

Scottish pianist

Lilias Mackinnon LRAM
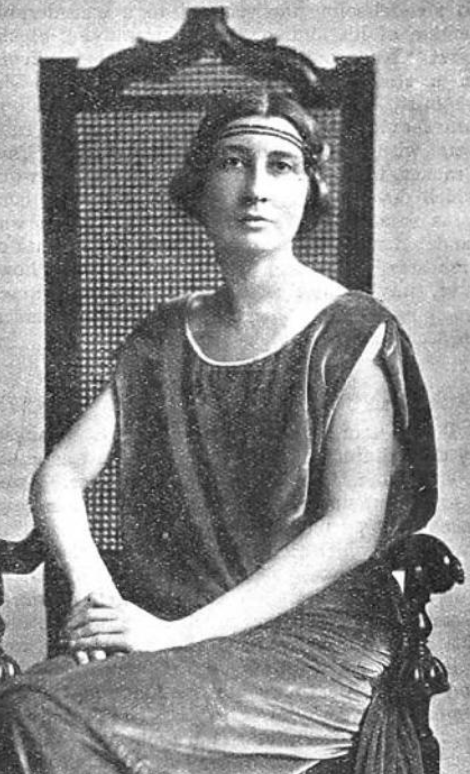
- Lilias Mackinnon, from a 1923 publication
- Born: 20 April 1889; Aberdeen, Scotland
- Died: 1974 (aged 84–85)
- Other name: Lillias L. Harley
- Occupations: Pianist, lecturer, writer, educator
- Relatives: Doris Mackinnon (sister); Esther Blaikie MacKinnon (sister); George Thompson (great-grandfather); Aileen Fox (cousin)

Lilias Livingstone Mackinnon LRAM (20 April 1889 – 1974) was a Scottish pianist and music educator.

== Early life and education ==
Mackinnon was born in Aberdeen, the daughter of Lachlan Mackinnon and Theodora Thompson. Her father was a lawyer and a consular agent, and her mother ran a home for unemployed women. Her older sisters were zoologist Doris Mackinnon and artist Esther Blaikie MacKinnon. Her great-grandfather was shipowner George Thompson.

She studied piano with Julian Rossetti, and with Carlo Albanesi at the Royal Academy of Music (RAM). She won the Macfarren Gold Medal at the RAM in 1916. She also studied with Tobias Matthay.

== Career ==
=== Pianist ===
In Mackinnon gave concerts of piano works by Scriabin in London, beginning in 1917. In 1918 she joined Mary Ramsay and Oscar Beringer for a benefit concert of works to two pianos, at London's Aeolian Hall. In 1933 she played at the BBC Proms concerts at Queen's Hall. Her cousin, archaeologist Aileen Fox, remembered seeing a concert by Mackinnon at Wigmore Hall. She toured Canada and the United States several times in the 1930s.

Critics generally praised Mackinnon's technique and choice of programme, though Scriabin was considered quite "futuristic" in the 1920s. Ezra Pound described her playing as having "a fluid, not an architecture manner; it is not a confusion." The Guardian expressed admiration for her charm and intelligent choices in 1932, but some disappointment at her restraint, when "something more of audacity is wanted." The Oakland Tribune's critic highlighted her "meticulous taste" and "refined and poetic sensibility".

=== Lecturer, writer, arts patron ===
Mackinnon devised her own method of memorising piano music, which she taught by correspondence. In 1935, she conducted a summer music school in St. Andrews. She wrote Music by Heart (1938), "the only non-technical book in English devoted primarily to memorization", and "a classic", according to a 1955 review.

During World War II, Mackinnon taught at Dominican College in California, and at Bradley Polytechnic Institute in Illinois. She lectured on musical memory in Chicago in 1942, in New York in 1945, and at a piano clinic in North Carolina in 1956. Composer Nancy Laird Chance was one of her students.

Alexander Stuart-Hill painted Mackinnon's portrait in about 1920; she donated that painting to the Perth Art Gallery. Maurice Besly dedicated a 1928 composition to Mackinnon. She also donated some of her sister's art to the Smithsonian American Art Museum.

== Publications ==
- Musical Secrets (1936)
- Music by Heart (1938)

== Personal life ==
Mackinnon married a younger American man, William P. Harley, in 1959. They divorced in 1965. She died in 1974, in her eighties.
