= NMS Rândunica =

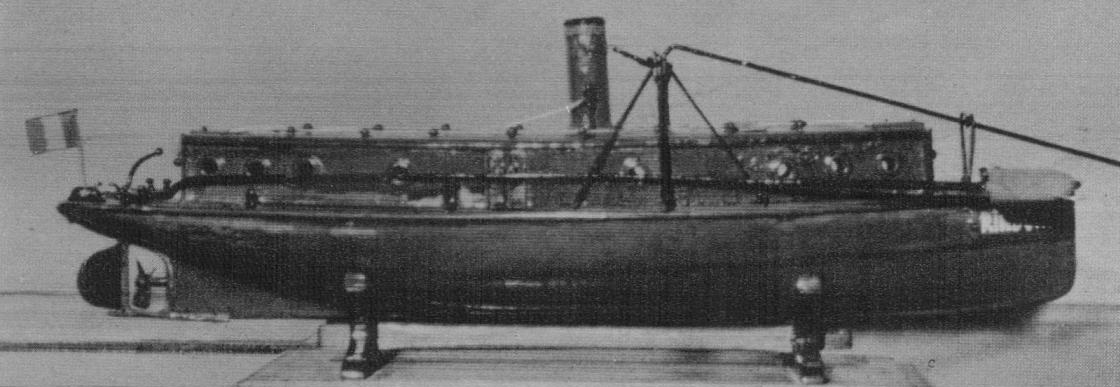
- Rândunica after her 1900 refit (model)

History

Romania
- Name: Rândunica
- Builder: Yarrow and Company, Poplar, United Kingdom
- Laid down: 1875
- Launched: 1875
- Commissioned: 1875
- Decommissioned: 1925
- Refit: 1900, Galați shipyard
- Fate: Scrapped in 1984 at Tulcea

Service record
- Commanders: Major Murgescu (Romanian War of Independence); Aurel Negulescu (World War I)
- Victories: 1 monitor and 1 barge sunk

General characteristics
- Type: Spar torpedo boat
- Displacement: 10 tons
- Length: 14 m (45 ft 11 in)
- Beam: 2.40 m (7 ft 10 in)
- Draft: 1 m (3 ft 3 in)
- Propulsion: 1 steam engine, 1 shaft
- Speed: 8 knots (15 km/h; 9.2 mph)
- Complement: 5
- Armament: 1877: 1 spar torpedo; 1916: 2 torpedoes

NMS Rândunica (English: "The Swallow") was the first torpedo boat of the Romanian Navy. A small British-built spar torpedo boat, she was commissioned in 1875 and fought during the Romanian War of Independence and during World War I.

== Construction and specifications ==
Rândunica was built by Yarrow and Company in the United Kingdom, and was commissioned two years before the start of the Romanian War of Independence. During the war, she was armed with a single spar torpedo. In 1900, she was rebuilt at the Galați shipyard in Romania, having the following specifications: displacement of 10 tons, length of 14 meters, beam of 2.40 meters, draught of 1 meter, top speed of 8 knots and crew of 5.

== Service ==
=== Romanian War of Independence ===
In 1877, during the Romanian War of Independence, according to a Russian-Romanian treaty signed in April that year, Rândunica served under joint Romanian-Russian command. She was also known as Tsarevich by the Russians. Her crew consisted of a Russian Lieutenant, Dubasov, three Romanians: Major Murgescu (the official liaison officer with the Russian headquarters), engine mechanic Vasile Belea, navigator Gheorghe Constantinescu and another 10 sailors. The attack of Rândunica took place during the night of 25–26 May 1877, near Măcin. As she was approaching the Ottoman monitor Seyfi, the latter fired three rounds at her without any effect. Before she could fire the fourth round, Rândunica's spar struck her between the midships and the stern. A powerful explosion followed, with debris from the Ottoman warship raising up to 40 meters in the air. The half-sunk monitor then re-opened fire, but was struck once again by another torpedo boat, with the same devastating effects. The crew of Seyfi subsequently fired their rifles at Rândunica, as the latter was retreating and their monitor was sinking. Following this action, Ottoman warships throughout the remainder of the war would always retreat upon sighting spar torpedo boats. The Russian Lieutenants Dubasov and Shestakov were decorated with the Order of St. George, while Major Murgescu was decorated with the Order of Saint Vladimir as well as the Order of the Star of Romania. Rândunica was returned to full Romanian control in 1878, after the Russian ground forces had finished crossing the Danube.

The Ottoman monitor Seyfi was a 400-ton ironclad warship, with a maximum armor thickness of 76 mm and armed with two 120 mm guns.

=== World War I ===
Rândunica was modernized in 1900 at the Galați shipyard, most notably being fitted with a superstructure for better crew living conditions.

On 27 August 1916, just after Romania declared war on Austria-Hungary, Rândunica attacked the Austro-Hungarian Danube Flotilla stationed in the Bulgarian port of Ruse. Commanded by Captain Aurel Negulescu, she was fitted with two torpedoes in wooden tubes. In the evening of 27 August, she launched her two torpedoes at one of the Austro-Hungarian monitors, but only one barge loaded with fuel was struck, which exploded and sank. The Austro-Hungarian warships subsequently retreated 130 km West along the Danube, stopping at Belene and taking extensive defensive measures.

She was decommissioned in 1925, later benefitting from three more reconstructions, one in 1928, one in 1951 and one in 1972. She was cut up in Tulcea, after an attempt to be brought to the Romanian Navy Museum in 1984.
