= Edgar Davidson =

Hong Kong solicitor

Edgar Davidson was a Hong Kong solicitor and member of the Legislative Council of Hong Kong.

He was a solicitor and of the Hastings & Co. firm. He was appointed to the Legislative Council in 1936 and 1937. He was held as a prisoner of war in the Stanley Internment Camp during the Japanese occupation of Hong Kong.

Legislative Council of Hong Kong
Preceded by Stanley Hudson Dodwell	Unofficial Member; 1936	Succeeded by Stanley Hudson Dodwell
Preceded by Stanley Hudson Dodwell	Unofficial Member; 1937	Succeeded by Stanley Hudson Dodwell
Preceded by Stanley Hudson Dodwell	Unofficial Member; 1941	Japanese occupation of Hong Kong
