= David Torrance (banker) =

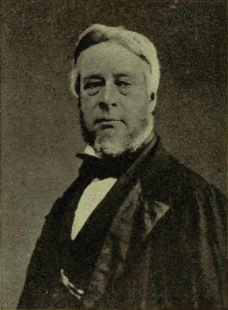
- Born: 1805; New York City, New York, U.S.
- Died: January 29, 1876 (aged 70–71); Montreal, Quebec, Canada
- Spouse: Jane Torrance (m. 1832; died 1875)

David Torrance (1805 – January 29, 1876) was a Canadian merchant, shipper, and president of the Bank of Montreal.

== Early life ==
Torrance was born in 1805 in New York City, the son of James Torrance. His father was one of five Torrance brothers who emigrated to Canada from Lanarkshire, Scotland, early in the 19th century.

His uncles, Thomas Torrance (1776–1826) and John Torrance (1786–1870), settled at Montreal as wholesale and retail grocers and winesellers. His father James went to Kingston, Upper Canada, as agent for the family.

== Career ==
Around 1821, Torrance came to Montreal to work for his uncle at John Torrance and Co. In 1833, Torrance became a partner in the business of his uncle (and father-in-law), John Torrance and Co. When his uncle John Torrance retired in 1853, the firm became David Torrance and Co., with Thomas Cramp and later his own son, John Torrance (1835–1908) as partners. With Cramp and another son, George William Torrance, he formed a second partnership in Toronto, Cramp, Torrances, and Co. The businesses traded in general goods, but especially tea. The Torrances were the first Canadians to import tea directly from China and India. When David Torrance died in 1876, the value of David Torrance and Co. in Montreal was estimated at between $400,000 and $500,000.

Torrance was also a shipowner and a major shareholder in the Bank of Montreal, of which his uncle Thomas had been one of the first shareholders and a director. His uncle John succeeded Thomas and was a director of the bank until 1857, and in 1853 David Torrance joined the board. In 1873, a vacancy arose for president, and Torrance was the second longest-serving director after Senator Thomas Ryan, who declined to take on the office. The board by then included Torrance's brother-in-law, Alexander Tilloch Galt, and Torrance was elected as president.

Torrance was a supporter of educational causes and in 1843 was a leading founder of the High School of Montreal.

Torrance was a signer of the Montreal Annexation Manifesto in 1849.

== Personal life ==
On January 9, 1832, he married his cousin Jane Torrance (1812–1875), daughter of John.

== Notes ==
Business positions
| Preceded by Edwin Henry King | President of the Bank of Montreal; 1873-1876 | Succeeded by George Stephen |
