= Robert Tomes =

American diplomat

- Born: March 27, 1817; New York City, U.S.
- Died: August 28, 1882 (aged 65); Brooklyn, New York, U.S.
- Education: Washington College; University of Edinburgh
- Occupations: Mesical doctor, diplomat, writer
- Spouse: Catherine Fasnet
- Children: 3
- Relatives: Charles Alexander Tomes (nephew)

Robert Tomes (March 27, 1817 – August 28, 1882) was an American medical doctor, diplomat and writer.

== Early life ==
Tomes was born in New York City on March 27, 1817. He was a son of Maria (née Roberts) Tome and Francis Tomes Sr., who was born in Chipping Campden, England, and was the founder of Francis Tomes & Sons. Two of his brothers, Charles and Francis Jr. (father of Charles Alexander Tomes), married sisters, Isabella and Eleanor Hadden, both daughters of Scottish-born merchant David Hadden.

He attended Columbia Grammar School in New York, and Washington College (now Trinity College) in Hartford, Connecticut, in 1835. After one year at the University of Pennsylvania Medical School, he continued his medical studies at the University of Edinburgh, where he received his MD degree in 1840.

== Career ==
After studying further in Paris, he moved back to New York to start his medical practice. Beginning to write around 1853, Tomes gradually relinquished his medical business and became a writer.

On his return to the United States, Tomes settled in the practice of his profession in New York, but after a few years was appointed surgeon on a vessel belonging to the Pacific Mail Steamship Company, and made several voyages between Panama and San Francisco.

In 1865, Tomes was appointed U.S. Consul at Rheims, France, which office he filled until 1867. Returning to the United States, he spent most of his life in literary occupation.

== Personal life ==
Tomes married Catherine Fasnet of Wiesbaden, Germany. The family lived in New York City, Wiesbaden, Germany, and Rheims, France, and Catherine and Robert were the parents of one daughter and two sons, including:

- Catherine Tomes (1860–1922), who died unmarried.
- Arthur Lloyd Tomes (1863–1920), a prominent lawyer with the firm of Tomes, Sherk & Palmer.
- Dr. William Austin Tomes (1865–1920), a well-known gynecologist.

He died at his residence in Brooklyn, New York, on August 28, 1882. After a funeral at Calvary Church on Fourth Avenue, he was buried at Trinity Church Cemetery in New York. His widow, who did not remarry, died many years later on August 11, 1923, and was also buried at Trinity Church Cemetery.

== Published works ==
Tomes wrote for journals and magazines (his series of papers in Harper's Magazine on American manners and society were widely popular), and he also translated works from French and German. He published:

- The Bourbon Prince (New York, 1853);
- Richard the Lion-Hearted (1854);
- Oliver Cromwell (1855);
- Panama in 1855 (1855);
- The Americans in Japan (1857);
- The Battles of America by Sea and Land (3 vols., 1861);
- The Champagne Country (1867);
- The War with the South: a History of the Great American Rebellion (3 vols., 1864–1867; and the German translation, 2 vols., 1864–1867);
- My College Days (1880)
