= Edward Shellim =

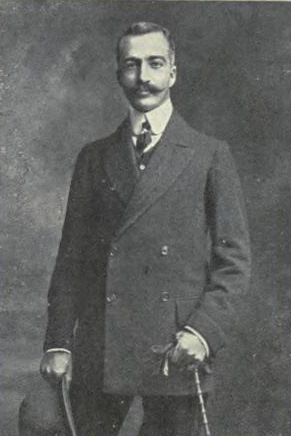

Unofficial Member of the Legislative Council of Hong Kong
- In office 6 March 1913 – 31 December 1918
- Appointed by: Sir Francis Henry May
- Preceded by: Edward Osborne
- Succeeded by: Robert Shewan

Chairman of the Hongkong & Shanghai Banking Corporation
- In office February 1912 – February 1913
- Preceded by: Hebert Edmund Tomkins
- Succeeded by: F. H. Armstong

Personal details
- Born: 1869 Sussex, England
- Died: 7 December 1928 (aged 59) Brighton, England
- Spouse: née Howard
- Occupation: Businessman

Edward Shellim (c. 1869 – 7 December 1928) was an English Jewish businessman in Hong Kong.

== Biography ==
Born in Sussex, England to Ezekiel Shellim and Rebecca Sassoon, daughter of David Sassoon, he joined his grandfather's firm David Sassoon & Co., one of the oldest trading houses in Hong Kong, and was the manager of the Hong Kong branch of the firm. He was also chairman of the Hongkong and Shanghai Banking Corporation in 1908 and 1912 and served as director of the bank for many years, director of the Hong Kong Tramways, the Hong Kong Land Investment & Agency Co., the Hong Kong Land Reclamation Co., the Central Estates, the Hong Kong & Kowloon Wharf & Godown Co. and member of the consulting committee of the China Sugar Refining Co., the Hong Kong Fire Insurance Co. and the Canton Insurance Office.

He was member of the Shanghai Municipal Council in 1898 and member of the Shanghai Chamber of Commerce. During his residence in Hong Kong, he was made Justice of Peace and appointed an unofficial member of the Legislative Council of Hong Kong from 1913 to 1918. He was also elected member of the Licensing Board. He served on the committee of the Hong Kong General Chamber of Commerce and the Sailors' Home and was the chairman of the financial committee of the Alice Memorial Hospital, president of the Ohel Leah Synagogue and member of the Court of the University of Hong Kong.

Shellim retired in 1918 from the manager of the David Sassoon & Co. and succeeded by A. H. Compton. He lived in Shanghai for a short period of time after retirement and then settled in England.

He died on 7 December 1928 while riding his horse at Devil's Dyke, Brighton at the age of 59 and left Hong Kong estate worth $539,100 and England £53,165. He married Miss Howard, the daughter of another former manager of the firm and had a daughter named Luna Eryl Valerie.

Business positions
Preceded by Hebert Edmund Tomkins	Chairman of the Hongkong and Shanghai Banking Corporation; 1912–1913	Succeeded by F. H. Armstong
Legislative Council of Hong Kong
Preceded by Edward Osborne	Unofficial Member; 1913–1918	Succeeded by Robert Gordon Shewan
