= Arrubium =

- Castra of Măcin; Arrubio
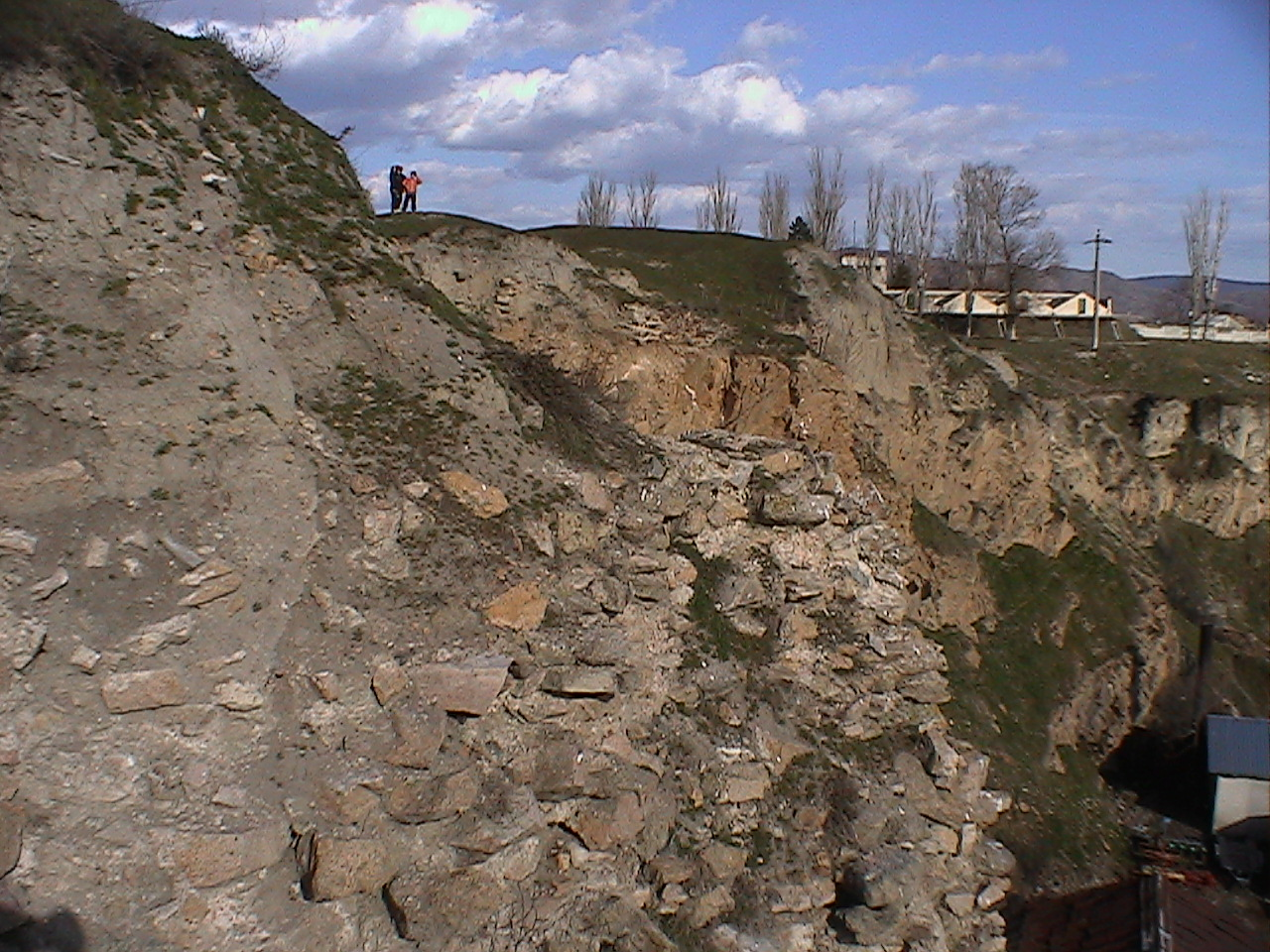

- Location within Romania
- 45.2388°N 28.1277°E
- Location: Măcin, Tulcea, Romania

Site notes
- Elevation: 17 m (56 ft)
- Condition: Ruined

Arrubium was a fort in the Roman province of Moesia (today's Măcin, Romania), (later Scythia Minor) and was part of the defensive frontier system of the Moesian Limes along the Danube.

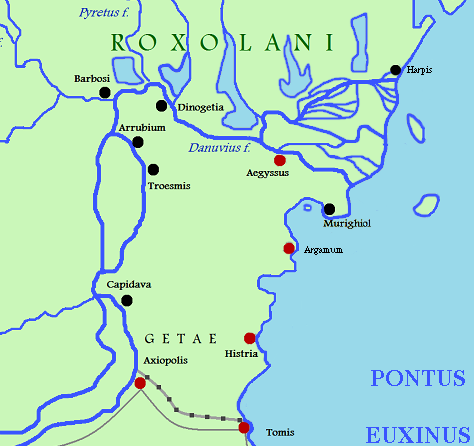
Eastern Moesia around 100 AD

== See also ==
- List of castra
