= Agnes Murgoci =

British folklorist

- Born: Agnes Kelly; 1875; Adelaide, South Australia
- Died: 7 May 1929 (aged 53–54); Isle of Wight, England
- Education: Dollar Academy
- Alma mater: Bedford College, London; Ludwig-Maximilians-Universität München
- Employer: King Edward VI High School for Girls
- Organization(s): Bucharest Science Society; The Folklore Society
- Spouse: Gheorghe Munteanu-Murgoci (m. 1904, d. 1925)
- Children: 2

Dr. Agnes Murgoci (née Kelly, 1875 – 7 May 1929), was an Australian-born, English zoologist, folklorist and teacher. She is most known for her work on Romanian folklore, especially early studies on vampirism.

== Biography ==
Agnes Kelly was born in Adelaide, South Australia in 1875. She was the daughter of Adam Kelly, formerly of Glasgow, Scotland, and Helen Kelly (née Beveridge), formerly of Dunfermline, Fife, Scotland. Her mother returned to Britain with Agnes, when she was three years old. Her father moved to Auckland, New Zealand.

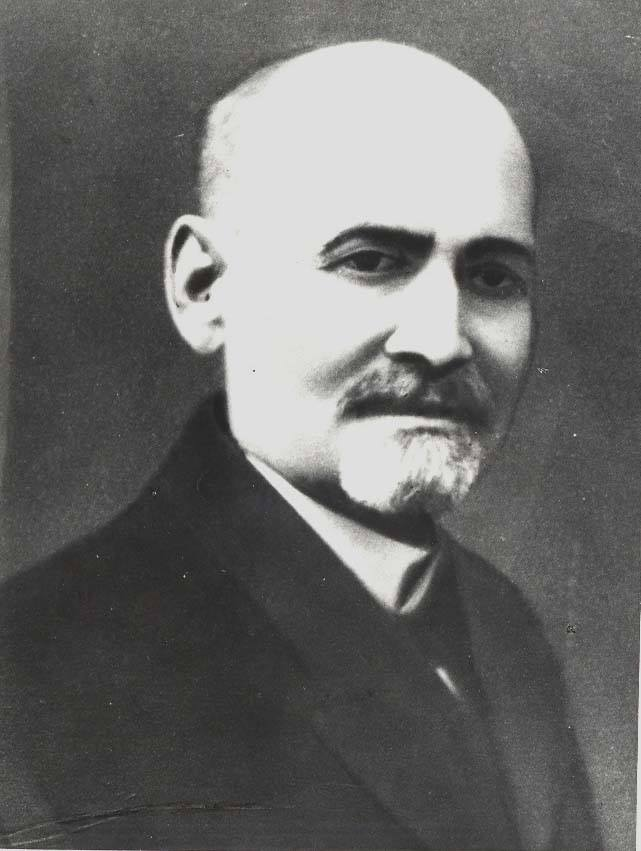
Her husband, Gheorghe Munteanu-Murgoci

Kelly attended school at Dollar Academy and entered Bedford College, London in 1892, the beneficiary of a scholarship. She graduated in 1896, obtaining her B.Sc. with first class honours in zoology. She also was awarded the Weldon Gold Medal. After graduating, she taught at King Edward VIII High School for Girls in Birmingham, England.

Kelly moved to Germany to undertake a PhD at the Ludwig-Maximilians-Universität München. She graduated alongside Maria Gordon, as the first women to obtain a PhD from the Ludwig-Maximilians-Universität München in 1900.

Kelly met Gheorghe Munteanu-Murgoci, a Romanian professor of mineralogy and geology, during her time in Munich. They married in 1904 and went on a long trip to the United States together. They moved to Bucharest, Romania. Their children, Helen and Radu-Maxwell were both born in Romania. They both became members of the Bucharest Science Society.

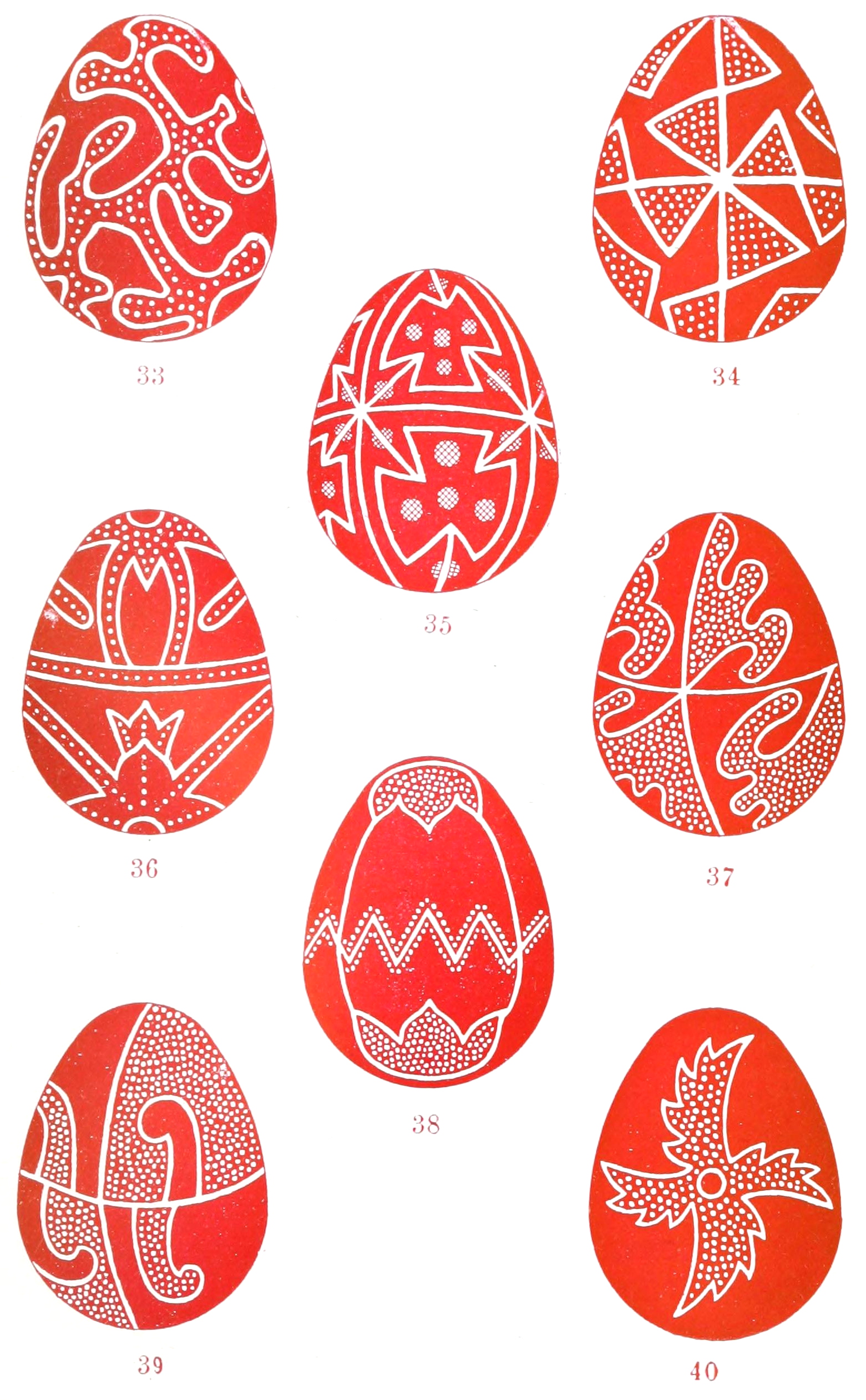
illustration to 'Roumanian Easter Eggs' Folk-Lore, vol. 20

Murgoci published articles on the folklore of her new home of Romania, especially early studies on vampirism, and a book titled Rumania and the Rumanians (1918). Her works also appeared in the journal of the Folklore Society.

In 1926, Murgoci recorded that Romanian vampire lore claimed that vampires can take on sizes which allow them to enter a house through a keyhole and also held that vampires could take milk from nursing mothers and cows. She also noted that in the Romanian language the words strigoi and moroii were the most commonly used for vampires in folklore and made translations into English of legends. She noted that the Ruthenian word for a dead vampire was oper.

In 1927, Murgoci read a paper to the Folklore Society on vampirism.

During World War I, Murgoci and her children took refuge in Iași, then fled to England and settled in Bristol. She made Bristol an important centre for information on Romanian culture, gave talks and conferences, and also returned to teaching.

Murgoci's husband died in 1925. Murgoci died in England on 7 May 1929, following a car accident on the Isle of Wight.

== Legacy ==
Murgoci collected many traditional Romanian peasant costumes and rugs. These were donated to the Scottish National Museum by her daughter as the Murgoci collection. Her papers are held in the Royal Holloway, University of London archives.
