= Robert Shewan =

Robert Gordon Shewan
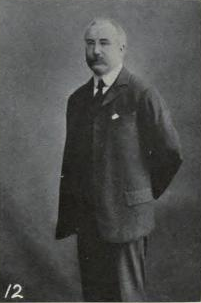

Member of the Legislative Council of Hong Kong
- In office 23 June 1902 – 7 December 1905
- Appointed by: Sir Henry Arthur Blake
- Preceded by: T. H. Whitehead
- Succeeded by: E. A. Hewett
- In office 25 May 1917 – 27 December 1917
- Appointed by: Sir Francis Henry May
- Preceded by: Edward Shellim
- In office 1 January 1919 – 23 December 1919
- Preceded by: Edward Shellim
- Succeeded by: S. H. Dodwell

Chairman of the Hongkong & Shanghai Banking Corporation
- In office February 1902 – February 1903
- Preceded by: James Johnstone Keswick
- Succeeded by: A. J. Raymond

Personal details
- Born: 13 November 1859 London, England
- Died: 14 February 1934 (aged 74) British Hong Kong
- Resting place: Hong Kong Cemetery
- Spouse: Dorothy "Dolly"
- Occupation: Businessman

Robert Gordon Shewan (13 November 1859 – 14 February 1934) was a Scottish businessman in Hong Kong.

== Early life ==
Robert and his twin brother William were born in London on 13 November 1859. They were sons of Andrew Shewan (1820–1873), a master mariner, and Jane (née Thomson) Shewan (1822–1886).

== Career ==
Shewan arrived in Hong Kong in 1881, in the employ of Russell & Company, which was then one of the largest mercantile companies in the Far East. He and Charles Alexander Tomes, who was a grandson of merchant David Hadden, acquired the infrastructure of that firm subsequent to its dissolution in 1891, and consequently created Shewan, Tomes & Co. in 1895. The new company formed the Green Island Cement Company and the China Light and Power Company, which generated electricity for Kowloon. He was subsequently dismissed from the latter by its principal shareholder, the Kadoorie family. Shewan was also the director of the Hongkong and Shanghai Banking Corporation and of many other local companies.

In 1902, Shewan was elected as the representative of the Hong Kong General Chamber of Commerce in the Legislative Council. He also served as Consul for Chile at Hong Kong. Shewan was unsympathetic to the Canton-Hong Kong strike in 1925: he told the Daily Press that employers should punish those of their Chinese labourers who went on strike. He also posted a notice to his office clerks that stated that those who left and did not return by the next morning would be permanently dismissed.

== Personal life ==
Shewan was married to Dorothy "Dolly" Kate Lucas (d. 1961), who was a daughter of William Lucas and former wife of James Marke Wood.

Shewan died on 14 February 1934. He was buried at the Hong Kong Cemetery in Happy Valley, Hong Kong.

Business positions
Preceded by James Johnstone Keswick	Chairman of Hongkong and Shanghai Banking Corporation; 1902–1903	Succeeded by A. J. Raymond
Legislative Council of Hong Kong
Preceded by Thomas Henderson Whitehead	Unofficial Member; Representative for Hong Kong General Chamber of Commerce; 1902–1905	Succeeded by Edbert Ansgar Hewett
Preceded by Henry Edward Pollock	Unofficial Member; 1917	Succeeded by Edward Shellim
Preceded by Edward Shellim	Unofficial Member; 1919	Succeeded by Stanley Hudson Dodwell
