= Doris Mackinnon =

British zoologist (1883–1956)

- Born: 30 September 1883; Aberdeen, Scotland
- Died: 10 September 1956 (aged 72); Chelsea, London, England
- Scientific career
- Fields: Zoology; protozoology
- Workplaces: University College, Dundee; King's College London
- Thesis: Studies on protozoa

Doris Mackinnon (30 September 1883 – 10 September 1956) was a Scottish zoologist and academic. Her area of research was parasitic protozoa.

In 1927, she was appointed as Chair of Zoology at King's College London becoming the first woman at the College to hold the position of Chair.

== Biography ==
Doris Livingston Mackinnon was born on 30 September 1883 in Aberdeen, Scotland. Her father, Lachlan Mackinnon, was an advocate and Consular Agent for France and Belgium. In his spare time, her father was an amateur scientist, interested in botany, ornithology and astronomy. Her mother, Theodora Thompson Mackinnon, granddaughter of George Thompson, founded and managed a "women's home" for unemployed women. Mackinnon had three siblings. One sister was a silhouette artist while the other, Lilias Mackinnon, was a concert pianist. A brother was an author.

Encouraged by the geologist and paleontologist Maria Gordon, Mackinnon studied botany and geology at the University of Aberdeen. In 1906, she graduated with a BSc with distinction. She was awarded the "Carnegie scholarship" which enabled her to study for a year under Richard Hertwig in Munich. Afterward, she joined Milano Vlès to research at Station biologique de Roscoff in France, and then relocated to the Quick Laboratory, at the University of Cambridge, under George Nuttall. Mackinnon returned to Aberdeen in 1908, where she was an assistant to John Arthur Thomson at the University of Aberdeen. In 1909, she became an assistant to D'Arcy Thompson at University College, Dundee. While there, she worked on her thesis "Studies on protozoa", which she submitted to the University of Aberdeen in 1914, receiving her doctorate. Within two years, in 1916, Mackinnon was promoted to lecturer in Dundee.

"An inspiring teacher, rapid but always lucid in exposition, she had a natural dignity and a touch of the grand manner which at all times commanded respect and attention and which could, on occasions, give devastating force to a well deserved reprimand.'"

— The Times obituary

While at Dundee, Mackinnon was given a leave of absence to assist with the war effort during World War I. She worked in military hospitals in Liverpool and Southampton, where she used her knowledge of protozoology to help diagnose amoebic dysentery and other infections for the War Office. In 1918, she was recalled to University College, Dundee, because D'Arcy Thompson had taken a new role at the University of St Andrews. Mackinnon became the acting head of the University's zoological department.

In 1919, Mackinnon joined King's College London as a lecturer under Arthur Dendy. She was promoted to reader two years later. When Julian Huxley resigned as Chair of Zoology in 1927, Mackinnon stepped up to the role which held also the title of Professor. In doing so, Mackinnon became the first female chair at King's College. She remained Chair until her retirement in 1949. Her department produced notable academics such as Francis Brambell.

After retiring, Mackinnon worked on an undergraduate textbook, "An introduction to the study of protozoa". She fell ill before it was published, and died from a stroke on 10 September 1956. The book was completed and edited by R. S. J. Hawes.

== Work ==
Doris Mackinnon with two students in 1943

Between May 1917 and May 1918, Mackinnon worked at the University War Hospital in Southampton with William Fletcher from the Royal Army Medical Corps, focusing on the diagnosis and treatment of dysentery. The pair focused on two forms of Shigella dysenteriae which had been identified by Simon Flexner and Kiyoshi Shiga. They discovered that the Flexner bacillus could go into intermission and be undetectable for periods of four to five weeks, making it very difficult to say when someone was no longer a carrier. They also found that men who were carriers of Shiga's bacillus would be prone to depression and would be no longer fit to be soldiers.

Mackinnon published over 40 academic papers, primarily on parasitic species of protozoa (especially flagellates and sporozoa). She had a reputation for her skill as a lecturer, which stemmed from her time at University College, Dundee. Mackinnon gave broadcast talks for schools and numerous lectures, with a reputation that she never repeated a lecture in 30 years of teaching. These included lectures on the diseases spread by flies, and how good hygiene and the prevention of flies breeding could stop typhoid. She also set up a research centre in protozoology, the only non-medical protozoological research centre in UK.

== Recognition ==
During the 1930s, two genus of protozoa, Dorisa and Dorisiella, were named after Mackinnon in recognition of her work. In 1943, for the 50th anniversary of their first women's admissions, the University of Aberdeen awarded Mackinnon and two other women an honorary LLD. When Mackinnon retired in 1949, she was elected professor emeritus of King's College. She became a fellow of the Linnean Society of London and served on their council.

== Selected bibliography ==
Books

- Mackinnon, D. L.; Hawes, R. S. J. (1961). An introduction to the study of protozoa. Oxford: Clarendon Press.

Journals articles

- Mackinnon, D. L. (22 March 1909). "The optical properties of the contractile elements in heliozoa". The Journal of Physiology. 38 (4): 254–258. doi:10.1113/jphysiol.1909.sp001301. PMC 1533641. PMID 16992949.
- Mackinnon, D. L. (September 1909). "Note on two new Flagellate Parasites in Fleas—Herpetomonas ctenophthalmi, n. sp., and Crithidia hystrighopsyllae, n. sp". Parasitology. 2 (3): 288–296. doi:10.1017/S0031182000001736. S2CID 85157434.
- Mackinnon, D. L. (September 1909). "Observations on the Effect of Various Chemical Reagents on the Morphology of Spirochaetes". Parasitology. 2 (3): 281–287. doi:10.1017/S0031182000001724. S2CID 86680277.
- Mackinnon, D. L. (September 1909). "Observations on the Division of Spirochaetes". Parasitology. 2 (3): 267–280. doi:10.1017/S0031182000001712. S2CID 85728032.
- Mackinnon, D. L. (September 1910). "Herpetomonads from the Alimentary Tract of certain Dung-Flies". Parasitology. 3 (3): 255–274. doi:10.1017/S0031182000002080. S2CID 85597791.
- Mackinnon, D. L. (September 1910). "New Protist Parasites from the Intestine of Trichoptera". Parasitology. 3 (3): 245–254. doi:10.1017/S0031182000002079. S2CID 86206559.
- Mackinnon, D. L. (March 1911). "On some more protozoan parasites from Trichoptera". Parasitology. 4 (1): 28–38. doi:10.1017/S0031182000002432. S2CID 84309646.
- Mackinnon, D. L. (September 1912). "Protists Parasitic in the Larva of the Crane-Fly, Tipula sp". Parasitology. 5 (3): 175–189. doi:10.1017/S0031182000000275. S2CID 86753625.
- Mackinnon, D. L. (1915). "Studies on Parasitic Protozoa. III (a). Notes on the Flagellate Embadomonas. (b.) The Multiplication Cysts of a Trichomastigine". Quarterly Journal of Microscopical Science. 61 (1): 105–118.
- Mackinnon, D. L. (1915). "Studies on Parasitic Protozoa". Journal of Cell Science. 2 (61): 105–118. doi:10.1242/jcs.s2-61.241.105.
- Stephens, J. W. W.; Mackinnon, D. L. (8 February 1917). "A Preliminary Statement on the Treatment of Entamoeba histolytica Infections by " Alcresta Ipecac."". Annals of Tropical Medicine and Parasitology. 10 (4): 397–410. doi:10.1080/00034983.1917.11684120.
- Mackinnon, D. L.; Carter, Henry F.; J.R., Matthews; Smith, A. Malins (30 June 1917). "Protozoological Investigation of Cases of Dysentery conducted at the Liverpool School of Tropical Medicine. (Second Report)". Annals of Tropical Medicine and Parasitology. 11 (1): 27–68. doi:10.1080/00034983.1917.11684124.
- Warrington, Yorke; Carter, Henry F.; Mackinnon, D. L.; Matthews, J.R.; Smith, A.Malins (30 June 1917). "Persons who have never been out of Great Britain as Carriers of Entamoeba histolytica". Annals of Tropical Medicine and Parasitology. 11 (1): 87–90. doi:10.1080/00034983.1917.11684128.
- Mackinnon, D. L.; Adams, D. Ines (1924). "Notes on Sporozara Parasitic in Tubifex". Journal of Cell Science. 2 (68): 187–210. doi:10.1242/jcs.s2-68.270.187.
- Mackinnon, D. L. (October 1937). "A Coccidian from the eggs of Thalassema neptuni Gaertner". Parasitology. 29 (4): 457–468. doi:10.1017/S0031182000024999. S2CID 83654450.
- Mackinnon, D. L.; Phillips, Nada E. (January 1946). "Observations on a monocystid gregarine, Apolocystis elongata n.sp., in the seminal vesicles of Eisenia foetida (Sav.)". Parasitology. 37 (2): 65–74. doi:10.1017/S0031182000013172. PMID 21014252. S2CID 39950184.
