= Charles Alexander Tomes =

American merchant (1854-1933)

- Born: October 25, 1854; New York City, U.S.
- Died: July 28, 1933 (aged 78); Lossiemouth, Scotland
- Education: Harvard University
- Spouse: Harriot Constance Budd Hancock (after 1890)
- Children: 5
- Relatives: Edward Baldwin, 4th Earl Baldwin of Bewdley (grandson); David Hadden (grandfather); Robert Tomes (uncle)

Charles Alexander Tomes (October 25, 1854 – July 28, 1933) was an American merchant in the Far East in the employment of Shewan, Tomes & Co.

== Early life ==
C. A. Tomes was born on October 25, 1854, in New York City. He was the eldest son of Eleanor Tomes (née Hadden) (1820–1894), and Francis Tomes Jr. (1813–1898), who was a prominent merchant who owned until 1877 a large Victorian mansion, on Putnam Avenue in Greenwich, Connecticut, that had been designed by Calvert Vaux with a landscape design by Frederick Law Olmsted.

His paternal grandparents were Maria (née Roberts) Tome, and Francis Tomes Sr., who was born in Chipping Campden, England. His uncle was Robert Tomes, a physician and diplomat. His maternal grandparents were Ann (née Aspinwall) Hadden and David Hadden, a prosperous Scottish born merchant who lived in New York for most of his life.

He attended St. John's School in Sing Sing, New York, and, subsequently, Harvard University, from which he graduated in 1871.

== Career ==
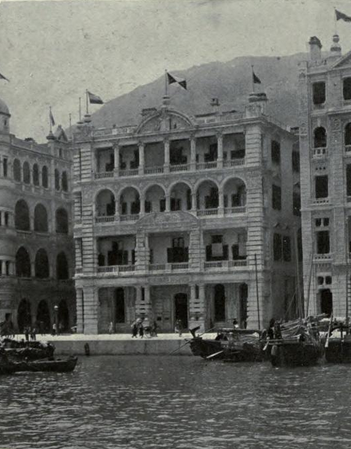
St. George Building, head office of the Shewan, Tomes & Co. with the flag of the firm hoisted around 1908.

Tomes' father ran the family's importing business, Francis Tomes & Co., which his grandfather had started in 1815 and managed until the 1940s. He was admitted to his father's firm at 6 Maiden Lane in New York in October 1877. During the economic crash of the 1870s, the business, which had thrived through the U.S. Civil War, went bankrupt. Between 1887 and 1888, he made a trip around the world, before moving to Shanghai, and later Hong Kong, with a letter of recommendation from John Murray Forbes.

In 1879, he began working for Russell & Company in Hong Kong, then one of the largest mercantile firms in the Far East. In 1885, he was admitted as a partner. Russell & Company went out of business in 1891 bankrupt in 1892. Tomes and Robert Shewan, both former employees of Russell and Company, acquired the remains of the operation and changed its name to Shewan, Tomes & Co., of which Tomes became Tai-pan, in 1895.

In 1901, Shewan, Tomes & Co. contributed to the foundation of helped the China Light and Power Company, and a new steamship company between the U.S. and China, Japan, and the Philippines known as the Pan-American Steamship Company.

== Personal life ==
On March 20, 1890, married Harriot Constance Budd Hancock, at St. John's Cathedral in Hong Kong. She was the daughter of Alfred Hancock of Scotland and Harriot Elizabeth Rider, née Budd. The couple lived at "Gough Hill" on Victoria Peak in Hong Kong, and in New York City, at 993 Park Avenue, which was built by Bing & Bing. They were the parents of five children, including:

- Alexander Hadden Tomes Sr. (b. 1891), who married Elizabeth St John Whiting, the daughter of William Sawin Whiting of Boston, in 1921.
- Gertrude Margaret Tomes (b. 1893), who married Major R. D. Crawford of the British Royal Artillery, in 1916.
- Francis H. Tomes, who married Lelia Baldwin, the eldest daughter of W. Barton Baldwin in 1931.
- Hetty E. Tomes.
- Joan Elspeth Tomes (1901–1980), who married Arthur Baldwin, 3rd Earl Baldwin of Bewdley, the son of Stanley Baldwin, 1st Earl Baldwin of Bewdley, who was Prime Minister of the United Kingdom, in 1936.

Tomes was a member of the Harvard Club and the University Club.

Tomes died on July 28, 1933, in Lossiemouth, Scotland. After his death, several of his items were acquired by the Peabody Museum in Salem, Massachusetts.

Tomes was a grandfather of Edward Baldwin, 4th Earl Baldwin of Bewdley (1938–2021), who was one of the ninety elected hereditary peers who remained after the passing of the House of Lords Act 1999.
