= Gheorghe Munteanu-Murgoci =

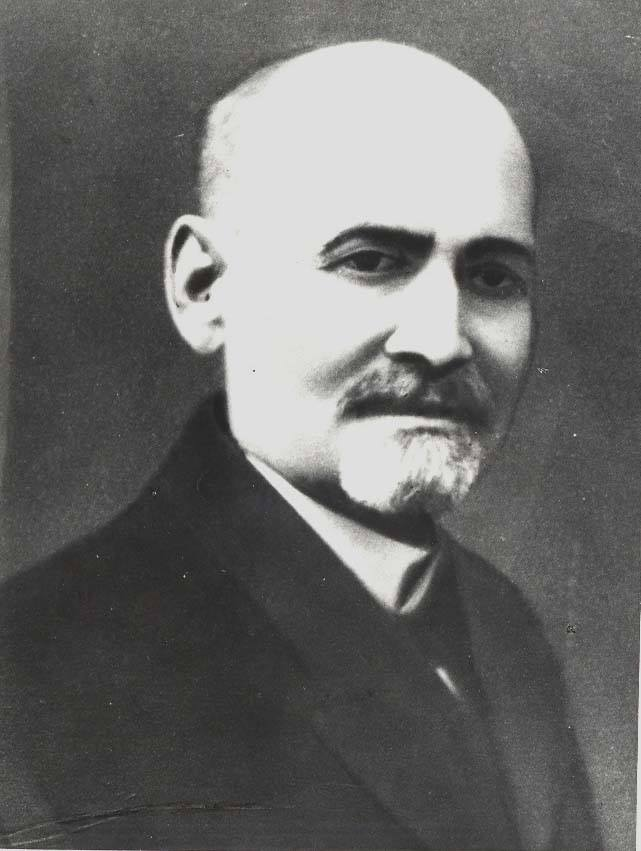
Gheorghe Munteanu-Murgoci

Gheorghe Munteanu Murgoci (July 20, 1872 – March 5, 1925) was a Romanian geologist, founder of the South-Eastern European Studies Institute in Bucharest. In 1923, he was elected a corresponding member of the Romanian Academy.

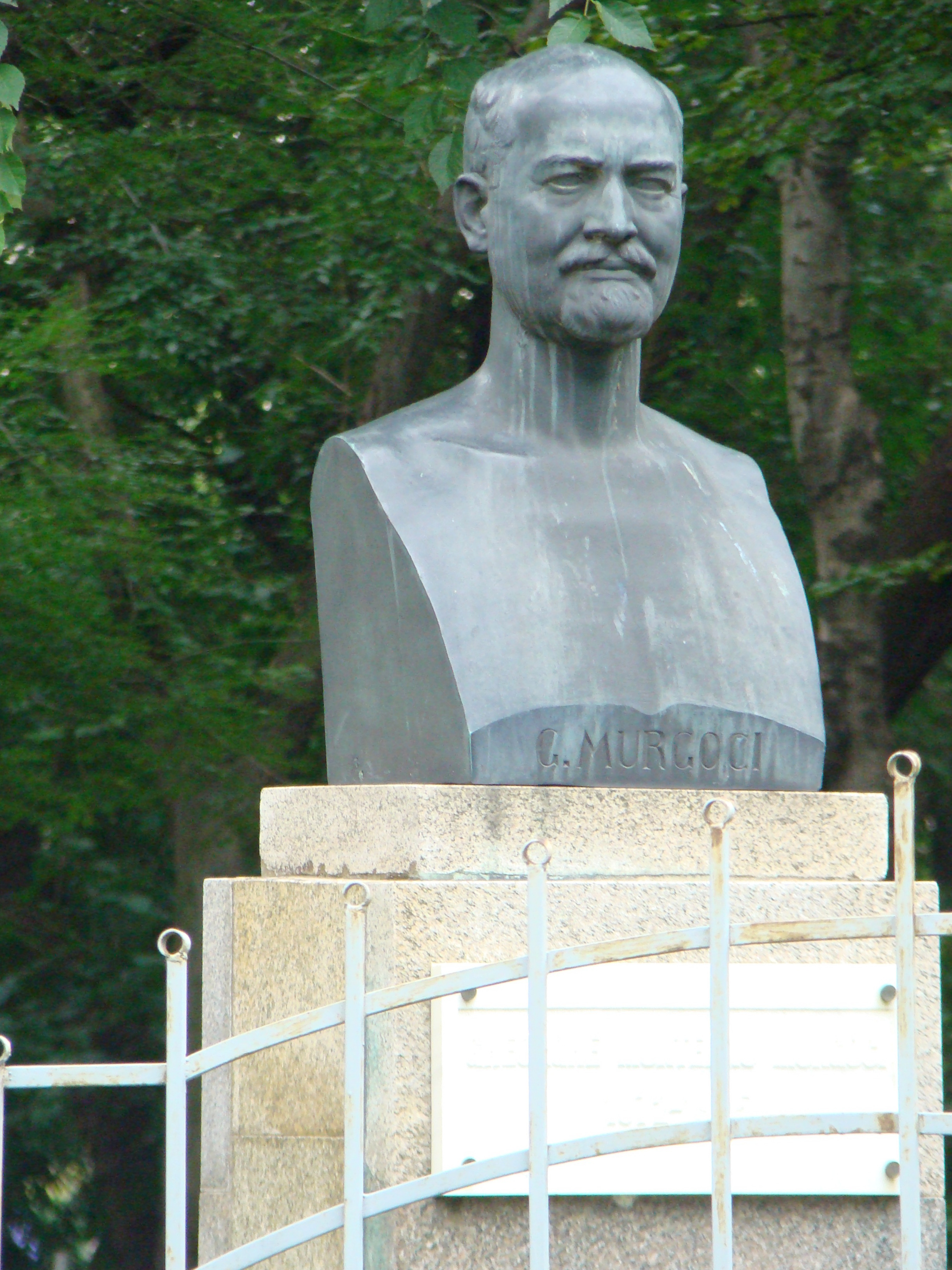
Bust of Munteanu Murgoci in Bucharest

Munteanu Murgoci was a native of Măcin, Tulcea County. He studied at the Saint Sava High School and then at the University of Bucharest. As part of a group of professors, physicians, soldiers, and others, he helped bring Scouting to Romania.

He married the British zoologist and folklorist Agnes Murgoci in 1904, together they had two children.

A high school in Brăila is named "Colegiul Național Gheorghe Munteanu Murgoci" in his honor.

== Bibliography ==
- Ioana Frunte-Lată, Oameni de știință tulceni – Mic dicționar biobibliografic, Tulcea, 2015, p 94–101
