= John Torrance =

Scottish-Canadian merchant and entrepreneur (1786 – 1870)

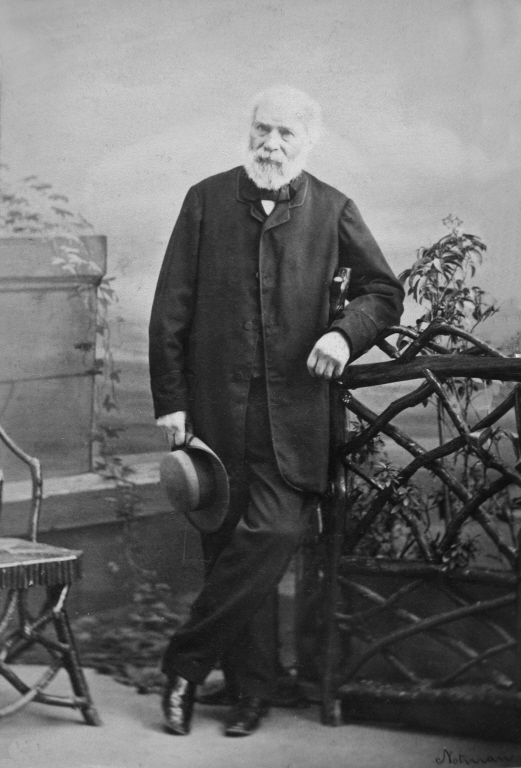
- Born: 8 June 1786; Larkhall, Lanarkshire
- Died: 20 January 1870 (aged 83); Montreal, Quebec, Canada
- Resting place: Mount Royal Cemetery
- Spouse: Elizabeth Fisher (m. 1811; death 1862)
- Children: 15
- Relatives: David Torrance (nephew)

John Torrance (June 8, 1786 – January 20, 1870) was a merchant and entrepreneur of Montreal, Lower Canada. He entered the railroad industry in the 1830s and ran steamboats on the St. Lawrence River. He was also a director of the Bank of Montreal and closely involved with many aspects to do with the progression of Montreal from the 1820s to the 1850s. His home, St. Antoine Hall, was one of the early estates of the Golden Square Mile.

== Early years ==
In 1786, John Torrance was born at Larkhall, Lanarkshire, Scotland. John was the second of the five very able sons born to Thomas Torrance (1735–1805), of Larkhall.

== Career ==
In 1805, John accompanied his four brothers to New York City, in 1897, he moved again to Montreal to join his brother, Thomas, who had established himself as a merchant there. John next went to Quebec City to represent Thomas' firm, meeting his wife there.

By 1814, he was back in Montreal and had opened a general store near to Thomas' on Saint-Paul Street. By 1826, his nephew David Torrance, had become a clerk in John's business, marrying John's daughter in 1832. Their business partnership lasted until John retired in 1853. This closeness between uncle and nephew was a likely reason for John's son opening his own rival firm.

The firm of John Torrance & Co., became strongly associated with tea. In the late 1820s, they began to import tea directly from China and India, breaking the East India Company monopoly previously controlled by Forsyth, Richardson & Co. They diversified into loans from their warehouses to Upper Canadian merchants and developed the Montreal & Quebec Steamboat Company, which at first competed with and then joined forces with John Molson. The Torrances were a major driving force with the Molsons in the creation of the St Lawrence Steamboat Services.

From as early as 1832 the Torrances jointly incorporated the Champlain and St Lawrence Railroad. By 1847, they had invested £1,000 to link Montreal by rail to the other major eastern port, Portland, Maine. John was a director of this railroad from 1847 until it became part of the Grand Trunk Railway in 1853. A complex web of railroads were being built to connect Montreal to New York City, and in 1846, Torrance was in the group that incorporated the Montreal and Lachine Railroad Company, of which he was later a director and inventor. This railroad later joined the Montreal and New York Railroad Company in 1850, and he was made a director. He was also a director of the St Lawrence and Ottawa Grand Junction Railroad Company, chartered in 1850, to extend the Montreal and Lachine line to Prescott, Canada West.

John Torrance was a stockholder in the short-lived Bank of Canada in Montreal and became a director of the Bank of Montreal from 1826 to 1857, after the death of his brother, Thomas. In the 1840s, he was a director of the Montreal Provident and Savings Bank and at one time had £2,000 invested in the City Bank of New York. In the 1850s, he was elected a director of the Montreal Fire, Life & Inland Navigation Assurance Company and of the Equitable Fire Insurance Company of London, England. He had been a founder of the Committee of Trade in 1822 and invested in a variety of land speculations and mortgages.

=== Civil life in Montreal ===
Torrance strongly supported the Montreal Annexation Manifesto, which cost him his commission as a Major in the militia. Through his wife's influence, he became a Methodist in later life and strongly supported his church as well as a variety of literary and educational associations. He was a life governor of the Montreal General Hospital and a founder and trustee of the Mount Royal Cemetery. He made gifts to McGill University including a fund for a gold medal in law as a memorial to his wife.

=== St. Antoine Hall ===
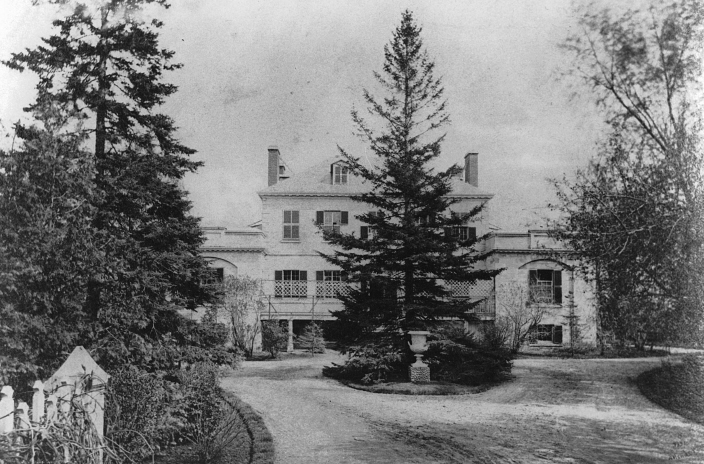
Rear view of Torrance's home, St. Antoine Hall, built in 1818

In 1818, Torrance built a 42-room mansion, St. Antoine Hall, off the then fashionable Saint Antoine Street. The house was renowned for its acres of gardens, conservatories, vineries, and orchards, enjoyed by Torrance whose hobby was gardening - he was also an incorporator of the Horticultural Society of Montreal in 1849. St. Antoine Hall was also famous for its high brick walls and the great gate which according to family tradition closed firmly at 10 p.m. Torrance's granddaughter, Evelyn (Galt) Springett (a god-daughter of Sir George-Étienne Cartier) remembered it as "a lovely place... great shady trees, and in summer the horse chestnuts were alive with humming birds". Torrance had also purchased a small estate in his native Scotland, known as the 'Gatehouse'.

== Personal life ==
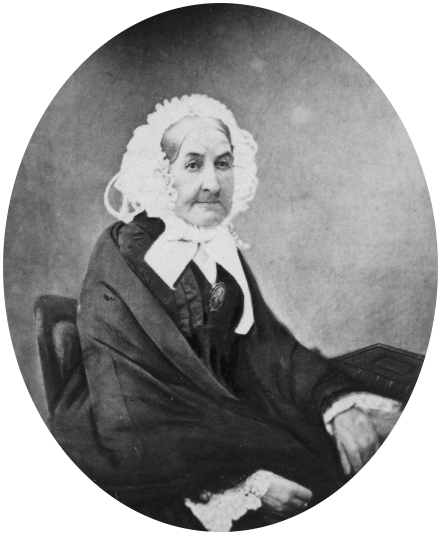
Mrs Elizabeth (Fisher) Torrance

In 1811, at Montreal, Torrance had married Elizabeth Fisher (1794–1862), the daughter of Catherine (née Embury) Fisher and Duncan Fisher, an American merchant who settled in Montreal after the Revolution. Elizabeth's maternal grandfather, Philip Embury, was the founder of Methodism in the United States. In their marriage contract, Torrance made a provision of £1,000 to her should she outlive him, an indication of his early success as he was only 25 at the time. Together, the Torrances were the parents of fifteen children, including:

- Jane Torrance (1812–1875), who married her first cousin and the business partner of her father, David Torrance, president of the Bank of Montreal.
- Daniel Torrance (1815–1885), who married Sophia Johnson Vanderbilt (1825–1912), daughter of Commodore Cornelius Vanderbilt.
- Elliot Torrance (1828–1850), who married Sir Alexander Tilloch Galt, the first Canadian Minister of Finance.
- Mary Eakin Torrance (1831–1907).
- Amy Gordon Torrance (1834–1911), who married her elder sister Elliot's widower after her death in 1850.
- Alexander Hutchison Torrance (1837–1880).

Torrance died on January 20, 1870, in Montreal. Upon his death, the Montreal Gazette called him, "one of our wealthiest citizens." His fortune was divided among his many children and his businesses were continued by his nephew, David.

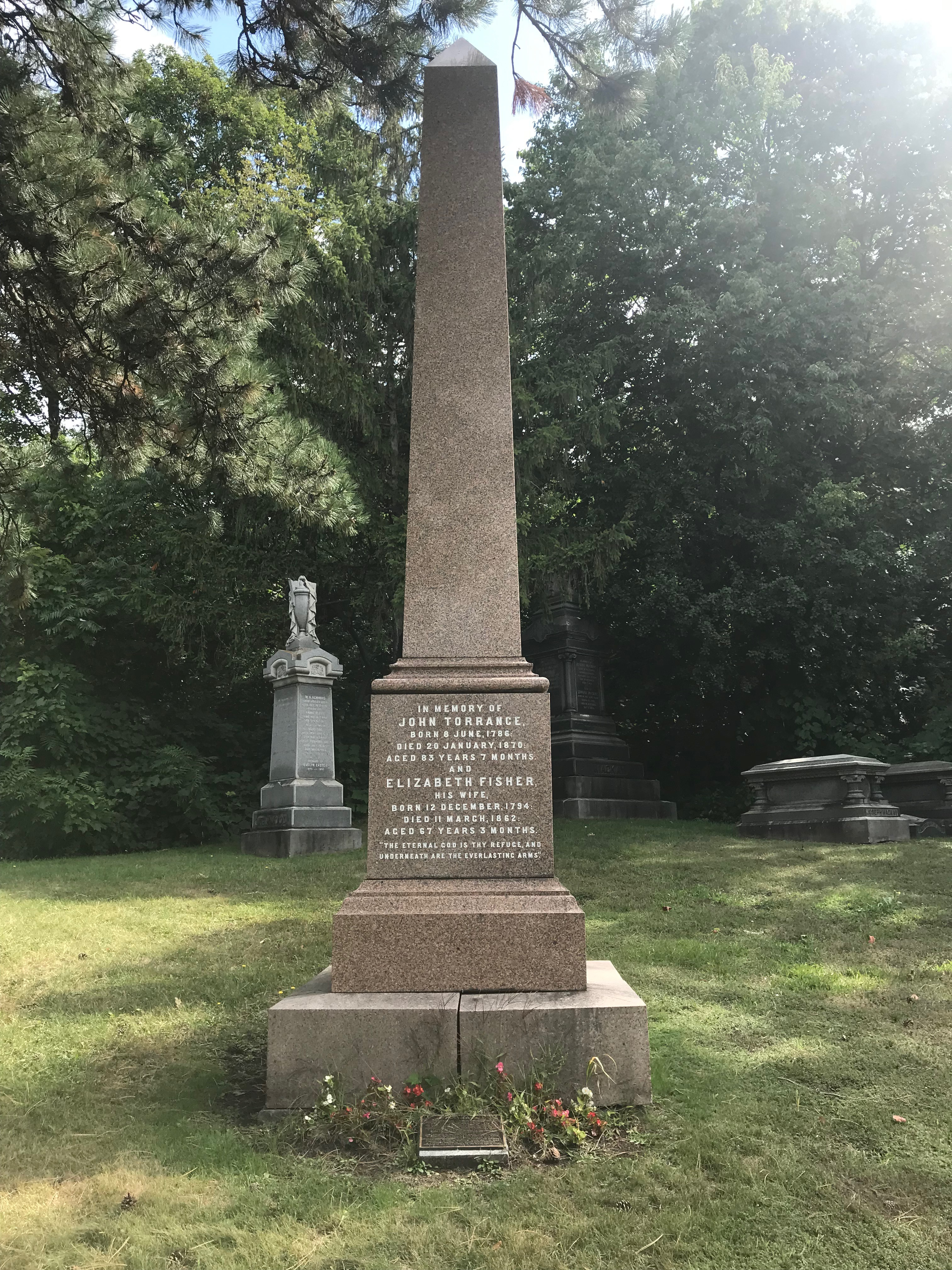
Torrance's funeral monument in Mount Royal Cemetery.

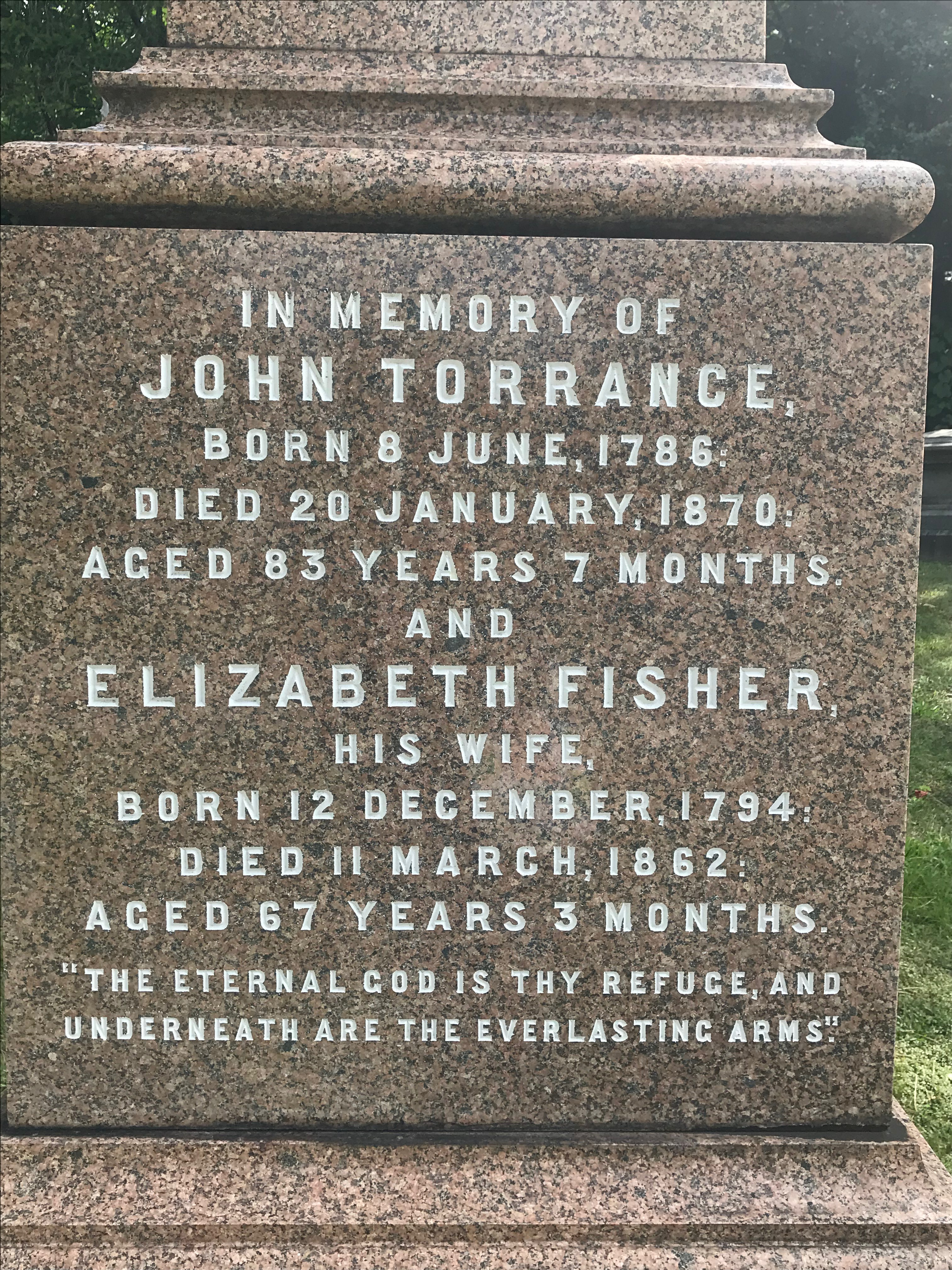
Detail of monument.

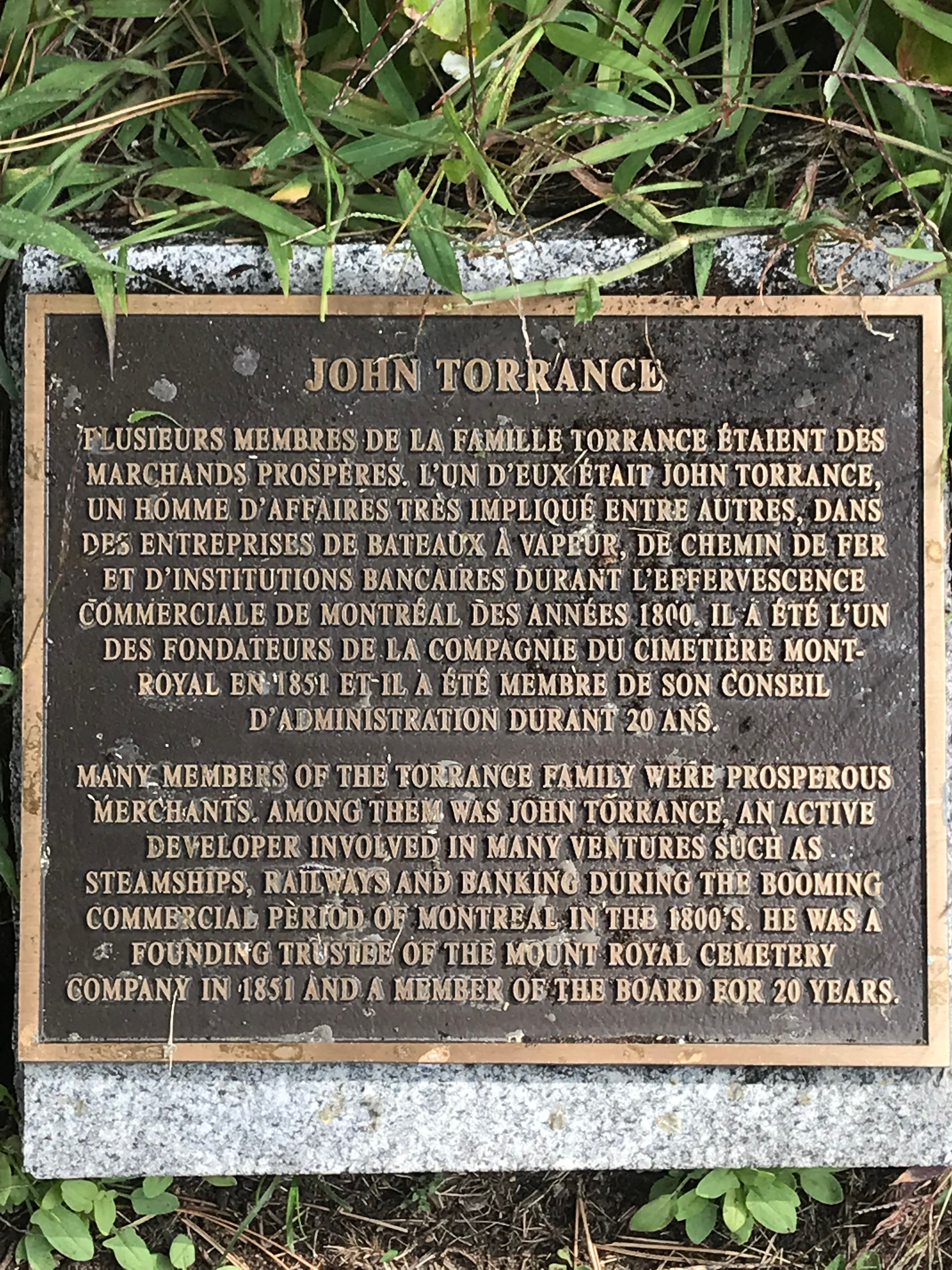
Plaque near the funeral monument.

=== Descendants ===
Through his son Daniel, he was the grandfather of Adelaide Torrance (1846–1932), who married Meredith Howland, Alfred Torrance (1852-1887), who married Louise Holmes Anthony, (Note: Louise Holmes Anthony later divorced Alfred Torrance in 1877 and married Alfred's cousin, Frederick William Vanderbilt in 1878.) and Marie Torrance (1858–1923), who married John A. Hadden Jr.
