= Maria Gordon =

Scottish geologist, paleontologist, and politician (1864–1939)

Dame May Ogilvie Gordon DBE
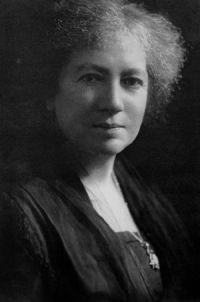
- Gordon in 1900
- Born: Maria Matilda Ogilvie; 30 April 1864; Monymusk, Aberdeenshire, Scotland
- Died: 24 June 1939 (aged 75); Regent's Park, London, England
- Resting place: Allenvale Cemetery, Aberdeen, Scotland
- Education: Heriot Watt College, University College, London, Ludwig-Maximilians-Universität München (LMU)
- Known for: Studying the Dolomites and creating the theory of crust-torsion
- Spouse: Dr John Gordon (m. 1895–1919)
- Children: 3
- Awards: Lyell Medal (1932); DBE (1935); Honorary LLD from University of Edinburgh (1935)
- Scientific career
- Fields: Geology
- Thesis: Ueber die obere Cassianer Zone an der Falzarego-Strasse (Südtirol) (1900)

Dame Maria Matilda Gordon DBE (née Ogilvie; 30 April 1864 – 24 June 1939), sometimes known as May Ogilvie Gordon or May Gordon, was an eminent Scottish geologist, palaeontologist, and politician. She was the first woman to be awarded a Doctor of Science degree from the University of London and the first woman to be awarded a PhD degree from the Ludwig-Maximilians-Universität München. She was also a supporter and campaigner for the rights and equality of children and women.

== Early life and education ==
Ogilvie was born in Monymusk, Aberdeenshire in April 1864, the eldest daughter of eight children (five brothers and two sisters, one of whom passed away in infanthood). With her parents being Maria Matilda Nichol and the Reverend Alexander Ogilvie LL.D., her family was very well educated. They had good connections and friends in various schools and colleges due to her father becoming the headmaster of Robert Gordons College after teaching for eight years at the local school. Thus, she and her siblings all experienced a profound education. Her eldest brother, Francis Grant Ogilvie, was also a scientist and director of the London Science Museum. In their younger years, Maria and Francis spent time climbing and hiking at their summer cabin in Deeside and in the Highlands. From the experiences she had with her older brother, Gordon gained remarkable talents for observation with quick intuitive understandings and an inexhaustible enthusiasm for fieldwork. This is where their love for geology began.

At the age of nine, she was sent away by her parents to a boarding school, the Merchant Company Edinburgh Ladies' College. She attended this school until she was eighteen and in those eight years, she became both head girl and the best academic pupil. Maria's original dream prior to science was to become a professional pianist. She continued her music career by attending the Royal Academy of Music in London. Even though she was good enough to perform with the academy orchestra, she decided to leave and began to enhance her scientific knowledge by getting a Bachelor of Science at Heriot-Watt College. Once completing her degree, she specialized in geology, botany and zoology, at University College London in 1890.

In 1891, she travelled to Germany to continue her studies at Berlin University. She was refused admission as women were not admitted to higher education institutions at the time in Germany, this despite the efforts of several influential friends and colleagues, including geologist Baron Ferdinand von Richthofen. After being denied, she accompanied von Richthofen and his wife to Munich where she studied with Karl von Zittel and Richard von Hertwig and carried out research. In July 1891, the Richthofens travelled to the Dolomites for five weeks, inviting Ogilvie to go with them. When arriving in the Dolomites, Gordon was impressed by the landscape, and she was introduced to Alpine geology. At the time when she and the Richthofen's visited the nearby meadows of Stuores, Maria focused her studies on modern corals and planned to study zoology rather than geology. However, after observing the preserved fossil corals found in Stuores, Richthofen pushed her to focus on geology and map and study what she would find in this area near the Dolomites. For two summers, Gordon, even through dangerous at times, climbed, hiked and studied multiple areas in the Dolomites which included suggestions from Richthofen such as the St. Cassian, Cortina d’Ampezzo and Schluderbach districts. Gordon began to teach local collectors of the area to be more careful when describing, collecting and recording the fossils they had found. From this, she began to expect full and definitive answers to geological questions being asked and was unwilling to postpone interpretations for the future.

After many scientific expeditions, Maria returned home, where she then fell in love and married John Gordon in 1895. He was also in the scientific field, working as a physician. Unlike many husbands during this period, John encouraged her to continue with her aspirations of geology and wanted to be a part of her journey. The couple and their four children would continue to travel into the Dolomites to help Maria further her studies. Her love of geology transferred to the lives of their children as they named one of their daughters Coral.

== Research ==
All of Maria Gordon's geological research was carried out in the South Tyrol. This area of the Alps is part of the geologically-complex Dolomites. These are a very distinct range of mountains, characterized by high, dramatic peaks, which were thought to have been formed from the remains of coral atolls in an ancient sea. Gordon challenged this idea with her theory of 'crust-torsion', the notion that the mountains had been formed by the pushing, twisting, and folding of the Earth's crust. Through observation and measurement of the geological structures in the Dolomites, she was able to determine that there were two phases of folding and structural deformation, leading to a new interpretation of the tectonic structure of the Alps.

In total, she wrote more than 30 papers based on her research and findings in this region, some of which are considered seminal works. Her biographer described her as "probably the most productive woman field geologist of any country in the late 19th and early 20th centuries." Throughout Maria’s many years of research, she was able to produce a 78-page article in February 1893 for the Geological Society’s Quarterly Journal. It was illustrated with many drawings and entitled Contributions to the geology of the Wengen and St. Cassian Strata in southern Tyrol. Being a single woman in this area she attracted attention, but she was ambitious and determined, as is shown in her perseverance to forward knowledge, even when she received no acknowledgement or recognition. This is something she highlighted in her reply to the President of the Geological Society years later, when she received her Lyell Medal (Ogilvie Gordon 1932), and once she had set her mind on something; nothing and nobody could distract her. The fact that she carried on her research in later years as a married woman showed her determination. Through the years she was very successful with her work, taking only a year to discover sites that allowed her to draw conclusions on development about corals, sponges, and other marine life which took place 230 million years ago. In 1893, she was awarded the Doctor of Science in Geology from the University of London, becoming the first woman to receive this degree. In 1900, she and Agnes Kelly became the first women to be awarded a PhD from the Ludwig-Maximilians-Universität München, receiving a distinction in the fields of geology, paleontology, and zoology. In October of the same year, Gordon published her new theory on 'crust-torsion' in the Royal Geographical Society entitled The origin of land-forms through crust-torsion, that then challenged the way people saw how the Dolomites were formed, and eventually this theory was accepted by the scientific community.

By the year 1913, Maria Gordon had written many geological surveys, analyses, and sample collections about the Dolomites, until she finally had enough to publish a general explanation and study of the geomorphological processes that had led to their mountainous creation. Maria had written hundreds of pages worth of research that she intended to have translated and published in German, and this research also included a very detailed geological map that she had coloured by hand. With this significant amount of work done, she sent all of her work to the head of the Paleontological Institute of the Ludwig-Maximilians-Universität München at the time, August Rothpletz. Rothpletz had previously looked down on her work and capabilities because of the fact she was a woman, but eventually confirmed much of her research and became a very close friend of hers. Once he had Maria’s collected work, she sent it on to a student who could successfully translate it from English to German. Progress was going along well, and the first few of Gordon’s maps had been drawn on lithographic stone and were set to begin the printing process when World War I began in 1914. Due to the social and political conflicts between Germany and England at the time, the progress on Maria’s research stopped, and as she busied herself with helping the war efforts in Britain there was no time for more geological work. To add to Maria’s disappointment over her still in-progress publication, in 1918 August Rothpletz died. This meant that after the war there was no trace of her manuscript or the name of the student who was in the midst of translating it. This devastated Maria as not only did she lose her colleague and friend, but she had also lost years' worth of research and hard work.

However, Maria was determined. In 1922, she returned back to the Dolomites to compare the now Italian landscape to the few remaining records and notes she had to attempt to reconstruct her research. Between herself and paleontologist Julius Pia, they continued to explore the Dolomites up until 1925. Finally, in 1927, Gordon was able to publish her major scientific work by the Geographical Survey of Austria institute, entitled The Gröden, Fassa and Enneberg areas in the South Tyrolean Dolomites and subtitled Geological Descriptions with emphasis on overthrust fault phenomena. After her major publication of the approximately 400-page treatise, in 1928, she wrote two geological guidebooks for tourists and amateurs about the Dolomites, with the goal of increasing tourism in the region. Therefore, Maria is seen as one of the first people to acknowledge the importance of geotourism with her geological conclusions becoming common knowledge. Regardless of her contributions, as a woman, Maria Gordon and her work were not recognized or appreciated until later in her career, and as many letters to her geologist colleague and friend Julius Pia state, she felt for a long time that her work didn’t count at all to other geologists.

== Politics ==
May Ogilvie Gordon

She was active in politics as a Liberal and an advocate of women's and children's rights. Gordon was a part of an article that discussed the environments of children in the early 1900s. She advocated that children, and especially young girls, should be in the classroom rather than in the workforce. Maria Gordon protested against the state, maintaining that students should not be removed from school so young, with still so much to learn. Fighting for the extension of schooling past the age of fourteen, Gordon believed that young girls had the potential to achieve more than just voluntary jobs such as homemakers. She also advocated for the same curriculum to be taught to all, instead of boys and girls having different lessons based on gender norms. On February 8, 1922 she was selected as prospective parliamentary candidate for David Lloyd George supporting National Liberals at the Canterbury constituency. A General Election was called for November 1922 but on November 3, she withdrew. Following Liberal re-union between Lloyd George and H. H. Asquith she contested the 1923 General Election as Liberal candidate for the Unionist seat of Hastings, pushing the Labour candidate into third place;

1923 General Election: Hastings Electorate 29,662
| Party | Candidate | Votes | % | ±% |
|---|---|---|---|---|
| Unionist | Lord Eustace Sutherland Campbell Percy | 11,914 | 52.6 | |
| Liberal | Mrs Maria Matilda Ogilvie Gordon | 5,876 | 25.9 | n/a |
| Labour | W. Richard Davies | 4,859 | 21.5 | |
| Majority | | 6,038 | 26.7 | |
| Turnout | | | 76.4 | |
| Unionist hold | | Swing | | |

As an advocate of women's rights, she served as Vice President of the International Council of Women, Honorary President of the Associated Women's Friendly Society and the National Women's Citizens Association, and also as President of the National Council of Women of Great Britain and Ireland. She played an important part in the post-World War I negotiations at the Council for the Representation of Women in the League of Nations.

== Honours and awards ==
Over the years, Maria Gordon earned numerous awards for her contributions to science specifically, geology. In 1890, Maria Gordon graduated from the University College of London with a gold medal in geology, zoology, and botany. In 1893, she was the first female to receive a Doctor of Science (DSc) in Geology from the University of London. Following her Doctorate, in 1900, Maria Gordon and Agnes Kelly became the first women to receive a PhD from the Ludwig-Maximilians-Universität München. They received distinctions in geology, paleontology, and zoology. In 1916, Maria was made President of the National Council of Women of Great Britain and Ireland.

In 1919, Gordon helped form the Council of Representation of Woman in the League of Nations. She played an active role in the World War one negotiations while a part of the council. Within the same year, Maria Gordon was among the first group of women to be elected to the Geological Society of London. In the following year, she was the first JP and Chairman of the Marylebone Court of Justice. In 1928, the University of Innsbruck awarded her a diploma of honorary membership. In this same year, the Geological Survey of Austria nominated her as an honorary correspondent.

Gordon became an honorary member of the Vienna Geological society and at the time she was the only female honorary member in 1931. In 1932, she was awarded the Lyell Medal from the Geological Society of London. In 1935, she was made a Dame Commander of the British Empire (DBE), to reflect her contributions to the welfare of women. A room in the Ludwig-Maximilians-Universität München's library is named in her honour as the Maria-Ogilvie-Gordon-Raum and it houses the map collection of the Department of Geology.

Gordon's work in Geology and Politics is still recognised today. In 2000, a new fossilized fern genus was found in the Triassic layer of the Dolomites and named after Maria Gordon and Carmela Loriga Broglio in honour of both of their work in the Dolomites, called Gordonopteris lorigae. In August 2021, a rover landed on Mars in their attempt to drill into the Gale Crater. Based on the images from the Curiosity rover, NASA's laboratory named a cliff on the western wall of their passageway to the crater after Gordon, calling it the "Maria Gordon Notch." NASA wanted to acknowledge the work she did in her time in the Dolomites along with her other impactful work regarding geology.

Non-profit organization positions
| Preceded by Lady Laura Ridding | President of the National Union of Women Workers; 1916–1920 | Succeeded by Maud Palmer, Countess of Selborne |
