= Green Island Cement =

Cement producer in Hong Kong

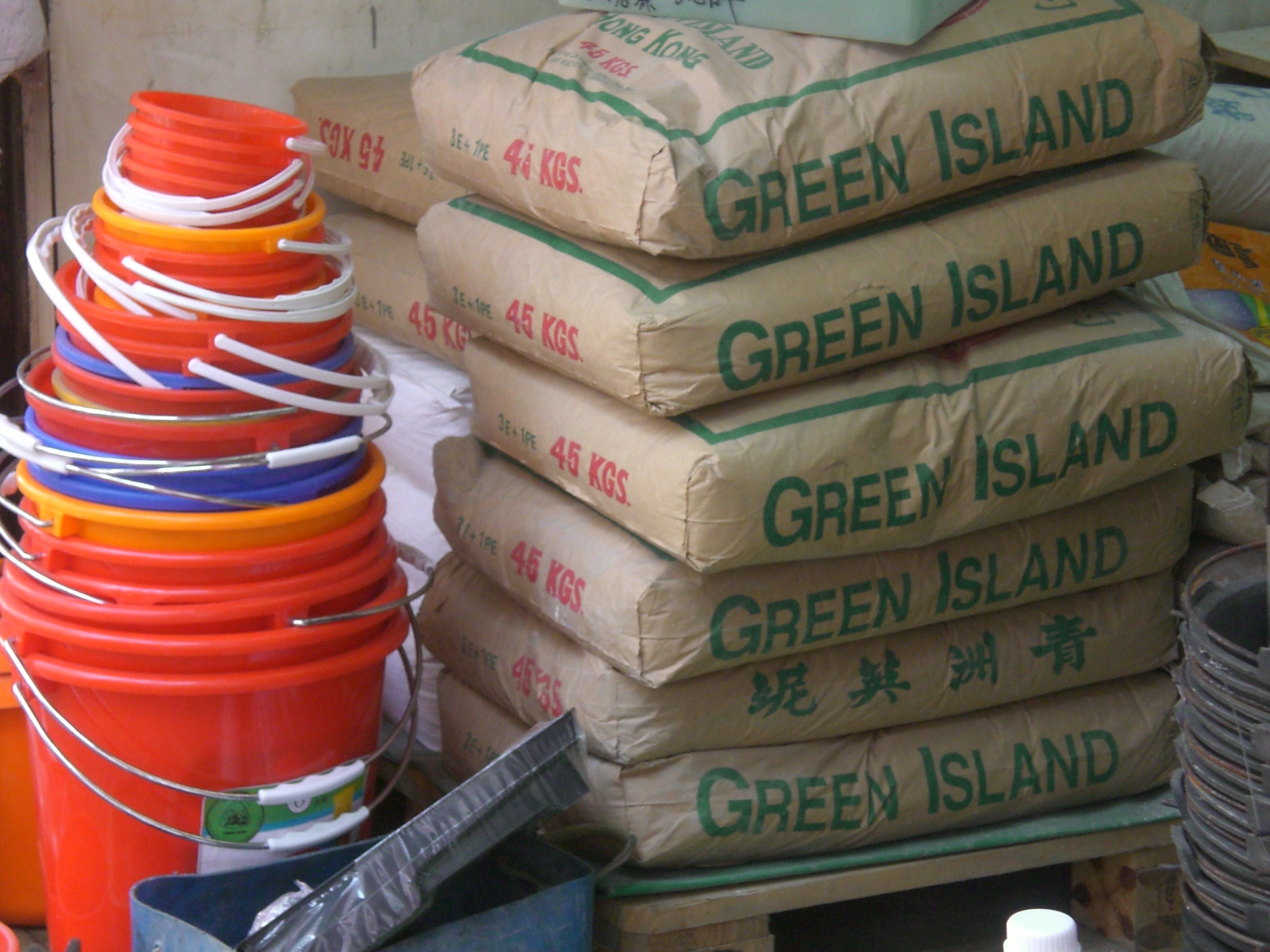
Green Island Cement.

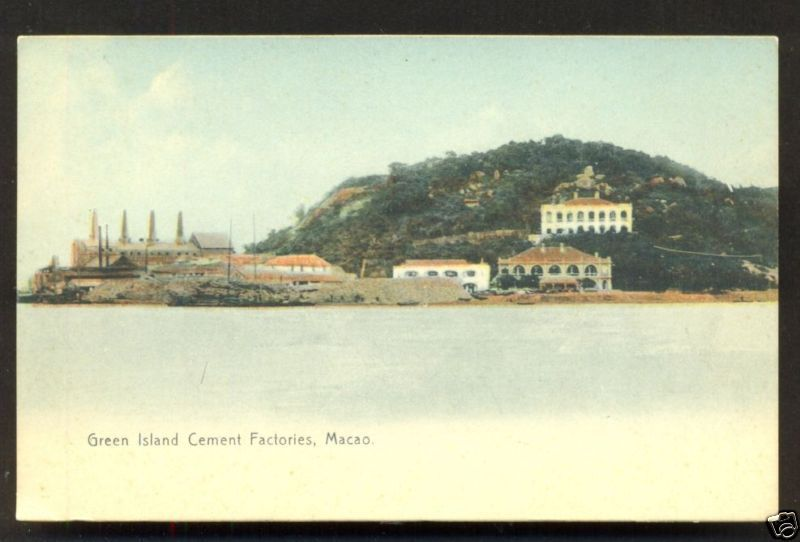
Green Island Cement Factory in Macau c1906.

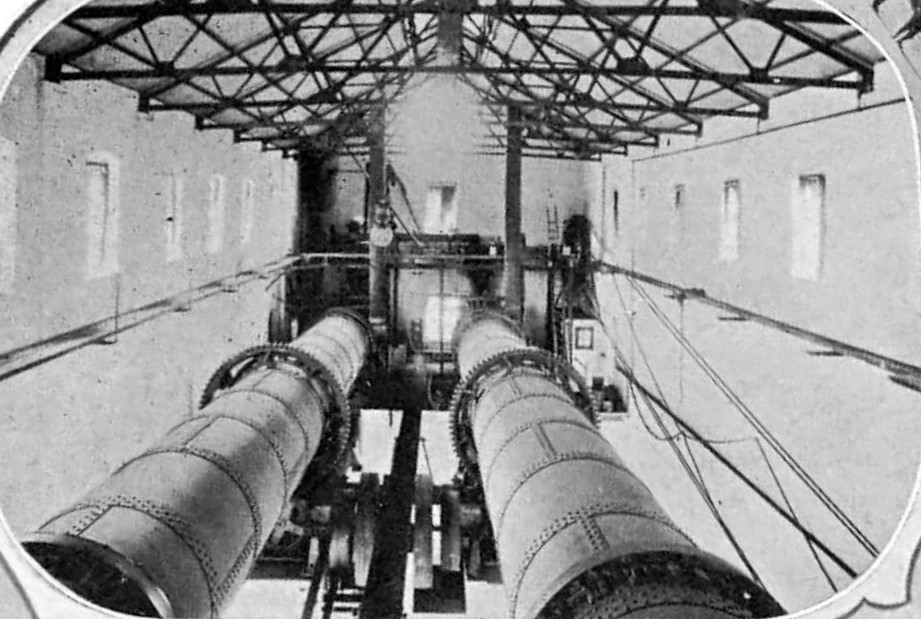
Cement kilns of Green Island Cement in Hong Kong c.1908.

Green Island Cement is Hong Kong's only major cement producer. It was a former listed company in Hong Kong and was delisted from the Hong Kong Stock Exchange. It was founded in Green Island, Macau in 1887, and has established operations in Hong Kong and South China. It operates 6 concrete plants in Hong Kong with a total of 11 production lines, and 3 quarries each in Hong Kong and mainland China . It is a wholly owned subsidiary of Cheung Kong Infrastructure Holdings.

== History ==
The company was founded in Ilha Verde (meaning "green island") in Macau in 1886 with British investment and was the first manufacturer of Portland cement in the region, with lime kilns that burned locally dredged coral and imported limestone. A second factory was established in Hung Hom in 1898, as Britain took control of the New Territories, under the Second Convention of Peking.

The availability of inexpensive cement was a boon to the development of the area that followed, and further provided a useful export capacity, such as of encaustic glazed floor tiles.

The firm relocated to Hok Un, Hong Kong in 1925 and became a British company shortly afterward. The company was a major employer for many decades.

In 1978, Li Ka-shing held a 25% stake in Green Island Cement. The following year, he increased his holding to 40% and became the chairman of Green Island Cement. Until October 1988, Cheung Kong Holdings announced a comprehensive acquisition at a price of 20 HKD per share to privatize Green Island Cement. At that time, Cheung Kong Holdings held 44.6% of the shares, and the purchase price was a 13% premium to the market price of 17.7 HKD, involving 1.123 billion HKD. By the end of the acquisition on December 30 of the same year, Cheung Kong Holdings had purchased 95% of the equity and completed the privatization and delisting through compulsory acquisition. After the transaction, Cheung Kong Holdings acquired a large piece of land owned by Green Island Cement at its factory in Hung Hom, Kowloon for future real estate development.

== Business ==
=== Cement Manufacturing ===
Green Island Cement has manufacturing plants in Hong Kong and Yunfu and Shantou in Guangdong, China, respectively . Green Island Cement's factory in Tap Shek Kok, Tuen Mun, is the only integrated cement product manufacturing plant in Hong Kong, accounting for about 1/3 of the Hong Kong market.

=== Mining in Southeast Asia ===
Limestone is mainly mined and exported in Siquijor Province, Philippines .

=== Ship transportation ===
It mainly provides ships to transport its own products.
