= Shewan, Tomes & Co. =

Trading company in Hong Kong and China

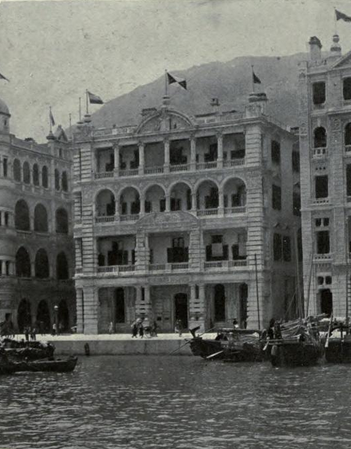
The St. George Building, which served as the principal office of the Shewan, Tomes & Co., c.1908. The flag of the company is shown hoisted

Shewan, Tomes & Co. was one of the leading trading companies in Hong Kong and China during the late 19th and early 20th century.

== History ==
When Russell & Co., which was then one of the largest mercantile companies in the Far East, was dissolved in 1891, its former employees Robert Shewan, a Scotsman, and Charles Alexander Tomes, an American, used the infrastructure of the defunct company to create Shewan, Tomes & Co. in 1895. The company established offices in Hong Kong, Canton, Shanghai, Tianjin, Kobe, London, and New York; and had agencies in Amoy, Fuzhou, Formosa, Hankou, Manila, and the Straits Settlements. Shewan, Tomes & Co.'s principal office was at the St. George's Building in Central, Hong Kong.

House flag of Shewan, Tomes & Co.

Through its base in Canton, the company's principal commodities of export were raw silk, tea, matting, fire-crackers, cassia, rhubarb, aniseed, ginseng, and rattan; and its principal commodities of import were cottons, woollens, glass, iron, steel, coal, and many other basic commodities.

The firm expanded to become the general manager of many prominent companies based in China. These included the China and Manila Steamship Company, the American-Asiatic Steamship Company, the Green Island Cement Company, the Hong Kong Rope Manufacturing Company, the China Provident Loan and Mortgage Company, the Equitable Life Assurance Society, the Canton Land Company. The company also served as an agent for steamers of the Shire Line, the Yangtsze Insurance Association, the Insurance Company of North America, the Batavia Sea and Fire Insurance Company, the North British and Mercantile Insurance Company, the Reliance Marine Insurance company, the Union Marine Insurance company, the World Marine Insurance company, the Law Union and Crown Insurance company, the Yorkshire Fire and Life Insurance company, the Fireman's Fund Insurance company, the Federal Insurance Companies, the Electric Traction Company of Hong Kong, the Chinese Engineering and Mining Company, the Shanghai Pulp and Paper Company, and the Tacoma Grain Company. In 1901, Shewan, Tomes & Co. contributed to the foundation of the China Light and Power Company, which remains one of the two electricity suppliers in Hong Kong.

Shewan, Tomes & Co. was acquired by Wheelock Marden & Co. in 1951.

== See also ==
- List of trading companies
