= James Howell (politician) =

American politician

James Howell Jr.
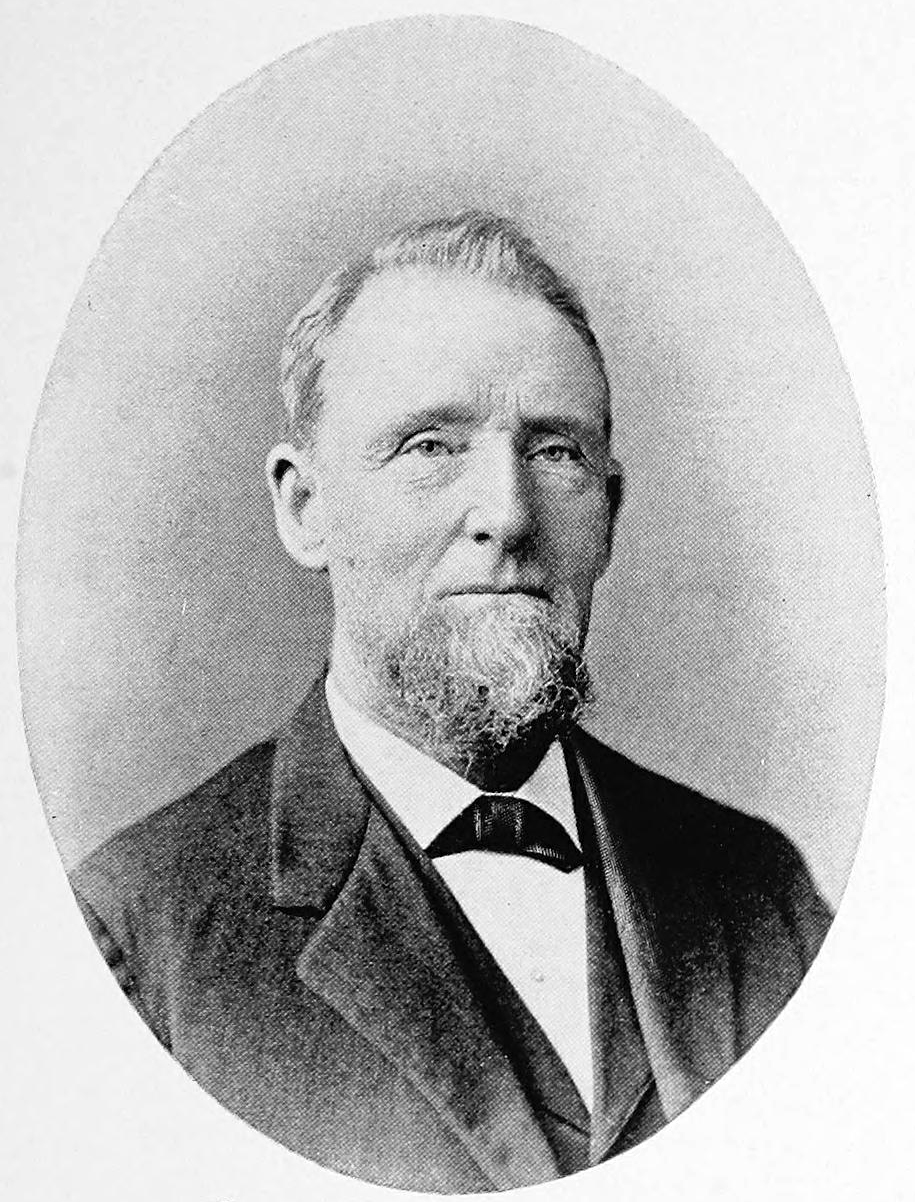

19th Mayor of Brooklyn
- In office 1878–1881
- Preceded by: Frederick A. Schroeder
- Succeeded by: Seth Low

Personal details
- Born: October 16, 1829 Bradford, Wiltshire, England
- Died: January 27, 1897 (aged 67) Brooklyn, New York, US
- Resting place: Green-Wood Cemetery
- Party: Democratic
- Spouse: Anna Tunstall
- Occupation: Howell & Saxtan Ironworks
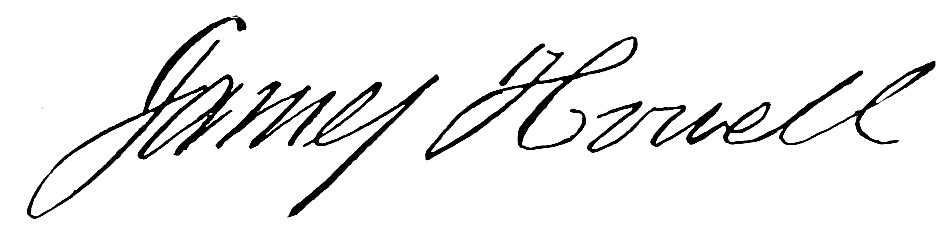
- Signature

James Howell Jr. (October 16, 1829 – January 27, 1897) was a partner in Howell & Saxtan Ironworks, and served two consecutive terms as 19th Mayor of Brooklyn, New York 1878–1881.

== Early life ==
Howell was born October 16, 1829, in Bradford, Wiltshire, England. At the age of six he moved with his parents to New Lisbon, Ohio. Howell moved to Brooklyn in 1845. He first tried a career as a grocer, but before long switched careers to become a foreman in an iron foundry. By 1855, he had started the firm of Howell & Saxtan.

== Howell & Saxtan ==
Howell & Saxtan were in business in Brooklyn, N. Y. from approximately 1866 until the early 1890s. The proprietors were James Howell (1829-1897) and Daniel Y. Saxtan (1824-1904). Their mark can be found on manhole covers and cast iron buildings in Brooklyn, especially around Fulton Avenue and Grand Street, and lower Manhattan. The address on the foundry mark is 353 Adams St, Brooklyn.

== Mayor of Brooklyn ==
Howell was elected mayor of Brooklyn for two terms. He was a Democrat in a highly Democratic-leaning town; Democrats had a majority of about 8 to 10 thousand voters by population.

Howell won his first election over Republican John F. Henry by 3,000 votes. He won re-election to his second term over Franklin Woodruff by 12,000 votes.

Brooklyn politics at this time were dominated by Democratic party boss Hugh McLaughlin. Graft and corruption were widespread practices of the day; although Howell was not personally involved in any scandal, he was widely considered a "mediocre" mayor.

The tax rate in Brooklyn fell during Howell's two terms, from $3.17 to $2.36, this despite rapid growth in Brooklyn, including the construction of the Brooklyn Bridge during those years. Brooklyn had seen a huge increase in population leading up to, and during, this time.

Howell lost his third term contest to Republican Seth Low, 45,434 votes to 40,937, a margin of less than 5,000 votes. An estimated 15,000 Democratic voters crossed party lines to vote for Low. Newspapers attributed the loss to a general upswing in the good government movement and a dissatisfaction with McLaughlin machine, not dissatisfaction with Howell personally.

== Post-Mayor career ==
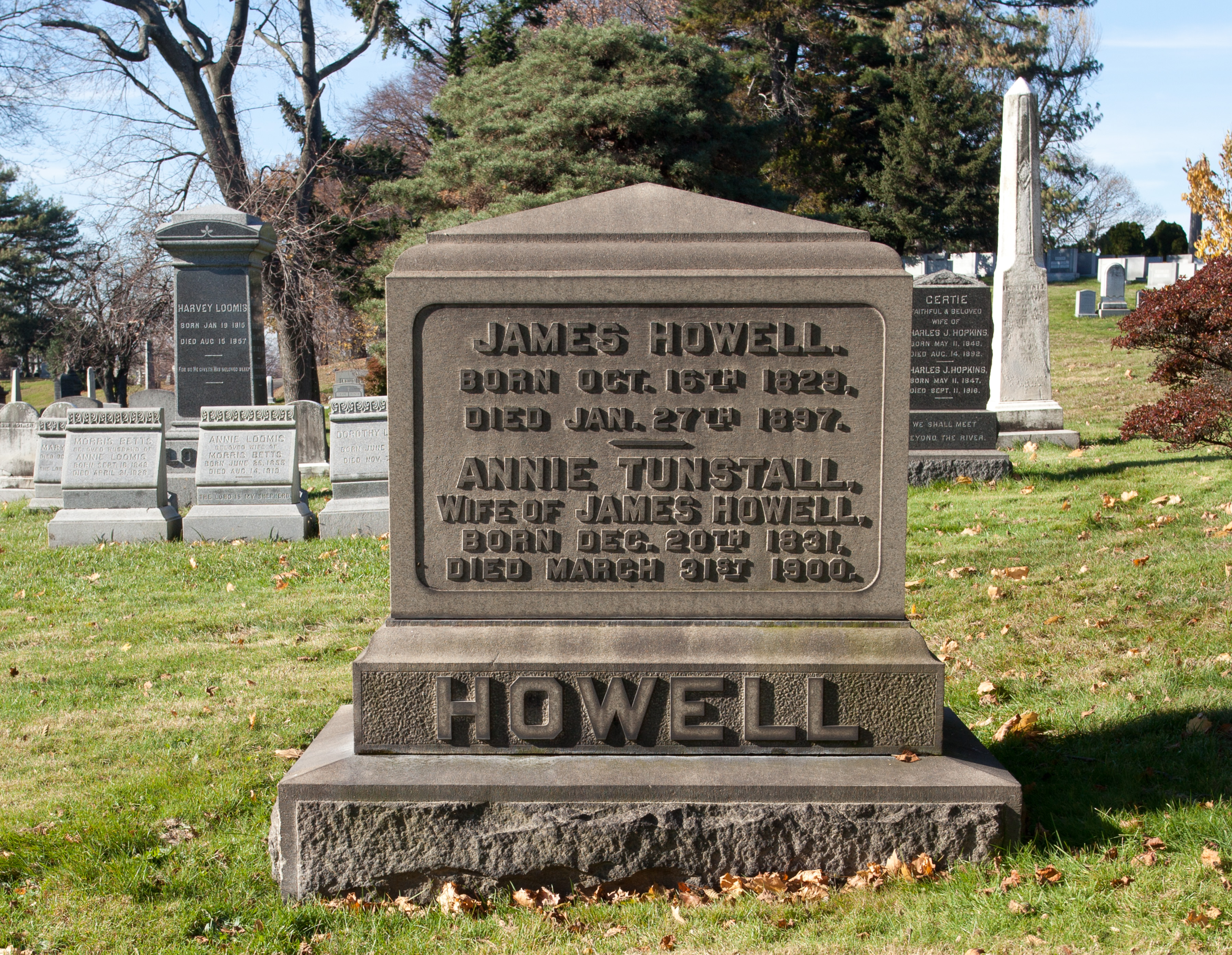
Howell's grave in Green-Wood Cemetery

Howell became a trustee of the Brooklyn Bridge in 1883, and in 1885 elected president of the trustees, an office which he held until his death. He was credited for "carrying out many great improvements" on the bridge.

== Personal life ==
Howell married Anna Tunstall in 1851. They had a son and two daughters. He was a member of the Hanson Place Central United Methodist Church for many years.

Howell died at his home on South Portland Avenue in Brooklyn on January 27, 1897. He had been ill since the previous Spring. He was buried in Green-Wood Cemetery.

Political offices
Preceded by Frederick A. Schroeder	Mayor of Brooklyn; 1878 – 1881	Succeeded by Seth Low
