= Harriet Low =

American writer (1809–1877)

Harriett Low Hillard
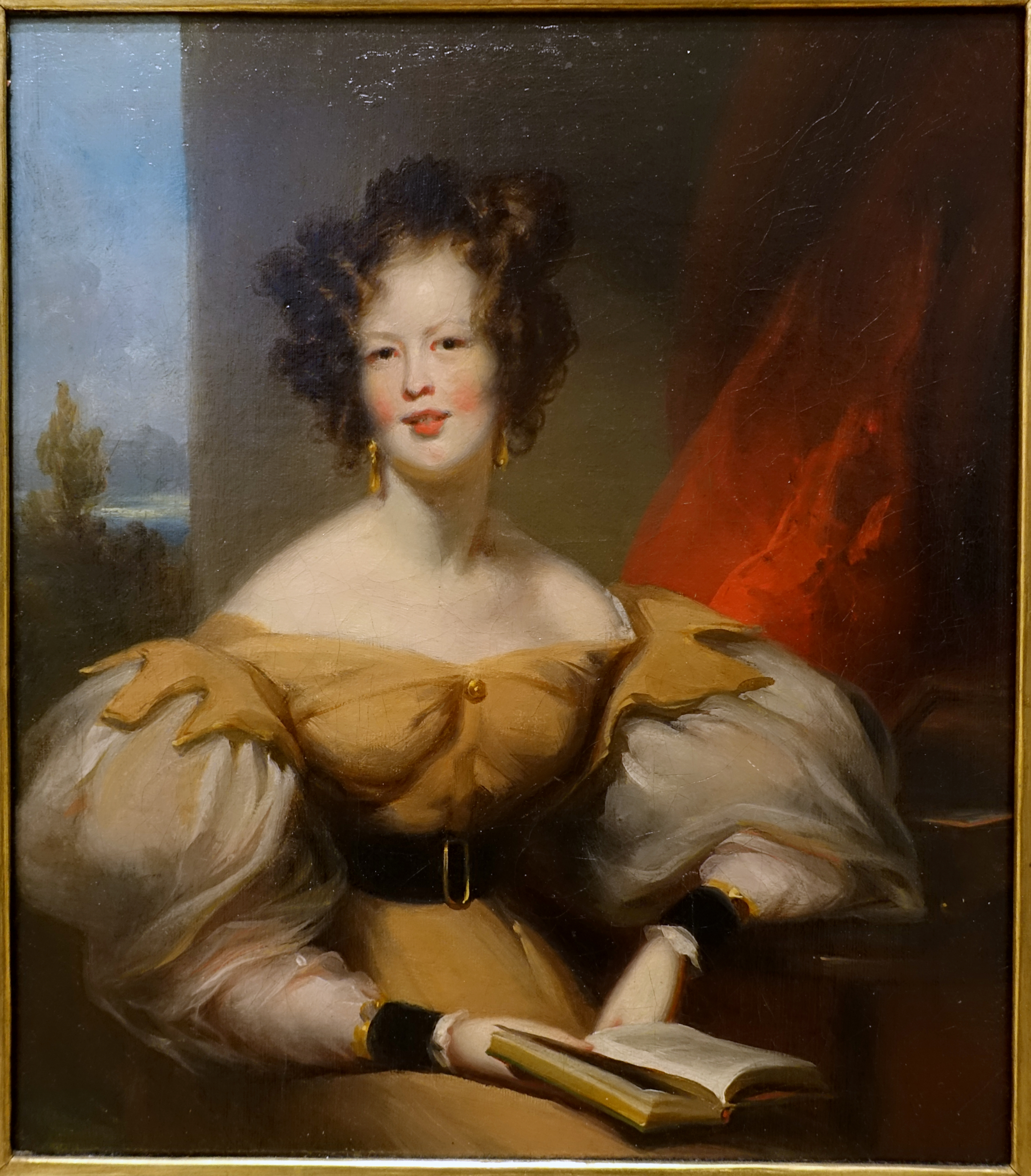
- Harriett Low, 1833 by George Chinnery
- Born: May 18, 1809; Salem, Massachusetts, US
- Died: 1877 (aged 67–68); Brooklyn, New York
- Known for: Macau journal, 1829–1833
- Spouse: John Hillard
- Children: Katharine; Mary Louise; Ellen; Harriet; 1 other daughter; 3 sons (2 were twins and died at a young age)
- Parents: Seth Low; Mary Porter Low
- Relatives: Abiel Abbot Low (brother); William Henry Low (uncle); Abbot Augustus Low (nephew); Seth Low (nephew)

Harriett Low Hillard (May 18, 1809 – 1877) was an American woman of letters and diarist. From 1829 to 1833 she lived in the Portuguese colony of Macau on the South China coast. She and her sickly aunt became the first American women to go to China. During her stay from 1829 to 1833, she wrote a journal in the form of letters to her older sister Molly (Mary Ann, 1808–1851), and became acquainted with many of the influential individuals in the colony. After her return to the United States, she married and moved to London, returning to New York with her husband and five daughters in 1848. Her journal became part of the Low-Mills collection in the Library of Congress.

== Biography ==
She was born Harriet Low, the second of twelve children of Seth and Mary Porter Low, in Salem, Massachusetts. Her father was a well-to-do merchant and owner of a successful shipping business among the ports of Salem, New York, London, and Canton (modern-day Guangzhou). A leading citizen of Brooklyn, Seth Low was one of the founders of the Unitarian church in that city. As one of four daughters in a large family, Harriet engaged in many household tasks, including sewing and mending.

In 1829 her uncle, American trader William Henry Low, and his wife Abigail Knapp Low (1795–1834), prepared to move to China for a five-year stay. While William Henry Low would be managing business interests for Russell & Co. in Canton, which was off-limits to women, his wife would be staying in Macau. They asked Harriet to accompany them and provide companionship for her aunt. The party boarded the Sumatra for a four-month voyage across the Atlantic and Indian Oceans, which included a three-week stopover in Manila. Harriet arrived in Macau on 29 September 1829, and took up residence at 2, Pátio da Sé, at the top of Calçada de S. João. She soon became acquainted with many of the well-known residents of Macau, including the painter George Chinnery, who painted her portrait; the Hong Merchant Howqua; and the surgeon Thomas Richardson Colledge. Through her uncle's connections, she also became familiar with all the employees of the East India Company along with other prosperous British merchants in the city. As the only unmarried young woman in the colony, she was invited to many "fancy balls, dances, teas and dinners".

Low had a strong desire to visit Canton, the only foreign trading enclave permitted in China at the time. However, under the regulations of the Thirteen Factory System, women were strictly forbidden from entering. Low and her aunt dressed up like boys, sailed to Canton, and went straight to the American Factory. When the Chinese discovered the women's true identities, they threatened to stop all trade in Canton forthwith, forcing Low and her aunt to leave.

During her stay in Macau, Low became secretly engaged to William Wightman Wood, a young naturalist from Philadelphia who was a founder and editor of the Canton Register, one of the first English language newspapers in China. When she informed her uncle of the engagement, he objected to her marrying a "penniless adventurer" and forced her to break off the arrangement.

In 1833, Low posed for a portrait by George Chinnery. She wore a low-cut dress in the latest fashion from Calcutta, with the sleeves stuffed with down pillows.

In 1833, Harriet departed China with the aunt and uncle to return to Salem. Her uncle, who was seriously ill, died on the way back to the United States.

In 1836, she married John Hillard (1813–1859), a son of English parents who was born in Richmond, Virginia. The couple settled in London, where John was a partner in a large bank. They had three sons and five daughters. Only the girls survived; Mary Hillard Loines was active in the women's suffrage movement.

In 1848, Hillard's bank failed and the family returned to the United States, moving in with Harriet's father in Brooklyn, New York. Hillard became "unstable and sick" and was unable to work. After his death in 1859, Harriet was supported by her family until her death in 1877.

Seth Low, a president of Columbia University, and mayor of Brooklyn and of New York, was her nephew, the son of her brother Abiel Abbot Low.

== Journal ==
Sunday, May 24, 1829: Embarked on board the Sumatra bound to Manila, and thence to Macao, where I shall probably take up my residence for the next four years; and for you, my dear sister, shall this journal be kept. I left home at five o'clock (in the morning) with feelings not to be described or imagined but by those who have been placed in a similar situation.

— Harriet Low's journal

Harriet described the multicultural experiences of life in the city under Portuguese administration and the social life of its Anglo-American residents in a journal in the form of letters to her older sister, Mary Ann. She described the many opportunities for socializing at dinners, parties, and balls, and entertainment in the form of musical evenings, card games, amateur theatre, and operas. The women passed the rest of their time reading, writing letters, sewing, learning languages (Harriet learned Spanish), going out on walks, horse riding, and gossiping. As a Unitarian, Harriet was uncomfortable with the dominance of the Catholic religion in Macau.

Her journal entries from 1829 to 1834 filled nine volumes, a total of 947 pages. In 1900 her daughter Katharine printed an abridged version of the diary under the title My Mother's Journal: A young lady's diary of five years spent in Manila, Macao, and the Cape of Good Hope from 1829-1834. A re-edited version, including letters that Harriet wrote to her family, was printed by her granddaughter, Elma Loines, in The China Trade Post-Bag in 1953. The journal was printed in its entirety in Lights and Shadows of a Macao Life: The journal of Harriett Low, travelling spinster, Part I (2002), edited by Nan P. Hodges. As a first-person account, the journal is regarded as an important historical document for researchers of the China trade.

== Legacy ==
A bronze drinking fountain dedicated in memory of Harriet Low Hillard, commissioned by her granddaughter Elma Loines in 1910, stands in the Brooklyn Botanic Garden.
