= William Wightman Wood =

William Wightman Wood (Chinese: 伍德; pinyin: Wǔdé ?1804 – ?) was an American journalist, businessman, naturalist and poet based in Macau and Canton, China.

== Biography ==
He was the son of celebrated actors William B. Wood and Juliana Westray Wood.

In 1827, Wood was a founder and editor of one of the first English-language newspapers in China, The Canton Register, which he printed himself on a hand press donated by James and Alexander Matheson, partners in the trading house Jardine, Matheson & Co. Starting with the second issue of The Canton Register, Wood began to criticise the censorial policies of the East India Company as well as the "despotic and corrupt manner" in which the Chinese operated the Canton System of trade. He also expressed strong opposition to the idea that Westerners in China should be subject to the "impositions" of the Chinese authorities. The powerful East India Company and the resident British community saw such comments as an attack on British trade policy and forced Wood to resign after editing the sixth issue of the newspaper.

After a spell in Philadelphia, Wood returned to Canton in February 1831 aboard the American ship Fanny where he joined the trading company Russell & Co. as secretary to William Henry Low, one of the partners. However, Wood lacked business acumen and never achieved monetary success. After leaving Russell & Co, the first edition of Wood's own publication, The Chinese Courier and Canton Gazette came off the presses on July 28, 1831. The title was later shortened to The Chinese Courier in 1832 but the paper succumbed to competition from other periodicals and ceased publication on September 23, 1833 A clever poet, Wood composed parodies of well known poems based on life in Canton, including one by Lord Byron. He was also a skilled draughtsman and caricaturist who offered art lessons to the foreign community and wrote and illustrated his own book, Sketches of China, published in 1830.

Wood fell in love with the diarist Harriet Low and frequently visited her home in Macao, ostensibly to give her drawing lessons. When he secretly asked for her hand in marriage, she accepted but her uncle and Wood's employer, William Henry Low objected to his niece marrying a "penniless adventurer"and forced her to abandon the arrangement. Wood spent the rest of his life as a bachelor. After moving to the Philippines, Wood became manager of a coffee and sugar plantation in Jalajala, Rizal and subsequently joined the office of Messrs. Russell & Sturgis in Manila. He is credited with introducing photography to the Philippines.

== Bibliography ==
- Sketches of China: with illustrations from original drawings. Carey & Lea, Philadelphia. 1830.
