= Russell & Company =

19th century American trading house in China

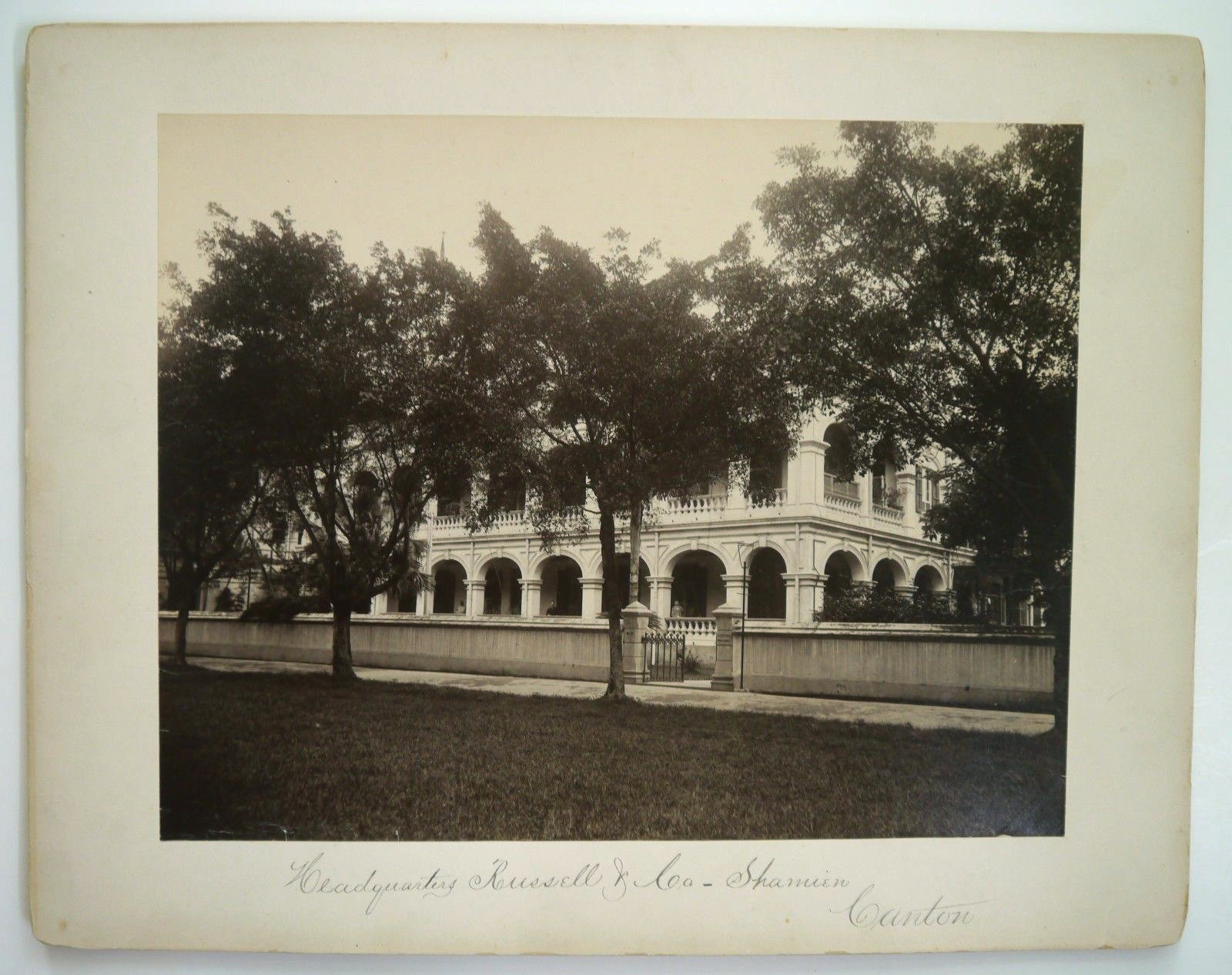
- Canton headquarters, c. 1880
- Native name: 旗昌洋行
- Type: Private
- Industry: International trade, shipping
- Founded: 1824
- Founder: Samuel Russell
- Defunct: 1891
- Fate: Dissolved
- Successor: Shewan & Company
- Headquarters: Canton (Guangzhou), Qing China
- Area served: Qing China, United States, British India
- Net income: 270,000 United States dollar
- Subsidiaries: Shanghai Steam Navigation Company

Russell & Company (Chinese: 旗昌洋行; pinyin: Qíchāng Yángháng; Jyutping: Kei4Coeng1 Joeng4Hong2) was the largest American trading house of the 19th century in China. It specialised in the trade of tea, silk, and opium, and was later involved in the maritime transport.

== Foundation ==
In 1818, Samuel Russell was approached by Providence merchants Edward C. Carrington, Cyrus Butler and Benjamin and Thomas Hoppin to be an employee of their new resident commission firm in Canton (now referred to as Guangzhou) under the name of Samuel Russell & Company. The contract would expire after five years and the profit accumulated would be split between all parties. Russell arrived in Canton in 1819 and established Samuel Russell & Co. By 1820 the company was experiencing financial difficulties as a result of an economic depression, the Panic of 1819, which lasted until the mid-1820s.

Due to these circumstances, Butler and Carrington left Samuel Russell & Co. in 1823 whilst the Hoppin brothers and Russell continued to do business in Canton. After the five-year contract expired in January 1824, Russell entered into a partnership with factory owner and former agent of Brown & Ives, Phillip Ammidon, to establish Russell & Company. Russell and Company's ventures into the opium trade began shortly after with Ammidon who set sail for India with the intention to deal in Indian opium.

== Beginnings ==
In its first year of operating, the company worked exclusively as a commission firm for China and America with either Russell or Ammidon traveling elsewhere to increase their connections. The two partners would spend two years in different locations with one of them residing in Canton and in 1827, instead of replacing Russell at his post at their main headquarters, Ammidon returned to the United States from his ventures in India and contracted William H. Low and Augustine Heard to relieve him of his duties. In 1830, Russell began a three-way partnership with Low and Heard excluding Ammidon from the new contract and forced him to resign from the company.

In August 1829, Thomas T. Forbes died in a typhoon near Macao leaving the position of resident partner Perkins & Co. vacant. Prior to his death, Forbes had written in a letter that Russell was to replace him if complications were to arise and John Perkins Cushing, who was Forbes's cousin and also the founder of Perkins & Company, accepted these conditions which lead to the decision to merge Perkins & Company and Russell & Company. Heard was appointed by Cushing to be a partner of the newly combined commission firm to manage the Perkins ships and Forbes's younger brother, John Murray Forbes would replace Heard's position as a clerk at Russell & Company. Russell and Cushing left Canton for Boston in August 1831, leaving the management of Russell & Co. to Heard and Low.

== Structure ==
The founding structure of Russell & Company was driven by driving American-Chinese commercialist groups at the beginning of the 19th century. The founder and main proprietor of Russell & Company, Samuel Russell, was originally a resident of Middletown, Connecticut, before establishing a contract with commercial agents and Providence merchants Cyrus Butler, Benjamin and Thomas Hoppin and Edward Carrington, who had previously served as American consul within China. According to the terms of the agreement, the providence merchants and the contractor (Samuel Russell) formed "a connexion in business at Canton in China, under the name of firm of Samuel Russell & Co. for the term of five years."

The early structure of the company was characterised as a contract arrangement, where Samuel Russell resided in Canton within the established trade house. The company was formed in first by the input of $20 000 USD in capital, arranged in conjunction between the contracting providence merchants (Butler, the Hoppin brothers and Carrington). Russell was not required to input capital; his responsibilities were to reside in the branch house in Canton and devote his time to the strict management of the trade house’s business. The merchants and Carrington were tasked with exerting their influence and capabilities in order to draw consignments and commercial growth toward the house. The main trading house was simple in framework. It consisted of a security merchant and various other employed traders who were responsible for market communication, accounting and the direct sale of goods. The commercial house was officially constructed in 1819 under the Company.

== Commercial Origins ==
The late nineteenth century saw a Chinese commercial culture that had become increasingly integrated with the market economy system of America. The century, especially the first half, was characterized by incessant growth in the American market, leading from socio-economic factors which included surges in industrial productivity and hence economic output. This economic trend was coupled an insurgency of fading protectionism within United States foreign policy, meaning that American commercialism and the rise of companies such as ‘Russell & Company”, were underpinned also by a national goal of economic expansion into Asian markets.

Russell & Company’s ability to quickly adapt to resource and supply demand within a bustling Chinese market acted as a hallmark of American foreign policy at the time toward new internationalised businesses. American foreign policy and trade were heavily intertwined in the first half of the century, as America sought to champion an international role that practiced free trade and that took advantage of open markets and un-capitalised demand. As a new country, the founding fathers were heavily focussed on an international economy, wherein America could utilise ambition in overseas markets in order to help drive and establish prosperity, wealth and interdependence within the domestic sphere of the nation.

This early advocacy for open trade in Sino markets is reciprocated in the American government’s endorsement of Russell & Company. Russell & Company, although commercially independent, stood as a representative pillar of a governmental aim to increase trade and development in an imperialistic and relatively under-developed modern market within Shanghai

== Expansion ==
Before the middle of the century Russell & Company were relatively under-developed and served as a commission house in the trade and sale of basic items. However, the company soon began to maintain a leading position within Chinese-American trade from 1844, following the growing commercial presence of United States merchants within Canton. The trading house was the first firm to be established in Shanghai. Soon after such expansion, the company set up a further agency in Fuzhow, and following this established a branch in Hong Kong two years later. Between the years of 1861 and 1864, Russell & Company expanded through coastal areas of China, establishing branches or agencies in areas such as Ningbo, Hankou, Zhenjiang and Tianjin.

In addition to this, the company soon moved from coastal areas to establish branches within interior areas of China, including regional areas. The company ran subsidiary enterprises; including a steam-ship company and a silk processing plant. Later branches would also sell insurance and deal in foreign exchange for overseas merchants and businesses. In 1849 the company amassed a capital profit of $220 000 USD which increased by $50 000USD into the period of 1860. These returns more than doubled some of Russell & Company’s closest competitors, including Augustine Head & co.

=== 1820s–1840s ===
Following the acquisition of Perkins & Co. in 1829, Russell and Co. inherited Cushing's extensive opium trading connections from across the globe. Their illegal trade at that time in Turkish opium via the island of Lintin in the Pearl River estuary was particularly lucrative. In 1831, son of theatre actors William B. Wood and Juliana Wood, William W. Wood was employed by Russell & Co. to be Low's secretary in February before leaving the company in July. Joseph Coolidge was then hired as a clerk to increase interest in trading opium in Parsee and Calcutta while Low was forced to leave in 1833. John C. Green was brought in as the new head of the firm and agent after Heard left Russell & Co. in January of the following year. In the same year, the East India Company's monopoly on the British China Trade came to an end and Russell & Co. entered into an unofficial partnership with two British firms, Jardine, Matheson, & Co. and Whiteman & Co., to further expand the opium trade in India.

Under Green's leadership, the firm underwent major changes to offset the influx of commissions and increase in workload, after a clerk, William C. Hunter fell ill and was not able to return until March 1833 and John M. Forbes was advised to set sail for America by his doctors. Forbes would only return in 1835 to find that he was contracted as a partner of Russell & Co. since the beginning of the year, an offer which he accepted. In 1836 Russell's nephew, Abiel A. Low, became a partner despite only having three years of experience as a clerk at Russell & Co., while Hunter was only given a share of Russell & Co. once Green relinquished one-sixteenth of his shares. From 1834 to 1836, the company saw a net profit of over $400,000 with an average of approximately $133,000 per year.

With Green announcing his retirement in 1838 and the expiration of their partnership in the beginning of 1840, John Forbes formed a new partnership with Robert B. Forbes and Warren Delano Jr. in 1839. In 1842, John Forbes made an attempt to hire his cousin Paul S. Forbes, a decision that was vetoed by the other partners until 1846 when Paul S. Forbes took over Robert Forbes's position as a partner of the firm. By the early 1840s, Russell & Co. had become the largest American trading house in China and maintained that position for decades.

=== Shanghai Steam Navigation Company (1846–1877) ===
In August 1846, W.P Peirce opened a branch in Shanghai and by 1852 the main headquarters of Russell & Co. was moved from Canton to Shanghai. To further expand their operations in the tea trade, a firm was set up in Fuzhou in 1853 and a branch was formed in Hong Kong in 1855. From 1861 to 1864, the company established multiple branches in Ningbo, Tianjin, Zhenjiang and Hankou. Briton Nichol Latimer (who was the publisher of the North China Herald which was the most influential newspaper in China) was the manager of Russell & Company's Shanghai Steam Navigation Co. until his death in 1865.

Russell & Co. debuted a subsidiary, Shanghai Steam Navigation Company (Shanghai S. N. Co.), under the guidance of partner Edward Cunningham in 1862. They began operations with 5 steamships which eventually expanded to 18 steamships by the 1870s. For the next 15 years, Shanghai S. N. Co. would average 12% in profit with their best year seeing a 50% return. With $1.35 million in initial capital, Shanghai S. N. Co. became the largest joint-stock company in China losing the title in 1865 to the Hong Kong and Shanghai Bank, to which they took second place. In 1866–67, Russell & Co. came to a quid pro quo agreement with competitors Jardines, Dent & Co., who owned Hong Kong, Canton & Macao Steamboat Company (HCMSB), and Augustine Heard & Co., where the former would abstain from trading on the Canton River and the latter would no longer trade on the Yangtze River. By February 1867, Shanghai S. N. Co. had arranged plans to purchase rival steamships that were operating on the Yangtze River. From then on SSNC would hold a monopoly on the river and two coastal routes, Shanghai and Ningbo and Shanghai and Tianjin. This monopoly was disrupted in 1871 with the arrival of China Navigation Co. Ltd (CNC) and China Coast Steam Navigation Co. (CCSNC), both founded by prominent British firms John Swire & Sons and Jardine, Matheson & Co., respectively.

=== Steamships owned by Shanghai S. N. Co. ===
Name	Active Period	Location (under the ownership of Shanghai S. N. Co)
Surprise (惊异)	1861–1862	Yangtze River
Kiangse (Kiangsu)	1861–1877	Shanghai
Pembroke	1862–1865	Shanghai Yangtze River
Huquang (Ou-Guang)	1862–1866	Yangtze River
Chekiang	1862–1864	Yangtze River Hankou
Shanse	1862–1877	Shanghai Shanghai-Tianjin route Yangtze
Szecheun	1862–1875	Ningbo Shanghai-Tianjin route Yangtze River Shanghai
Tsatlee	1862–1877	Shanghai-Wusong
Fohkien	1863–1865	Hong Kong-Shanghai
Moyune	1865–1873	Shanghai Hong Kong Yangtze River
Fire Queen	1865–1877	Yangtze River
Kiukiang	1865–1866	Hong Kong-Canton
Poyang	1865–1866	Hong Kong-Macao
Fusiyama	1866–1877	N/A
Hirado	1866–1877	N/A
Plymouth Rock	1866–1877	Hong Kong-Canton Yangtze River
Kiang Loong	1867–1873	Yangtze River

== Diplomatic Role ==
Russell & Company was born within a turbulent period within Chinese history and in a turbulent context of Chinese-America relations. The dissolution of the British East India Company’s overarching control of Chinese trade and the expansion of the trade and use of opium changed Chinese-Western relations. The effects of British pre-occupation and western commercialism had constructed Chinese resentment within areas of government and citizenship. However, Russell & Company’s ability to remain firm within areas such as Canton, sought the admiration of many Western counterparts. The company’s position within China improved relations via its effect on Chinese regional and urban economies. Before its existence, Western merchants were relatively isolated in their conduct of business, due to government pressure and an increased awareness of a growing opium trade.

As the largest trading firm within China and much of Asia in its totality, the company both conducted commercial business and worked for capital but also influenced and directed American foreign policy at the time. The company did this by exerting their financial position

and their superiority in the Chinese trade market which platformed company officials with a tacit leadership over the American communities in China and the direction of commercialist strategies in many areas of trade and business. The company implored congress to participate in the concern of Western nations in their growing desire to establish stable commercial relations with China. Robert Forbes, director of Russell & Company at the time even wrote to encourage the construction of a sufficient naval force that would safeguard American business pursuits, lives and property within China.

== Opium Trade ==
It is believed that American traders and merchants within the Russell & Company were involved with the trade and sale of Opium from an early period in the company’s beginnings. The trade and sale of opium originally arose within the company to fulfill ongoing trade deficits in substitute of products such as silver. By the closing period of the 1820’s, the delivery of Opium into the Russell controlled area of Canton was believed to be around 1500 chest annually: equating roughly 2 million USD$ worth of Opium.

Russell & Company’s history in the opium trade was rooted in its precursor establishment as ‘Perkins & Co’, which was responsible for the organization and coordination of drug trading throughout parts of Europe and the Mediterranean, mainly including Turkey. The origins of this trade were born in the shipping of the drug from Smyrna to Canton within early parts of the 1800’s, suggesting that members of Russell & Company’s founding group were well versed and acquainted with the Opium trade and the key figures of its supply and demand throughout parts of both Europe and Asia.

The War of 1812 temporarily restricted the movements and expansion of the drug throughout trade routes. Following this however came the introduction of Indian opium, which heralded a new opportunity for many traders.

Russell & Company were one of the first American trade houses to conduct transactions consisting of Indian based Opium. Following the company’s opening formation, one of the two resident Canton partners of the company travelled to India in order to work and maintain development of supply streams for the Russell & Company.[3] Succeeding this, Russell & Company developed their own unique streams of supply and trade to dominate the market of opium within Canton nearing the middle of the century and specifically in the opening years of the 1830’s.

By the late 1820’s, Russell & Company were the biggest supplier of Indian based trade Opium into China. To continue and maintain this status, the company attained the employment of several American merchant traders within India, including J, B Higginson, J Church, and P Dixwell. These merchants were essentially developed into traders who were passed with the responsibility of developing supply streams, purchasing opium and assisting in the completion of international transactions and transport to Canton.

In Canton, one of the central partners of Russell & Company, Augustine Heard, also maintained trade ties with the banian office of Anshootos Day, transacting large amounts of opium. In the opening months of 1831, Russell & Company had successfully smuggled of 3, 500 chests of Indian opium into China; equal to twenty percent of the total amount of opium imported into China in the whole of 1831 alone.

== Impacts of American foreign policy and International Relations ==
American foreign policy throughout the period of Russell & Company’s formation was largely influenced by attitudes of assertive expansion and aggressive Western commercialism that were thought governmentally necessary for a relatively new country that sought domestic stability and economic interdependency. Into the controversial trade of Opium and the growing impact of foreign commercialism on Chinese security, trade-house enterprises such as Russell & Company soon began to pressure the American government to finalise a treaty of commercialism and trade that would aid tensions with China and assist in the continuation of overseas American companies and a flowing international economy.

Ultimately however, pressures from American and Western governments did not highly impact the commercial interests and ambitions of Russell & Company, even during the Opium wars wherein the company sought to operate as independently as possible in order to continue to fulfil profit margins. An example of this is during the opium war of 1840, wherein Russell & Company acquired a British owned ship entering Huangpu. The Ship had been sold in desperation as the owner knew of the risk of operating the ship within a known warzone. Named the ‘Chesapeake’, Russell & Company ended in selling the vessel to the Chinese Government for an exorbitant price, exemplifying Russell’s dedication to enterprise and independent commercialism.

The founder of Russell & Company in the earlier 1800’s withheld a voice of assertive care however for the situation of foreign policy and its contribution in commercial American expansion within China. Carrington as one of the early fathers of the company and scripters of its approach to trade, was in frequent contact with members for congress, close government officials and members of office regarding discussions of American expansion within China, the preferred character of assigned consuls and American representatives, as well as the most appropriate approach to expanding industry in a country infamous for seeking to limit Western contact.

== Decline ==
The decline of Russell & Company was led by a transformation in Chinese trade. The Second Opium War and the Tianjin Treaties in particular shifted more autonomy toward Western countries within regard to the extent of their dealings within China. Opium importation was eventually illegalized and more ports were established. Government regulation and inspection system meant that competition intensified and the former houses of trade met new challenges that they could not meet. Russell and Company failed to adapt to these new conditions as their trading structure had once relied on a heavily autonomous structure amongst a little number of rivals and a lack of government intervention and regulation.

The civil war in America also disrupted the company’s ability to influence foreign policy, meaning that the power and influence they once held began to quickly diminish. The company was without funds, federal backing and support from importers and purchasers who had been affected by both the civil war and the internal shifts of domestic China. Russell & Company relied heavily on an old framework of commercial business, but as time went on, businessmen and traders began processes of outsourcing and no longer confined trade to one house or dependency. Revolution in steam transport and continued industrialization altered shipping processes, meaning the former framework by which the company relied, failed; meaning the company met significant losses at the hands of newer firms who were more able to adapt business models which were not pre-conformed. Alterations in communication methods also cause significant problems for Russell & Company. The failure to obtain communication regarding market fluctuations at the head of further competitors disadvantaged the historic firm even further.

In the 1860s, the China trade underwent a series of transformation which was the result of more competition from their British rivals and the shortened length of time that was needed to commute to locations with the opening of the Suez Canal in 1869. By the 1870s, Russell & Co. were forced to seize their banking operations as the lucrative importing of precious metals were eventually overtaken by newer commission firms and professional banks. Initially, Shanghai S. N. Co. was established to counter their losses, however their rates of return would continue to decrease and in 1877 they were acquired by the China Merchants Steam Navigation Company alongside their waterfront properties. Facing further financial difficulties, the company devolved into Shewan & Company in 1891.

== Competitors ==
=== Russell, Sturgis & Company ===
Russell Sturgis & Co. was established in 1834 as a branch of a Manila commission firm Russell & Sturgis under the guidance of Cushing. The founder, George R. Russell (no relation to Samuel Russell) was the nephew of Ammidon. The similarities in naming became important to note for the partners of Russell & Co. though Russell, Sturgis & Co. would never address it. By 1840, the firm was acquired by Russell & Co.

=== Augustine Heard & Company ===
Heard and Coolidge formed a rival merchant house Augustine Heard & Co. in 1840 after there were disagreements between the partners of Russell & Company. The firm was managed mainly by Heard's nephews and had branch offices in Shanghai and Hong Kong.

=== Olyphant & Company ===
Olyphant & Co. was formed by Protestant missionary, D.W.C Olyphant, in the early 1810s who opposed the opium trade on moral grounds as a result of his Christian principles. John M. Forbes wrote in a memo to Heard that he should remain “on [his] guard” due to Olyphant's vocal disavowal of their practices.

=== Jardine, Matheson & Company ===
Founded in July 1832 by Scots William Jardine and James Matheson, the commission firm dealt heavily in opium and had inherited connections in India from merchant John Richardson Latimer, who was an American relation of the aforementioned Briton Nichol Latimer who was the manager of Russell & Company's Shanghai Steam Navigation Co. until his death in 1865. John Richardson Latimer refused to work for Russell & Co. prior to his retirement. Its steamship subsidiary CCSNC became a direct competitor of Shanghai Steam Navigation Co. and would later be known as Jardine Matheson & Co. Ltd.

=== Butterfield & Swire ===
Owner of a London-based commission firm, John Swire & Sons, John S. Swire collaborated with wool manufacturer, Robert S. Butterfield to establish a Chinese firm, Butterfield & Swire, in 1866, after a brief trip to Shanghai. Much like Russell & Co., Butterfield & Swire was a commission firm concerned mostly with merchandise in its first few years of operation before establishing their shipping branch, CNC. Swire once wrote that "the Shanghai S. N. Co.'s shares would never have seen a premium," citing this as the reason for entering the Yangtze steamship trade, a prospect he had expressed interest in as early as 1867.

== Notable people of Russell & Company ==
=== Partners ===
- Warren Delano Jr., the grandfather of Franklin Roosevelt (32nd President of the United States), in the 1860s, having first joined in 1833 and served as the Chief of Operations of Russell & Company in Canton.
- Robert Bennet Forbes (1804–1889) was the head of Russell and Company.
- John Murray Forbes (1813–1898), brother of R B. Forbes and the great-granduncle of 2004 presidential candidate John Forbes Kerry.
- William Howell Forbes, R B Forbes' nephew, head partner in 1884.
- John Cleve Green (1800–1875) Philanthropist - benefactor of Princeton University.
- Augustine Heard, who later founded Augustine Heard & Company, a large trading house in China.
- Nichol Latimer, publisher of North China Herald, was manager of Russell & Company's Shanghai Steam Navigation Co. until 1865.
- Abiel Abbot Low, William H Low's nephew, founder of trading company A. A. Low & Brothers, served as a partner.
- William Henry Low, senior partner of the firm.
- Russell Sturgis, who later became head of Baring Brothers in London.
- George Tyson, in the 1850s in Hong Kong
