= Walter Cole Brigham =

American artist (1870–1941)

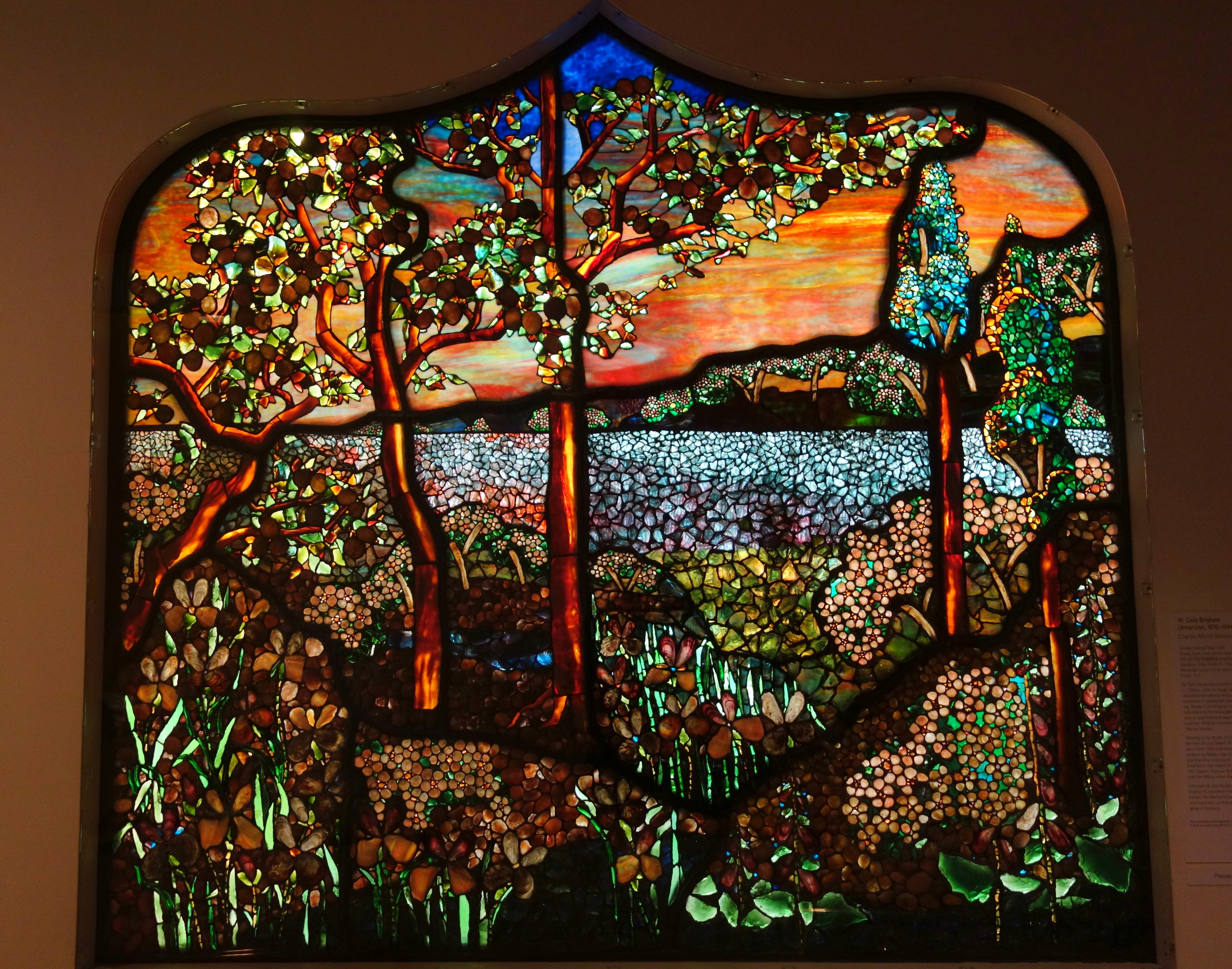
Charles Merrill Memorial Window by W. Cole Brigham, Shelter Island, New York, 1912

Walter Cole Brigham (January 11, 1870 – August 7, 1941) was an American artist, now best known for his innovative stained glass techniques incorporating transparent shells, pebbles, and beach glass, and for his illustrations of pulp magazines.

Brigham was born in Baltimore, Maryland, to Marion B. and William Theodore Brigham, who owned the Swift Meat Packing Company of Baltimore and the Greenport Shipbuilding Company of Shelter Island, New York. As a child, he lived at 406 Pressman Street in Baltimore. In 1888 he graduated from high school and entered Johns Hopkins University, but became ill in 1892 and did not complete his degree. He also studied at the Decorative and Maryland Institute Schools, received art training from André Castaigne, and later studied with William Merritt Chase (1849-1916) at the Art Students League.

On December 8, 1892, the World's Fair Commission chose his design for the Maryland Medal. In 1898 he spent a year in Florence, Italy, studying art, returning in 1899 to his parents' home on Shelter Island. In 1906 he completed a stained glass window in memory of Brooklyn banker Frederick A. Schroeder in the Union Chapel in the Grove on Shelter Island, and in 1909 he created a similar design for actor William Gillette's houseboat.

On September 23, 1911, he married Jeanette Lawson, with whom he had two sons. By 1926 he had begun to illustrate magazines, including Ginger, Pep, and Hot Stuff, and in 1928 his work began to appear in pulp magazines, including covers for Clues Detective Stories, The Dragnet, Rangeland Love, Popular Engineering Stories, and The Underworld. From 1935 to 1939 his drawings appeared in comic books produced by Centaur Comics, Harry "A" Chesler, DC Comics and Dell Publishing.

Brigham died in 1941 at Shelter Harbor.
