= Samuel S. Powell =

American politician (1815–1879)

Samuel Stringham Powell (February 16, 1815 – February 6, 1879) was an American businessman, politician, and Mayor of Brooklyn.

== Life ==
Powell was born on February 16, 1815, in New York City, New York, on Water Street, the son of Jonah Powell and Abigail Stillwell.

When Powell was 13, family reverses led him to begin working, initially with a New York store. In 1828, he moved to Brooklyn and began working for Sylvanus B. Stillwell, the city's leading clothier. After four years, he began working on his own and became a successful businessman. He was a director of the Central Bank, the Citizens Gas Light Co., and the Nassau and Lafayette Insurance Companies.

In 1845, Powell was elected alderman of Second Ward as a Democrat. He was later elected Mayor of Brooklyn, serving in the office from 1857 to 1861. He was later re-elected as Mayor and served from 1872 to 1873. In 1874, he was elected Comptroller. In 1877, he was appointed Park Commissioner. He was then elected County Treasurer, and his term for the office began in 1878, but his declining health meant he did little in that position.

In 1837, Powell married Huldah A. Frazer. They had two children, Thomas Frazer and William Stilwell.

Powell died at home from cancer on February 6, 1879. He was buried in his family plot in Green-Wood Cemetery.

Political offices
Preceded by George Hall	Mayor of Brooklyn; 1857–1861	Succeeded by Martin Kalbfleisch
Preceded by Martin Kalbfleisch	Mayor of Brooklyn; 1872–1873	Succeeded by John W. Hunter
