= Mugwumps =

Dissident Republican activists in 1884

- Leader: Henry Adams; Edward Atkinson; Charles Francis Adams Jr.
- Founded: 1884
- Dissolved: c. 1894
- Split from: Republican Party; Half-Breed faction
- Preceded by: Liberal Republican Party; Half-Breed faction of the Republican Party
- Merged into: Democratic Party; Republican Party
- Ideology: Anti-corruption; Classical liberalism Liberalism; Pro-civil service reform Pro-Cleveland
- National affiliation: Republican Party

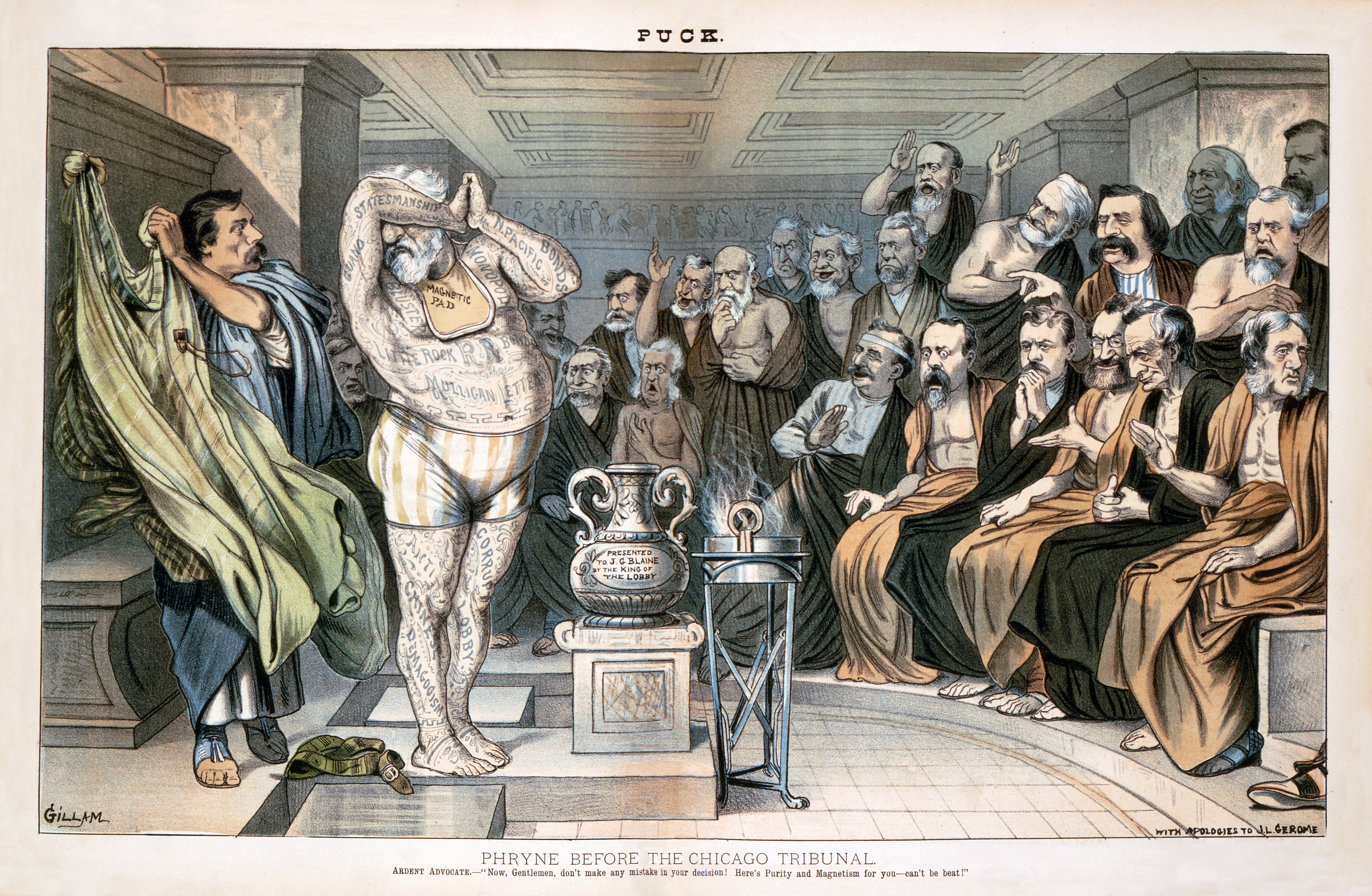
1884 cartoon by Bernhard Gillam in Puck magazine which ridicules James G. Blaine as the man tattooed with many indelible scandals. A parody of Phryne Before the Areopagus, an 1861 painting by French artist Jean-Léon Gérôme.

The Mugwumps were Republican political activists in the United States who were intensely opposed to political corruption. They famously switched parties from the Republican Party by supporting the Democratic candidate Grover Cleveland in the 1884 United States presidential election, due to their rejection of the long history of corruption associated with the Republican candidate James G. Blaine. Despite never formally organizing, the Mugwumps claimed that their influence was the reason that Grover Cleveland won a close election in New York, which in turn gave him enough electoral college votes to win the presidency. The jocular word "mugwump," noted as early as 1832 and applied to these activists derisively, is from Algonquian mugquomp, "important person, kingpin" (from mugumquomp, "war leader"), implying that Mugwumps were sanctimonious or "holier-than-thou" in refusing to be beholden to partisanship.

After the election, "mugwump" survived for more than a decade as an epithet for a party bolter in American politics. Many Mugwumps became Democrats or remained independents, and most continued to support reform well into the 20th century. During the Third Party System, party loyalty was in high regard, and independents were rare. Theodore Roosevelt stunned his upper-class New York City friends by supporting Blaine in 1884; by rejecting the Mugwumps, he kept alive his Republican Party leadership, clearing the way for his own political aspirations.

New England and the Northeast had been a stronghold of the Republican Party since the Civil War era, but the Mugwumps considered Blaine to be an untrustworthy and fraudulent candidate. Their idealism and reform sensibilities led them to oppose the rampant political corruption of the Gilded Age.

Mugwumps tended to be Anglo-Saxon Protestants who had been educated at prestigious universities. They felt that the government should be an aristocracy, led by elites who resist influence outside of the public good, as well as the influence of populism.

== Patronage and politics ==
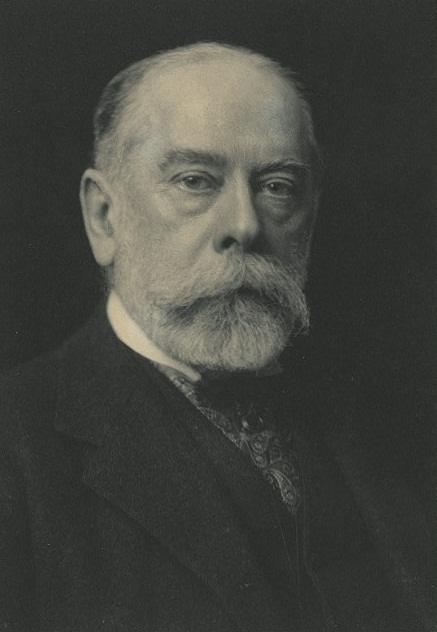
Many editors supported the cause, such as E.L. Godkin

Political patronage, also known as the spoils system, was the issue that angered many reform-minded Republicans, leading them to reject Blaine's candidacy. In the spoils system, the winning candidate would dole out government positions to those who had supported his political party prior to the election. Although the Pendleton Act of 1883 established the United States Civil Service Commission and made competency and merit the base qualifications for government positions, its effective implementation was slow. Political affiliation continued to be the basis for appointment to many positions.

In the early 1880s, the issue of political patronage split the Republican Party down the middle for several consecutive sessions of Congress. The party was divided into two warring factions, each with creative names. The side that held the upper hand in numbers and popular support were the Half-Breeds, led by Senator James Blaine of Maine. The Half-Breeds supported civil service reform and often blocked legislation and political appointments put forth by their main congressional opponents, the Stalwarts, led by Roscoe Conkling of New York.

Blaine was from the reform wing of his own party, but the Mugwumps rejected his candidacy. This division among Republicans may have contributed to the victory in 1884 of Grover Cleveland, the first President elected from the Democratic party since the Civil War. In the period from 1874 to 1894, presidential elections were closely contested at the national level, but the states themselves were mostly dominated by a single party, with Democrats prevailing in the South and the Republicans in the Northeast. Although the defection of the Mugwumps may have helped Cleveland win in New York, one of the few closely contested states, historians attribute Cleveland's victory nationwide to the rising power of urban immigrant voters.

== Policies and laws ==
In Massachusetts, Mugwumps were led by Richard Henry Dana III, (1851–1931), the editor of the Civil Service Record. They took credit for passing the state's 1884 civil service law, which was a stronger version of the federal Pendleton Act of 1883. Both laws were enacted to limit the effect of political patronage, thus disrupting the spoils system. The goals were improved morality and increased efficiency. The 1884 law was also designed to contain the rising political power of the Irish Catholics.

James C. Carter (1827–1905) was a leading New York lawyer and an influential legal theorist among fellow Mugwumps. Carter distrusted elected officials, accusing them of being faithful to special interests that help elect them, rather than to the public good. He was a proponent of anticodification, which is the idea of using judicial precedent to practice law instead of codifying the law itself. Carter was influenced by the concept of the "positive liberal state" from the Whigs, as well as by the Jacksonian skepticism of government actions "such as protective tariffs, bounties, and subsidies, by which a government confers favours".

A new class of experts needed new modes of training, and those were provided by the new American graduate schools, built along German models. A leading organizer was the German-trained scholar Herbert Baxter Adams (1850–1901), head of the history and political science department at the Johns Hopkins University 1882–1901. He promoted mugwump reform at Hopkins and nationally. Under his direction, the faculty and advanced students worked for numerous reforms, including civil service reform in the Pendleton Act (1883), municipal reform with the New Charter of Baltimore (1895), the training of professional social workers, and efforts to solve labor unrest. Raymond Cunningham argues that his reformism shows that the Mugwump movement could attract affirmative and optimistic experts, rather than just suspicious or cautious patricians.

In Chicago, the Mugwump reformers worked through the Citizens' Association of Chicago, the Chicago Civic Federation, and the Municipal Voters' League. They opposed corruption, government subsidies, high taxes, and public enterprise. However they also wanted government to solve the problems of the rapidly growing metropolis. This was only possible if the voters were better informed. The newspapers adopted Mugwumpery as a way of building support for municipal reform among working-class voters in the two decades after the 1871 fire. The key leader was Joseph Medill, owner and editor of the Chicago Tribune.

== Historical appraisals ==
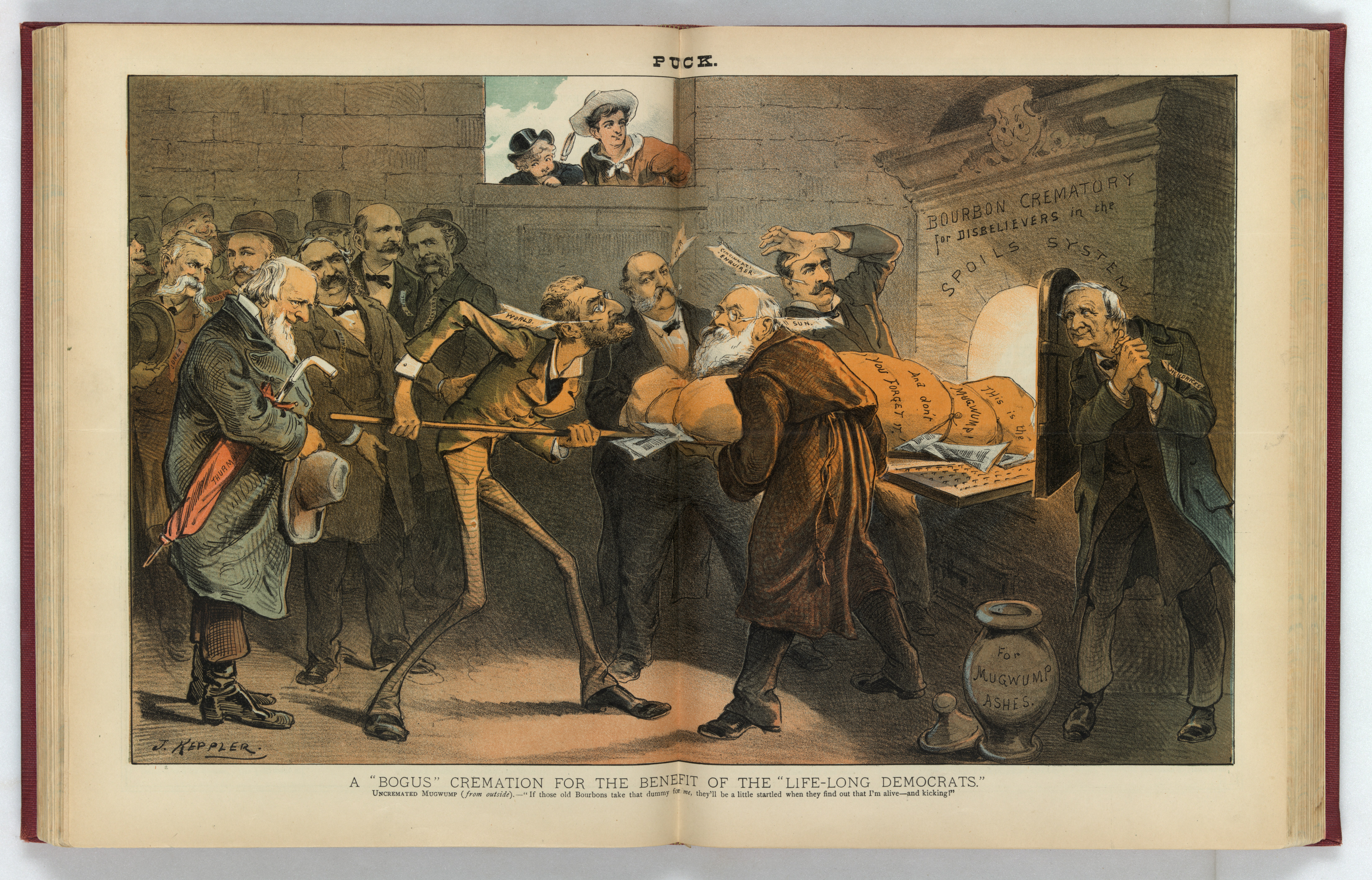
A "bogus" cremation for the benefit of the "life-long Democrats" 1885 cartoon by Joseph Keppler from Puck magazine

Several historians of the 1950s through 1970s portrayed the Mugwumps as members of an insecure elite, one that felt threatened by changes in American society. These historians often focused on the social background and status of their subjects and the narratives they have written share a common outlook.

Mugwumps tended to come from old Protestant families of New York and New England and often from inherited wealth. They belonged to or identified with the emerging business and professional elite and were often members of the most exclusive clubs. Yet they felt threatened by the rise of machine politics, one aspect of which was the spoils system; and by the rising power of both immigrants and of multi-millionaires in American society. They excelled as authors and essayists, yet their writings indicated their social position and class loyalties. In politics, they tended to be ineffectual and unsuccessful, unable and unwilling to operate effectively in a political environment where patronage was the norm.

In his 1998 work, historian David Tucker attempts to rehabilitate the Mugwumps. According to Tucker, the Mugwumps embodied the liberalism of the 19th century and their rejection by 20th-century historians, who embraced the government intervention of the New Deal and the Great Society, is not surprising. To Tucker, their eloquent writings speak for themselves and are testament to a high minded civic morality.

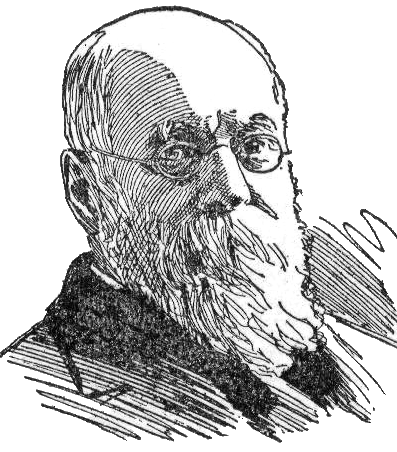
Charles Anderson Dana

== Etymology ==
Dictionaries report that "mugguomp" is an Algonquian word meaning "person of importance" or "war leader". The Indianapolis Sentinel pinned the moniker on the Independents in 1872, but it was Charles Anderson Dana, the colorful newspaperman and editor of the now-defunct New York Sun, who revived it in March 1884, after which it achieved far wider currency. Dana made the term plural and derided them as amateurs and public moralists.

During the 1884 campaign, they were often portrayed as "fence-sitters", with part of their body on the side of the Democrats and the other on the side of the Republicans. Their "mug" on one side of the fence, and their "wump" (comic mispronunciation of "rump") on the other. Angry Republicans like Roscoe Conkling sometimes hinted they were homosexual, calling them "man milliners".

The epithet "goody-goody" from the 1890s goo-goo, a corruption of "good government", was used in a similar derogatory manner. Whereas "mugwump" has become an obscure and almost forgotten political moniker, "goo-goo" was revived, especially in Chicago, by the political columns of Mike Royko.

== Notable Mugwumps ==
- Charles Francis Adams Jr., president of the Union Pacific Railroad and the American Historical Association
- Henry Adams, author
- Edward Atkinson, entrepreneur and business executive
- Louis Brandeis, future Supreme Court Justice
- Charles William Eliot, President of Harvard University
- Josiah Willard Gibbs, professor of physics at Yale University
- E.L. Godkin, editor of The Nation
- Seth Low, Republican mayor of Brooklyn in 1884 who lost his party's support due to his backing Cleveland.
- Joseph Medill, owner and editor of the Chicago Tribune.
- Thomas Nast, political cartoonist
- Carl Schurz, former Senator from Missouri and Secretary of the Interior as well as editor of the New York Post
- Moorfield Storey, lawyer and NAACP president from 1909 to 1915.
- William Graham Sumner, social scientist, Yale University
- Mark Twain, author self-identified as a Mugwump in his essay Christian Science
- Horace White, editor of the Chicago Tribune

== See also ==
- Carpetbagger – Pejorative for Northerners who moved South after the American Civil War
- Civil service reform in the United States
- Goo-goos – Term used to refer to believers in "good government"
- Never Trump – Conservative opposition to Donald Trump
- Reagan Democrat – Democratic voters who supported Republican president Ronald Reagan
- Republican In Name Only – Pejorative term to describe Republican politicians
- Scalawag – 1860s American term
