= Mary Hillard Loines =

Suffragist

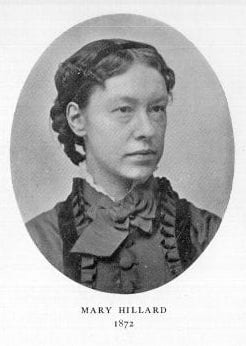
- Born: Mary Hillard; 4 May 1844; London, England
- Died: 1 April 1944 (aged 99); Winter Park, Florida
- Occupations: Suffragist, civic worker
- Spouse: Stephen Loines (m. 1872)
- Children: Russell Hillard Loines (1874–1922); Hilda Loines (1878-1969); Elma Loines (1882–1983); Sylvia Loines Dalton (1885–1974)
- Parents: John Hillard (father); Harriet Low (mother)
- Relatives: Abiel Abbot Low (uncle)

Mary Hillard Loines (4 May 1844 – 1 April 1944) was a suffragist and civic worker, the daughter of writer Harriet Low.

== Life ==
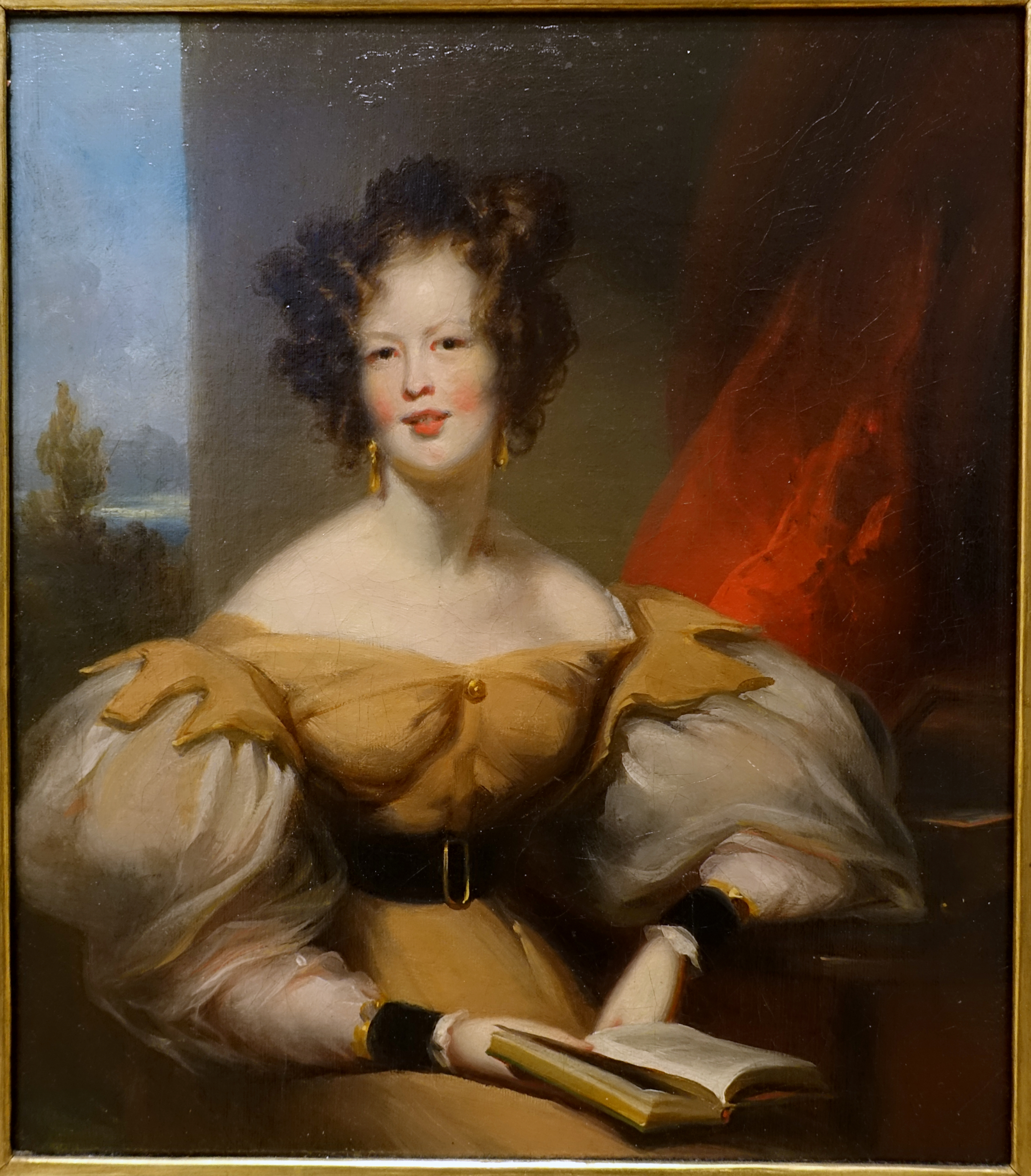
Mary's mother, Harriet Low

Mary Hillard Loines was born on 4 May 1844 in London, England, to American-born parents John Hillard and Harriet Low, who had emigrated to England soon after they married. The family returned to America in 1848, settling in Brooklyn, New York. For a period following the Civil War, Hillard worked as a teacher for the National Freedmen's Relief Association, helping to educate those emancipated from enslavement. She became a strong advocate for the Tuskegee Institute and the Hampton Institute, both of which were created as educational establishments for African-Americans.

Hillard subsequently worked as a secretary for G. P. Putnam's Sons publishers before her marriage, in 1872, to insurance broker Stephen Loines, with whom she had four children: Russell Hillard, Hilda, Elma, and Sylvia.

Hillard Loines had been an active suffragist before her marriage, having been elected secretary of the Brooklyn Equal Rights Association in 1869, and continued for over five decades. She became a central figure in the New York State suffrage movement, and in 1899 travelling with state Governor Theodore Roosevelt to a suffrage convention. Along with a group of other activists, she met privately with Roosevelt to discuss the enfranchisement of New York women.

For two decades, between 1899 and 1919, Loines led the Brooklyn Women's Suffrage Association, and became actively involved with the League of Women Voters after women won the franchise. Loines was also prominent in other activism surrounding human rights, including in prison reform, and as a founder and organiser of the Consumers League of New York.

Stephen Loines died in 1919, remembered as a 'leading insurance broker' and 'yachting enthusiast'. Mary Hillard Loines survived him for nearly 15 years, dying in 1944, aged 99, in a nursing home in Florida.

Loines' son, Russell, a lawyer and lover of poetry, assisted in establishing Dongan Hall school on Staten Island. A poetry prize was established in his name at the National Institute of Arts and Letters.
