= John W. Hunter =

American politician

John Hunter
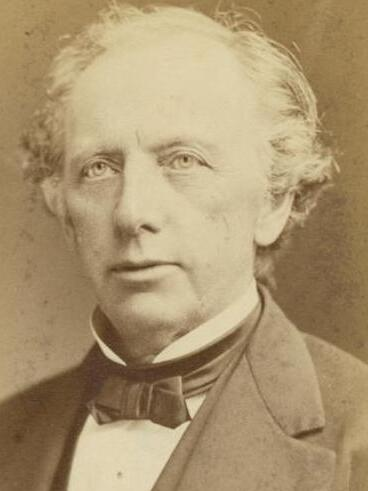
- Hunter, c. 1867

Mayor of Brooklyn
- In office 1874–1875
- Preceded by: Samuel S. Powell
- Succeeded by: Frederick A. Schroeder

Member of the U.S. House of Representatives from New York's 3rd district
- In office December 4, 1866 – March 3, 1867
- Preceded by: James Humphrey
- Succeeded by: William Robinson

Personal details
- Born: John Ward Hunter; October 15, 1807 Brooklyn, New York, U.S. (now New York City)
- Died: April 16, 1900 (aged 92) New York City, New York, U.S.
- Party: Democratic

John Ward Hunter (October 15, 1807 – April 16, 1900) was an American banker and politician who served briefly as a United States representative from New York from late 1866 to early 1867. He also served as mayor of Brooklyn.

== Biography ==
Born in Bedford neighborhood of Brooklyn (now known as Bedford Stuyvesant), he received a liberal schooling and was a clerk in a wholesale grocery store in New York City in 1824. He was a clerk in the U.S. Custom House at New York City from 1831 to 1836, and was assistant auditor of the customhouse from 1836 to 1865.

He engaged in banking as treasurer of the Dime Savings Bank in Brooklyn.

=== Congress ===
He was elected as a Democrat to the Thirty-ninth Congress to fill the vacancy caused by the death of James Humphrey. Hunter held office from December 4, 1866 to March 3, 1867; while in Congress, he was censured by the House of Representatives on January 26, 1867 for the use of unparliamentary language. He was not a candidate for renomination in 1866.

=== Mayor ===
In 1875 and 1876 he was mayor of Brooklyn. His successor as mayor was Frederick A. Schroeder, a Republican. Hunter was elected the first President of the Society of Old Brooklynites. The prestigious civic organization which was founded in 1880, still holds monthly public meetings in the Brooklyn Surrogate's Courtroom. He resumed banking and died in Brooklyn; interment was in Green-Wood Cemetery.

Hunter was censured by the United States House of Representatives. This was the tenth time in American history that a Representative was censured. The report cites "Insulted another member during debate (January 26, 1867)" as the reason for this condemnation.

== See also ==
- List of United States representatives expelled, censured, or reprimanded

U.S. House of Representatives
Preceded by James Humphrey	Member of the U.S. House of Representatives from New York's 3rd congressional district 1866–1867	Succeeded by William Robinson
Political offices
Preceded by Samuel S. Powell	Mayor of Brooklyn; 1874–1875	Succeeded by Frederick A. Schroeder
