= Frederick A. Schroeder =

American politician

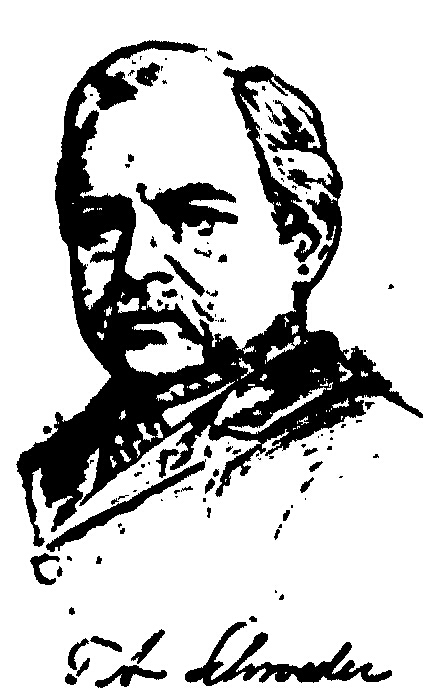

18th Mayor of Brooklyn
- In office 1876–1877
- Preceded by: John W. Hunter
- Succeeded by: James Howell

New York State Senate
- In office 1880–1881
- Preceded by: John C. Jacobs
- Succeeded by: Charles H. Russell

Personal details
- Born: March 9, 1833 Trier, Germany
- Died: December 1, 1899 (aged 66)
- Cause of death: pneumonia
- Resting place: Green-Wood Cemetery
- Party: Republican
- Spouse: Mary Jane Rusher
- Occupation: Cigar manufacturer

Frederick A. Schroeder (March 9, 1833 – December 1, 1899) was an American industrialist and politician of German descent. As mayor of Brooklyn—before the city's merger with New York—and New York state senator, Schroeder earned a reputation for his fight against the political machine of the Brooklyn ring and for more efficient city government.

== Youth in Prussia ==
Frederick A. Schroeder was born in Trier, Kingdom of Prussia. His father Michael Schroeder was a merchant who later worked as a surveyor. From 1841, Schroeder was a pupil of the Friedrich-Wilhelm-Gymnasium in Trier, one of Germany's oldest institutions of secondary education, from which Karl Marx had graduated in 1835. Schroeder's academic achievements, however, were poor. In 1848, he dropped out of the school. In the same year, Schroeder's mother, Salomé née Abel, died. One year later, Schroeder, together with his father and two sisters, left Trier and emigrated to the US. Frederick A. Schroeder's oldest brother stayed in Germany, but joined the rest of the family a few years later. The decision of the Schroeder family to leave Germany was probably linked to the events of the revolution of 1848. Michael Schroeder seems to have sympathized with the democratic cause. The family arrived in the USA on May 10, 1849 and settled in Williamsburg, Brooklyn.

== Economic success ==
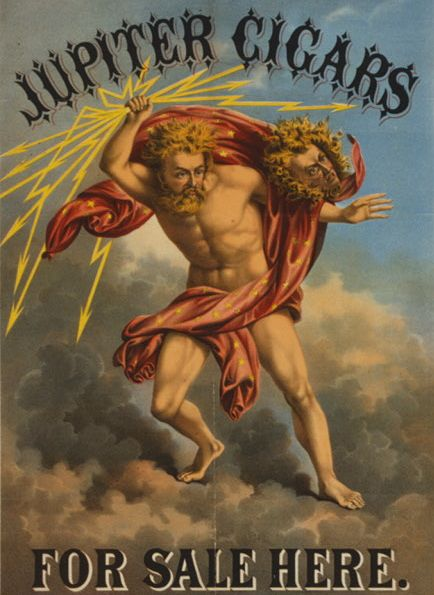
Jupiter throwing a bolt of lightning, package label for Jupiter Cigars, a brand marketed by the firm of Schroeder & Bon (c. 1868).

Even before leaving Germany, Schroeder seems to have learned the trade of a cigar worker. After his arrival in America, Schroeder started earning money by rolling cigars. Already in 1852 Schroeder was able to found his own Tobacco Manufacture. In 1863, Schroeder took on Isidore M. Bon as a partner and continued his business under the firm "Schroeder & Bon".

In 1867 the firm of Schroeder & Bon switched its business activities from the production of cigars to the importation of tobacco leaves. The firm—and Schroeder personally—are credited with the introduction of shade tobacco, then an important innovation.

When Isidore M. Bon retired from the firm in 1893, Schroeder's son, Edwin A. Schroeder (1859—1902) and his son in law, Frank M. Arguimbau became partners in the firm.

His success in the tobacco business enabled Schroeder to start other business projects. He played an important role in the development of Shelter Island and built his own summer residence there. In 1867, Schroeder was one of the founders of Germania Savings Bank. Schroeder remained president of the bank until his death.

=== Supreme Court Cases involving Schroeder & Bon ===
The economic success of the firm of Schroeder & Bon is also indicated by the fact that they were involved in several high-profile commercial cases which were decided by the US Supreme Court:

In 1894, the firm was the losing party in the Supreme Court case of Erhardt v. Schroeder, 155 U.S. 124 (1894), which concerned the customs duties due on a shipment of tobacco.

In 1905, the Supreme Court decided the case of Allen v. Arguimbau, 198 U.S. 149 (1905), which concerned issues of federal jurisdiction. Defendant Frank M. Arguimbau was sued in his capacity as surviving partner of the firm of Schroeder & Bon.

== Political career ==
In 1871 Schroeder was nominated by the Republican party for the office of comptroller of Brooklyn. He was elected and served for one year. During his term, Schroeder sought to improve the city's financial situation and fought against the "Brooklyn ring" a political machine ran by the "Boss" of the Democratic party, Hugh McLaughlin. Schroeder reportedly even took some corrupt officials to court and forced them to pay back public money they had put in their own pockets. Schroeder did not seek re-election, but ran for mayor in 1875. He was elected and used his term to continue the fight against corruption. During Schroeder's tenure, Ocean Parkway was opened and the first wire of Brooklyn Bridge was strung.

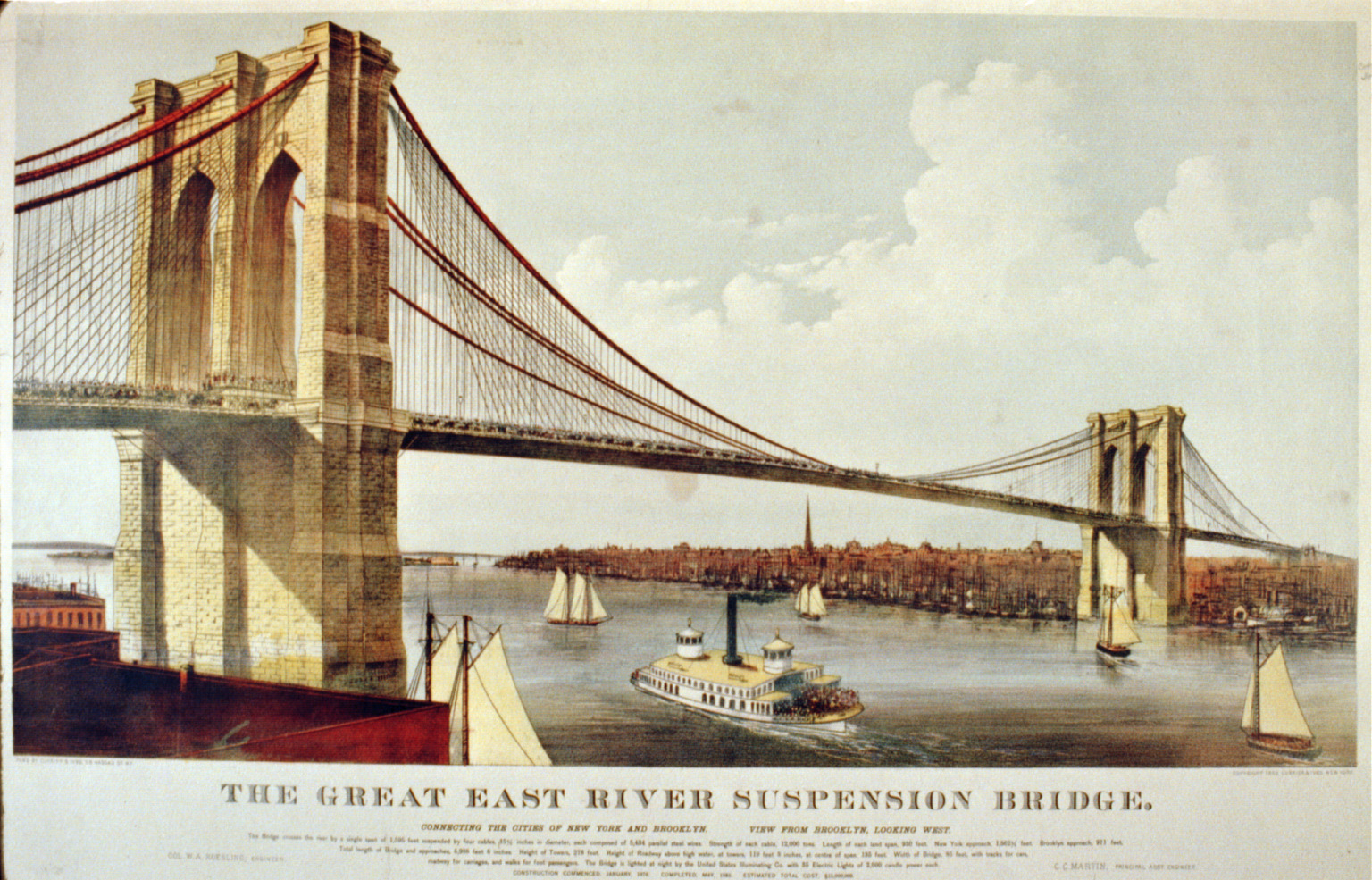
Brooklyn Bridge in 1877

Schroeder was a member of the New York State Senate (3rd D.) in 1880 and 1881. During his time in the senate, Schroeder was instrumental in the creation of a new city charter for Brooklyn. The new charter strengthened the position of the mayor and replaced the three-headed commissions which had presided over the city departments with single heads of departments. Schroeder also sponsored legislation limiting the amount of debt that municipalities could take on.

When his term as senator expired, Schroeder retired from politics. There were several attempts by the Republican party to nominate him again for the posts of mayor of Brooklyn, governor of New York and mayor of Greater New York after the consolidation. However, Schroeder declined to run again, even though in 1896, Seth Low offered to forgo his own candidacy for the Citizens Union, should Schroeder be prepared to run against Robert Anderson Van Wyck for mayor of New York. Van Wyck was the candidate of Tammany Hall, a political machine which played a role in New York politics that was similar to (and even more important than) that of the Brooklyn ring against which Schroeder had fought as mayor of Brooklyn.

The exact reasons for Schroeder's unwillingness to seek another political office are not known. However, according to Schroeder's own statement, his refusal to accept the republican nomination for the post of governor was due to the pro-prohibition stance of components of the Republican Party in the state, which Schroeder felt was driving away German-American voters.

== Death ==
Schroeder died in 1899 in New York. The cause of his death was pneumonia which he had contracted at the funeral of his daughter Mary Jane (born 1866). His wife (Mary Jane Schroeder, née Rusher, 1830–1913) who he had married in 1854, his son Edwin and five more daughters (Leonora Mary, born 1857, Harriet Louise, born 1861, wife of Schroeder's business partner Frank N. Arguimbau, Alice, born 1872 and Frances, born 1874) survived him. Schroeder was buried at Green-Wood Cemetery. Among his honorary pall-bearers were his former business associate Isidore M. Bon, brewer H. B. Scharmann, civil war veteran and Brooklyn Union Gas (now part of KeySpan Corporation) president James Jourdan, and former general and Secretary of the Navy Benjamin F. Tracy.

Schroeder's death was mourned even back in his native town of Trier.

== Notes ==
Political offices
Preceded by John W. Hunter	Mayor of Brooklyn; 1876 – 1877	Succeeded by James Howell
Preceded by John C. Jacobs	New York State Senate; 3rd District; 1880–1881	Succeeded by Charles H. Russell
