= Abiel Abbot Low =

American businessman (1811–1893)

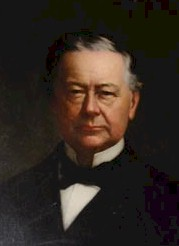
- Born: February 7, 1811; Salem, Massachusetts, US
- Died: January 7, 1893 (aged 81); Brooklyn, New York City, US
- Monuments: Low Memorial Library (Columbia U.); Hospital in Wu-Chang, China
- Other name: A. A. Low
- Occupations: Businessman, merchant active in the China trade in tea and also in the opium trade
- Known for: Clipper ship owner, philanthropist
- Board member of: President, New York Chamber of Commerce, 1846; board member, Packer Collegiate Institute; member, Union Defense Committee of New York, War Fund Committee of Brooklyn; President, General Committee of Citizens in Brooklyn; President, Chamber of Commerce, Long Island Historical Society endowment
- Spouses: Ellen Almira (m. 1841; died 1850); Anne Davison Low (m. 1850)
- Children: 4, including Abbot and Seth
- Relatives: Harriet Low (sister); William Henry Low (uncle); Mary Hillard Loines (niece)

Abiel Abbot Low (February 7, 1811 – January 7, 1893) was an American entrepreneur, businessman, and philanthropist who gained most of his fortune from the China trade, importing teas, porcelains, and silk, and building and operating a fleet of reputable clipper ships.

== Early life ==
Low was one of twelve children (eight sons, four daughters) of a Salem, Massachusetts, drug merchant, Seth Low, and Mary (née Porter) Low. His sister, Harriet Low, was one of the first young American women to live in China and is remembered for her journal of life in Macau from 1829 to 1833. Another brother, Charles Porter Low, served as captain on the Houqua, Jacob Bell, Samuel Russell, and N.B. Palmer.

His paternal grandparents were Hannah (née Haskell) Low and David Low (a son of David and Abigail (née Choate) Low).

Abiel grew up attending public schools; became a clerk in the house of Joseph Howard & Company, a company engaged in the South American trade, and moved to New York with his family in 1829. There, Seth Low's pharmaceutical business flourished, importing drugs and India goods.

== Career ==
=== China ===
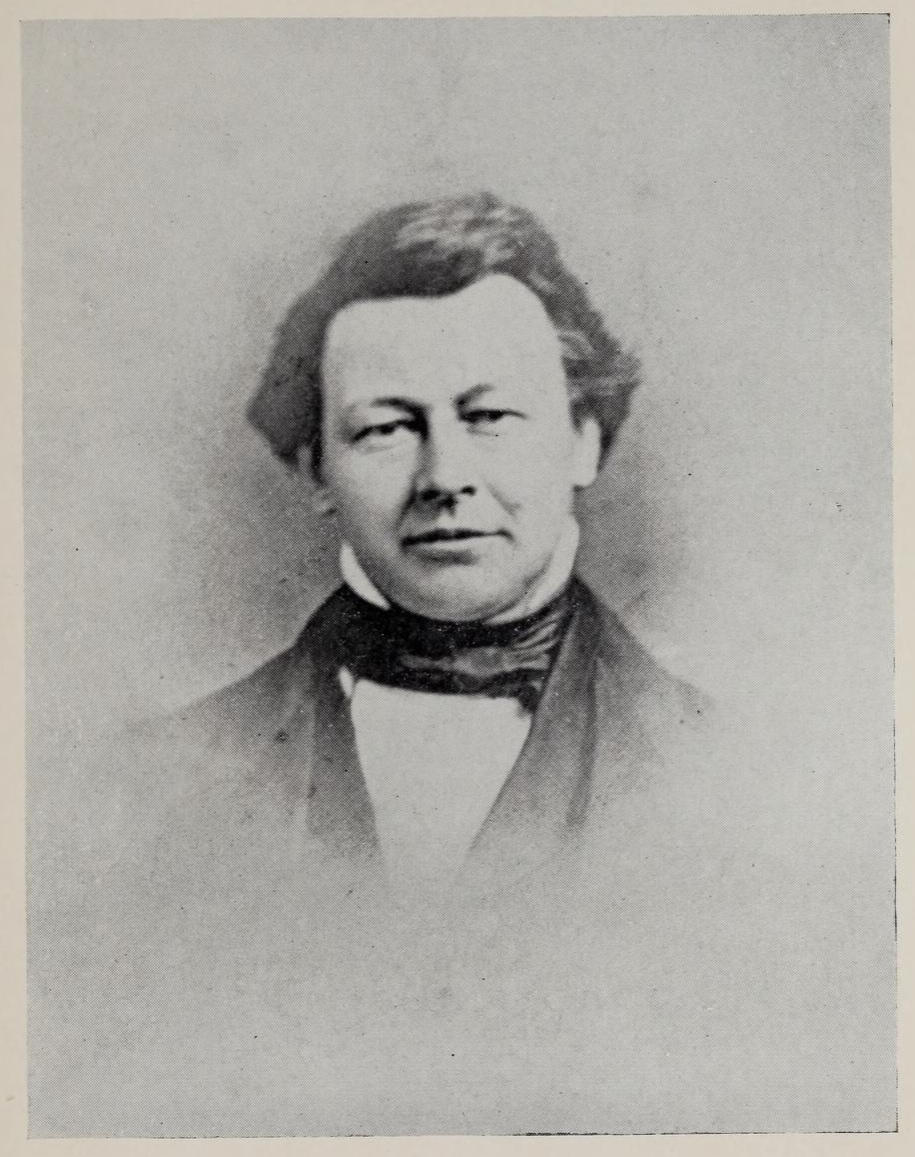
Abiel Abbot Low, circa 1846.

In 1833, Low sailed to Canton, China, and started working as a clerk for the mercantile house of Russell & Company, the largest American firm in China and also the country's leading American opium trading and smuggling enterprise. Founded by Samuel Russell, Low's uncle, William Henry Low, had been at its head for some years. In 1837, after four years of learning the intricacies of trading in China, Low became a partner in the firm. He launched his own business in 1840 in a joint venture with Wu Bingjian, also known as Howqua, a mentor for young Americans in China, a very important Hong merchant, head of the Canton Cohong and one of the richest men in China. The company, A. A. Low & Brother named for both him and his brother, Josiah Orne Low, rapidly became one of the leading China and Japan silks and teas trading company.

=== New York ===
Having made his fortune in China working with Russell & Co, and shortly after the launch of his business, Low returned to New York. There, he set up his New York headquarters on Fletcher Street, in a building shared with his father's business. In 1849–1850, Low erected the A. A. Low building at 167–171 John Street, now the offices of the South Street Seaport Museum. The firm was situated at its Burling Slip building from 1850 to after the turn of the century.

Low launched his own fleet of clippers, among which were the Houqua, the first streamlined ship, named after his Chinese business partner who had died in 1843, and the Samuel Russell, named after the founder of the mercantile company in which Low had worked as a clerk. Two other of Low's clippers, the Contest and the Jacob Bell, were subsequently destroyed by Confederate privateers during the Civil War.

Low was known for his business astuteness and shrewdness. He is said to have instructed his captains in China to wait and let competitors purchase the first tea pickings, and to purchase the following tea pickings at a lower price. Because of the speed of his clippers, he still managed to reach New York before his competitors.

=== Later life ===
Once firmly settled in New York, Low invested in other ventures, participating in the financing of the first Atlantic cable, of the Nickel Plate Railroad, of the Chesapeake and Ohio Railway through West Virginia together with Collis P. Huntington and others, and of Newport News, Virginia, and Huntington, West Virginia. Low was made a member of the New York chamber of commerce in 1846, and was elected as its president in 1863. He held the office until 1866 when he resigned and embarked on a voyage around the world. During his tenure, he spoke out on behalf of New York businessmen against British support to Confederate commerce destroyers.

Low never pursued an active political career, unlike his father, who had become mayor of the village of Brooklyn, or son, Seth Low, who later became the mayor of Greater New York. However, Low did accept nominations as a consultant and advisor to local trade and governmental authorities regarding trade and commercial interests. During the Civil War, he was active within the Union Defense Committee of New York, a member of the War Fund Committee of Brooklyn, and president of the General Committee of Citizens in Brooklyn, appointed in aid of the sanitary service.

He is also known for his philanthropy activities. In 1858, he became president of the Brooklyn Female Academy, later the Packer Collegiate Institute, and remained on the Packer board until his death in 1893. He was known to give bonuses to teachers and anonymous scholarships to deserving students. He also contributed to the development of the Brooklyn Library, the City hospital and many other cultural, educational, social and religious enterprises.

== Personal life ==
On March 16, 1841, Low married Ellen Almira, a daughter of wealthy dry goods importer and farmer Josiah Dow of Brooklyn, and Rebecca Marie (née Phippen) Dow. Before her death in 1850, they were the parents of two sons and two daughters:

- Harriette Low (1842–1884), who died unmarried at her father's cottage in Newport, Rhode Island.
- Abbot Augustus Low (1844–1912), an inventor (notably of the paper shredder), businessman and industrialist; he married Marian Ward, a daughter of George Cabot Ward, in 1877.
- Ellen Almira Low (1846–1884), who married Henry Evelyn Pierrepont, elder brother of John Jay Pierrepont, in 1869.
- Seth Low (1850–1916) who later became mayor of New York and president of Columbia University; he married Anne Wroe Scollay Curtis, a daughter of Supreme Court Justice, Benjamin Robbins Curtis.

Upon the death of his wife in 1850, Low married Anne (née Davison) Low, widow of Low's brother William Henry Low. She died in Newport in 1890 and her funeral was held at Grace Church, Brooklyn Heights.

He died in Brooklyn on January 7, 1893.

=== Legacy ===
The Low Memorial Library, administrative center of Columbia University, was built in his memory by his son, Seth, in 1895. In 1894, Low's sons Abbot Augustus and Seth, built a hospital in Wu-Chang, China in memory of their father.

== See also ==
- Kay Moor, a coal company town in West Virginia built for Low's Low Moor Iron Company, listed on the National Register of Historic Places.
- N.B. Palmer, A.A. Low & Brother clipper ship, which tied the record Shanghai-New York run of 89 days.
- Houqua, A.A. Low & Brother clipper ship, named in honor of Howqua
