= Seth Low =

American politician (1850–1916)

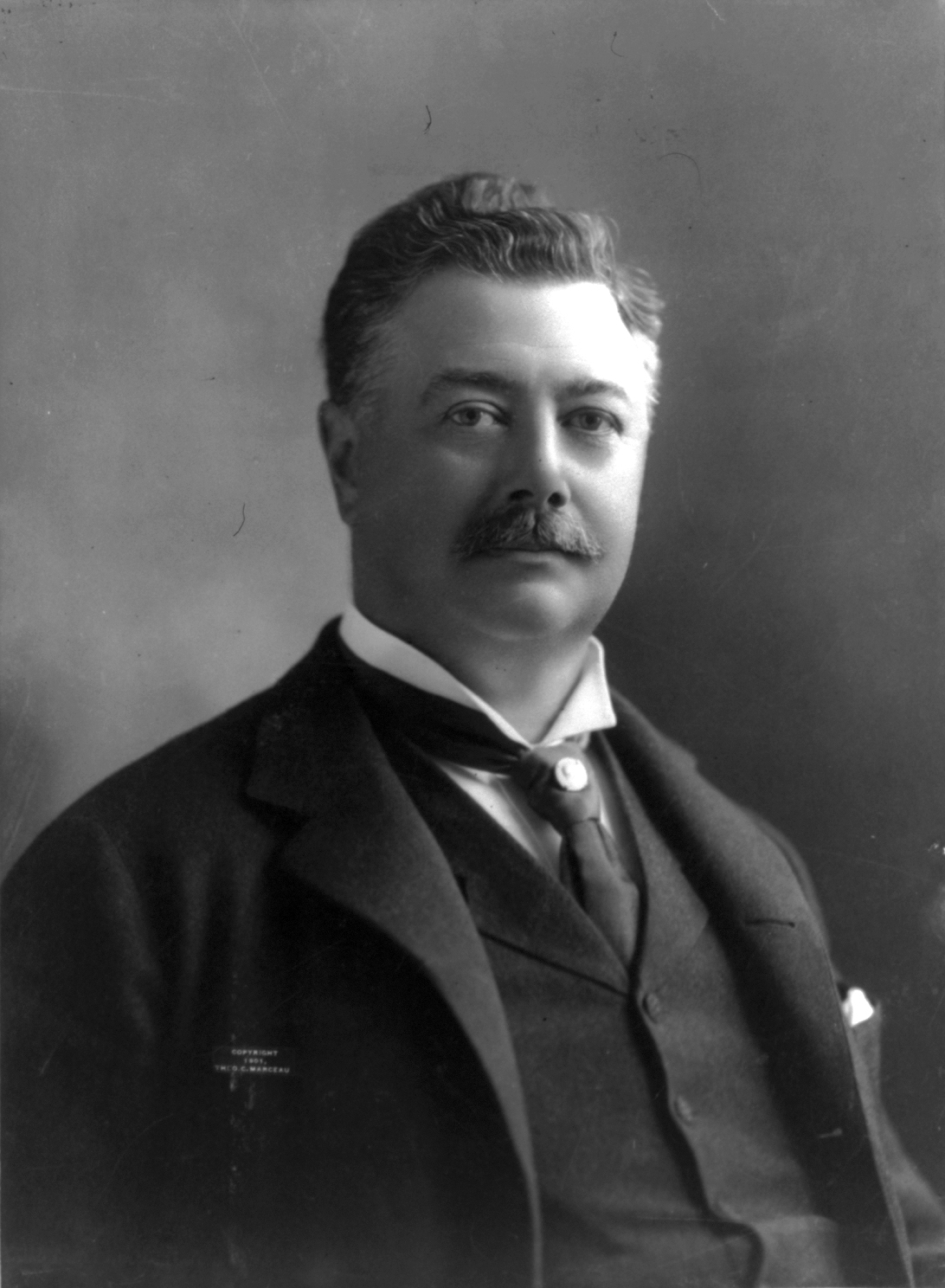
- Low in 1901

93rd Mayor of New York City
- In office January 1, 1902 – December 31, 1903
- Preceded by: Robert Anderson Van Wyck
- Succeeded by: George B. McClellan Jr.

11th President of Columbia University
- In office 1890–1901
- Preceded by: Frederick A. P. Barnard
- Succeeded by: Nicholas Murray Butler

23rd Mayor of Brooklyn
- In office January 1, 1881 – December 31, 1885
- Preceded by: James Howell
- Succeeded by: Daniel D. Whitney

Personal details
- Born: January 18, 1850 New York City, US
- Died: September 17, 1916 (aged 66) Bedford Hills, New York, US
- Party: Republican
- Spouse: Anne Wroe Scollay Curtis (m. 1880)
- Parent: Abiel Abbot Low (father)
- Relatives: Abbot Augustus Low (brother); Harriet Low (aunt)
- Education: Columbia College

Seth Low (January 18, 1850 – September 17, 1916) was an American public figure. He chronologically served as the 23rd mayor of Brooklyn from 1881 to 1885, the 11th president of Columbia University from 1890 to 1901, a diplomatic representative of the United States to the International Peace Conference at The Hague in 1899, and the 93rd mayor of New York City from 1902 to 1903. He was a leading municipal reformer fighting for efficiency during the Progressive Era.

== Early life ==
Low was the son of Abiel Abbot Low and Ellen Almira Dow. Low's father was a leading trader in China, and his father's sister, Harriet Low, was one of the first young American women to live in China. The Low family was old Puritan New England stock, descended from Thomas Low of Essex County, Massachusetts. Low was named after his grandfather Seth Low (1782–1853) who moved with his son Abiel to Brooklyn to start a prosperous importing company. When Brooklyn was incorporated as a city in 1834, Seth the elder was one of the incorporators; he also served on the Board of Aldermen and was first President of the Board of Education. Seth the elder was also involved with charity and support work for the poor; on his deathbed, he admonished his three-year-old grandson and namesake: "Be kind to the poor."

Low's father was a Unitarian, and his mother was an Episcopalian. For years, Low wavered between the two faiths. Finally, at age 22, Low decided he would henceforth be an Episcopalian.

Low attended Poly Prep Country Day School in Brooklyn and Columbia College. After graduating from Columbia in 1870, Low made a short trip abroad, and then entered the tea and silk house of A. A. Low & Brothers, which had been founded by his father in New York. In 1875, he was admitted a member of the firm, from which, upon its liquidation in 1888, he withdrew with a large fortune.

== Advocating cuts to welfare ==
In the mid-1870s, Low began to lay the groundwork for his political career by supporting "welfare reform" - in particular, the elimination of food and coal disbursements for the poor, which caused "starving people" to gather at "warehouses where food was stored" to beg for help. During this period, the reform movement, of which Low was a stalwart, denounced emergency assistance of potatoes and flour for the poor. The reduction in welfare assistance for the poor led many to seek shelter in "police station basements" and in city hospitals, and led many poor parents to bring "their children to asylums" and many men to beg on the streets for "charity or work."

On December 9, 1880, Low married Anne Wroe Scollay Curtis of Boston, daughter of Justice Benjamin R. Curtis of the United States Supreme Court. They had no biological children, but adopted two nieces and a nephew.

== Mayor of Brooklyn ==
=== First term ===
By 1881, Brooklyn had been governed for years by a corrupt Democratic political machine under Hugh McLaughlin. By this time, a wave of goo-goo (or "good government") sentiment had begun to gain favor, and public sentiment was starting to turn against the incumbent Democratic regime.

Brooklyn Republicans sensed an opportunity, but they were split between the "stalwart" candidate Benjamin F. Tracy and reform candidate Ripley Ropes. Low had no particular ambition to become mayor, but his name was brought forth as a compromise, because his wealth and old family name appealed to the "stalwarts" and his reformist views appealed to the reformers. He accepted the nomination at the Republican city convention, stating that he would not be a partisan mayor. He defeated the incumbent Democrat James Howell after a two-week campaign, 45,434 votes to 40,937.

Low's time in office was marked by a number of reforms:

- Low's major achievement as mayor was to secure a degree of "home rule" of the city. Previously, the State Government dictated city policies, hiring, salaries, and other affairs. He also managed to secure an unofficial veto over all Brooklyn bills in the State Assembly.
- Low instituted a number of educational reforms. He was the first to integrate Brooklyn schools. He introduced free textbooks for all students, not just those who had taken a pauper's oath. He instituted a competitive examination for hiring teachers, instead of giving teaching jobs to pay political debts. He set aside $430,000 for the construction of new schools to accommodate 10,000 new students.
- Low introduced Civil Service Code to all city employees, eliminating patronage jobs.
- German immigrants wanted to enjoy their local beer gardens on the Sabbath, in violation of state "dry" laws and the demands of local puritanical clergy. His compromise solution was that saloons could stay open as long as they were orderly. At the first sign of rowdiness, they would be closed.
- Low served as a member of the board of the New York Bridge Company, the company that built the Brooklyn Bridge, and led an unsuccessful effort to remove Washington Roebling as the chief engineer on that project.
- Low raised the tax rate from $2.33 of $100 assessed valuation in 1881 to $2.59 in 1883. He also went after property owners who had not paid back taxes. This increase in city revenue enabled him to reduce the city's debt and increase services. However, raising taxes proved extremely unpopular.

=== Second term ===
Low's tax increases and non-partisan governing policy lost him a measure of public support. By 1883, fellow Republicans were criticizing him openly, and the press was critical of his tax policy. Although the Democrats ran the weak, nearly unknown candidate Joseph C. Hendrix in 1883, Low beat him by a slimmer margin than his first election. While he had won his first term by 5,000 votes, he squeaked by for re-election with only a 1,548-vote margin.

In 1884, Low's mugwump support of Democrat Grover Cleveland in 1884 furthered the rift with his fellow Republicans. He declined to run for a third term in 1885, and refused to support Republican nominee General Isaac S. Catlin. Instead, he supported a reform candidate, General John B. Woodward. By this time, the public was losing their attraction to reform, and Democrat Daniel D. Whitney won election. With Whitney came the return of Democratic machine politics for another seven years. By 1892, some writers were looking back on Low's tenure as a "Golden Age" of clean government.

== President of Columbia University ==
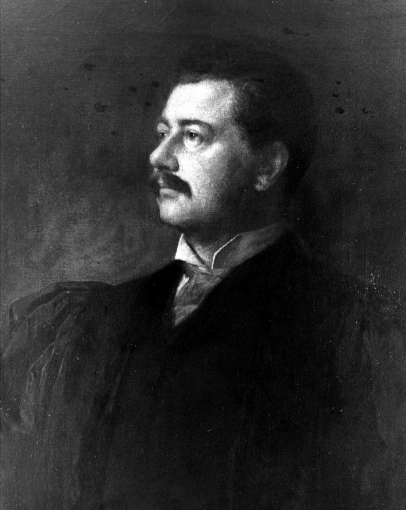
Eastman Johnson's portrait of Seth Low, c. 1890

Following his tenure as mayor of Brooklyn, Low assumed the presidency of Columbia College, serving between 1890 and 1901. While not himself an educator, he succeeded by his administrative skill in transforming the institution. He led the move of the institution from Midtown Manhattan to Morningside Heights, and secured trustee approval to change its name to "Columbia University". The new campus matched his vision of a civic university fully integrated into the city; the original design subsequently reconceived, left it open to the street and surrounding neighborhoods.

To forge a university, Low united the various schools into one organization whose direction was moved from the separate faculties to a university council. Further reforms he effected included the reorganization of the law school, the addition of a faculty of pure science, the association of the university with the Teachers College, and the extension of the department of political and social study. In 1895, he gave one million dollars of his inheritance from his father for Low Memorial Library to be built at the new Columbia University campus. It was dedicated to his father and opened in 1897.

During his time at Columbia, Low was elected to the American Philosophical Society.

== International Peace Conference ==
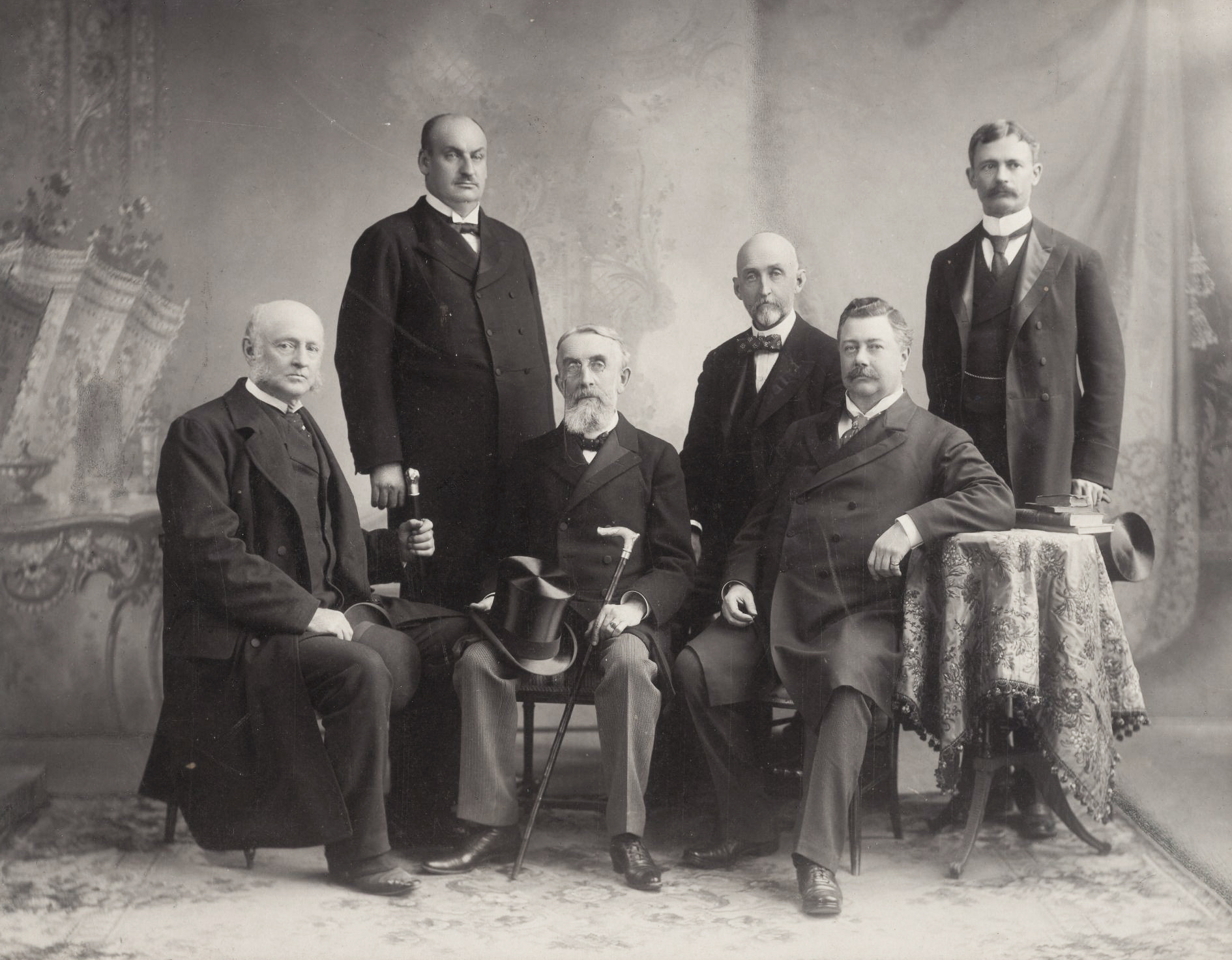
Low (seated at right) with other members of the American delegation to the International Peace Conference, 1899

On July 4, 1899, Low was one of the American delegates to attend the International Peace Conference at The Hague. Others in the delegation were Andrew D. White, then the United States Ambassador to the German Empire; Stanford Newel of Minnesota, then the United States Minister to the Netherlands; Captain Alfred Mahan, of the United States Navy; Captain William Crozier, of the United States Army; and Frederick Holls of New York.

At the conference, Low made the concluding speech, printed two months later in The New York Times, saying:

On this day, so full for Americans of thoughts connected with their National Independence, we may not forget that Americans have yet other grounds for gratitude to the people of the Netherlands. We cannot forget that our flag received its first foreign salute from a Dutch officer, nor that the Province of Friesland gave to our independence its first formal recognition. By way of Leyden and Delft-Haven and Plymouth Rock, and again by way of New Amsterdam, the free public school reached American shores. The United States of America have taken their name from the United States of the Netherlands. We have learned from you only that 'in union there is strength'; that is an old lesson, but also, in large measure, how to make 'One out of many'. From you we have learned what we, at least, value, to separate Church and State; and from you, we gather inspiration at all times in our devotion to learning, to religious liberty, and to individual and National freedom. These are some of the things for which we believe the American people owe no little gratitude to the Dutch; and these are the things for which today, speaking in the name of the American people, we venture to express their heartfelt thanks.

== Mayor of New York City ==
Low's first campaign for mayor of consolidated New York in 1897 was unsuccessful, partially because of a division among anti-Tammany Hall candidates and parties.

During Low's 1901 mayoral campaign, he had the support of humorist Mark Twain. He and Twain made a joint appearance that drew a crowd of more than 2,000.

In 1902, Low resigned as president of Columbia University to become the second mayor of the newly consolidated City of New York, and the 93nd overall. He was the first mayor of Greater New York to be elected on a fusion ticket, with the support of both the Citizens Union and Republican parties. Some of his achievements include the introduction of a civil service system based on merit for hiring municipal employees, reducing widespread graft within the police department, improving the system of education within the city, and lowering taxes. Despite these achievements, he only served for two years, and was defeated in 1903 by Democrat George B. McClellan Jr.

== Later life ==
Low was chairman of Tuskegee University (formerly Tuskegee Institute), a historically black college directed under Booker T. Washington, from 1907 until 1916. From 1907, he was also president of the business-labor alliance the National Civic Federation. Though he believed in collective bargaining rights, which had customarily been denied to labor unions by those in authority, favored arbitration over strikes as a suitable labor-management negotiation tactic. He was a founder and the first president of the Bureau of Charities of Brooklyn, and was elected vice-president of the New York Academy of Sciences and president of the Archaeological Institute of America.

Low became interested in the problem of the food supply's contribution to the constantly increasing cost of living. He became convinced that this difficulty could best be solved by democratic cooperation among farmers and consumers. He was president of the Bedford Farmers' Cooperative Association. He was also one of the founders of the Cooperative Wholesale Corporation of New York City, an organization which seeks to bring about a business federation of all the consumers' cooperative store societies in the eastern United States. However, not being in sympathy with the radical tendency of this phase of the cooperative movement, he eventually resigned and devoted himself entirely to the agricultural phase of cooperation. He was also a trustee of the Carnegie Institute of Washington, D.C.

In the spring of 1916, Low became ill with cancer. He died in his home in Bedford Hills, New York, on September 17, 1916. His funeral demonstrated his ability to reach political consensus, with honorary pallbearers including both financier and philanthropist J. P. Morgan Jr. and labor activist and AFL founder Samuel Gompers. He is buried in Green-Wood Cemetery in Brooklyn, New York.

== Legacy ==
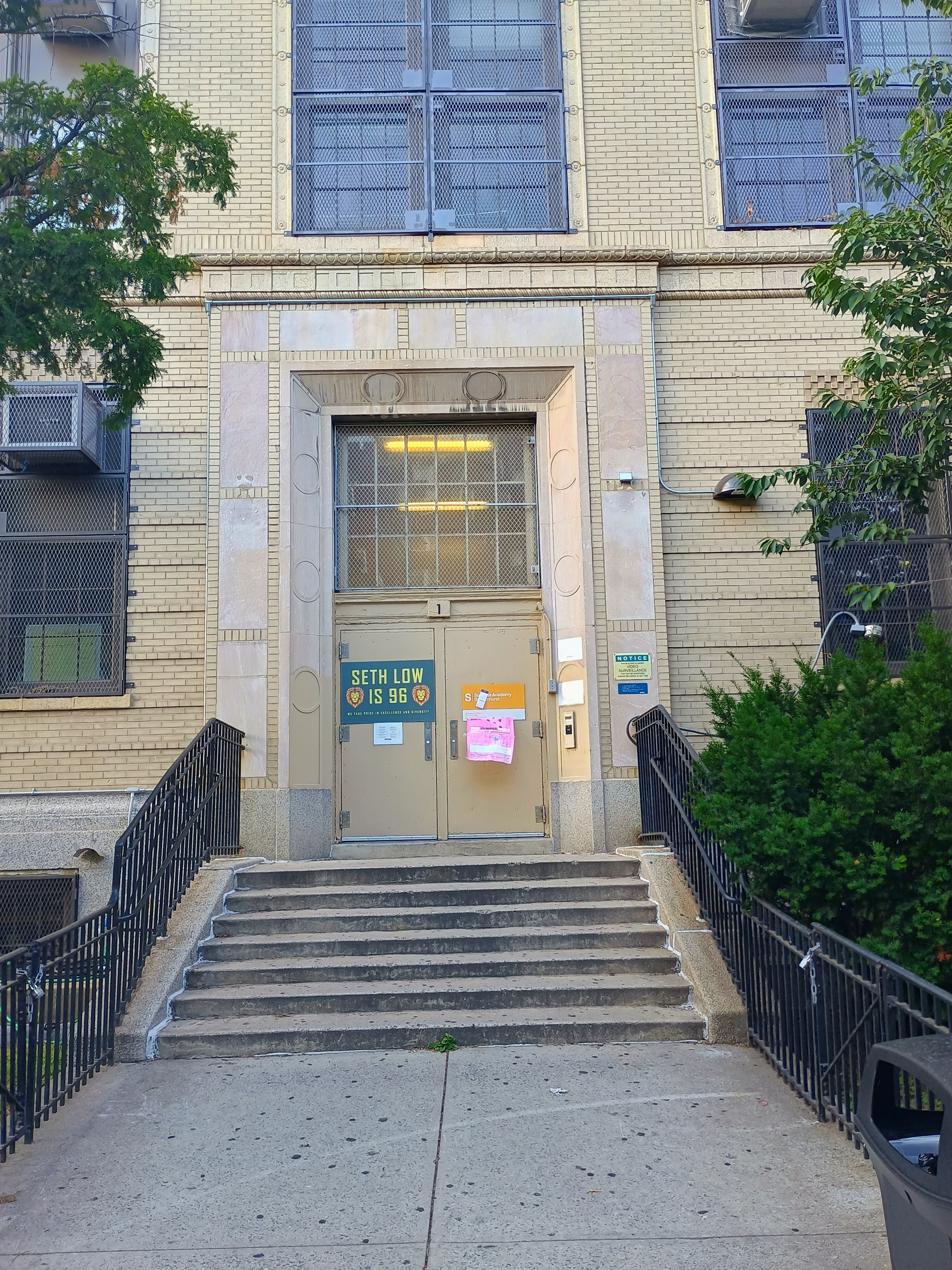
Entrance of Seth Low Intermediate School 96 in Brooklyn

A school in the Bensonhurst neighborhood of Brooklyn is named Seth Low Intermediate School 96. A playground on the next block was known for many years as Seth Low Playground to locals, before the name was officially given in 1987.

In Seth Low Pierrepont State Park Reserve, named after Low's nephew, there is a street named after Low called Seth Low Mountain Road.

In the Brownsville section of Brooklyn, New York, there is a NYCHA public housing development named Seth Low Houses. It consists of four 17 and 18 story buildings.

The Brooklyn Fire Department operated a fireboat named Seth Low from 1885 to 1917.

There was a Seth Low Junior College at Columbia University between 1928 and 1936.

== See also ==
- List of mayors of New York City

Academic offices
Preceded by Frederick A. P. Barnard	President of Columbia University; 1890–1901	Succeeded by Nicholas Murray Butler
Political offices
Preceded by James Howell	Mayor of Brooklyn; 1882–1885	Succeeded by Daniel D. Whitney
Preceded by Robert A. Van Wyck	Mayor of New York City; 1902-01-01 – 1903-12-31	Succeeded by George B. McClellan Jr.
