= Juliana Westray =

American actress

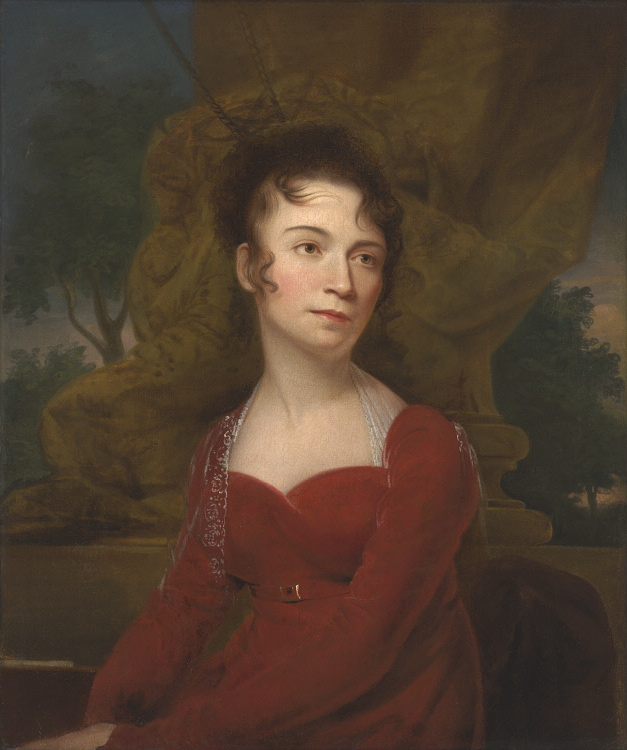
Juliana Westray, Rembrandt Peale 1811

Juliana Westray (c. 1778–1838) was an American stage actress.

Juliana Westray was born in England. She was the sister of the actress Ellen Westray, and married the theatre manager William Burke Wood. She was engaged at the Haymarket Theatre, Boston in 1797, in the Old American Company at the Park Theatre in New York in 1798–1803, at the Chestnut Street Theatre (1809–1820), the Walnut Street Theatre (1820–1826) and the Arch Street Theatre in Philadelphia. She was described as one of the more well known stage actors of her time and was, in her time, one of the star attractions of her generation of the Philadelphia stage.
