= The Canton Register =

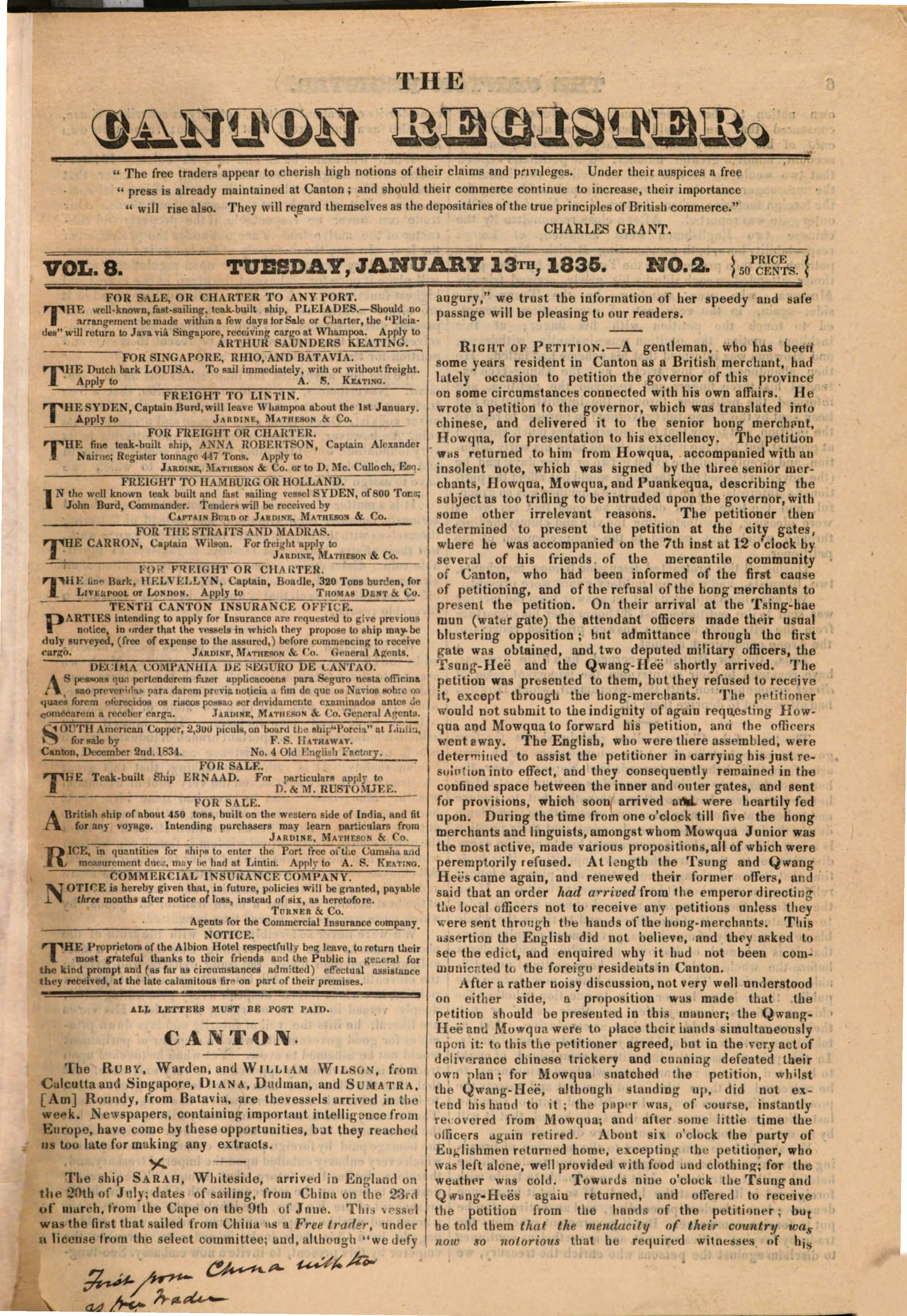
Cover of volume 8, release 2 of The Canton Register

The Canton Register was an English-language newspaper founded by Scottish merchants James Matheson and his nephew Alexander together with Philadelphian William Wightman Wood, the first editor. First published in Canton on 8 November 1827 and printed every two weeks, it was one of China's first English-language newspapers. Over the years, the publication was renamed The Hongkong Register and changed ownership shortly before ceasing operation in the late 1850s.
