= Hugh McLaughlin (politician) =

American politician

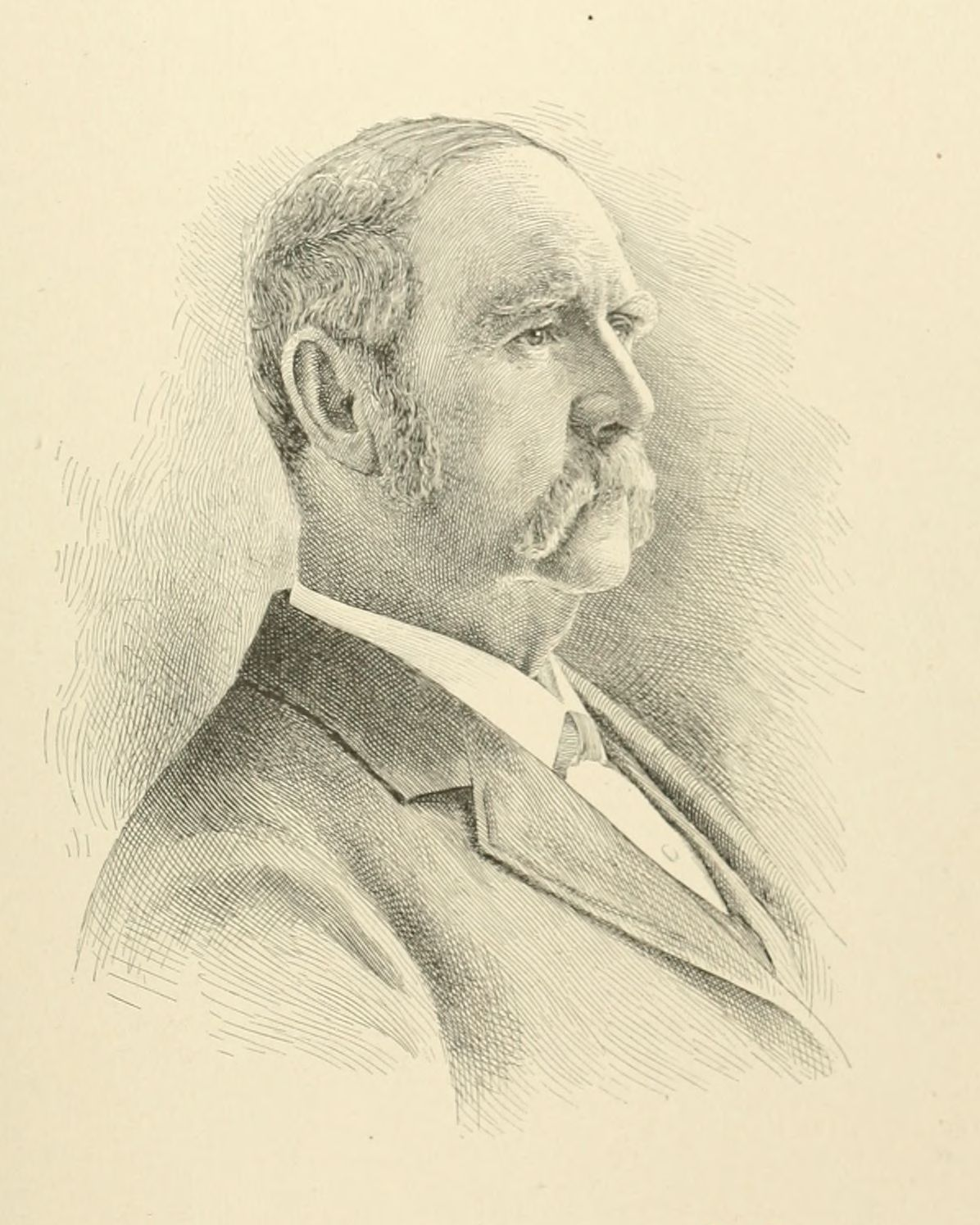

Kings County Recorder of Deeds
- In office 1861–1873

Personal details
- Born: April 2, 1827 Brooklyn, New York, U.S.
- Died: December 7, 1904 (aged 77) Brooklyn, New York City, U.S.
- Resting place: Holy Cross Cemetery
- Party: Democratic

Hugh McLaughlin (April 2, 1827 – December 7, 1904) was an American politician and for many years the "boss" of the Democratic Party in Brooklyn.

== Life ==
Hugh McLaughlin was born in Brooklyn as son of Irish immigrants. He learned the trade of a rope maker. In 1855 he became master mechanic in the Brooklyn Navy Yard. That position put a great deal of patronage at his disposal which he used to build support for the Democratic Party. In spite of his growing influence, McLaughlin's candidacy for sheriff of Kings County failed in 1860. In 1861, however, was elected to the office of Kings County Register of Deeds, a function which he kept for three consecutive terms. More important than his public offices was McLaughlin's position within the Brooklyn Democratic party: In 1862 he became the boss of the Brooklyn political machine known as the "Brooklyn ring". As such, he dominated local politics for many years, despite the efforts of reform-oriented mayors like Frederick A. Schroeder and Seth Low to roll back the influence of the Brooklyn ring. McLaughlin was thus able to play an important role in the creation of Prospect Park and the building of Brooklyn Bridge. However, after the merger of Brooklyn and New York City in 1898, McLaughlin's ring came into conflict with the political machine of Tammany Hall in New York. McLaughlin lost and was forced to retire from politics in 1903. He was succeeded as Brooklyn's political boss by Patrick J. McCarren who forced McLaughlin from power. McLaughlin died from a heart attack at his home on December 7, 1904. His funeral was held on December 10 and he was buried at Holy Cross Cemetery in Brooklyn, New York.
