= Abbot Augustus Low =

American inventor

Abbot Augustus Low (Gus Low) (1844–1912) was an entrepreneur and inventor from Brooklyn, who lived in St. Lawrence County, New York and was the owner of the Horseshoe Forestry Company. He was the son of Abiel Abbot Low and owned 32,000 acres (130 km^{2}) in an area of upstate New York known as Horseshoe, located on the Western shore of Horseshoe Lake, in Piercefield, New York and extending onto bordering land in Colton, New York.

Low was an inventor and held various patents, such as a means of preserving maple sugar, a motor, an exhaust system, an igniter, and a bottle. Low filed a patent application in 1909 for a "waste-paper receptacle" that is believed to have been the first paper shredder. It received the U.S. patent number 929,960 on August 31, 1909, but was never manufactured. When Low died, the only inventor with more patents registered than him was Thomas Edison.

Low's property around Lows Lake, also known as the Bog River Flow, included a narrow gauge railroad, a blacksmith shop, an energy generating plant, a stable, an engine house, storehouses, maple sugaring buildings, employee housing and boathouses. Low developed the property with two dams to produce electricity and aid annual log drivings. It is now part of the Bog River Management Unit in Adirondack Park. Low's business enterprises included spring water production, maple syrup, wild berry preserve and wood products.

Abbot Low and his brother Seth Low, president of Columbia University, and later mayor of New York City, built a hospital in Wu-Chang, China in memory of their father, Abiel Abbot Low, a "successful" merchant in Canton.

== Legacy ==
Lows Lake, a man-made lake created by Low with two dams (built in 1903 and 1907), is named after Low.
