= William B. Wood (actor) =

American actor and theatre manager (1779–1861)

William Burke Wood
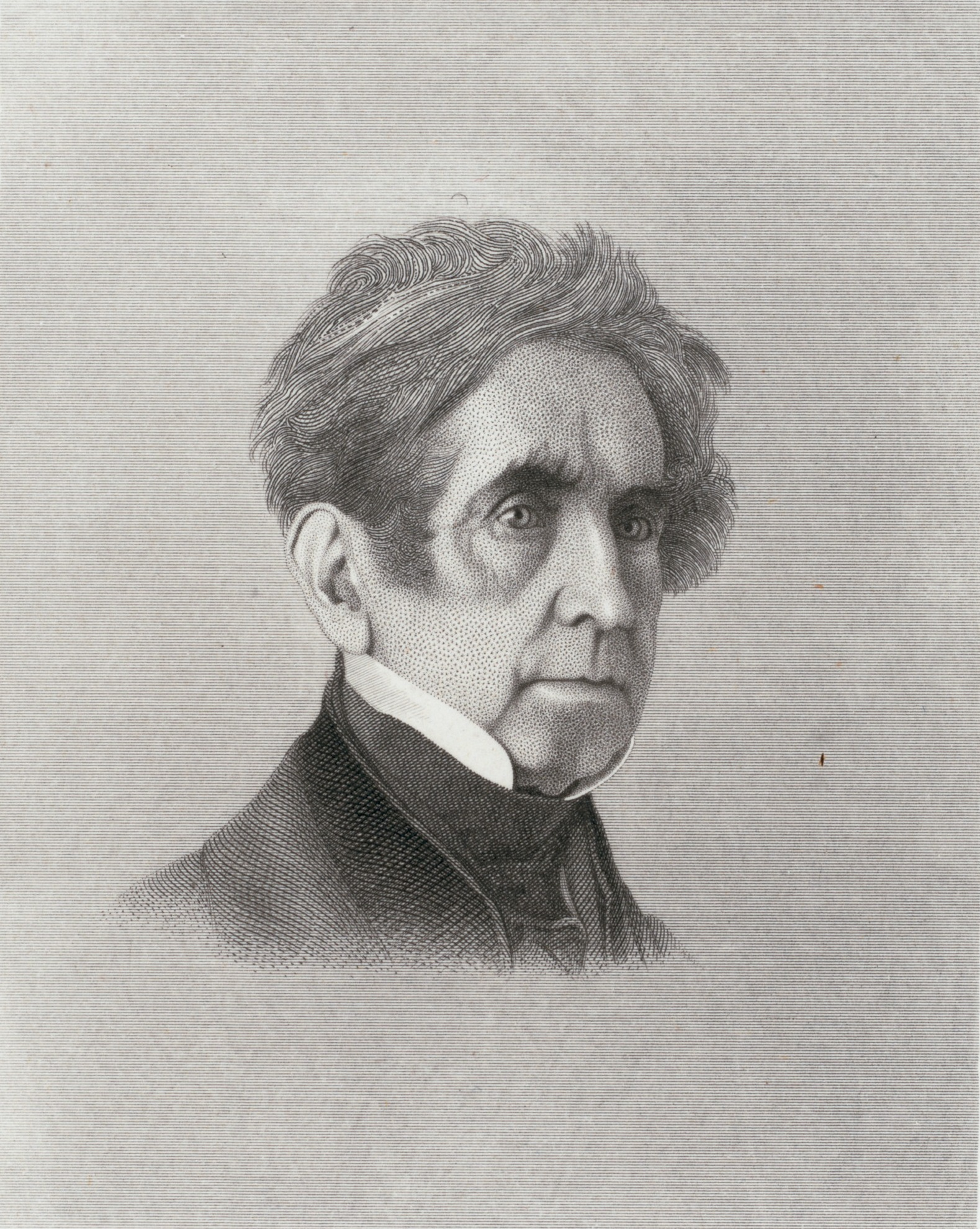
- Born: May 26, 1779; Montreal, Quebec, Canada
- Died: September 23, 1861 (aged 82); Philadelphia, Pennsylvania, U.S.
- Resting place: Laurel Hill Cemetery, Philadelphia, Pennsylvania, U.S.
- Spouse: Juliana Westray
- Children: William Wightman Wood

William Burke Wood (May 26, 1779 - September 23, 1861) was an American actor and theatre manager. He was the first actor born in North America to achieve notable success in the theatre. He co-managed several theatres in Baltimore, Philadelphia and Washington, D.C., with William Warren from 1809 to 1826. He managed the Arch Street Theatre in 1828 and the Walnut Street Theatre in Philadelphia from 1829 to 1846. He published his Personal Recollections of the Stage in 1855.

== Early life ==
He was born on May 25, 1779, in Montreal, Quebec, Canada, to English parents. His parents emigrated to Canada before the American Revolutionary War but returned to New York City with Wood circa 1784. He worked as a clerk.

== Career ==
He moved to Annapolis, Maryland, at age 19 and joined Thomas Wignell's company. He made his first appearance there on 26 June 1798 as George Barnwell in The London Merchant. He had some moderate success, and began an engagement the same year in Philadelphia in Secrets Worth Knowing.

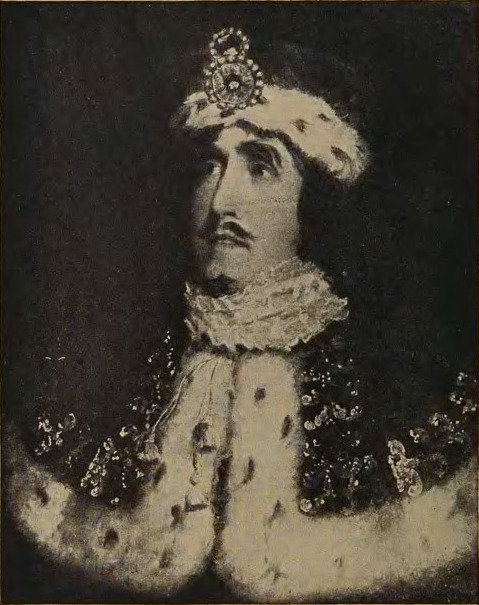
Painting of Wood as King John by John Neagle

He continued to act and took on roles in New York City. He had less success in tragedy roles and found his niche in comedy. He received accolades for his performance of de Valmont in The Foundling of the Forest. He was the first North American born actor to have notable success in the theatre.

In the autumn of 1809, Wood purchased from William Warren one half of his interest in Philadelphia, Baltimore, and Washington theatres. In the autumn of 1810, he began his career as manager in Baltimore, Maryland, and from September 1812 till the close of the season of 1820, he divided his time between Baltimore and Philadelphia, where his company played at the Chestnut Street Theatre. On 2 April 1820, the theatre was destroyed by fire, and, as the insurance had expired a few days before, the loss was heavy. Having secured a lease of the Walnut Street Theatre, the Warren-Wood company began to play again in Philadelphia the following November. The Chestnut Street Theatre was rebuilt, it was opened by Warren and Wood on 2 December 1822 with The School for Scandal and Wood portraying Charles Surface.

In 1826, Wood sold his share of the theatres back to Warren. On 1 October 1828, Wood undertook the management of the newly built Arch Street Theatre in Philadelphia, however the enterprise was not successful and only lasted one year. He managed the Walnut Street Theatre in Philadelphia from 1829 to 1846. For the remainder of his career, he divided his time between management and acting in Philadelphia. He retired from the stage, 18 November 1846, on the occasion of a benefit at the Walnut Street Theatre. He published his reminiscences of his career, with much information regarding the American stage, in his Personal Recollections of the Stage in 1855. He died in Philadelphia on September 23, 1861, and was interred at Laurel Hill Cemetery, Section L, Plot 129.

== Personal life ==
On 30 January 1804, he married Juliana Westray, a British-born actress. She had joined the company in which Wood was playing, and after her marriage continued to act in the theatres that he managed. The couple had a son, William Wightman Wood, who became a journalist and author based in Macau and Canton, China.

== Publications ==
- Personal Recollections of the Stage, Philadelphia: Henry Carey Baird, 1855
