= William Henry Low =

American merchant

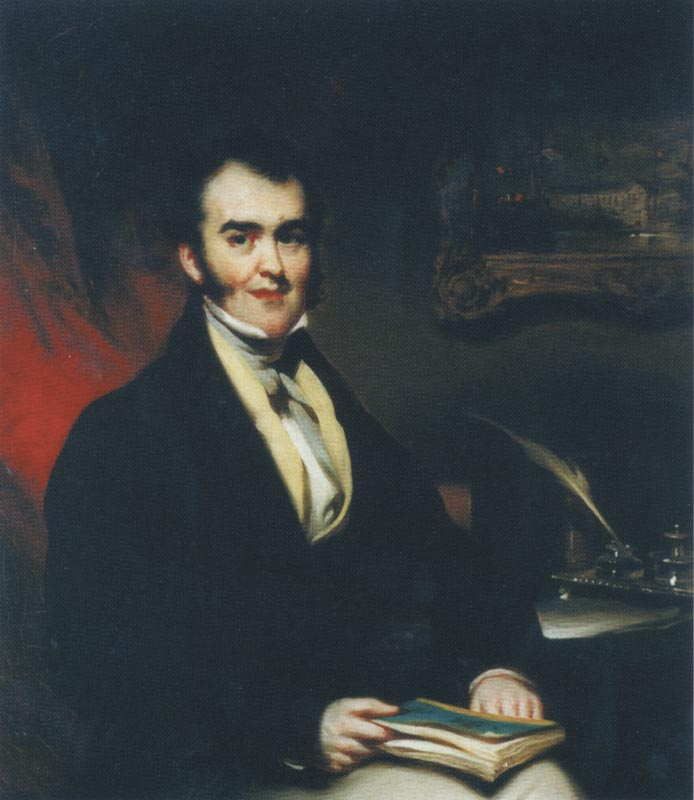
William Henry Low

William Henry Low (1795 – March 22, 1834) was an American entrepreneur, businessman, and trader from Salem, Massachusetts, who was one of the American pioneers of the Old China Trade. In 1828, having settled in Canton, China, Low was admitted as a partner of the Russell & Co. trading company, as a replacement chosen by founding partner Philip Ammidon. Senior partner of the firm, he retired in 1833 after having recruited his nephew, Abiel Abbot Low, and died in the Cape of Good Hope the following year; while returning home in the company of his wife and niece, the diarist Harriet Low
