= Goo-goos =

Term used to refer to believers in "good government"

The goo-goos, or good government guys, were political groups working in the early 20th century to reform urban municipal governments in the United States that were dominated by graft and corruption. Goo-goos supported candidates who would fight for political reform. The term was first used in the 1890s by their detractors.

In New York City, the exclusive City Club of New York was the domain of "goo-goos," who sponsored "Good Government Clubs" in every assembly district. Their efforts led to the election of a reform mayor in 1894, a setback for the political machine known as Tammany Hall.

Members of several political reform movements in the late 19th and early 20th centuries were often labeled as goo-goos, including the Mugwumps and the Progressives. While old political labels like mugwump and progressive have been reinvented several times, and have shifted in meaning as a result, the term goo-goo still has political currency, and has changed little since it was first used in the late 19th century.

In American politics, the term is still used occasionally as a mildly derisive label for high-minded citizens or reformers. Mike Royko, a Chicago political columnist of the late 20th century, revived the word without reinventing it. Royko was a critic and astute observer of Chicago politics. When Royko wrote about the "goo-goos" along Lake Shore Drive, he may even have agreed with them, but Slats Grobnik, his fictional Chicagoan, was very cynical about them.

== In popular culture ==
- In the eighth episode of the TV series Boss, season 2 ("Consequence"), Alderman William Ross tells Mayor Thomas Kane that Ross can deliver goo-goos' votes (along with those of other voters he controls), in exchange for Kane's giving Ross leeway to appoint four ward bosses.
- In Of Mice and Men by John Steinbeck, in telling George about his preferred "parlour", Whit observes that in addition to clean girls, and comfortable chairs, the proprietress (Susy), "Don't let no goo-goos in, neither."

== See also ==
- Good governance
