= Guild of Saint Luke =

City guild for painters and other artists in early modern Europe

- Sint-Lucasgilde
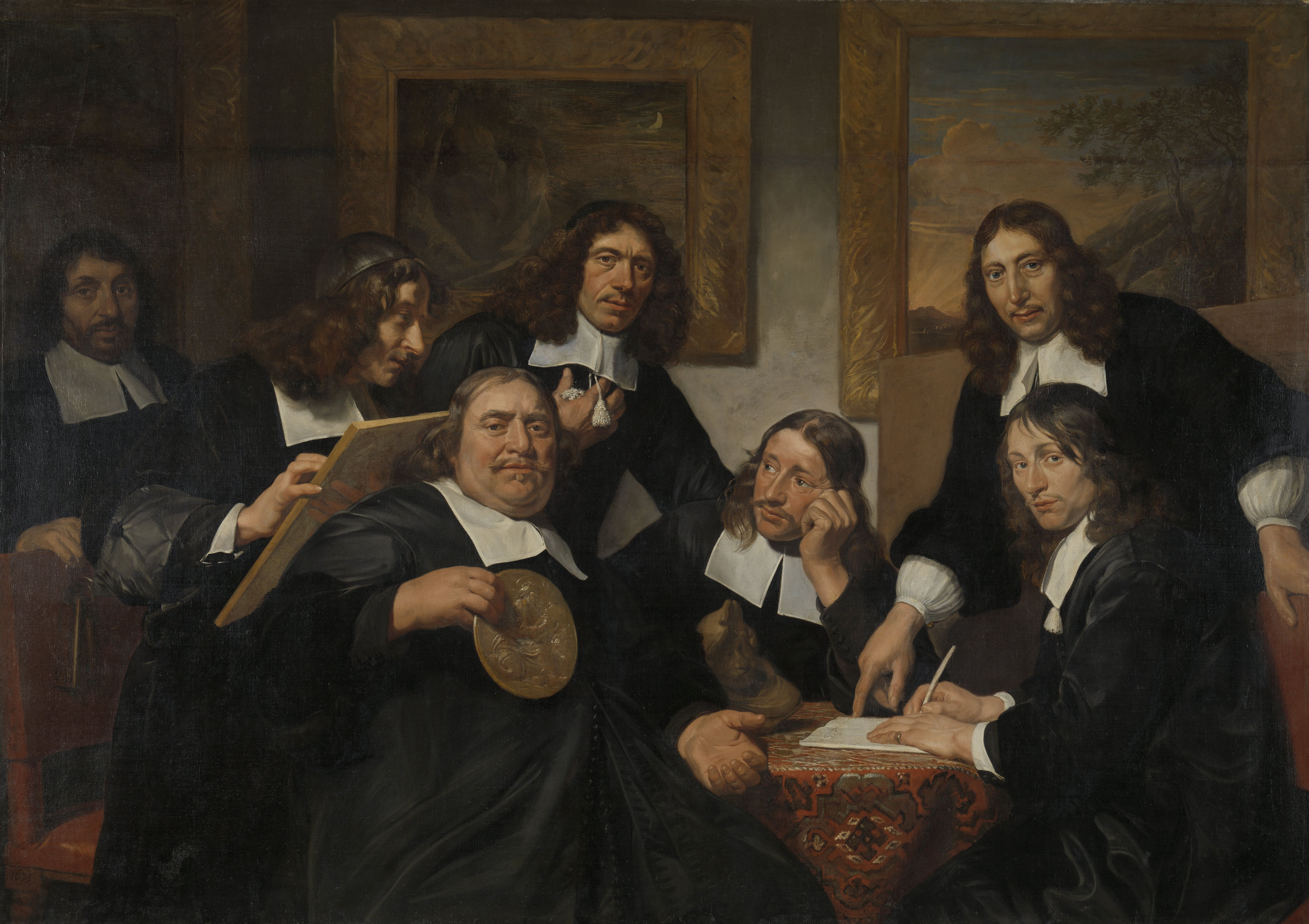
- The Governors of the Haarlem Guild of St. Luke in 1675. Jan de Bray painted himself second from the left. Surprisingly, fewer such group portraits exist of painters than for other Guild occupations.
- Founded: 14th century
- Founded at: Low Countries
- Type: Guild
- Location: early modern Europe, especially in the Low Countries
- Fields: painters and other artists

The Guild of Saint Luke was the most common name for a city guild for painters and other artists in early modern Europe, especially in the Low Countries. They were named in honour of the Evangelist Luke, the patron saint of artists, who was identified by John of Damascus as having painted the Virgin's portrait.

One of the most famous such organisations was founded in Antwerp. It continued to function until 1795, although by then it had lost its monopoly and therefore most of its power. In most cities, including Antwerp, the local government had given the Guild the power to regulate defined types of trade within the city. Guild membership, as a master, was therefore required for an artist to take on apprentices or to sell paintings to the public. Similar rules existed in Delft, where only members could sell paintings in their city or have a shop. The early guilds in Antwerp and Bruges, setting a model that would be followed in other cities, even had their own showroom market stall from which members could sell their paintings directly to the public.

The guild of Saint Luke not only represented painters, sculptors, and other visual artists, but also—especially in the seventeenth century—dealers, amateurs, and even art lovers (the so-called liefhebbers). In the medieval period most members in most places were probably manuscript illuminators, where these were in the same guild as painters on wood and cloth—in many cities they were joined with the scribes or "scriveners". In traditional guild structures, house-painters and decorators were often in the same guild. However, as artists formed under their own specific guild of St. Luke, particularly in the Netherlands, distinctions were increasingly made. In general, guilds also made judgments on disputes between artists and other artists or their clients. In such ways, it controlled the economic career of an artist working in a specific city, while in different cities they were wholly independent and often competitive against each other.

== Antwerp ==
Although it did not become a major artistic centre until the sixteenth century, Antwerp was one of the first cities, if not the first, to found a guild of Saint Luke. It is first mentioned in 1382, and was given special privileges by the city in 1442. The registers, or Liggeren, from the guild exist, cataloging when artists became masters, who the dean for each year was, what their specialities were, and the names of any students. In Bruges, however, which was the dominant city for artistic production in the Low Countries in the fifteenth century, the earliest known list of guild members dates to 1453, although the guild was certainly older than this. There all artists had to belong to the guild in order to practice in their own names or to sell their works, and the guild was very strict about which artistic activities could be practiced–distinctly forbidding an artisan to work in an area where another guild's members, such as tapestry weaving, were represented.

== Bruges ==
The Bruges guild, in a typically idiosyncratic medieval arrangement, also included the saddlemakers, probably because most members were painting illuminated manuscripts on vellum, and were therefore grouped as a sort of leatherworker. Perhaps because of this link, for a period they had a rule that all miniatures needed a tiny mark to identify the artist, which was registered with the Guild. Only under special privileges, such as court artist, could an artist effectively practice their craft without holding membership in the guild. Peter Paul Rubens had a similar situation in the seventeenth century, when he obtained special permission from the Archdukes Albert VII and Isabella to be both court artist in Brussels and an active member of the Guild of Saint Luke in Antwerp. Membership also allowed members to sell works at the guild-owned showroom. Antwerp, for example, opened a market stall for selling paintings in front of the cathedral in 1460, and Bruges followed in 1482.

== Dutch Republic ==
Guilds of St. Luke in the Dutch Republic began to reinvent themselves as cities there changed over to Protestant rule, and there were dramatic movements in population. Many St. Luke guilds reissued charters to protect the interests of local painters from the influx of southern talent from places like Antwerp and Bruges. Many cities in the young republic became more important artistic centres in the late sixteenth and early seventeenth centuries. Amsterdam was the first city to reissue a St. Luke's charter after the reformation in 1579, and it included painters, sculptors, engravers, and other trades dealing specifically in the visual arts. When trade between the Spanish Netherlands and the Dutch Republic resumed with the Twelve Years' Truce in 1609, immigration increased and many Dutch cities reissued guild charters as a form of protection against the great number of paintings that began to cross the border.

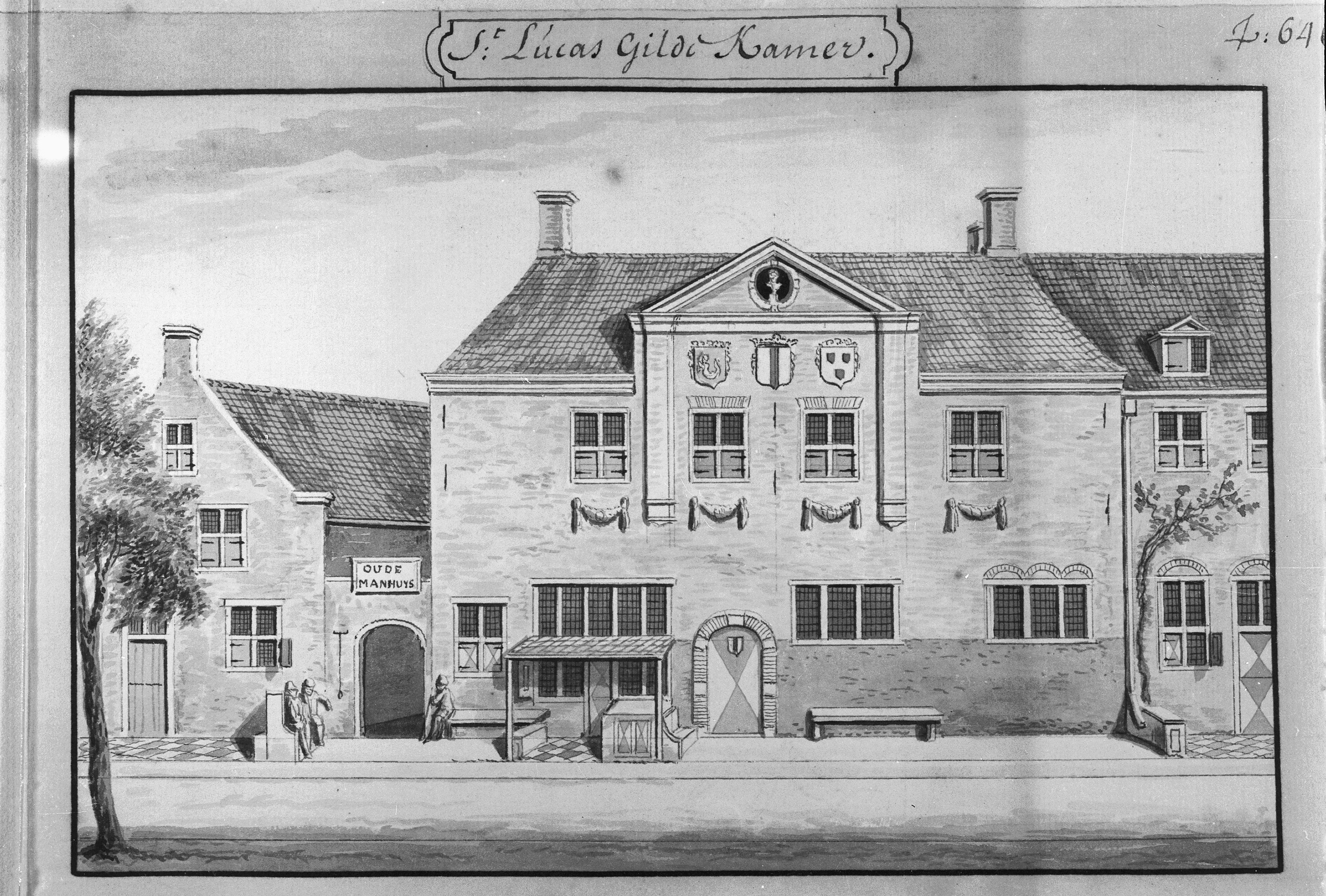
1730s engraving of the Delft Guild of St. Luke, by Abraham Rademaker. Today the location of the Vermeer Centre

For example, Gouda, Rotterdam, and Delft, all founded guilds between 1609 and 1611. In each of those cases, panel painters removed themselves from their traditional guild structure that included other painters, such as those who worked in fresco and on houses, in favour of a specific "Guild of St. Luke". On the other hand, these distinctions did not take effect at that time in Amsterdam or Haarlem. In the Haarlem Guild of St. Luke, however, a strict hierarchy was attempted in 1631 with panel painters at the top, though this hierarchy was eventually rejected. In the Utrecht guild, also founded in 1611, the break was with the saddlemakers, but in 1644 a further split created a new painters' guild, leaving the guild of Saint Luke with only the sculptors and woodcarvers. A similar move in The Hague in 1656 led to the painters leaving the Guild of Saint Luke to establish a new Confrerie Pictura with all other kinds of visual artists, leaving the guild to the house-painters.

Artists in other cities were not successful in setting up their own guilds of St. Luke, and remained part of the existing guild structure (or lack thereof). For example, an attempt was made in Leiden to set up a guild in 1610 specifically for painters to protect themselves against the sale of art from foreigners, especially those from areas of Brabant and the area around Antwerp. However, the town, which traditionally resisted guilds in general, only offered to help them from illegal imports. Not until 1648 was a loosely organised "quasi-guild" permitted in that city. The Guilds of the small but wealthy seat of government The Hague and its near neighbour, Delft, were constantly battling to stop the other's artists encroaching into their city, often without success. By the later part of the century a kind of balance was achieved, with The Hague's portraitists supplying both cities, whilst Delft's genre painters did the same.

== Italy ==
In Renaissance Florence the Guild of St. Luke, per se, did not exist. Painters belonged to the guild of the Doctors and Apothecaries ("Arte dei Medici e Speziali") as they bought their pigments from the apothecaries, while sculptors were members of the Masters of Stone and Wood ("Maestri di Pietra e Legname). They were also frequently members in the confraternity of St. Luke (Compagnia di San Luca)—which had been founded as early as 1349—although it was a separate entity from the guild system. There were similar confraternal organisations in other parts of Italy, such as Rome. By the 16th century a guild had even been established in Candia in Crete, then a Venetian possession, by the very successful Greek artists of the Cretan School. In the sixteenth century, the Compagnia di San Luca began to meet at SS. Annunziata, and sculptors, who had previously been members of a confraternity dedicated to St. Paul (Compagnia di San Paolo), also joined. This form of the compagnia developed into the Florentine Accademia del Disegno in 1563, which was then formally incorporated into the city's guild system in 1572. The Florence example, in fact, eventually acted more like a traditional guild structure than the Accademia di San Luca in Rome.

Founded by Federico Zuccari in 1593, Rome's Accademia reflects more clearly the "modern" notions of an artistic academy rather than perpetuating what has often been seen as the medieval nature of the guild system. Gradually other cities were to follow the example of Rome and the Carracci in Bologna, with leading painters founding an "Academy", not always initially in direct competition with the local Guilds, but tending to eclipse and supplant it in time. This shift in artistic representation is generally associated with the modern conception of the visual arts as a liberal rather than mechanical art, and occurred in cities across Europe. In Antwerp David Teniers the Younger was both a dean of the Guild and founded the Royal Academy, while in Venice Pittoni and Tiepolo led a breakaway Accademia from the old Fraglia dei Pittori as the local guild was known. The new academies began to offer training in drawing and the early stages of painting to students, and artistic theory, including the hierarchy of genres, increased in importance.

== Guilds and intellectual pursuits ==
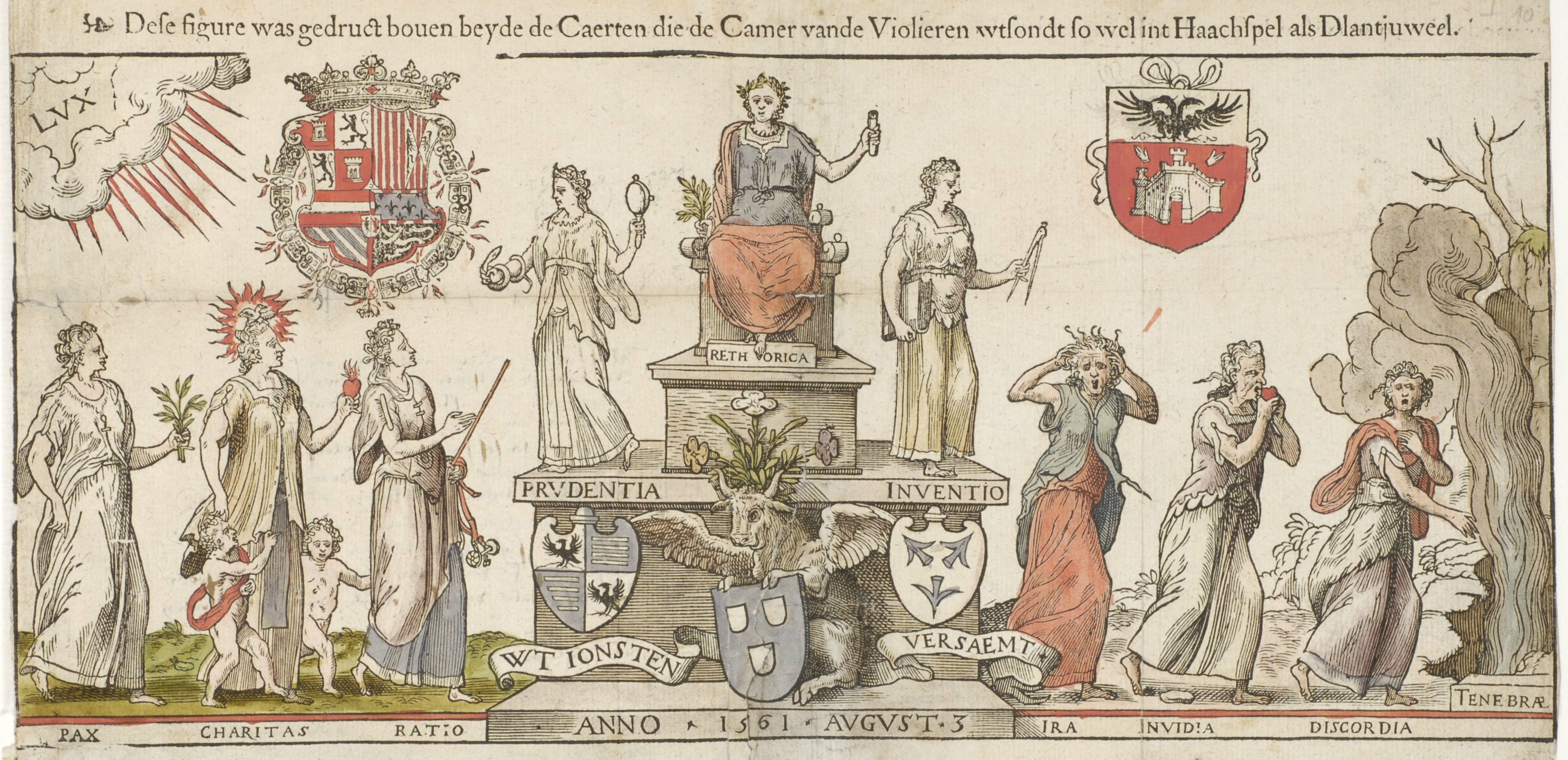
Printed invitation to other chambers of rhetoric by the Antwerp Violieren, for a landjuweel event, lasting 19 days, in 1561

The late sixteenth-century elevation of artist's status that occurred in Italy was echoed in the Low Countries by increased participation by artists in literary and humanistic societies. The Antwerp Guild of St. Luke, in particular, was closely associated with one of the city's eminent chambers of rhetoric, the Violieren, and, in fact, the two were often discussed as being the same. By the mid-sixteenth century, when Pieter Bruegel the Elder was active in the city, most of the members of the Violieren, including Frans Floris, Cornelis Floris, and Hieronymus Cock, were artists. The relationship between the two organisations, one for professionals practicing a trade and the other a literary and dramatist group, continued into the seventeenth century until the two groups formally merged in 1663 when the Antwerp Academy was founded a century after its Roman counterpart. Similar relationships between the Guild of St. Luke and chambers of rhetoric appear to have existed in Dutch cities in the seventeenth century. Haarlem's "Liefde boven al" ("Love above all") is a prime example, to which Frans Hals, Esaias van de Velde, and Adriaen Brouwer all belonged. These activities also manifested themselves in groups that developed outside of the guild like Antwerp's Romanists, for whom travel to Italy and appreciation of classical and humanist culture were essential.

== Guild rules ==
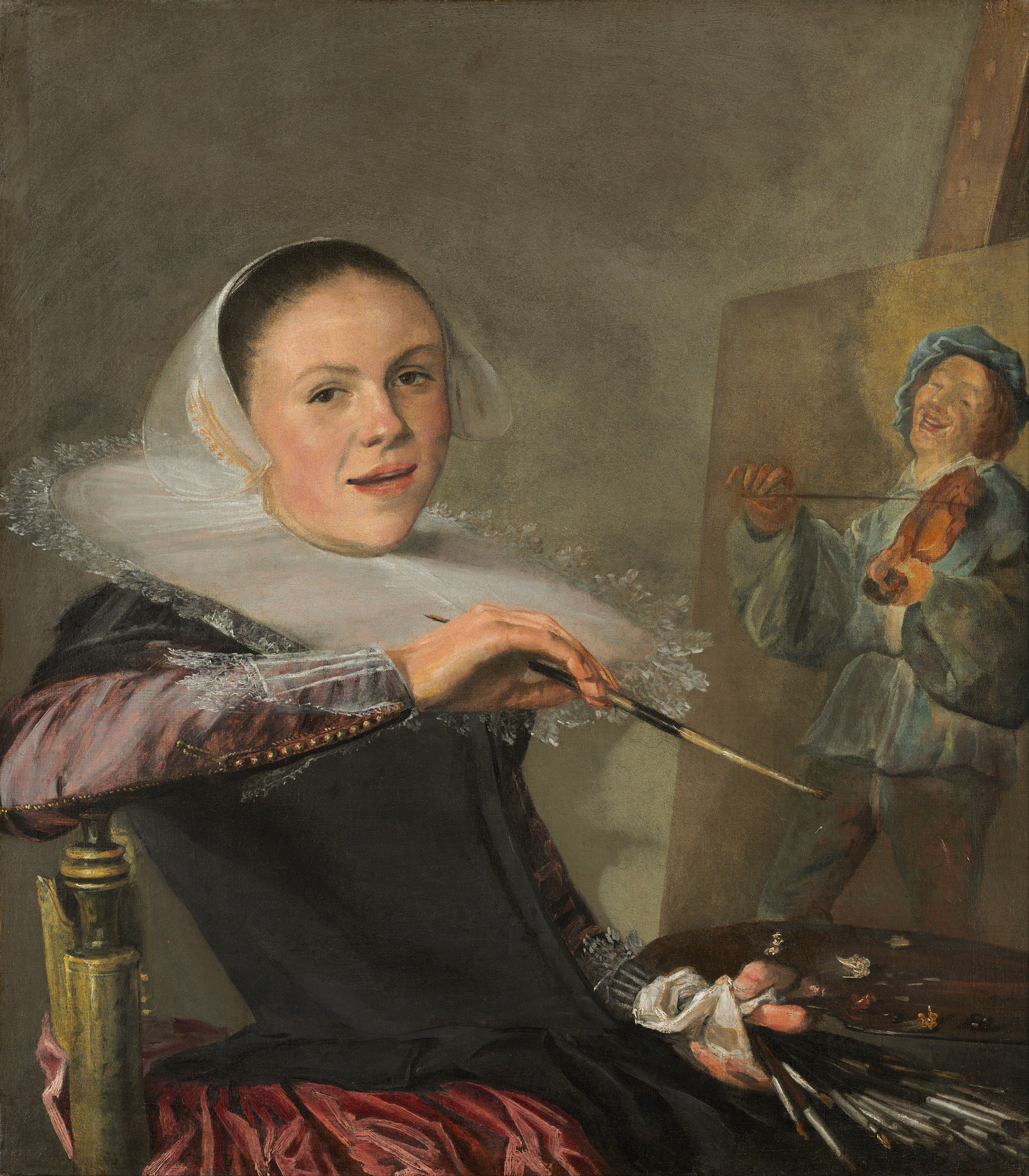
Judith Leyster self-portrait at 20, three years before she became the second woman to join the Haarlem Guild in 1633

Guild rules varied greatly. In common with the Guilds for other trades, there would be an initial apprenticeship of at least three, more often five years. Typically, the apprentice would then qualify as a "journeyman", free to work for any Guild member. Some artists began to sign and date paintings a year or two before they reached the next stage, which often involved a payment to the Guild, and was to become a "free Master". After this the artist could sell his own works, set up his own workshop with apprentices of his own, and also sell the work of other artists. Anthony van Dyck achieved this at eighteen, but in the twenties would be more typical.

In some places the maximum number of apprentices was specified (as for example two), especially in the earlier periods, and alternatively a minimum of one might be specified. In Nuremberg painting, unlike say goldsmithing, was a "free trade" without a Guild and regulated directly by the city council; this was intended to encourage growth in a city where much art was becoming linked with book publishing, for which Nuremberg was the largest German centre. Nonetheless, there were rules and for example only married men could operate a workshop. In most cities the women who were important members of workshops making illuminated manuscripts were excluded from the Guild or from being masters; however not in Antwerp, where Caterina van Hemessen and others were members. As the Christian title of the Guild suggested, Jews were excluded, at least from becoming masters, in most cities.

When printmaking arrived, many engravers were from a goldsmithing background and stayed in that guild. As that link weakened with the development of printmaking, some painters' guilds accepted engravers or etchers who did not paint as Members, and others did not. In London painters on glass had their own separate guild with the glaziers; elsewhere they would be accepted by the painters.

The rules of the Delft guild have been much puzzled over by art historians seeking to illuminate the undocumented training of Vermeer. When he joined the Guild there in 1653, he must have received six years training, according to the local rules. In addition, he had to pay a six guilders admission fee, despite the fact that his father was a Guild member (as an art dealer), which would normally have meant only a three guilder fee. This appears to mean that his training had not been received in Delft itself. Pieter de Hooch on the other hand, as an immigrant to Delft, had to pay twelve guilders in 1655, which he could not afford to pay all at once.

Another aspect of the Guild rules is illustrated by the dispute between Frans Hals and Judith Leyster in Haarlem. Leyster was the second woman in Haarlem to join the Guild, and probably trained with Hals – she was a witness at the baptism of his daughter. Some years later, in 1635, she brought a dispute to the Guild complaining that one of her three apprentices had left her workshop after only a few days, and had been accepted into Hals' shop, in breach of Guild rules. The Guild had the power to fine members, and after discovering that the apprentice had not been registered with them, fined both artists, and made a ruling on the apprentice's position.

== Decline of the guilds ==
All guild local monopolies came under general economic disapproval from the 17th century onwards; in the particular case of painters there was in many places a tension between the Guilds and artists imported as court painter by a ruler. When Anthony van Dyck was finally enticed to come to England by King Charles I, he was provided with a house at Blackfriars, then just outside the boundary of the City of London to avoid the monopoly of the London guild. The Hague with its Catholic court, split itself in two in 1656 with the Confrerie Pictura. By that time it was clear to all involved that the one-stop-shop concept of a guild was past its prime, and to ensure high quality and high prices, the education of artists needed to be separated from sales venues. Many towns set up academy style schools for education, while sales could be generated from arranged viewings at local inns, estate sales, or open markets. In Antwerp the Habsburg Governors eventually removed the Guild's monopoly, and by the end of the 18th century hardly any guild monopolies survived, even before Napoleon disbanded all guilds in territories he controlled. Guilds survived as societies or charitable organisations, or merged with the newer "Academies" – as happened in Antwerp, but not in London or Paris. Guild monopoly had a brief 20th century revival in Eastern Europe under Communism, where non-members of the official artist's union or guild found it very hard to work as painters – for example the Czech Josef Váchal.

== Paintings for the guilds ==
In many cities the Guild of Saint Luke financed a chapel that was decorated with an altarpiece of their patron saint. Rogier van der Weyden's Saint Luke Drawing the Virgin, c. 1435-1440 (Museum of Fine Arts, Boston), one of the earliest-known paintings, set up a tradition that was followed by many subsequent artists. Jan Gossaert's work (Kunsthistorisches Museum, Vienna) revisits Van der Weyden's composition while presenting the scene as a visionary experience instead of a directly witnessed portrait sitting. Later, Frans Floris (1556), Marten de Vos (1602) and Otto van Veen all represented the subject for the guild in Antwerp, and Abraham Janssens painted an altarpiece for the guild in Mechelen in 1605. These paintings are frequently self-portraits with the artist as Luke, and often provide insight into artistic practices from the time when they were made since the subject is of an artist at work.

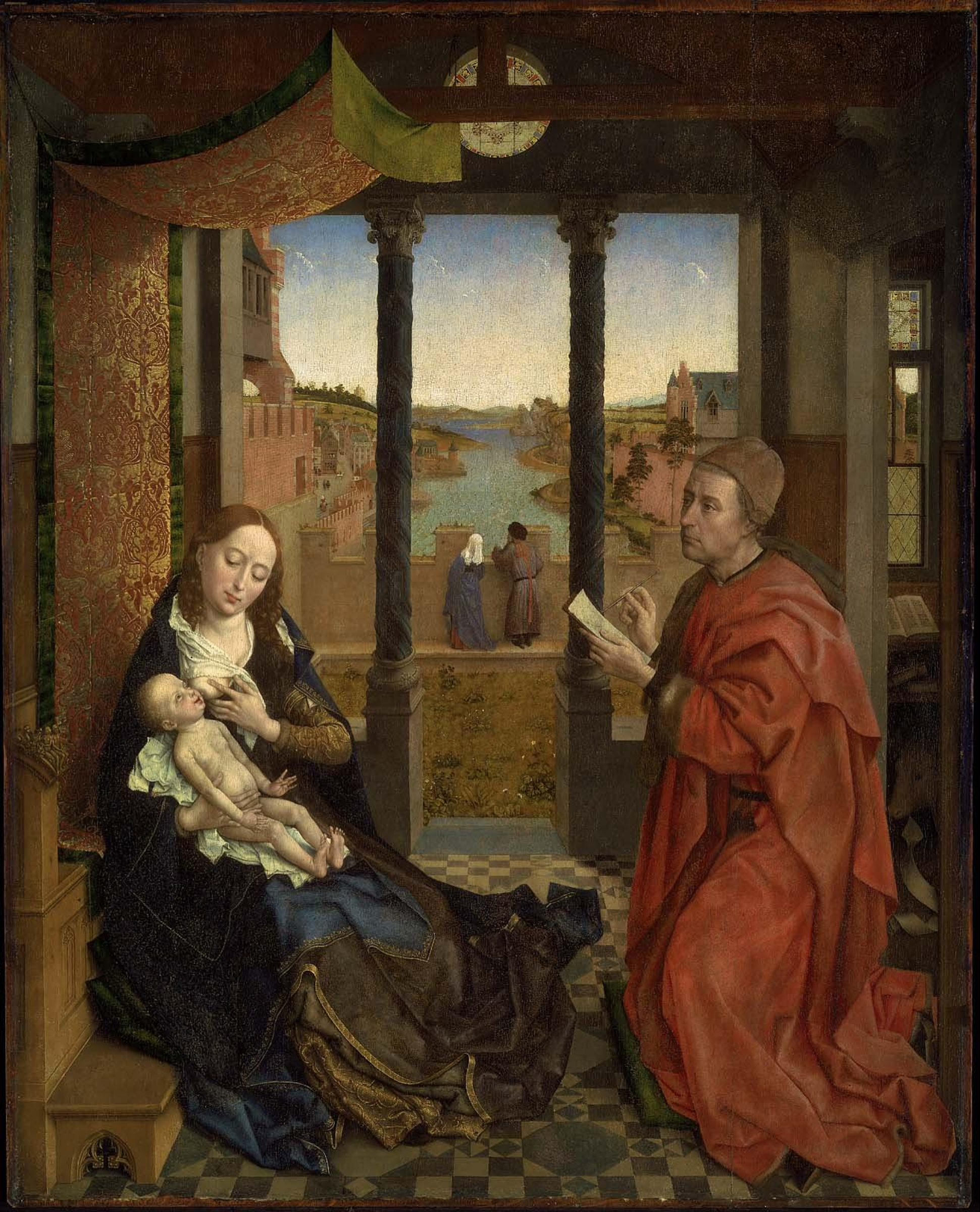
Saint Luke Drawing the Virgin, c. 1435–1440. 137.5 x 110.8cm. Museum of Fine Arts, Boston. This was the classic subject for paintings given to the guilds.

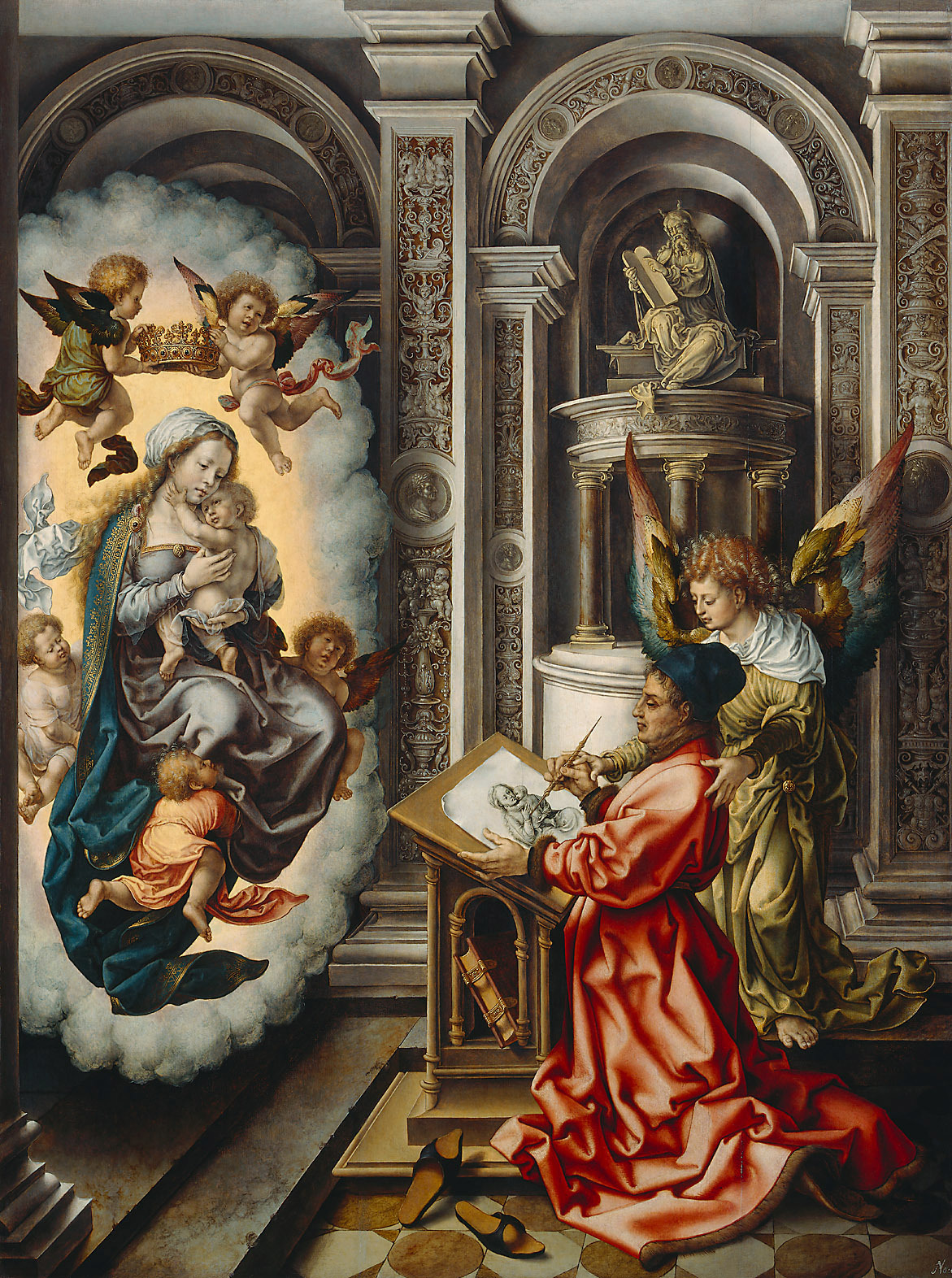
Jan Gossaert, St. Luke Painting the Madonna (c. 1520–1525), Kunsthistorisches Museum, Vienna.

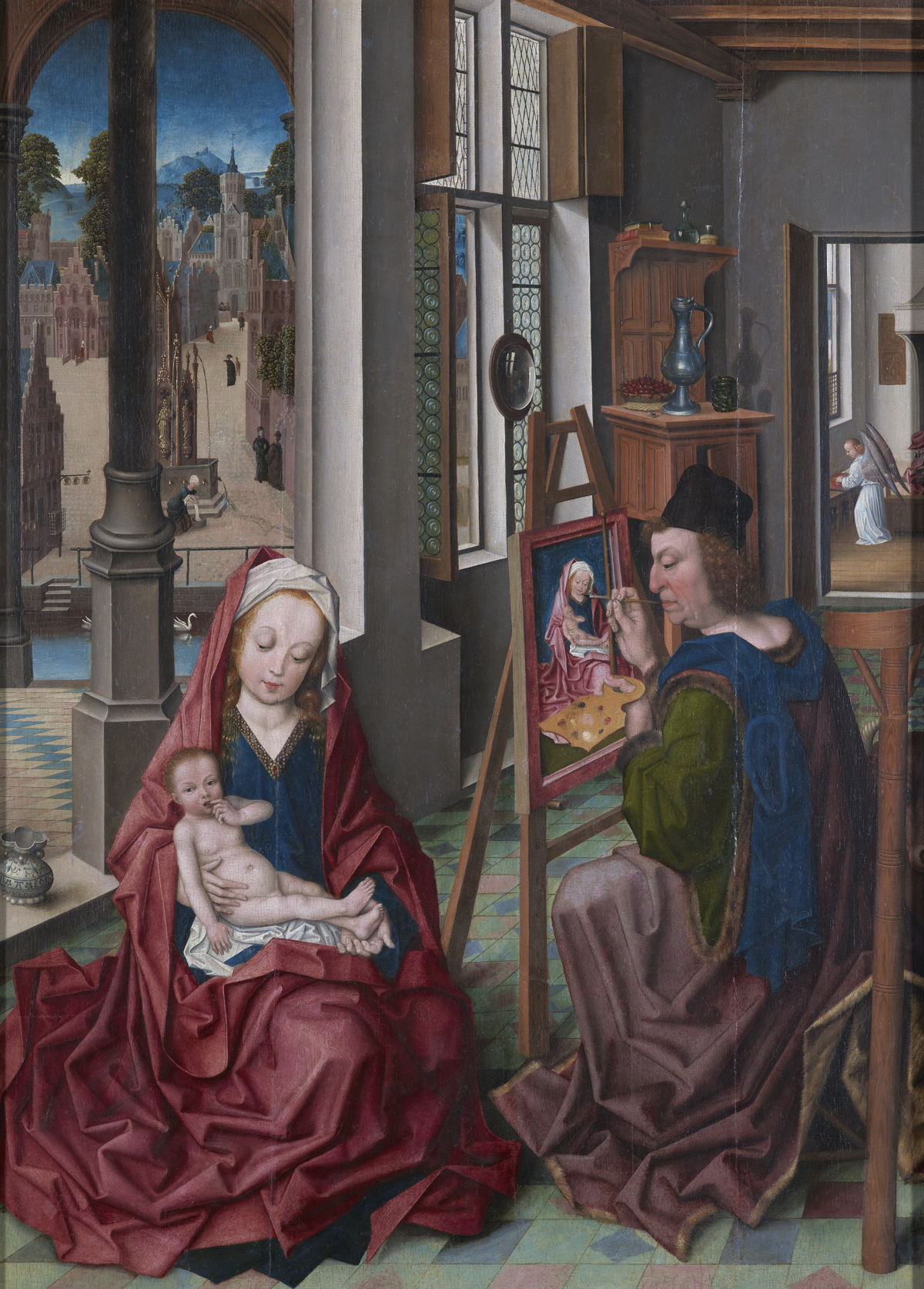
Derick Baegert, Saint Luke Painting the Virgin, c. 1470.

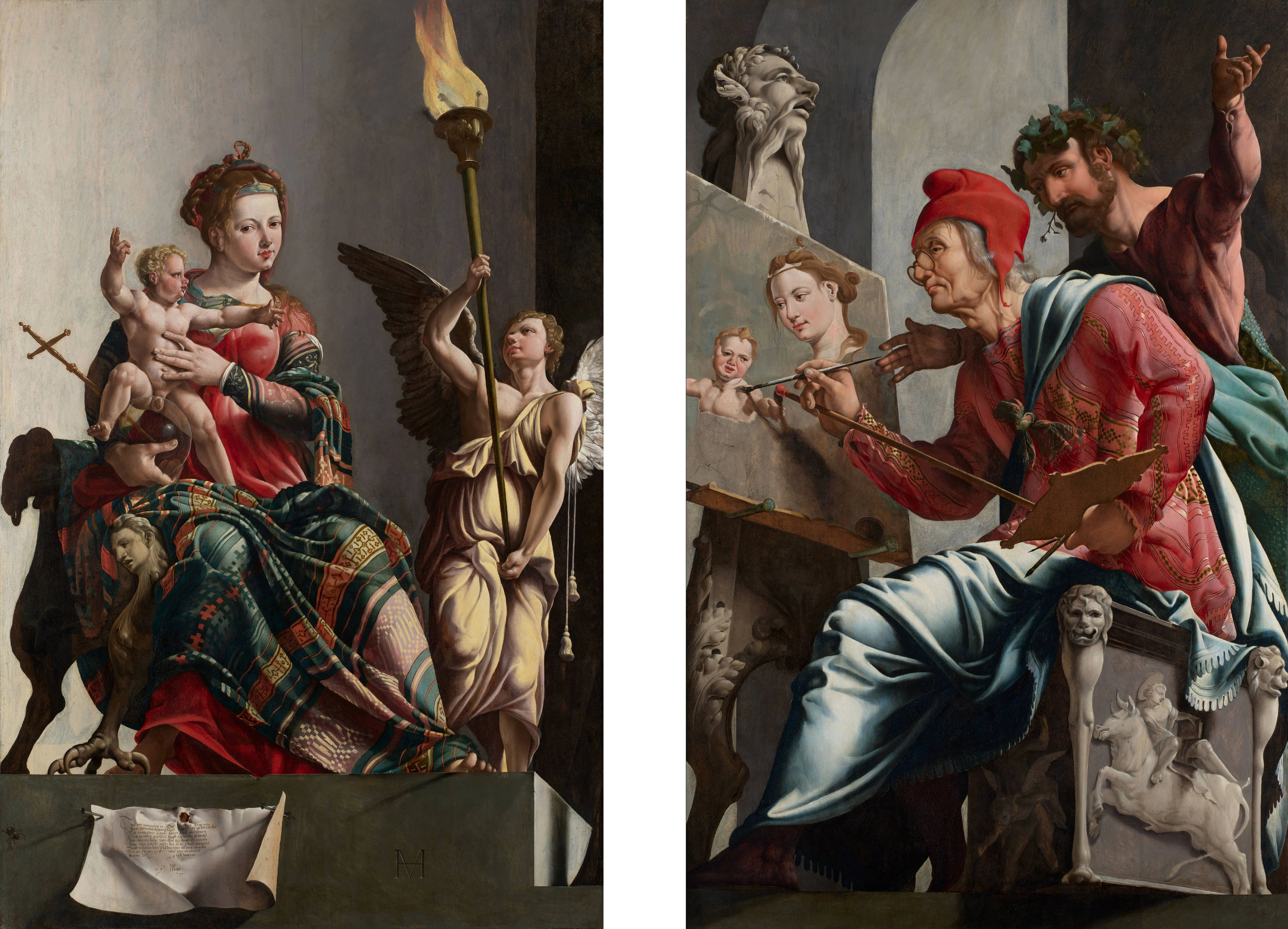
Maarten van Heemskerk painted this diptych before he left Haarlem for Italy in 1532.

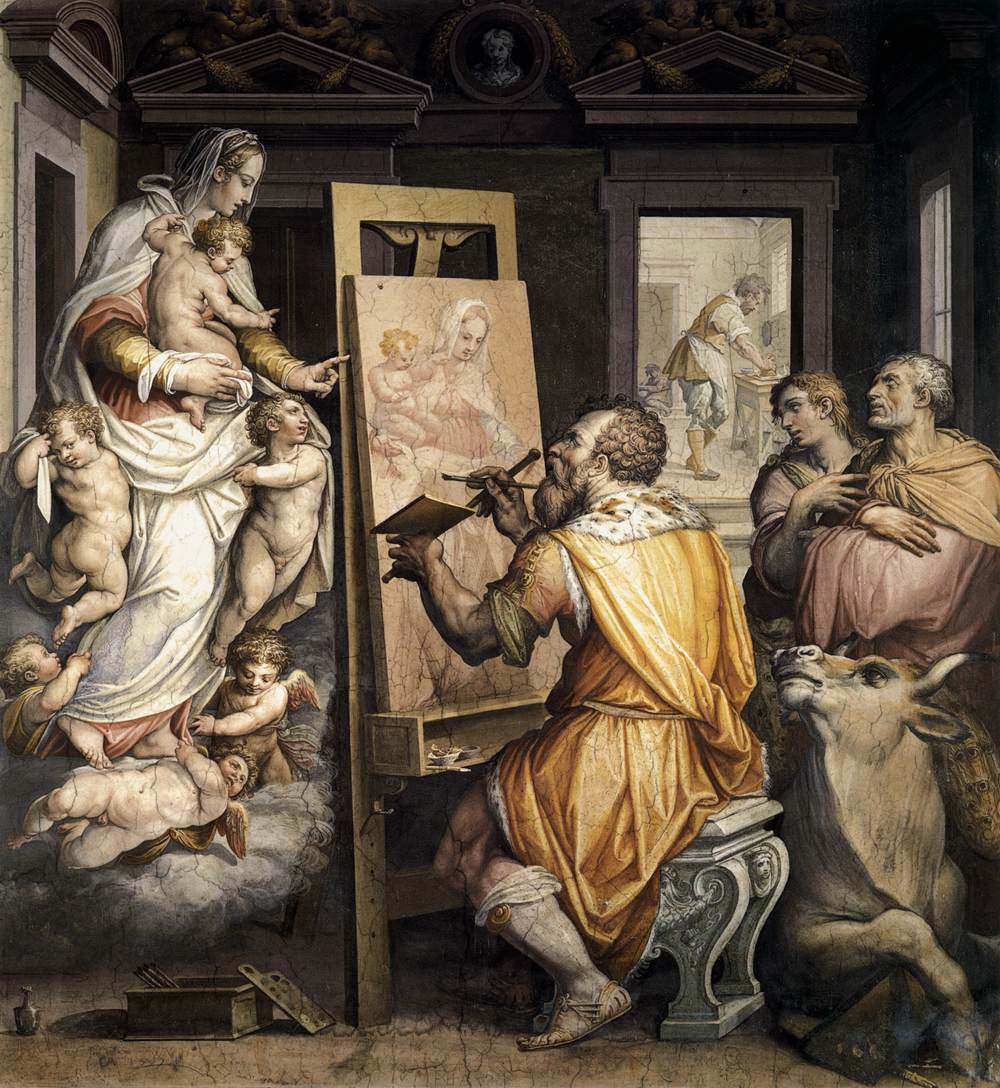
Same theme by Giorgio Vasari.

== See also ==
- Saint Luke painting the Virgin
- Guild
- Guildhall Museum
- Guild of Romanists Club in 17th century Antwerp
- Hanseatic League
- Marketplace
- Merchant
- Painter's Guild in New Spain
- Retail
- Royal Academy of Fine Arts Antwerp Founded in 1663
- Worshipful Company of Glaziers and Painters of Glass London
- Worshipful Company of Painter-Stainers London
