= Ewo (hong) =

Qing dynasty merchant house

The Ewo Hong (Chinese: 怡和行; pinyin: Yíhé Háng; Jyutping: ji4 wo4 hong2) was a Qing dynasty hong established by Wǔ Guóyíng (traditional Chinese: 伍國瑩; simplified Chinese: 伍国莹) in Canton (Guangzhou) in 1783 and later became the leader of the cohong of the Thirteen Factories under the stewardship of Howqua, who took over in 1803. Ewo later became one of the most successful hongs and the largest creditor of the East India Company, whilst Howqua's personal monetary worth reached more than 26 million Mexican dollars. As a result of the Ewo hong's upright and honest reputation, Jardine, Matheson & Co. later adopted "Ewo" as the Chinese name for their firm.
