= Cohong =

Qing dynasty merchant guilds

- Traditional Chinese: 公行
- Simplified Chinese: 公行
- Literal meaning: "public trade"
Transcriptions
Standard Mandarin
- Hanyu Pinyin: gōng háng
- IPA: [kʊ́ŋ xǎŋ]
Yue: Cantonese
- Yale Romanization: gùng hòhng
- Jyutping: gung1 hong4
- IPA: [kʊ̂ŋ hɔ̏ːŋ]

The Cohong, sometimes spelled kehang or gonghang, a guild of Chinese merchants or hongs, operated the import–export monopoly in Canton (present-day Guangzhou) during the Qing dynasty (1644–1911). During the century prior to the First Opium War of 1839–1842, trade relations between China and Europe took place exclusively via the Cohong – a system formalised by an imperial edict of the Qianlong Emperor in 1738. The Chinese merchants who made up the Cohong were referred to as hangshang (行商) and their foreign counterparts as yanghang (洋行，literally "foreign traders").

== Foundation and structure ==
In 1738, the Baoshang system was established. This system granted a number of Chinese merchants license to trade with Western merchants as long as they helped to collect duties from the Westerners, successfully aligning trading interests with the government's revenue collection. This was the predecessor for the later Cohong system.

According to John Phipps, author of the 19th century Practical Treatise on the China and Eastern Trade, the merchant Poankeequa (潘启官) founded the guild in the 1790s, although Chinese historian Immanuel C.Y. Hsu cites an earlier date of 1738.

Number of Chinese Merchants Operating in Canton
| Year | Number | Year | Number | Year | Number | Year | Number |
|---|---|---|---|---|---|---|---|
| 1757 | 26 | 1791 | 5~6 | 1811 | 10~12 | 1831 | 10 |
| 1759 | >20 | 1792 | 12 | 1813 | 10~13 | 1832 | 10 |
| 1760 | 9 | 1794 | 10 | 1815 | 10 | 1833 | 10 |
| 1765 | 10 | 1795 | 10 | 1822 | 11 | 1834 | 10 |
| 1776 | 8 | 1796 | 10 | 1823 | 11 | 1835 | 10 |
| 1777 | 8 | 1798 | 8 | 1824 | 10 | 1836 | 11 |
| 1778 | 8 | 1799 | 8 | 1825 | 10 | 1837 | 13 |
| 1779 | 8 | 1800 | 8 | 1826 | 10 | 1838 | 11 |
| 1781 | 4 | 1801 | 8 | 1827 | 9 | 1839 | 10 |
| 1782 | 9 | 1807 | 12 | 1828 | 7 | | |
| 1786 | 20 | 1808 | 9 | 1829 | 7 | | |
| 1790 | 5 | 1810 | 10 | 1830 | 10 | | |

Over time, membership of the Cohong fluctuated between five and 26 merchants authorized by the Qing Imperial Government to handle trade, particularly rights to trade tea and silk, with the West. They were the only group at the time authorized to do this, making them the main controllers of all foreign trade in the nation.

== Trade with the West ==
Within the city of Canton (Guangzhou, 广州) the Cohong were granted the Qing Empire's monopoly on foreign trade, overseeing the trade between western silver from the New World and valued goods from the Qing Empire Cohong merchant guilds therefore represented the primary link between the government of the Qing dynasty and the rest of the world. As Guangzhou represented the only official port of trade between the Qing trade network and European trading powers, the Cohong enjoyed a virtual monopoly over the trade with the west, and as such reaped the benefits of the Westerners' insatiable appetite for porcelain, silk, and most of all, tea. Under the oversight of a ministry of revenue official known to the British as the "Hoppo" (a mispronunciation of the term hubu, 户部), the Cohong, from their offices known as hangs, held a monopoly over trade with the Western trade warehouses and the incredibly important silver they represented for the Qing economy.

Despite controlling the trade between European powers and the Qing Empire, the Cohong often held precarious positions, with the Hoppo holding tremendous power over their appointment and their finances. Additionally, because of the low social status of merchants within traditional Confucian social hierarchy, the Cohong merchants were often at the mercy of their bureaucratic masters within the Hoppo. Throughout his three-year term in the office, a Cohong merchant would be forced to pay numerous bribes, levies, donations, and gifts to his superiors, resulting in a steep drop in profits.

Nevertheless, as a result of the lucrative trade they controlled, Cohong guilds became very wealthy, with their personal fortunes numbering among the highest in the Qing dynasty, and even in the world. To maintain their influence they ensured that local residents and officials up to the highest level of the bureaucracy made overtures to the Qing government to maintain Canton's status as the sole site of official trade with the western world. From time to time, this municipal trade monopoly came to rankle the British government, who sought out other ports of call through which to obtain the goods that their Empire craved.

== Consoo fund ==
The Cohong further functioned as controller of the Consoo Fund (公所, gōngsuǒ)(actually the name of the office of the Cohong in Thirteen Factory Street), a system established in 1781 that utilized a pool of money raised by levies (公所费, gōngsuǒfèi) on the trades of individual merchants to cover the debts of any bankrupt hong at year end and to pay the various exactions demanded by the government and the Hoppo bureaucrats. Officially, the rate levied for the fund was 3% of the value of goods. This tax originally applied only to tea but by the late eighteenth century had expanded to cover 69 different products.

== Opium trade ==
Due to the heavy need for silver in the trade between European colonial powers and the Qing in Canton and complications with its silver supply due to revolts within the American Colonies, the British required a substitute for the precious metal. In short order, British merchants employed opium as a valuable trade good to obtain the goods it desired. As the Qing Empire's trade with the West transitioned from silver to opium, the Cohong Guilds transitioned themselves to the trade in the addictive narcotic substance. Opium from British India moved swiftly into the Chinese markets, largely overtaking silver as the most traded good between British merchants and the Qing dynasty. Despite the Daoguang Emperor's many opium prohibition edicts throughout the early nineteenth century, the Western trade upon which the Cohong merchantmen built their livelihoods now centered around the drug, and as such the merchants participated heavily in the narcotic trade. Within the city of Canton, in which western trade represented the center of the economic structure, the Qing Emperor's edicts held little effect over the trade hierarchy.

From Lintin Island, the small island near Guangzhou on which the European states moored their boats, the Cohong merchants facilitated the use of small smuggling vessels known as "fast crabs" or "shifting dragons" in order to transport the illicit substance from Lintin to the warehouses within Canton. These boats were necessary to avoid Qing search and seizure of the opium and ensure its arrival in Canton, after which the Cohong took over the process, trading their goods for the opium and preparing it to enter Qing Territory. While the Cohong did not participate directly in the opium trade within China (this was accomplished through other merchants, and the distribution handled by criminals and social outcasts, such as migrants), they were the first part of the process through which the substance entered China.

== End ==
After the British victory in the First Opium War, the Treaty of Nanjing, signed in 1842, extracted several British demands from the Qing government, in particular the end of the Canton system and the dissolution of the Cohong merchants' guilds. In the wake of this decision, trade moved from the Confucian merchant-to-merchant systems of the Qing Empire to the more diplomatic official-to-official trading systems of the British Empire.

== See also ==
- Germania (guild) – Merchants' guilds in Valencia, Spain
- Guildhall Museum
- Guild of Romanists Club in 17th century Antwerp
- Hanseatic League – Merchants' guilds in Europe, especially the Baltic region
- Howqua
- Jāti – guilds (of mediaeval origin) in India
- Marketplace
- Old China Trade
- Painter's Guild in New Spain
- Retail
- Shreni – Association of merchants, traders and artisans in India
- Trade Guilds of South India
- Trade union
- Za (guilds) – Merchants' guilds in Japan
- Ten Great Merchant Guilds
- Jiao (commercial guild)
