= Thirteen Factories =

Area of Guangzhou, China, c. 1684 to 1856

Coordinates: 23.109743°N 113.251607°E

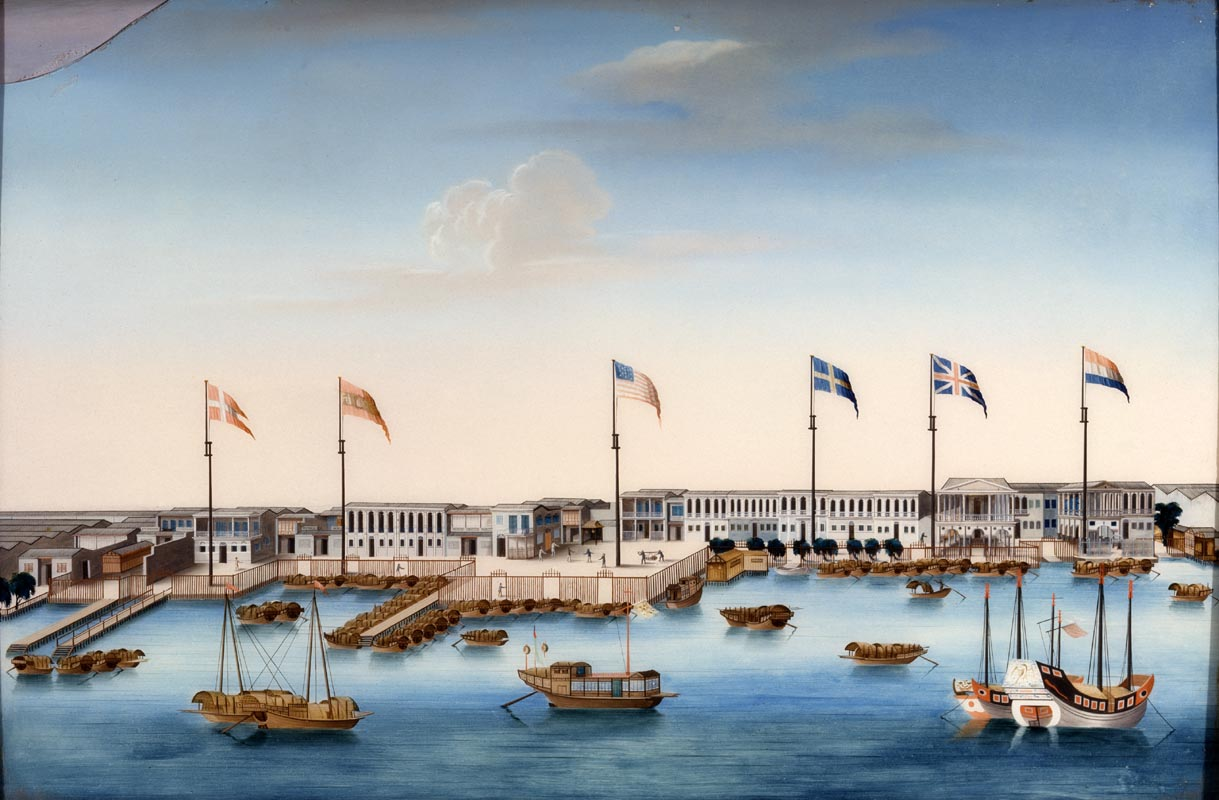
- A reverse-glass export painting of the Thirteen Factories c. 1805, displaying the flags of Denmark, Spain, the United States, Sweden, Britain, and the Netherlands
- Chinese: 十三行
- Literal meaning: The 13 Trading Houses
Transcriptions
Standard Mandarin
- Hanyu Pinyin: Shísān Háng
- Yale Romanization: Shŕsān Háng
- IPA: [ʂɻ̩̌sánxǎŋ]
Yue: Cantonese
- Yale Romanization: Sahp Sàam Hóng
- Jyutping: Sap⁶ Saam¹ Hong²
- IPA: [sɐ̀p sáːm hɔ̌ːŋ]

The Thirteen Factories, also known as the Canton Factories, Thirteen Hongs, or Thirteen Hongs of Canton, was a neighbourhood along the Pearl River in southwestern Guangzhou, China from c. 1684 to 1856 around modern day Sai Kwan, in Guangzhou's Liwan District. These warehouses and stores were the principal and sole legal site of most Western trade with China from 1757 to 1842. The factories were destroyed by fire in 1822 by accident, in 1841 amid the First Opium War, and in 1856 at the onset of the Second Opium War. The factories' importance diminished after the opening of the treaty ports and the end of the Canton System under the terms of the 1842 Anglo-Chinese Treaty of Nanking. After the Second Opium War, the factories were not rebuilt at their former site south of Guangzhou's old walled city but moved, first to Honam Island across the Pearl River and then to Shameen Island south of Guangzhou's western suburbs. Their former site is now part of Guangzhou Cultural Park.

== Terminology ==
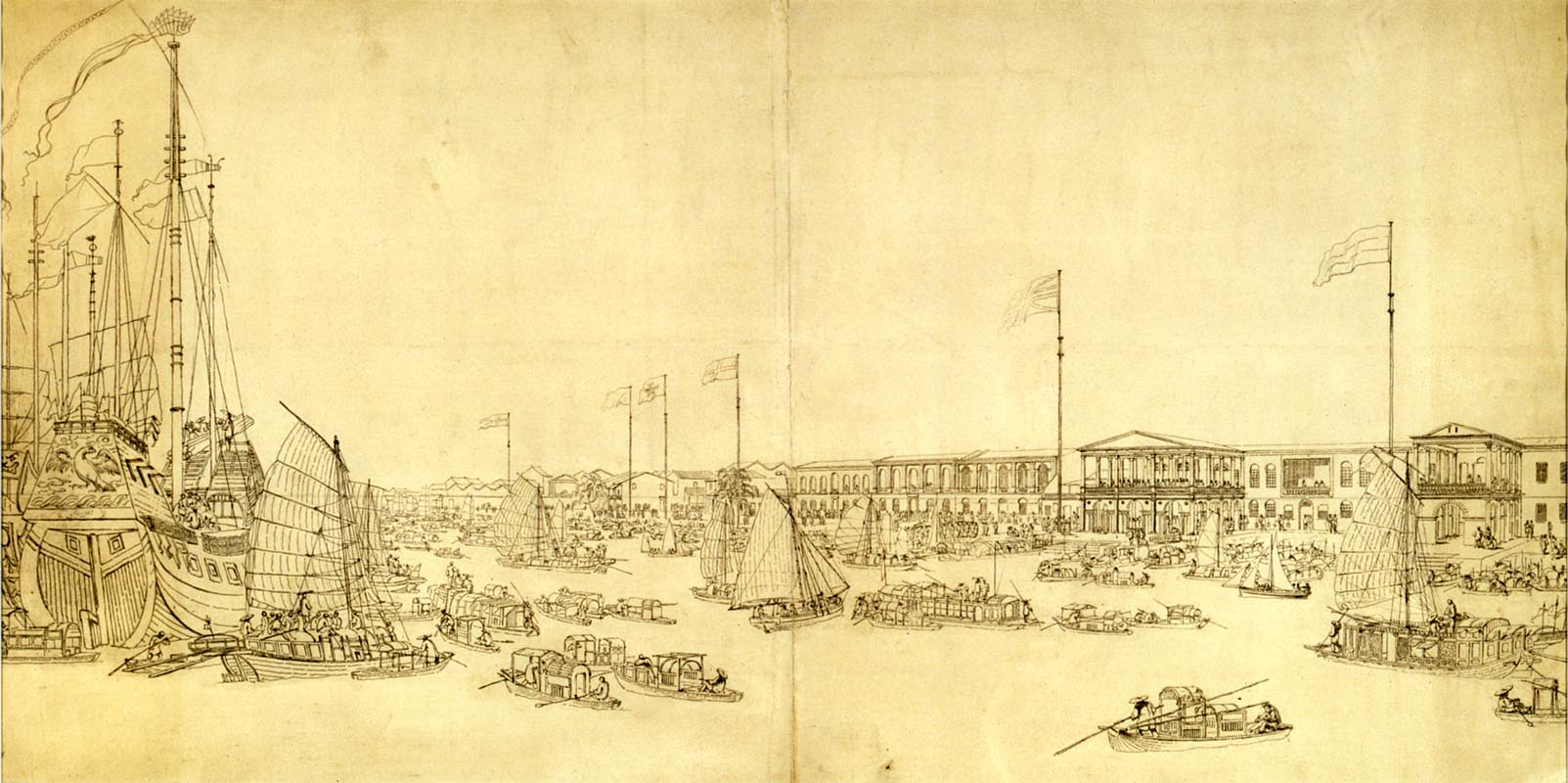
c. 1785 sketch for William Daniell's 1806 The European Factories, Canton

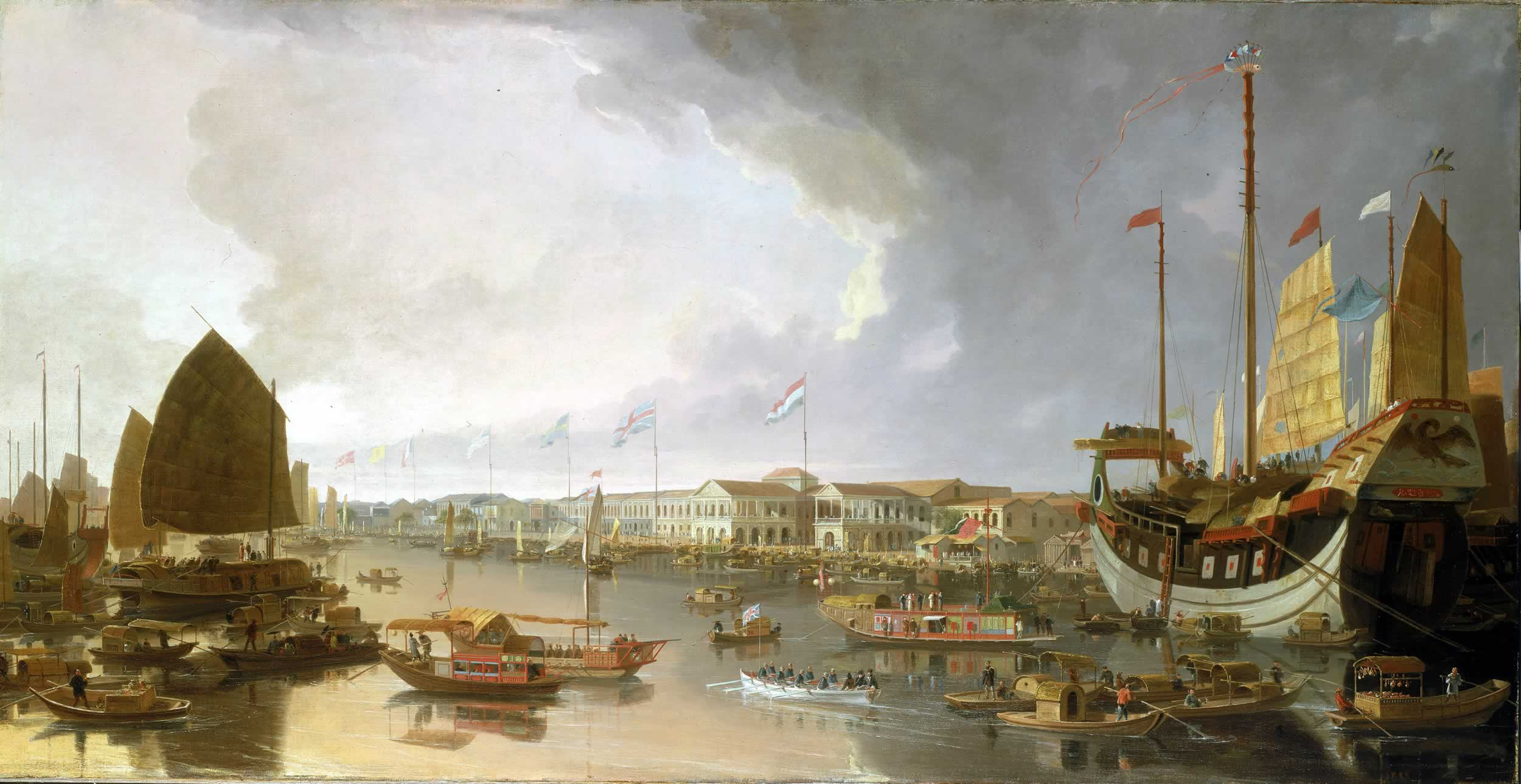
William Daniell's c. 1805 View of the Canton Factories

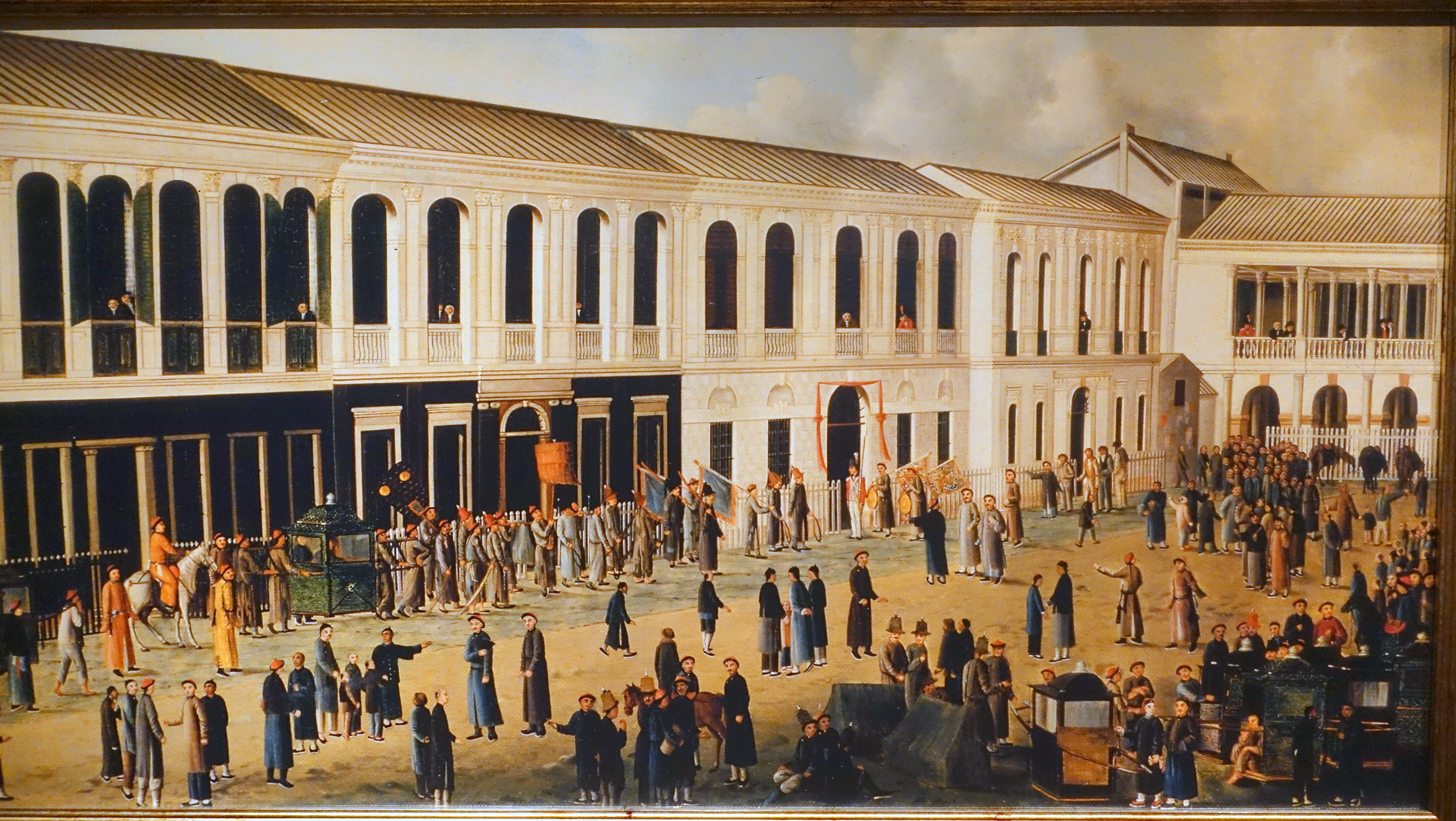
The factories c. 1807

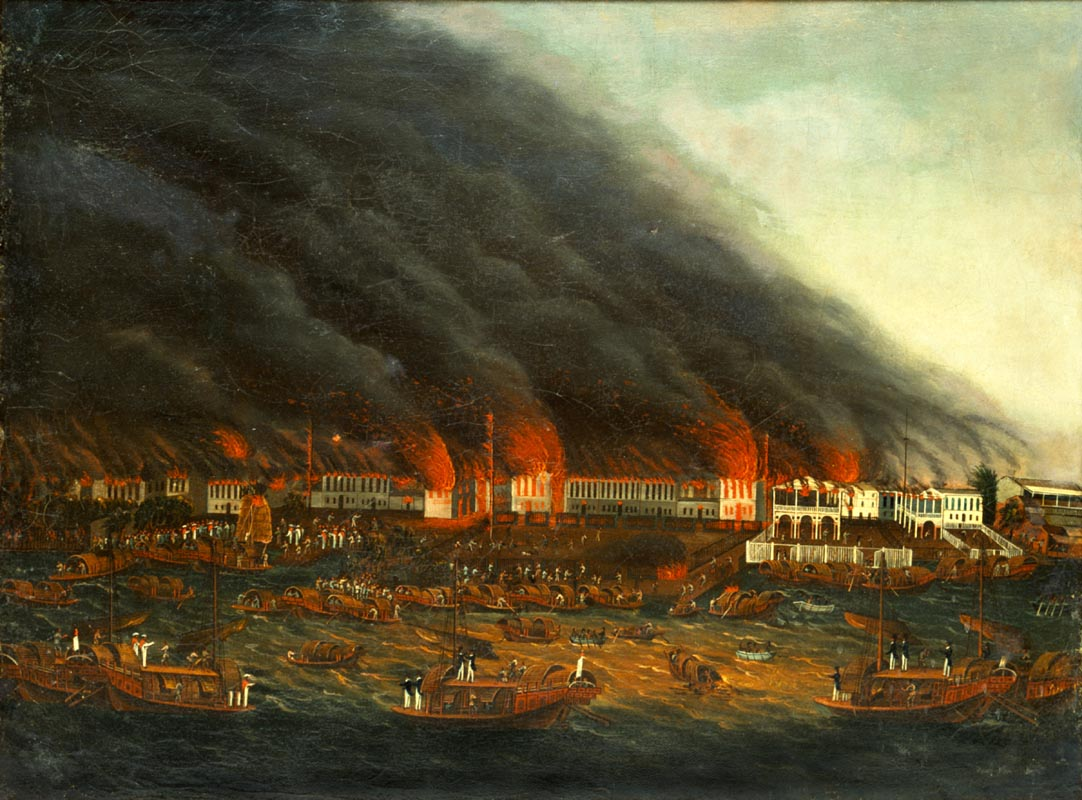
The 1822 fire

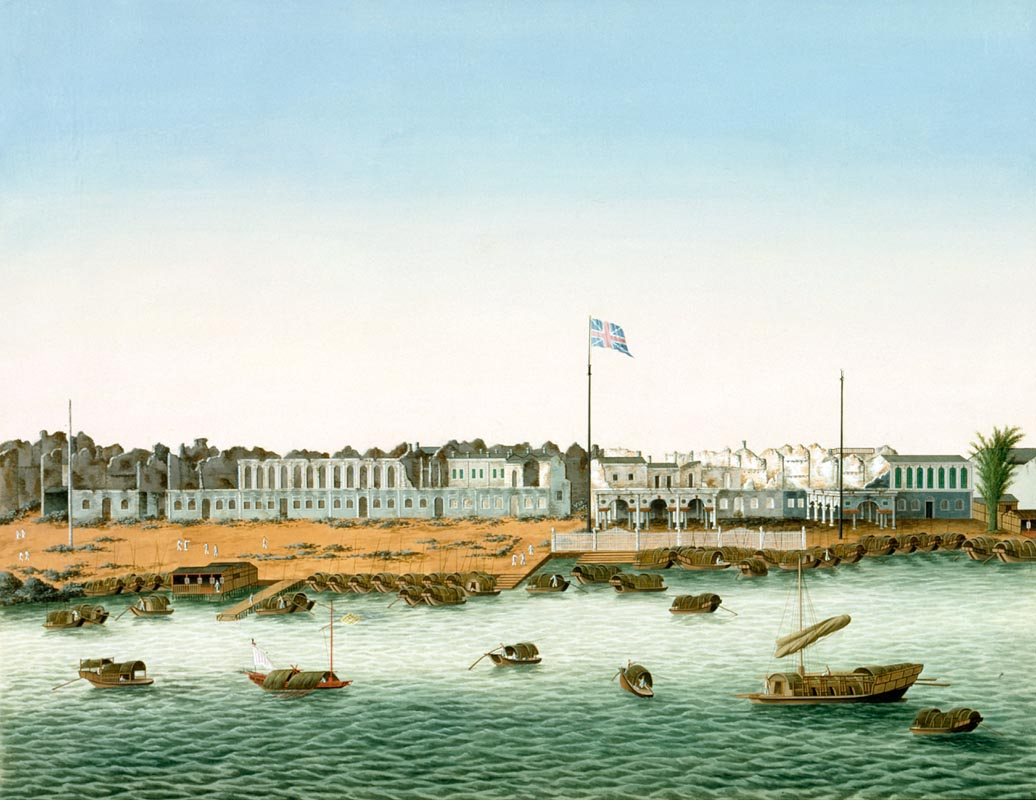
The ruins of the initial factories after the 1822 fire

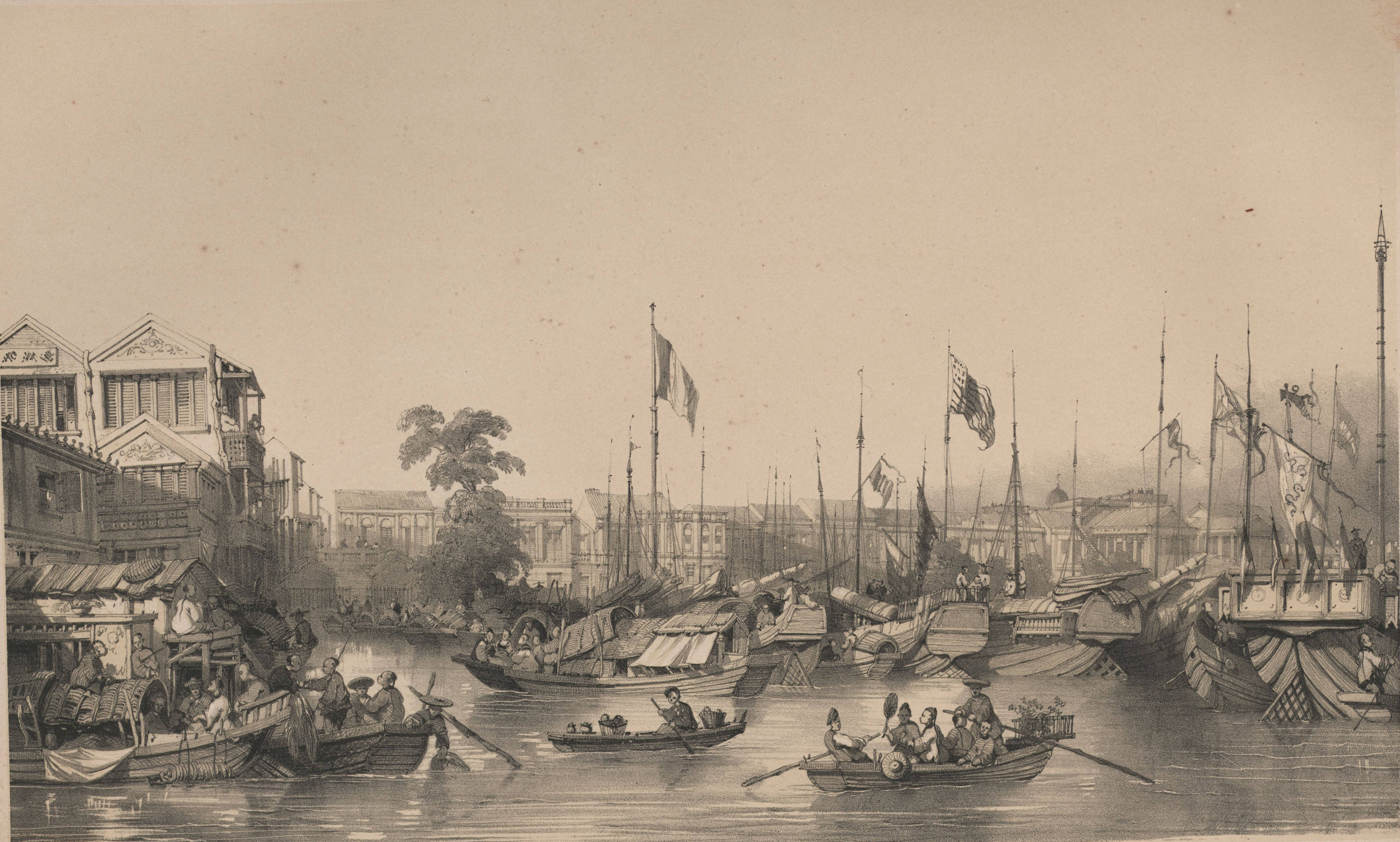
European Factories at Canton (c. 1840) by Auguste Borget

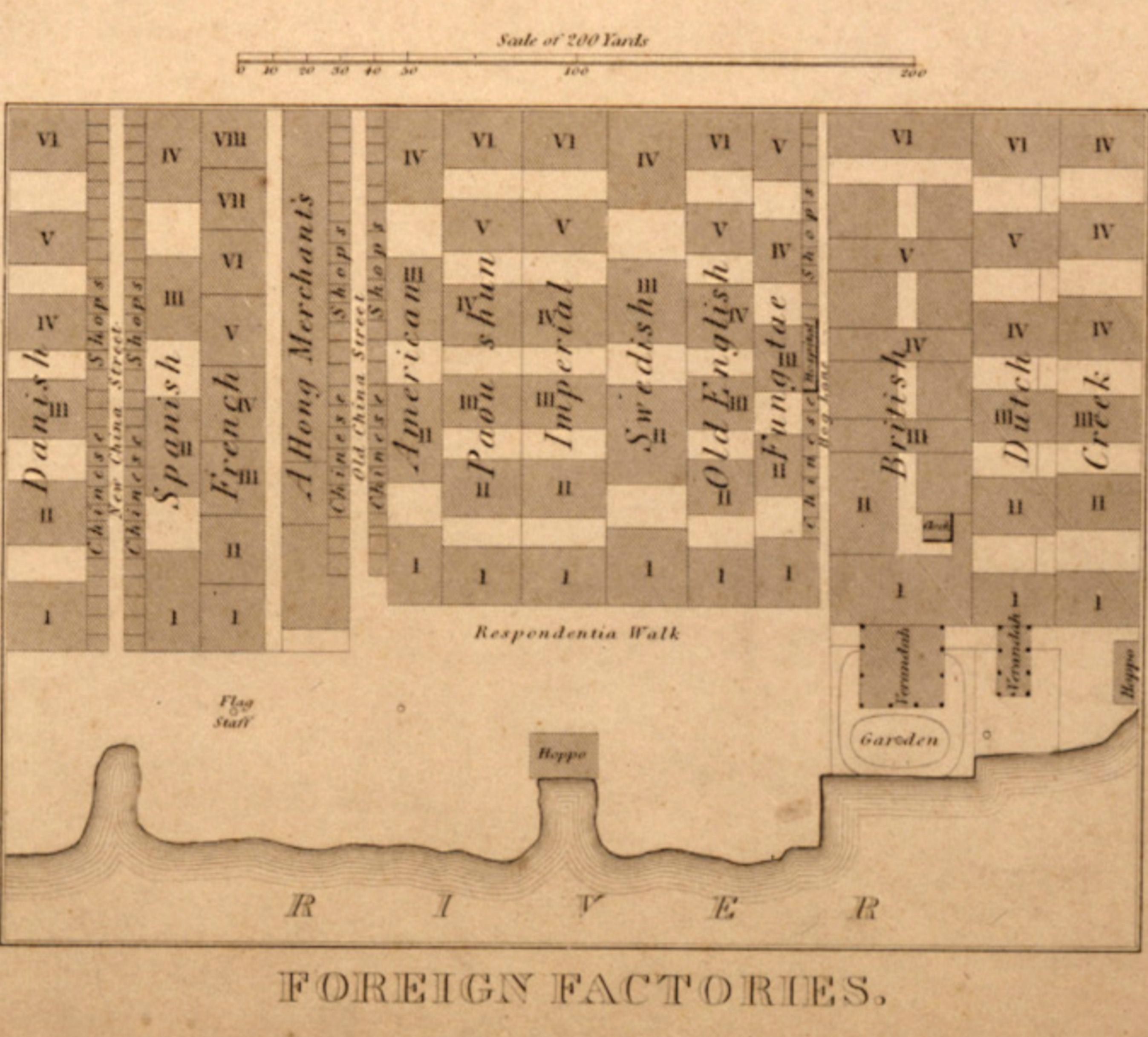
The layout of the factories just before the 1841 fire

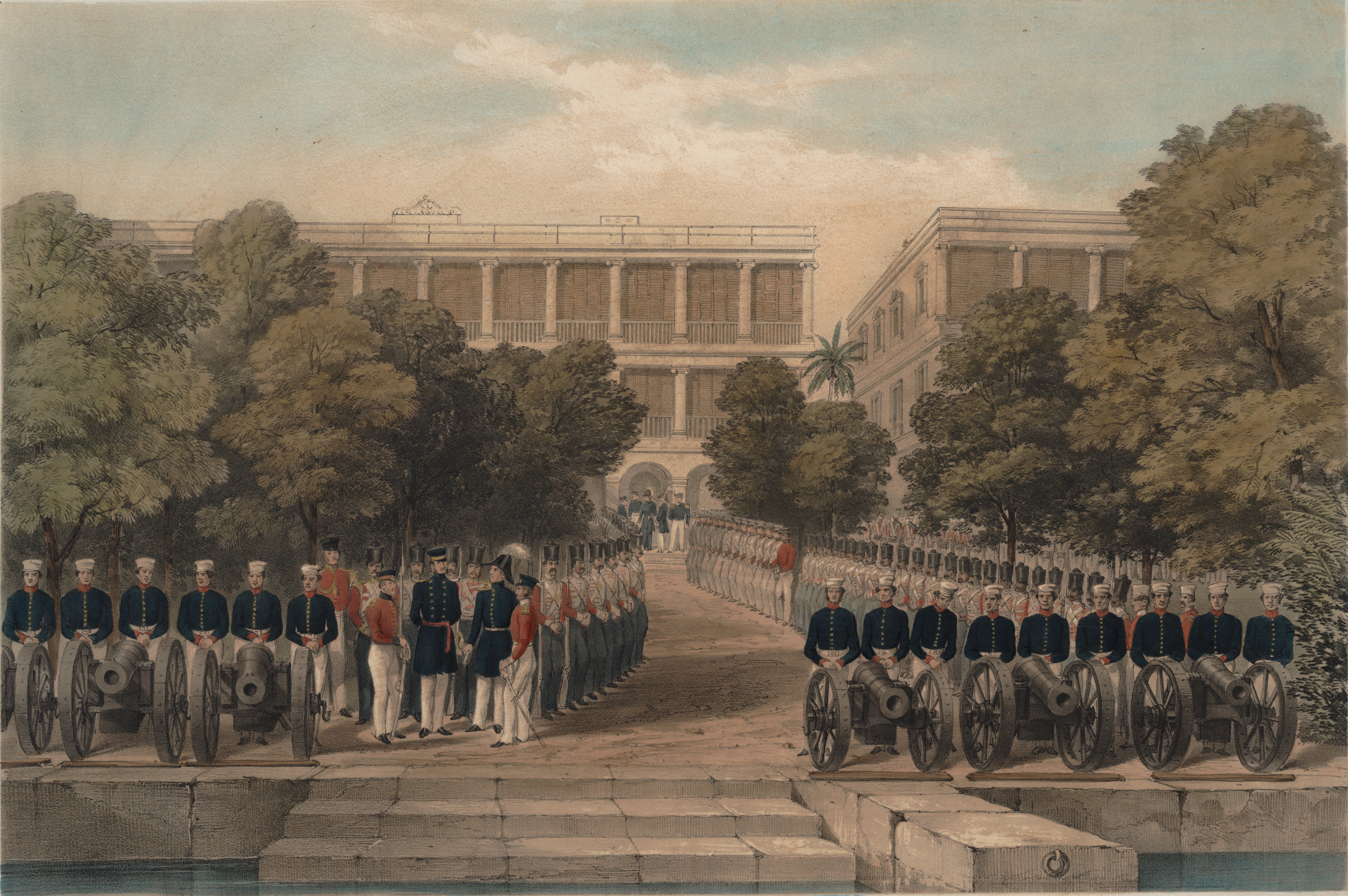
British troops welcoming Viceroy Kiyeng after the Expedition to Canton in 1847

The "factories" were not workshops or manufacturing centres but the offices, trading posts, and warehouses of foreign factors, mercantile fiduciaries who bought and sold goods on consignment for their principals. The word derives from "feitoria" which means trading post in Portuguese (the first westerners to engage in trade with China).

The foreign agents were known at the time as "supercargos" in English and as daban (大班) in Chinese. This term's Cantonese pronunciation, tai-pan, only came into common English use after the rise of private trading from 1834 on. A private captain might be his own supercargo; a large East Indiamen might have five or more, which were ranked "chief supercargo", "2nd supercargo", and so on. A team of supercargos divided their work, some overseeing sales, others tea purchases, silk purchases, and so forth. Permanent supercargos might divide their work by the order ships arrived. The bookkeepers who attended them were called "writers"; those serving with the ship, who also checked these accounts, "pursers".

"Hong" is the Cantonese pronunciation of 行, the Chinese term for a properly-licensed business. By analogy, it was applied to its chief, the Hong merchant, and its property, the factories themselves. It has also been suggested the term was first applied to the factories as they were arranged in a row along the riverbank, "row" or "rank" being an alternative meaning of the same Chinese character.

Hoppo, or fully the "Canton Sea Customs Minister", was the imperial official responsible for imperial customs and supervised the other officials. The word is Chinese Pidgin English, and some speculated that it derived from Hu Bu (Board of Revenue), but the official had no connection to the Board. The Hoppo was responsible for fixing the charges levied as a ship entered the port, a responsibility that allowed him to become quite rich.

== History ==
Since in 1368, a series of sea bans (haijin) restricted China's foreign commerce, at times attempting to ban it completely. In 1684, the foreigners traded with China in the four cities of Guangzhou, Xiamen, Songjiang, and Ningbo. In the case of Guangzhou under the Qing regime, early traders were obliged to follow the monsoon winds, arriving between June and September, conducting their business, and then departing between November and February. The foreign ships were anchored downstream at Pazhou (then known as "Whampoa"), with business conducted in the city's western suburbs. Western traders were further required to work through Chinese merchants who would guarantee their good behavior and tax obligations; they were also the owners and landlords of the warehouses and apartments the traders were obliged to use. In practice, private traders could often avoid these restrictions but the customs superintendent, the hoppo, was always careful to enforce them upon large-volume purchasers such as the East India Company. Typically, cargo was ferried from the ships by its own crew and to the ships at the expense of the Chinese merchants on their "chop boats" (lighters). To avoid theft or piracy, foreign traders began assigning a few of their own seamen to these ships as guards.

In 1686, the Europeans were allowed to rent accommodations in the factory quarter to avoid the necessity of shuttling back to Pazhou each night. For the most part, the supercargos, their assistants, and the bookkeepers stayed at the factories, the crew—except for a few guards or those on shore leave—stayed with the ships, and the captains continued to ferry between the two. A Chinese comprador hired each factory's staff of Chinese servants and bought its provisions from local vendors; senior supercargos sometimes brought their own staff or slaves as well. Another comprador dealt with the ship's provisions at Pazhou, where sampan ladies crowded around the ships to do laundry and odd jobs for the sailors. A few weeks before departure, the crew came to the factories in shifts of a few days each for shore leave, chaperoned by some of the ship's officers. Hog Lane was lined with open-fronted booths and shops catering to them, selling food, drink, clothing, and "chowchows" (novelties), and was policed by Chinese guards stationed at both ends of the alley. At first the supercargos came and left with the ships, but over the course of the 18th century companies began to rent their factory spaces year-round to avoid being displaced on their return. The supercargos were then permitted to outstay their company's ships a few weeks to conduct business for the next season; after that, they were obliged to remove themselves to Macao through the spring and summer until the appearance of the next ship. By the 1760s, every East India company had permanent supercargos and rooms were being rented in Macao year-round as well.

In the mid-1750s, the East India Company realized that the fees and taxes were both slightly better at Ningpo city; it was also nearer the main centres of Chinese tea production and silk manufacture. The impact of their shift on Guangzhou's tax receipts and a fear of a second Macao being created prompted attempts to force Ningbo to make itself less attractive. When that failed, the 1757 edict closed all ports but Guangzhou's to most Europeans. (Note: Korean and Japanese trade was organised separately at Zhapu in Zhejiang; Russians, due to their presence on China's northern borders, traded first at Beijing and then at Kyakhta.) In order to keep the traders in the factory area and out of the rest of the western suburbs, the 17 Chinese merchants of the port were obliged to establish the guild known to foreigners as the "Cohong" in 1760, each paying an entrance fee of around 10,000 Spanish dollars (74,000 tls.) and submitting to a levy of about 3% on their future business. Ten of the merchants did so, the fees establishing the Consoo Fund and Hall, walkways, and a new street to which small-scale merchants were obliged to move in order to continue selling to the foreign traders. (Note: Shops also lined 13 Factories Street between Hog Lane and China Street, creating a horseshoe-shaped path along which the traders and seamen could browse the wares on offer.) Since the new street was particularly full of porcelain dealers, it came to be known as China Street. The Hong merchants included Howqua (伍秉鑑), Puankhequa, Mowqua, Goqua, Fatqua, Kingqua, Sunshing, Mingqua, Saoqua, and Punboqua. Despite the existence of Sinophones and the linguists usually accompanying each ship, foreigners were notionally banned by imperial decree from learning the Cantonese language, there being officially appointed translators for that purpose. The foreign traders—despite most working for government monopolies themselves—protested strongly at the Cohong's control over prices, advances, and exchange rates and predicted the death of trade with China. In fact, the Cohong helped ensure Chinese production met the traders' needs—some ships had previously been obliged to wait as much as a year to be fully stocked—and by 1769, the area was being expanded to make up for an extreme shortness of apartments. In 1748, there had only been eight factories, but there were seventeen by 1770, a number kept up until the great fire of 1822.

It was discovered that, rather than depending on the monsoon winds, ships could arrive or depart at any time of year by rounding the Philippines. This opened the trade for smaller craft who might only need a few weeks to complete a visit, where the large company vessels still needed 4 to 5 months at minimum. Subsequently, the British and Americans typically always had ships anchored off Pazhou, allowing them to keep their supercargos and staff in the Guangzhou factories all year. During the 1780s, the Spanish also began to send several ships from Manila each year rather than the single vessel they had previously used; they began renting a permanent factory in 1788. (In practice, senior supercargos tended to prefer Macao during the summer regardless and to send their junior officers to deal with off-season trade.)

In 1793, George III sent George Macartney to request that ports in northern China be opened to trade but was rejected by the Qianlong Emperor, not due to Macartney's refusal to bow to Qianlong, as is commonly believed. A second embassy under Lord Amherst fared no better in 1816–1817. The growth of European (particularly British) tea consumption supplemented the port's heavy trade in silk and porcelain. The balancing trade in goods from Europe was poor so payments had to be settled in large volumes of bullion until the trade in opium rose to take its place.

In 1835, the medical missionary Peter Parker opened an ophthalmic hospital in the area. Parker commissioned Lam Qua, a Western-trained Chinese painter who also had workshops in the area, to paint pre-operative portraits of patients who had large tumors or other major deformities.

The viceroy Lin Zexu's vigorous suppression of the British opium trade precipitated the First Opium War (1839–1842), during which the factories were burnt to the ground. The 1842 Treaty of Nanking ending that war forced the ceding of Hong Kong Island to the British and opened the treaty ports of Shanghai, Ningbo ("Ningpo"), Xiamen ("Amoy"), and Fuzhou ("Fuchow"). It nominally opened the walled city of Guangzhou to the foreigners, but this was subsequently resisted by the city's viceroys on a number of pretexts. The factories were rebuilt at their former location but, with their diminished importance, they were not rebuilt a third time after their destruction at the onset of the Second Opium War. Instead, the foreign traders first operated off of Honam Island on the other side of the Pearl River and then, after the war's conclusion, rebuilt their Guangzhou operations at a new enclave on the Shamian sandbar south of the city's western suburbs.

== Organization ==
Under the Canton System, between 1757 and 1842, Western merchants in China were restricted to live and conduct their business only in the approved area of the port of Guangzhou and only through government-approved merchant houses. Their factories formed a tight-knit community, which the historian Jacques Downs called a "golden ghetto" because it was both isolated and lucrative.

These hongs—first established by Puankhequa (潘啟官) and nine others in 1760—were granted a lucrative monopoly on foreign trade in exchange for various payments and obligations to the local officials of the Qing state. The hongs were organised into a guild known as the cohong, which also oversaw the Thai and domestic trade in the South China Sea. The Hoppo was appointed by the emperor to oversee taxation and customs collection; he also oversaw disputes among the merchants, in an attempt to restrain the foreigners from contacting the imperial government in Beijing directly.

== Architecture ==
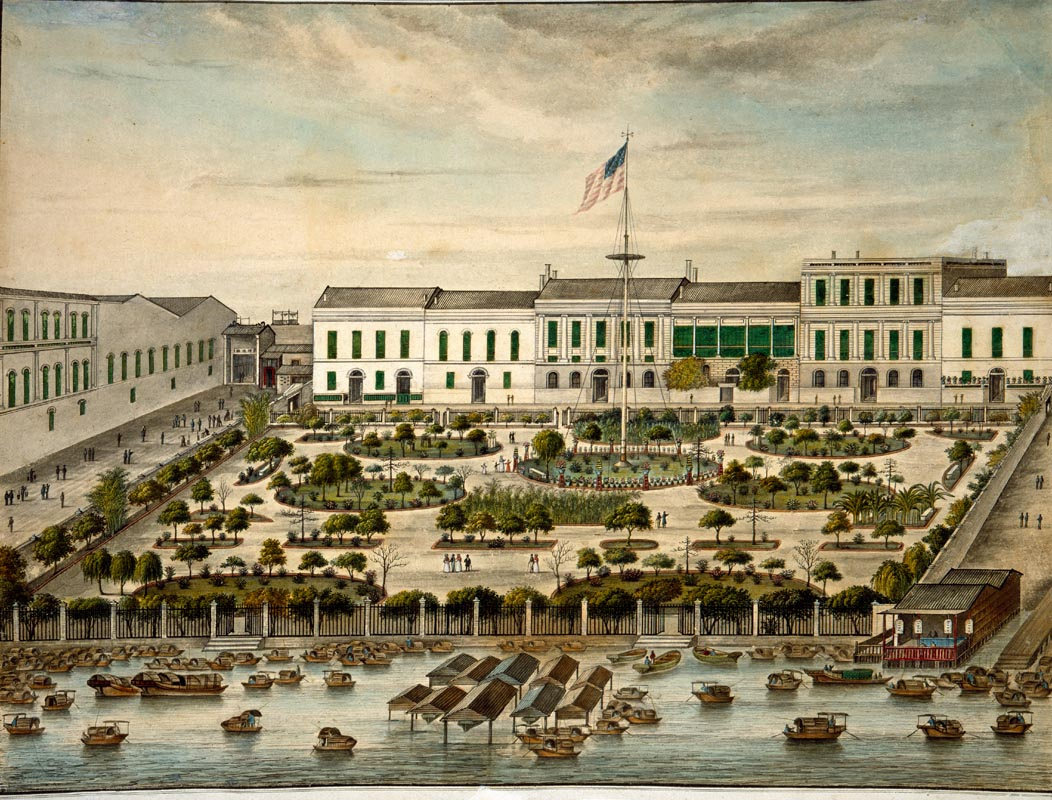
The garden of the American factory c. 1845

The Western merchants were allowed to occupy two- or three-story buildings set back about 100 yards (91 m) from the river. Each factory contained a number of houses. The warehouses occupied the ground floors; the upper floors were taken up by living areas. The square in front of the factories was fenced off, with Chinese access restricted. There were no wells or access to running water. Chinese servants were used to bring in drinking and wash water and to empty the factories' chamber pots.

The façades of the buildings used Western classical designs, but the structures otherwise were merchant buildings of local style. The layout featured courtyards, long, narrow hallways, with rooms on either side. Construction materials were local, such as brick with tile roofs, but the windows and stairs came from British sources abroad.

== Layout ==
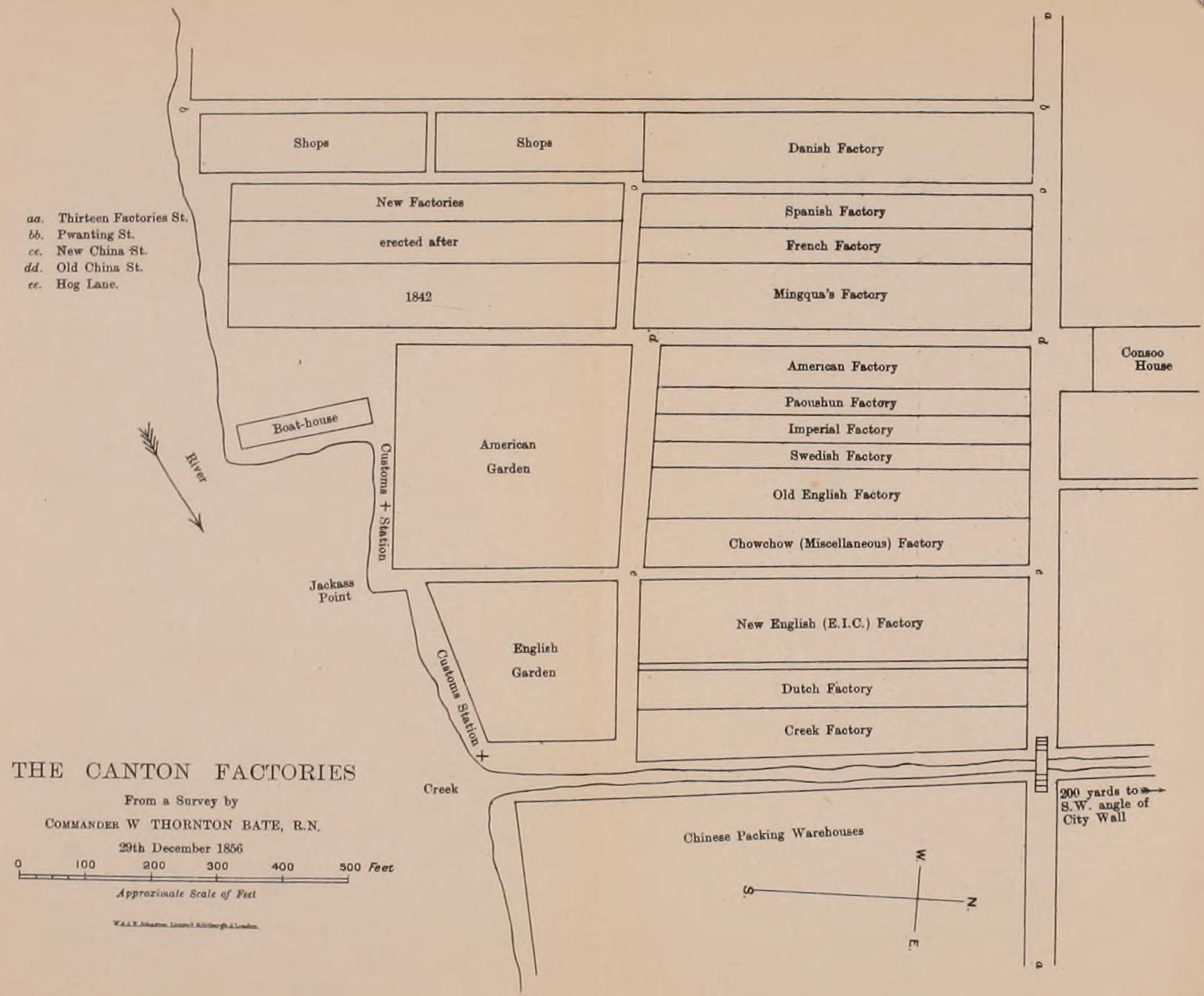
The layout of the factories just before the 1856 fire

The area was bound on the north by Thirteen Factory Street, on the west by Pwanting Street, and on the east by a small creek. Old China Street, New China Street, and Hog Lane divided the groups of factories from one another and were lined by retail stores selling a wide variety of Chinese goods. Peter Parker's hospital was located at 3 Hog Lane.

The area of the factories was approximately 300 m (980 ft) from east to west and a roughly equivalent distance from Thirteen Factory Street south to the Pearl River for a total area of about 9 ha (22 acres).

The exact number of factories varied, but by the early 19th century it became stable at 17 or 18 including, from east to west:

| English name | Literal Translation/Transliteration | | | Chinese name (Cantonese) | |
| English name | Traditional | Simplified | Pinyin | Characters | Jyutping |
|---|---|---|---|---|---|
| Creek Factory | 小溪館 | 小溪馆 | Xiǎoxī Guǎn | 怡和行 | Ji4 Wo4 Hong2 |
| Dutch Factory | 荷蘭館 | 荷兰馆 | Hélán Guǎn | 集義行 | Zaap6 Ji6 Hong2 |
| British Factory (New English Factory) | 新英國館 | 新英国馆 | Xīn Yīngguó Guǎn | 保和行 | Bou2 Wo4 Hong2 |
| Fung-tae Factory; Chow-Chow Factory (Miscellaneous Factory) | 炒炒館 | 炒炒馆 | Chǎochǎo Guǎn | 豐泰行 巴斯行 | Fung1 Taai3 Hong2; Baa1 Si1 Hong2 |
| Old English Factory | 舊英國館 | 旧英国馆 | Jiù Yīngguó Guǎn | 隆順行 | Lung4 Seon6 Hong2 |
| Swedish Factory | 瑞典館 | 瑞典馆 | Ruìdiǎn Guǎn | 瑞行 | Seoi6 Hong2 |
| "Imperial Factory" (Austrian Factory) | 帝國館 | 帝国馆 | Dìguó Guǎn | 孖鹰行 | Maa1 Jing1 Hong2 |
| Paoushun Factory | 寶順館 | 宝顺馆 | Bǎoshùn Guǎn | 寶順行 | Bou2 Seon6 Hong2 |
| American Factory | 美國館 | 美国馆 | Měiguó Guǎn | 廣源行 | Gwong2 Jyun4 Hong2 |
| Mingqua's Factory | 明官館 | 明官馆 | Míngguān Guǎn | 中和行 | Zung1 Wo4 Hong2 |
| French Factory | 法蘭西館 | 法兰西馆 | Fǎlánxī Guǎn | 高公行 | Gou1 Gung1 Hong2 |
| Spanish Factory | 西班牙館 | 西班牙馆 | Xībānyá Guǎn | 大呂宋行 lit. 'Great Luzon trade house' | Daai6 Leoi5 Sung3 Hong2 |
| Danish Factory | 丹麥館 | 丹麦馆 | Dānmài Guǎn | 黃旗行 lit. 'yellow banner trade house' | Wong4 Kei4 Hong2 |

The Chow-Chow Factory was indirectly linked to the British East India Company.

== Legacy ==
The former site of the thirteen factories is now part of the Cultural Park. Thirteen Factories Street, which ran north of the enclave, is now named Shisanhang Road (十三行路).

Hong Kong Maritime Museum has a 250 year old painting of the Thirteen Factories. Another two copies of the painting are on display at Rijksmuseum and British Library. A gigapixel scan of the image is publicly available on Google Arts & Culture.

== See also ==
- Canton System and Old China Trade
- Hong and Cohong
- Henan, Pazhou, Changzhou, and Xiaoguwei islands
- Dejima and Zaibatsu, Japanese equivalents
- Economy of China and the Economic history of imperial China
