= Vermeer Centre =

Dutch information center

Coordinates: 52°00′44″N 4°21′34″E

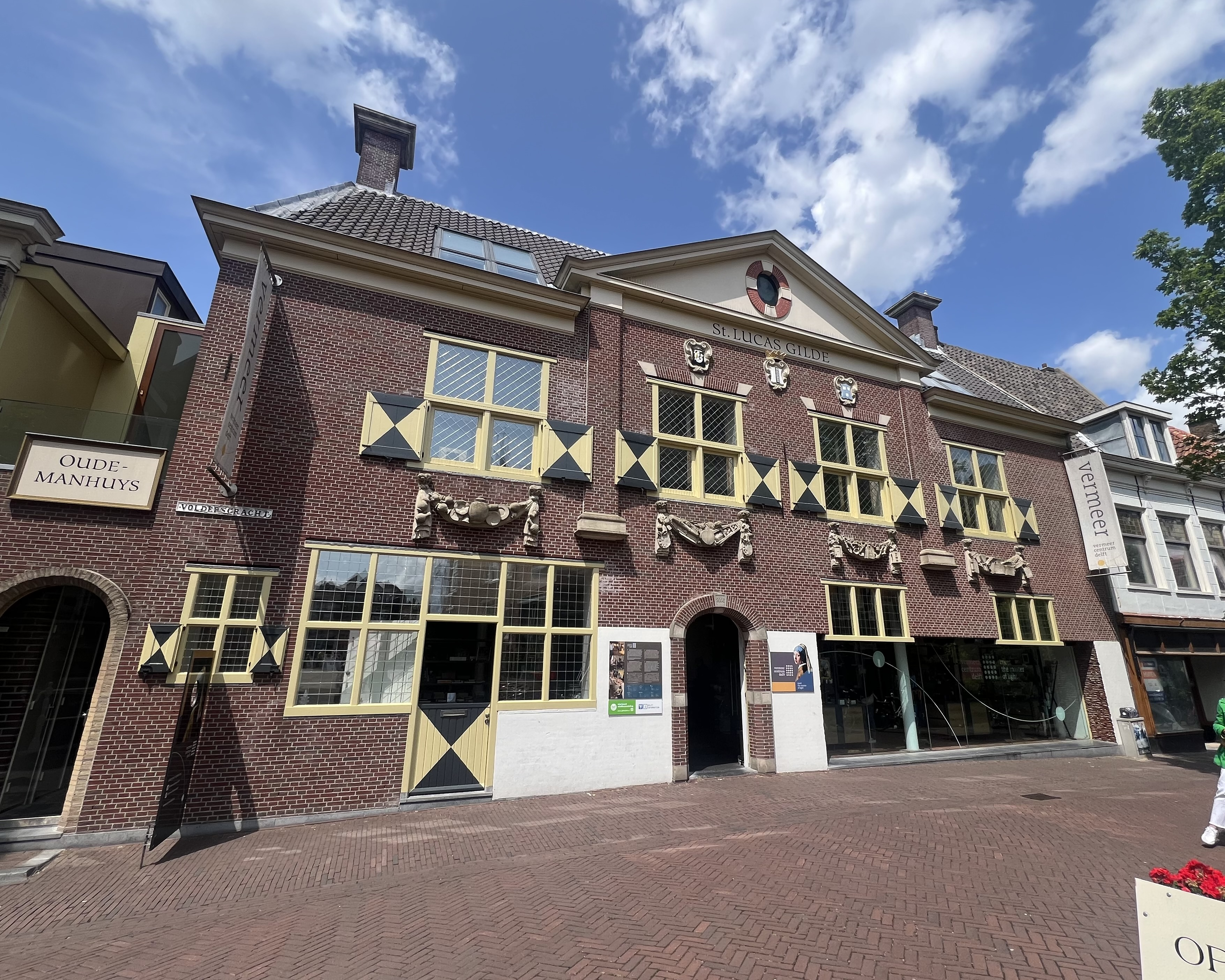
Vermeer Centre in Delft in 2025

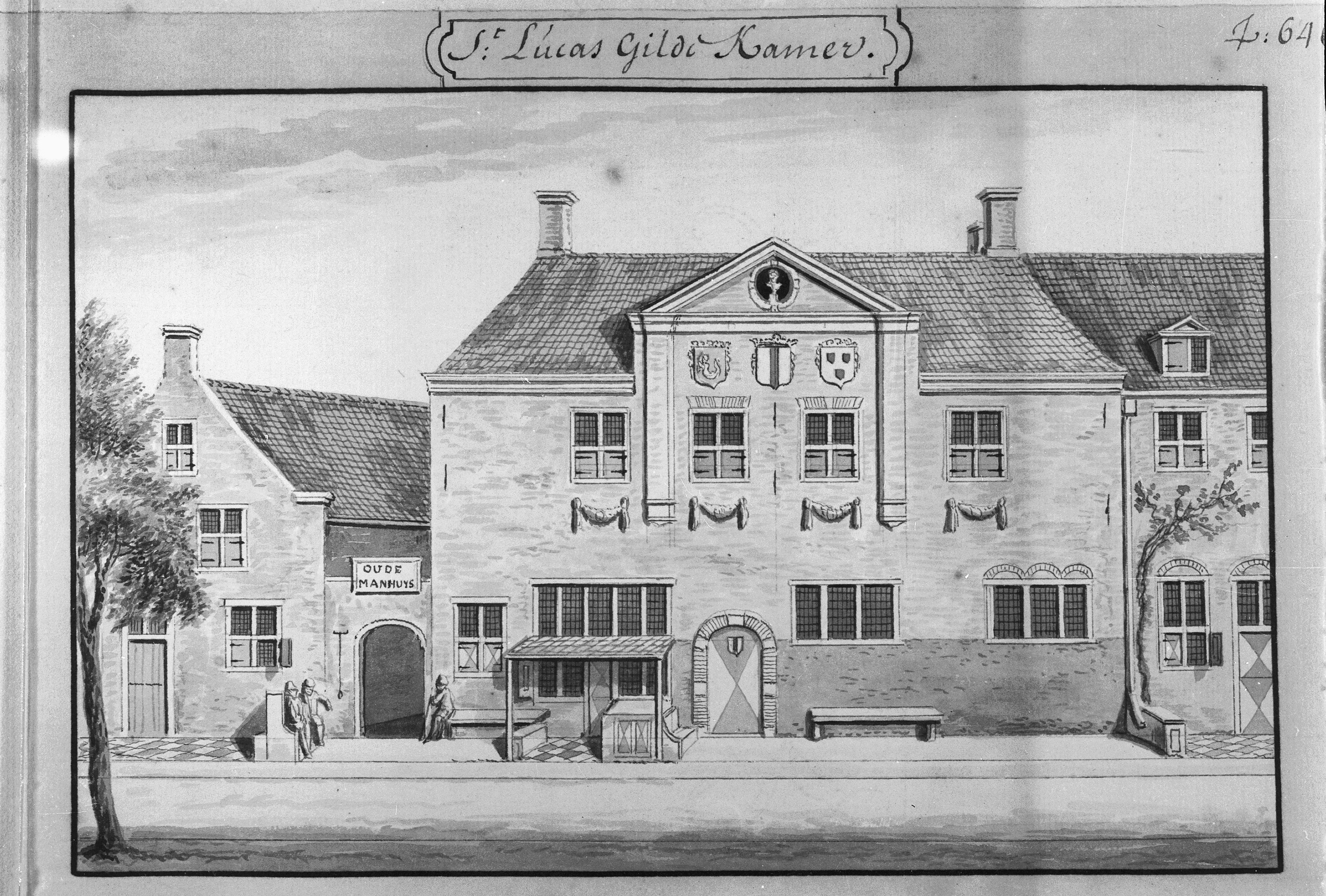
1730s engraving of the original Delft Guild house, by Abraham Rademaker

The Vermeer Centre (Dutch: Vermeer Centrum Delft) is an information center dedicated to the painter Johannes Vermeer and the work of his contemporaries in Delft, the Netherlands.

The building is a rebuilt version of the old local Guild of Saint Luke. The center works with local archeology groups and other heritage organisations to disseminate information about Delft during the lifetime of Vermeer. The center acts as a museum, though technically it does not own the original artifacts on display and therefore has not earned the Dutch label for "Museum". Based on scale copies of known artworks by Vermeer and his contemporaries, multi-media exhibition displays beginning in the basement lead the visitor literally upwards through time during the life of Johannes Vermeer, explaining the work of contemporaries and events that occurred during his lifetime. In the top floor an exhibition on his work methods is set up, with an opportunity for visitor to pose for a picture as Lady Writing a Letter with her Maid.

The ground floor contains a small gift store and book shop.

== See also ==
- Rembrandthuis, a much longer established museum in Amsterdam focused on the painter Rembrandt
