= Ten Great Merchant Guilds =

Influential groups of merchants in Chinese history

The Ten Great Merchant Guilds (simplified Chinese: 十大商帮; traditional Chinese: 十大商幫; pinyin: Shí Dà Shāngbāng) were the variously influential groups of merchants and businessmen in Chinese history. They were:

- Shanxi Merchants (晉商) - also known as Jin merchants
- Huizhou Merchants - based in modern Huangshan, Anhui
- Longyou Merchants (龍游商幫) - based in modern western Zhejiang province
- Ningbo Merchants (寧波商幫)
- Dongting Merchants 洞庭商幫 - based in the Dongting region of modern Suzhou
- Jiangxi Merchants (江西商幫) - also known as the Jiangyou Merchants (江右商幫)
- Guangdong Merchants
- Shaanxi Merchants
- Shandong Merchants
- Fujian (Min) Merchants

== See also ==
- Hong (business)
- Cohong
- Jiao (commercial guild)
- Merchant guilds
