= Nam Pak Hong =

The Nam Pak Hong (Chinese: 南北行), also Nam Pei Hong and Nam Bac Hang (literally, "South-North Trading Association"), was a combination of individual hongs, or trading houses, the traditional form of business organization in China. They represented Chinese merchants who were often associated with overseas trade, both the "Gold Mountain" trade with the United States and Australia, and the older trade in the Nanyang. The association was established in 1868 in Hong Kong by merchants from various dialect groups and its influence quickly expanded.

== See also ==
- Economy of Hong Kong
- Economic history of China
