= Hong (business) =

Major business houses in Canton

A hong (Chinese: 行; pinyin: háng; Jyutping: hong4-2) was a type of Chinese merchant establishment and its associated type of building. Hongs arose in Guangzhou (formerly known as Canton) as intermediaries between Western and Chinese merchants during the 18th and 19th centuries under the Canton System.

== Canton (Guangzhou) ==
The name "hong" (Chinese: 行; pinyin: háng; Jyutping: hong4; lit. 'profession', 'row') originally referred to the row of factories built outside of the city walls of Canton near the Pearl River. The Thirteen Factories were used during the Canton System period to host foreign traders and the products purchased, under the aegis of the cohong. The hongs (or Factories) were usually owned by hong merchants such as Pan Zhencheng (also known as Puankhequa).

The Cantonese hongs changed location several times after fires and became less important after the First Opium War (1839–1842), as Canton lost its monopoly of foreign trade and Hong Kong was ceded to the British as a colony.

== Hong Kong ==
In Hong Kong, the name hong is used to designate major business houses. One of the earliest foreign hongs established there was Jardine Matheson & Co., who bought Lot No. 1 at the first Hong Kong land sale in 1841. In 1843 the same firm established a mainland China headquarters on the Bund in Shanghai, just south of the British Consulate. The building was known as "the Ewo Hong", or "Ewo House", based on the Cantonese pronunciation of the company's Chinese name (怡和行, Cantonese: ji4 wo4 hong4, now 怡和洋行). Jardines took the name from the earlier Ewo hong run by Howqua near Whampoa, Canton.

The term is most often used in reference to colonial Hong Kong companies.

Prior to the establishment of banking institutions other than small foreign bank branches, the three firms that financed most of Hong Kong's economic activities were Jardine Matheson & Co., Dent & Co., and Russell & Company. Most of these firms became multinational corporations with management consisting of largely European expatriates.

By the time of the handover of Hong Kong to China in 1997, many of the hongs had diversified their holdings and shifted their headquarters elsewhere to avoid potential takeover by the Chinese Communist Party.

== Conglomerates of colonial Hong Kong ==
Note: Below are lists of companies that had a predominant effect on Hong Kong's economy at a particular era. Their noteworthiness is debatable. The official names of the era are used.

=== 1843 ===
- 12 large British firms
- Six Indian Parsee companies – including D.M. Rustomjee
- One American company – Augustine Heard and Company

=== 1844 ===
- Jardine Matheson
- Dent & Co.

=== 1850s ===
- Russell & Co – U.S. company founded by Samuel Russell in Canton in 1824 for the opium trade; acquired J & T H Perkins of Boston in 1830, established Hong Kong office in 1850
- Wheelock Marden 1857

=== 1860s ===
- Gilman and Bowman – established by Richard James Gilman as a tea trader in 1840; taken over by Duncan Paterson of Australia 1917 and turned into a privately held company; bought by Inchcape Group in 1969

=== 1870s ===
- Butterfield and Swire
- Adamson Bell and Company - transformed into Dodwell, Carlill & Co. in 1891 by George Benjamin Dodwell; changed name to Dodwell & Co. in 1899; bought by Inchcape Group in 1972
- Hutchison International - founded in 1877 by John Hutchison, now part of Hutchison Whampoa

=== 1880s ===
- The Wharf (Holdings)

=== 1890s ===
- Jebsen & Co.

== See also ==
- Chaebol, South Korea
- Cohong
- Economy of Hong Kong
- English Chartered Trading Companies, England/Britain - including fur trading company Hudson's Bay Company
- Four big families of Hong Kong
- Hang Seng Index
- Jiao (commercial guild)
- Keiretsu, Japan
- Nam Pak Hong
- Old China Trade
- Sogo shosha, Japan
- Ten Great Merchant Guilds
- The Hongkong and Shanghai Banking Corporation
- Zaibatsu, Japan
