= Canton System =

Chinese foreign trade policy (1757–1842)

- Chinese: 一口通商
Transcriptions
Standard Mandarin
- Hanyu Pinyin: Yīkǒu tōngshāng
- Wade–Giles: I1-k'ou3 T'ung1-shang1
Yue: Cantonese
- Jyutping: jat1 hau2 tung1 soeng1

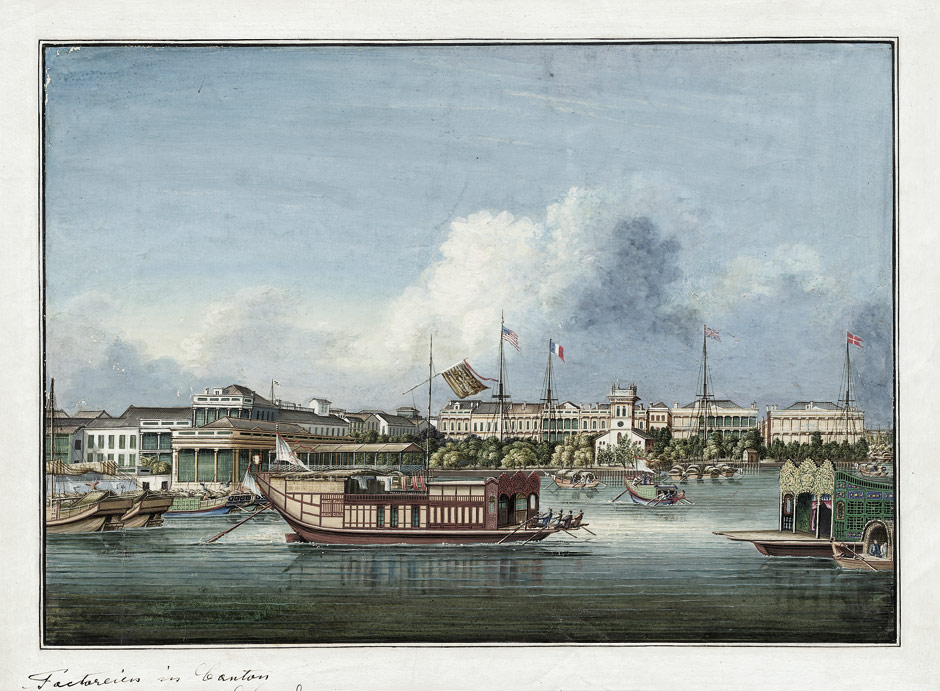
Canton factories c. 1850

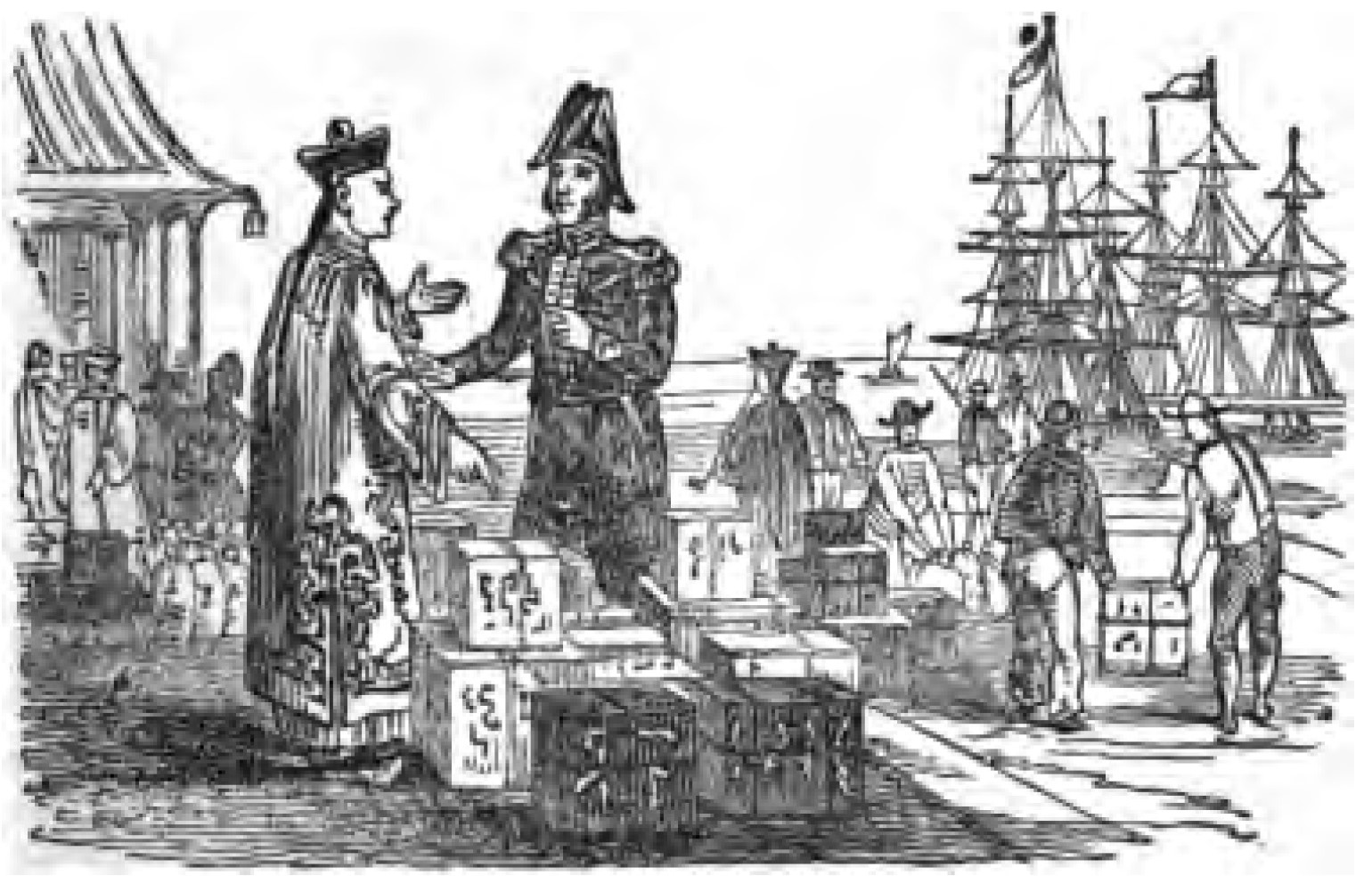
Scene in China (1852, p. Vignette)

The Canton System (1757–1842; Chinese: 一口通商; pinyin: Yīkǒu tōngshāng; Jyutping: jat1 hau2 tung1 soeng1, lit. "single [port] trading relations") served as a means for Qing China to control trade with the West within its own country by focusing all trade on the southern port of Canton (now Guangzhou). The protectionist policy arose in 1757 as a response to a perceived political and commercial threat from abroad on the part of successive Chinese emperors.

From the late seventeenth century onwards, Chinese merchants, known as Hongs (行), managed all trade in the port. Operating from the Thirteen Factories located on the banks of the Pearl River outside Canton, in 1760, by order of the Qing Qianlong Emperor, they became officially sanctioned as a monopoly known as the Cohong. Thereafter Chinese merchants dealing with foreign trade (洋行) (Note: Jyutping: joeng4 hong2; pinyin: yángháng; lit. "overseas traders" or "foreign traders") acted through the Cohong under the supervision of the Guangdong Customs Supervisor (粵海關部監督), (Note: Jyutping: jyut6 hoi2 gwaan1 bou6 gaam1 duk1; pinyin: Yuèhǎi guānbù jiàn dù) informally known as the "Hoppo", and the Governor-general of Guangzhou and Guangxi.

== History ==
=== Origins ===
At the start of his reign, the Kangxi Emperor (r. 1661–1722) faced a number of challenges, not the least of which was to integrate his relatively new dynasty with the Chinese Han majority. The Manchu-led Qing dynasty had only come to power in 1644, replacing the Ming dynasty. Support for the previous rulers remained strong, particularly in the south of the country. Kangxi twice banned all maritime trade for strategic reasons, to prevent any possible waterborne coup attempt. Several rebellions took place, including one led by Ming loyalist Koxinga and separately the Rebellion of the Three Feudatories, which led to the capture of Taiwan in 1683. Once the rebellions had been quelled, in 1684 Kangxi issued an edict:

Now the whole country is unified, everywhere there is peace and quiet, Manchu-Han relations are fully integrated so I command you to go abroad and trade to show the populous and affluent nature of our rule. By imperial decree I open the seas to trade.

Customs stations (海關) (Note: Jyutping: hoi2 gwaan1; pinyin: Hǎiguān) were subsequently opened at Canton, Macau, and Xiangshan County in Guangdong; Fuzhou, Nantai, and Amoy in Fujian; Ningbo and Dinghai County in Zhejiang Province; and Huating County, Chongque, and Shanghai in Jiangsu Province. One year later in 1685, foreign traders received permission to enter Chinese ports.

International cargoes arriving in Canton in 1741
	Great Britain		France	Holland	Sweden	Denmark
	East India; Company	Itinerant traders				
Number of Ships	4	1	2	2	4	1
Tonnage	2,250	350	1,450	1,450	2,600	850
Cannon	112	12	60	64	120	36
Crew	400	100	300	220	510	150
Black Tea (piculs)	7,194		8,000		8,000	5,000
Green Tea (piculs)	6,151		1,450		550	1,400
Raw Silk (piculs)	28		250			
Woven Silk (bales)	11,074		6,000		7,000	7,500
Nankeens	15,699					
Chinaware (chests)	844		600		800	400
Tutenag^{1} (piculs)					1,800	
^{1}An alloy of copper, nickel and zinc						source: Gao (2003)

The Qing Court under Kangxi set up a trading company in Canton in 1686 to deal with Western trade known as the "Foreign Goods Hong". (Note: Jyutping: joeng4 fo3 hang4; pinyin: Yánghuò Háng) This dealt with both imports and exports with sub-offices responsible for taxes and import/export declarations respectively. When a ship arrived or departed, the Chinese merchant involved would visit the Ocean Trading House to pay any taxes due. This set up became the basis for the later Thirteen Factories through which all foreign trade would be conducted.

Although many ports on the coasts of China were open, most Westerners chose to trade at Canton as it is closer to Southeast Asia and it was not profitable to go further north.

In 1704, the Baoshang system was established. This system licensed trade with Western merchants: licences were granted to a number of Chinese merchants as long as they helped to collect duties from the Westerners, successfully aligning trading interests with the government's revenue collection. This was the predecessor for the later Cohong system.

Although he now had the foreign trade situation under control, Kangxi's liberal attitude towards religion led to a clash between Chinese and Christian spiritual authority. After Pope Clement XI issued his 1715 papal bull Ex illa die, which officially condemned Chinese religious practices, Kangxi expelled all missionaries from China except those employed in a technical or scientific advisory capacity by the Qing Court.

=== Implementation of the Cohong ===
In 1745, Kangxi's grandson the Qianlong Emperor ordered his court to implement changes to the Ocean Trading House system. Thereafter a local Chinese merchant stood as guarantor for every foreign trading vessel entering Canton Harbour and took full responsibility for the ship and its crew along with the captain and supercargo. Any tax payments due from a foreign trader were also to be guaranteed by the local merchant. With permission from the authorities, in 1760 Hong merchant Puankhequa and nine other hong specializing in the western trade joined to become the intermediary between the Qing government and the foreign traders. The role of the new body would be to purchase goods on behalf of the foreigners and deduct any taxes and duties payable for imports and exports; at the same time, according to Guangdong customs records (粵海關志), (Note: pinyin: Yuèhǎi guān zhì; Jyutping: jyut6 hoi2 gwaan1 zi3) they established a new harbour authority to deal with tribute from Thailand and handle pay for the troops involved in trade as well as manage domestic maritime trade in the South China Sea. Henceforth, the Cohong possessed imperial authority to levy taxes on the foreign merchants as they saw fit.

=== Flint affair ===
In 1757 the Qianlong Emperor banned all non-Russian ships from the ports of northern China. Russians were however not allowed to use Canton. All customs offices other than the one at Canton were closed. The emperor did this after receiving a petition regarding the presence of armed Western merchant ships all along the coast. The Guangdong Navy, which was subsequently increased in strength, guarded against pirates and kept the Western merchant ships under surveillance.

Thereafter all such commerce was to be conducted via a single port under what became known as the Canton System. During Qianlong's reign Qing foreign trade policies had a political aspect largely based on real or imagined threats from abroad; historian Angela Schottenhammer suggests that although the single port trading policy arose in part from lobbying by officials and Chinese merchants, it was more likely triggered by the activities of Flint in what became known as The Flint Affair (洪任輝事件). Although the foreign merchants knew of the Cohong restriction, they had to balance a breach of etiquette against the risks of seeing their substantial investments in China destroyed by bribery and corruption. Englishman James Flint, a long-term East India Company supercargo and a fluent speaker of Chinese, became the focus of the impetus for change. Flint had been repeatedly warned to remain in Canton during the trading season and not to venture north in search of commercial opportunities. Despite this, back in 1755 Flint, together with Company director Samuel Harrison, sailed north to explore possibilities for trade in Zhejiang. In 1759, he again journeyed north, reaching Tianjin, to file a complaint over corruption amongst the officials in Canton. He had hoped that his criticisms of the current system would usher in a new era of free trade but instead, not only did his plan to open up the ports of Zhejiang fail, the Qing authorities reacted by imposing further restrictions on foreign trade. Worse still, Flint found himself deported to Macau where he was imprisoned between December 1759 and November 1762.

The emperor and his officials became alarmed at this breach of normal protocol and realized that something had to be done to control the situation. The Qing court's previous laxity had effectively allowed a coterie of Chinese merchants and local officials to take over foreign commerce in the southern port according to their own best financial interests. One of the fundamental tenets of traditional Chinese diplomacy prohibited contact with Beijing except in the case of tributary envoys from other states.

The new rules, known as the "Vigilance Towards Foreign Barbarian Regulations" (防範外夷規條) (Note: Jyutping: fong4 faan6 ngoi6 ji4 kwai1 tiu4; pinyin: Fángfàn wàiyí guītiáo) or "Five Counter-Measures Against the Barbarians" (防夷五事) (Note: Jyutping: fong4 ji4 ng5 si6; pinyin: Fáng yí wǔ shì) contained the following provisions:

1. Foreign barbarians are prohibited from staying in Canton over the winter.
2. Foreign barbarians coming to the city must reside in the foreign factories under the supervision and control of the Cohong.
3. Chinese citizens are barred from borrowing capital from foreign barbarians and from employment by them.
4. Foreign barbarians must not hire people to carry messages for them.
5. Inbound foreign barbarian vessels must anchor in the Whampoa Roads and await inspection by the authorities.

These rules did not apply to all Western merchants alike. Russians had nominally had an open trade route into northern China since the signing of the Treaty of Nerchinsk in 1689, although rather than send merchant vessels, in practice they limited their activity to caravan trade sent through Siberia and Kyakhta, on the land border with Outer Mongolia. The Portuguese and Spanish were still allowed to trade both in Canton and in Xiamen, although they rarely exercised the privilege of trading directly in Xiamen. The Portuguese preferred to trade through Chinese intermediaries from Canton via their possessions in Macao and, in fact, they did not maintain a factory in Canton. The Spanish traded chiefly through intermediaries belonging to the vast Chinese colony of Manila, which had extensive trading networks in Canton, in Fujian and in northern China, or through factories in Canton, where they had a presence since 1788. Qianlong's single port restrictions mainly affected British traders, and those of nationalities not protected by other treaties, namely Dutch, French, American, German and Nordic traders.

=== Evaluation ===
The discovery of underground missionary activity in the late 1750s may have contributed to the Emperor's decision to concentrate foreigners in a single port. In his edict to establish the restriction, the Emperor specifically mentioned concerns about the strategic value of the interior regions to foreigners: Chinese government consultants were aware of Western military technological superiority and Westerners' record of having "set out to conquer every land they visited". The Kangxi Emperor, considering the Westerners to be highly successful, intrepid, clever, and profitable, already had concerns early on about the serious omnidirectional Western threat to China, if China ever became weakened. The Canton system did not completely affect Chinese trade with the rest of the world as Chinese merchants, with their large three-masted ocean junks, were heavily involved in global trade. By sailing to and from Siam, Indonesia and Philippines, they were major facilitators of the global trading system; the era was even described by Carl Trocki as a "Chinese century" of global commerce.

Under the system, the Qianlong Emperor restricted trade with foreigners on Chinese soil only for licensed Chinese merchants (Cohongs), while the British government on their part issued a monopoly charter for trade only to the East India Company. This arrangement was not challenged until the 19th century when the idea of free trade was popularized in the West. The concept of restricting trade to a single port was also used in Western countries such as Spain and Portugal. Chinese merchants could also trade freely and legally with Westerners (Spanish and Portuguese) in Xiamen and Macao, or with any country when trade was conducted through ports outside China such as Manila and Batavia. Although shipping was regulated, the Qianlong Emperor's administration was diligent in accommodating the requisites of Western merchants. They hired a growing body of Western assistants for the Customs Office to help manage their fellow countrymen. The order to stay in Macao during the winter was lifted, tax was exempted on food, drink and basic supplies for Western merchants, and protections were granted to Westerners and their property.

=== The First Opium War ===
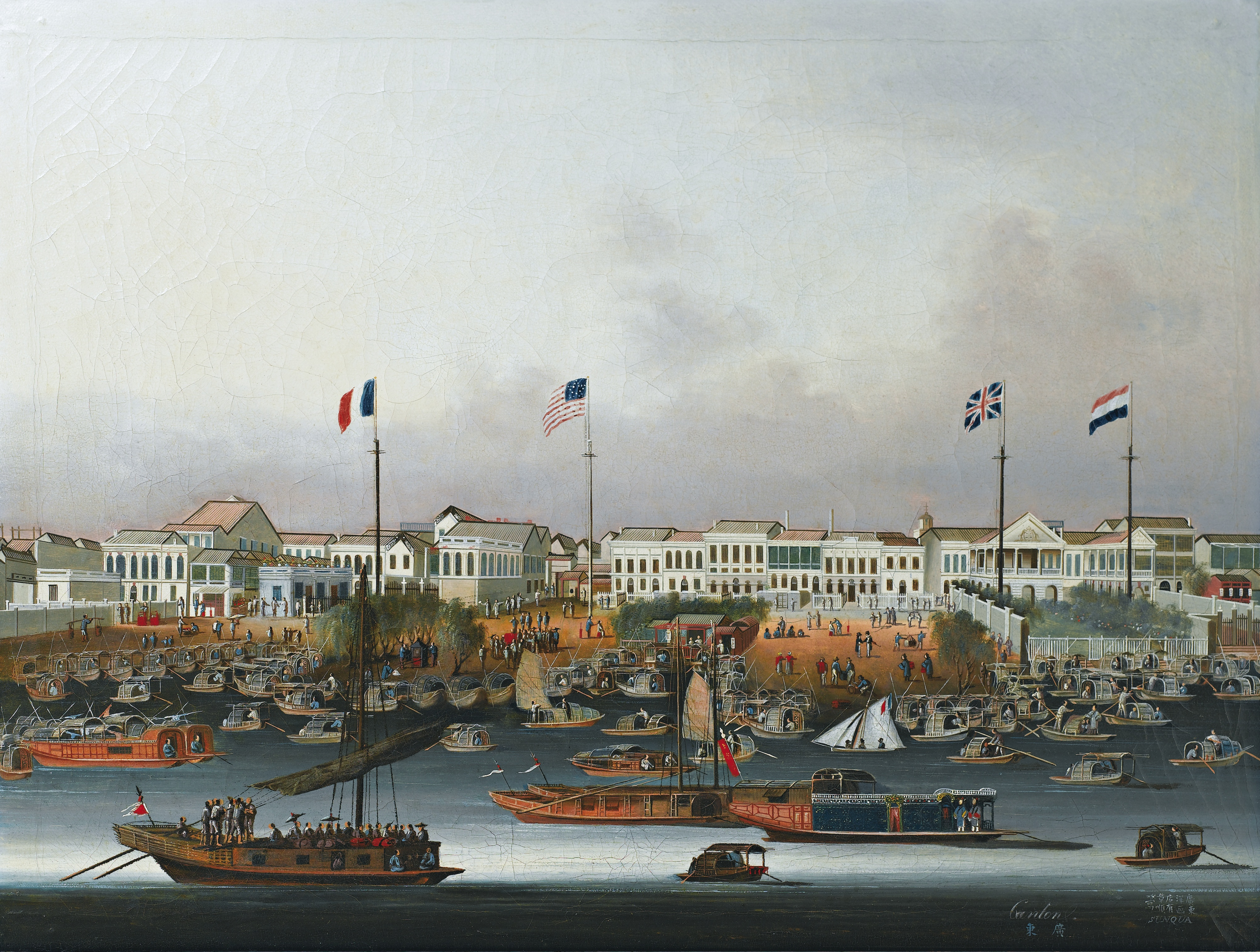
Canton circa 1830 painted by Sunqua. The French, American, British, and Dutch flags can be seen flying.

A seemingly insatiable western demand for tea from China towards the end of the 18th century caused a significant deficit in the British balance of trade. The Chinese had little interest in Western goods and would only accept silver in payment. This spurred the East India Company to sell opium grown on its plantations in India to independent traders, who shipped it on to China to sell in exchange for silver, despite the fact that opium was already illegal in China. China tried to stop the importation of this opium, but the traders persisted. Chinese attempts to regain control led to the First Opium War, when British gunboat diplomacy quickly forced China to sign the treaty of Nanjing that gave Hong Kong to the British along with allowing free trade to British merchants in China. Additionally China was forced to pay reparations for the destroyed opium.

== Abolition ==
Following the signature of the 1842 Treaty of Nanking, British subjects are "allowed to reside, for the purpose of carrying on their mercantile pursuits, without molestation or restraint" at Canton, Shanghai, Amoy (Xiamen), Ningbo and Fuzhou. In addition, Article V of the Treaty specifically abolishes the Canton system, allowing British merchants, and eventually all foreign merchants, to deal with whomever they please in the newly opened ports.

In 1859 work began on a new site for Canton's trade on the reclaimed sandbank of Shameen Island, a short distance west of the former factories; its lots were sold in 1861. By then much of the foreign trade with China had shifted to the by then British colony of Hong Kong (acquired under the Treaty of Nanking), and to the northern ports, with their advantage of proximity to Beijing as well as the Grand Canal and the Yellow River, both vital arteries in the internal trade of Qing China. By 1866, only 18 foreign firms still had offices in Canton, while there were only 60 foreign residents, excluding British Indians and tidewaiters (who boarded boats as part of custom's inspections) employed by Sir Robert Hart's Imperial Maritime Customs Service.

== Legacy ==
The Massachusetts General Hospital, McLean Hospital, the Boston Athenæum, the Bunker Hill Monument, public libraries, and an orphanage were built with the proceeds of opium smuggling.

By the time Hong Kong became a full-fledged British colony, many of the merchants would be led by a newer generation of western hong merchants. Many of these companies would become the backbone of the young Hong Kong economy.

== See also ==
- Century of humiliation
- Economic history of China before 1912
- Old China Trade
- Hongs
- Howqua
- Thirteen Factories
- Wu Tingju

== Notes and references ==
Notes

Bibliography

- Dennys, N. B. (1867). The Treaty Ports of China and Japan: A Complete Guide to the Open Ports of Those Countries, Together with Peking, Yedo, Hongkong and Macao. London: Trubner. p. 138. ISBN 978-1-108-04590-2.
- Dun, Jen Li (Trans.) (1969). China in transition, 1517–1911. New York, Van Nostrand Reinhold, Inc. ISBN 0-442-04778-9.
- Fairbank, J. K.; Têng, S. Y. (1941). "On the Ch'ing Tributary System". Harvard Journal of Asiatic Studies. 6 (2): 135–246. doi:10.2307/2718006. JSTOR 2718006.
- Li, V. H. (1977). Law and Politics in China's Foreign Trade. Asian law series. University of Washington Press. ISBN 978-0-295-80387-6.
- Mantienne, Frédéric (1999). Monseigneur Pigneau de Béhaine (in French). Paris: Editions Eglises d'Asie. ISBN 978-2-914402-20-0.
- Schottenhammer, Angela (2007). The East Asian Maritime World 1400–1800: Its Fabrics of Power and Dynamics of Exchanges. East Asian economic and socio-cultural studies. Harrassowitz. ISBN 978-3-447-05474-4.
- Schottenhammer, Angela (2010). Trading networks in early modern East Asia. Wiesbaden: Harrassowitz Verlag. ISBN 978-3-447-06227-5.
- Stifler, S. R. (1938). "The language of students of the East India Company's Canton factory". Journal of the North China Branch of the Royal Asiatic Society. 69.
- Gao, Shujuan (高淑娟); Feng, Bin (冯斌) (2003). 中日对外经济政策比较史纲: 以封建末期贸易政策为中心 [Comparative Outline of Chinese and Japanese Foreign Policy: Central Trade Policy in the Final Years of the Imperial Era]. Qinghua University Chinese Economic Historiography Series (清华大学中国经济史学丛书) (in Chinese). Qinghua University Publishing. ISBN 978-7-302-07517-2.
- Shurtleff, W.; Aoyagi, A. (2012). History of Soy Sauce (160 CE To 2012). Soyinfo Center. ISBN 9781928914440.
