= Painters' Guild in New Spain =

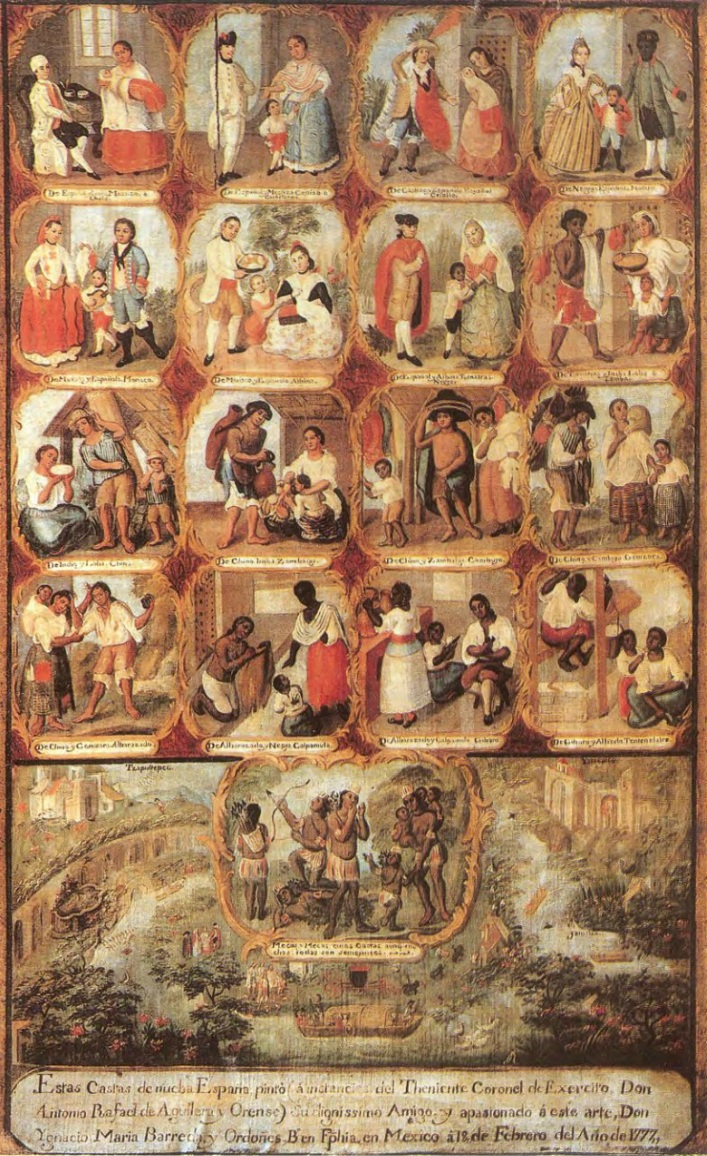
Ignacio María Barreda - Las castas mexicanas

While the Casta system was flourishing in New Spain (Colonial Mexico) (1519–1821),

a painters' guild emerged in order to classify the different ‘races’. The painters' guild in New Spain paralleled the structure, purpose, and mobility of the Casta system they were representing.

== Structure ==
The structure of the guild was hierarchical, similar to the system they were paid to represent. The master would take on an ‘apprentice’ who would work for room and board until he or she was considered skilled enough to become an independent painter. As Moriuchi states "Working within a guild system, Mexican artists frequently copied one another, and several compositions, forms, and themes were repeated among various identified and anonymous artists, establishing basic conventions foundational to any genre" (15). Therefore, despite the multitude of painters responsible for visually representing race in the Casta paintings, the images themselves seem similar enough to belong to a single artist. Change and innovation was highly criticized and the paintings, thus, maintained a common style and portrayal.

== Purpose ==
One of the main reasons that innovation was frowned upon in the Casta painters' guild was due to the very purpose of the Casta system. The system was, in part, created to try and impose an order on a very messy reality – the mixing of ‘races’ between the Spanish, indigenous, and African peoples of New Spain. Therefore, the guild had specific rules for how the representations of races were to be depicted and in what way. The order in the guild therefore promoted the order of the system. Additionally, unskilled artists were required to be tested in order to paint specific pieces. These lesser skilled artists were referred to as ‘Indians’ regardless of their own personal racial identification. This exemplifies how race was used as a categorizing tool that didn't necessarily relate to the reality on the ground.

== Mobility and opportunity ==
The guild also had specific restrictions on who and how an individual could move up in the hierarchy of the guild. Strict tests were required before an individual could move up a position in the guild. However, similarly in the Casta system itself, there was corruption in the guild which allowed individuals to pay for a higher position even if the skill requirements had not been met.
