= Guildhall Museum =

Guildhall Museum can refer any of the Guild halls in England now used as museums, including

- Boston Guildhall
- Carlisle Guildhall
- Leicester Guildhall
- London Guildhall (museum from 1826 to 1974)
- Looe Guildhall
- Rochester Guildhall

It can also refer to Long Island's Guild Hall of East Hampton museum, which was previously known as the Guild Hall Museum.
