= Mary West Niles =

American physician (1854–1933)

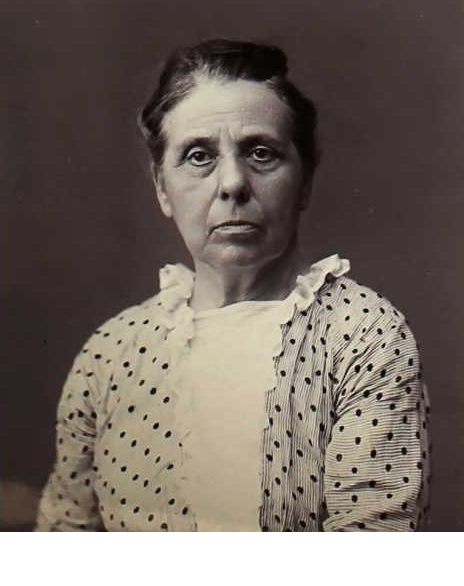
Mary West Niles: Evangelist, American, Medical Missionary (1854-1933)

Mary West Niles (1854 – 1933) was an American physician and missionary. Niles was the first woman missionary physician at the Canton Hospital and opened a school for the blind in China. Niles learned the Cantonese language so she could translate the English Braille system into Cantonese.

== Early life and education ==
=== Background ===
Niles was born on January 20, 1854 in Watertown, Wisconsin to Rev. William Allen Niles and Mary Elizabeth Niles.

Her father was the only son of Rev Benjamin (first pastor of the First Presbyterian Church of Binghamton, N.Y.) and Mahlah Niles, was born in Binghamton, New York, May 29, 1823. He graduated from Williams College in 1847, and Auburn Theological Seminary in 1850, was ordained by the Presbytery of Ithaca, June 22, 1850, and received the degree of D.D from Hamilton College in 1872. He was a "pioneer home missionary" in Wisconsin (1852–59) and also the pastor of the Presbyterian Church of Corning, N.Y. (1859–72), Hornellsville, N.Y. (1872–89), and Trumansburg (1892-96). He married Mary Elizabeth West, also native of Binghamton, in 1850 and had six children.

=== Education ===
In 1875, she graduated from Elmira College, and spent the next three years in New York city teaching in public schools and doing mission work. She started her medical school study in 1878 at the Women's Medical College connected with the New York Infirmary for women and children, and received her M.D degree in 1882. Niles specialized in gynecology and obstetrics and had expected to devote her life to caring for women and children. Elmira College awarded her the degree of A.M in 1882.

=== Personal life ===
Niles never married and had no biological children. She devoted her life to serving the Presbyterian church, and providing health care to women and children.

== Missionary work ==
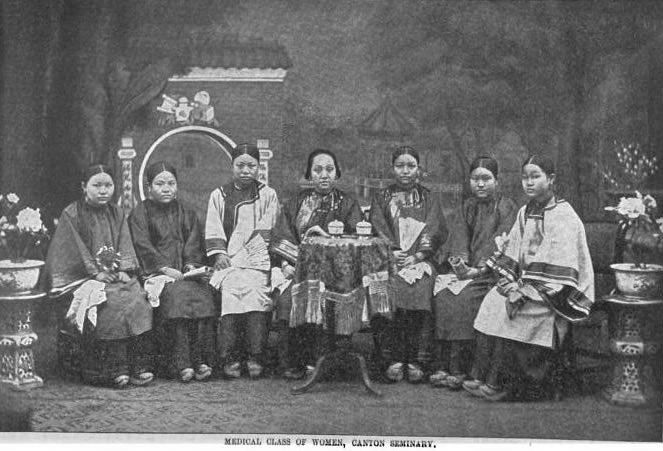
Mary West Niles' Women's Class at Canton Seminary

=== Work in the Canton Hospital ===
The Canton Hospital was founded by Peter Parker in 1835 at Guangzhou, Guangdong, China. Niles, following her commission from the Presbyterian Board of Foreign Missions as a medical missionary in China, joined the hospital on 1882, while John Glasgow Kerr was in charge. On her arrival, October 19, 1882, in Canton, she lived with Harriet Noyes at the True Light Seminary where she started studying the Cantonese dialect and gave some assistance to Kerr in her spare time. Niles started working at the Canton Hospital in 1883 as superintendent of the women's ward when Kerr was forced to retreat to Hong Kong for a short time.

=== Collaboration with other American doctors ===
She worked with several other pioneer American missionary physicians to improve the quality of life at Canton. She was in charge of the Canton Hospital with doctors J. C. Thomson and Wales while Kerr was away in 1883. She also trained and accommodated Mary Hannah Fulton on her arrival to the Canton Hospital in 1884. Niles, by working hand in hand with Kerr and other American doctors, played a significant role in the campaign against the Bubonic plague in 1894 by being the first to identify the outbreak of the plague and speculate about its causes.

=== Work as pioneer female missionary physician ===
The female patients appreciated the advantage of having a physician of their own sex to whom they could state their problems. This was highly important for the hospital because many uneducated Chinese women chose to endure the suffering rather than be treated by male physicians. Four women delivered their babies at the hospital in 1883, and Niles attended three of them. Due to her excellent accomplishments, Thomson recommended that Niles be appointed lady physician to the hospital at a meeting of the Canton Medical Missionary Society on January 1, 1885. The medical society, convinced of the suitability of the proposal, appointed Niles as a formal doctor in charge of women and child patients at the hospital.

By 1889 it was ascertained that Niles was doing a great deal of good in her visits to the homes. Her activities were described in the 1890 annual report:

She has performed 683 surgical operations and 164 patients have been visited in their homes, 275 calls having been made. She was thus reached many firesides of the poor, and also of the wealthy and influential [including the wife of the provincial governor] always carrying the gospel message."

The hospital reports showed six calls in 1884, thirteen in 1885, and 162 cases in 1894. By 1884, Niles's practice with families had become one of the most important parts of the work of the medical society and the hospital. In 1896, while Kerr and his assistants paid 145 visits to homes in which men were treated, Dr. Niles visited 508 patients, half of whom were birthing babies.

== Mingxin School (1889–1932) ==
Blind and deaf people in China normally were not cared for as a separate class of the destitute. The local governments, generous societies, and charitable individuals did not have any education or remedy programs for people with physical or mental disabilities. Niles identified this miserable situation, and her interest for the blind began in 1889 when a little waif of three years was picked up from an ash heap and brought to the hospital for treatment. The school for the blind began when Niles decided to keep that little girl and four other blind girls.

Niles, determined to provide a place to care for these blind girls, wrote in 1892 to the secretary of the Presbyterian Board of Foreign Missions to apply for assistance. However, because Rev. Dr. William Speer's reply was unenthusiastic, she wrote an article, "The Blind Girls of Canton," to the Woman's Work for Woman journal, which touched the hearts of many sponsors in America. Through appeals by many home churches, the Board finally approved Mary Nile's school for the Blind girls in 1894, and the school was formally founded in 1896. In 1897, Niles renamed the school as Mingxin School (school of Clear Heart or Understanding Heart), with a mission of adopting blind children and teaching life skills so that they would earn their living by themselves and make an impact in their community.

At the beginning of the school, all the funds came from Niles' fundraising assisted by her friends in America. Later, local government officials, merchants, and businessmen were the major donors for the expansion of the school. To solve financial problems, the school inaugurated a fund-raising drive in 1929 with the target of 4,000 yuan and had successfully collected an endowment of 10,000 yuan by 1930. Niles carried the responsibility of the school until her retirement in July 1928 after forty-six years of service in China, best known through her work for the blind.

== Legacy ==
Niles had taken charge of the women's department of the Canton hospital for fifteen years. Niles contributed to the success of the hospital by increasing the number of patients and students at the Canton Hospital. She taught and took charge of the obstetric department at the Hackett Medical College, founded by Fulton, and its hospital until in 1923 when she devoted herself entirely to the School for the Blind. She also held several positions, such as the trustee of the Refuge for the Insane; a hospital for mentally ill patients founded by Dr. Kerr, and other positions in connection with missionary work in Canton.

She gave considerable time to the work of translation and revision of medical books. The most important of these were David James Evan's Obstetrics: A Manual for Students and Practitioners and John Kerr's Practice of Medicine.

She founded the first school for the blind in South China. The school she found had a big impact on Cantonese. The Mingxin School for the Blind was so successful that the Cantonese government started sending blind children to school with government financial support, regarding it as a part of the welfare system in the society. Niles also created the first Braille writing system in the Cantonese language.

Although she knew very little about education for the blind, since she specialized in obstetrics and gynaecology, she decided to translate Chinese characters into Braille by learning it first herself in order to translate it into Chinese. She made a monumental achievement when she translated the Braille writing system into the Cantonese language, for which Mary Nile's alma mater, the Elmira College, awarded her a degree of L.L.D in 1917.

== Death ==
Niles died on January 18, 1933, in California, where she lived with her brother, Rev. John S. Niles. She died of pneumonia at the age of 78. Her colleagues paid her this tribute: "Into dark places, full of pain and suffering she went, taking light and relief and beauty, and most of all, a loving heart."
