= William Warder Cadbury =

American physician, researcher, author, and medical missionary (1877–1959)

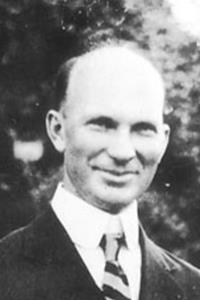
- Born: October 15, 1877; Philadelphia, Pennsylvania, US
- Died: October 15, 1959 (aged 82)
- Other name: 嘉惠霖
- Education: B.A., M.A. Haverford College, PhD University of Pennsylvania
- Occupations: Physician, professor, medical missionary, writer
- Notable work: At the Point of a Lancet. One Hundred Years of the Canton Hospital, 1835-1935
- Spouses: Sarah Imbree Manatt (m. 1911; died 1912); Catharine Balderston Jones (m. 1917–1959)
- Children: 3
- Family: Cadbury family
- Awards: Top 10 Most Famous Alumni in 1935 for the University of Pennsylvania

William Warder Cadbury (Chinese name: 嘉惠霖; 1877 – October 15, 1959) was an American physician, professor, researcher, author, and medical missionary. After graduating from the University of Pennsylvania's Medical School, he traveled to Canton (Guangzhou), China, where he eventually became the most well-known internal medicine doctor in the region during the time period of the Republic of China. At Canton Hospital, he served as a doctor, professor, writer, and eventually superintendent multiple times. In his 40 years working in Canton (1909-1949), he put forward relentless efforts to improve the Canton Hospital and nearby areas in Canton, bettering the health of many thousands of Canton people. In 1935, he published a detailed book on the history of the hospital, called At the Point of a Lancet." One Hundred Years of the Canton Hospital, 1835-1935, which earned him recognition as the top 10 famous University of Pennsylvania Alumni for 1935.

== Early life and education ==
W.W. Cadbury was born in 1877 in Philadelphia, Pennsylvania. Some say his birth date is October 15, but another source says his birth date is unknown. He was the son of Joel and Anna Kaighn Cadbury and a birthright member of the Philadelphia Monthly Meeting for the Western District (now called the Central Philadelphia Monthly Meeting). W. W. Cadbury is distantly related to John Cadbury, founder of Cadbury, the chocolate company.

He graduated from the William Penn Charter School in 1894. In 1898, he graduated from Haverford College with a B.A. and then went on to get an M.A. from Haverford in 1899. In the 1900 US Census, at age 22, he was listed as a "medical student" under his family's name. He graduated from the Medical School at the University of Pennsylvania in 1902. From 1903 to 1905, he was a resident physician at Pennsylvania Hospital in Philadelphia. Afterwards, he went to Vienna for graduate school and then returned to the University of Pennsylvania to teach pathology and pharmacology. He worked as a pathologist at St. Mary's Hospital from 1906 to 1909.

== Family and personal life in China ==
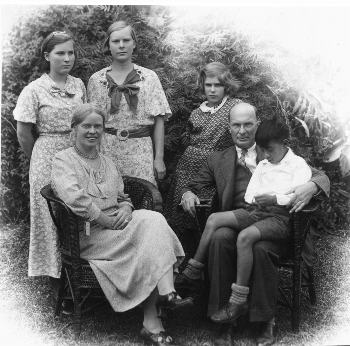
Catharine Jones and William Warder Cadbury and their three daughters and adopted son James

In 1911, Cadbury married Sarah Imbree Manatt, who died shortly after in 1912. Then, in 1917, he married Catharine Balderston Jones, who changed her name to Catharine Jones Cadbury. They had three daughters, Jane B. Cadbury, Emma Cadbury, and Catharine C. Cadbury.

While in Canton, Cadbury and his family lived in the William Penn Lodge. This home was gifted to him by the University of Pennsylvania's Christian Association. Historical records at Sun Yat-sen University and Yale University have images of the home, which still stands today (image can be found here). He created an orchid garden at this residence.

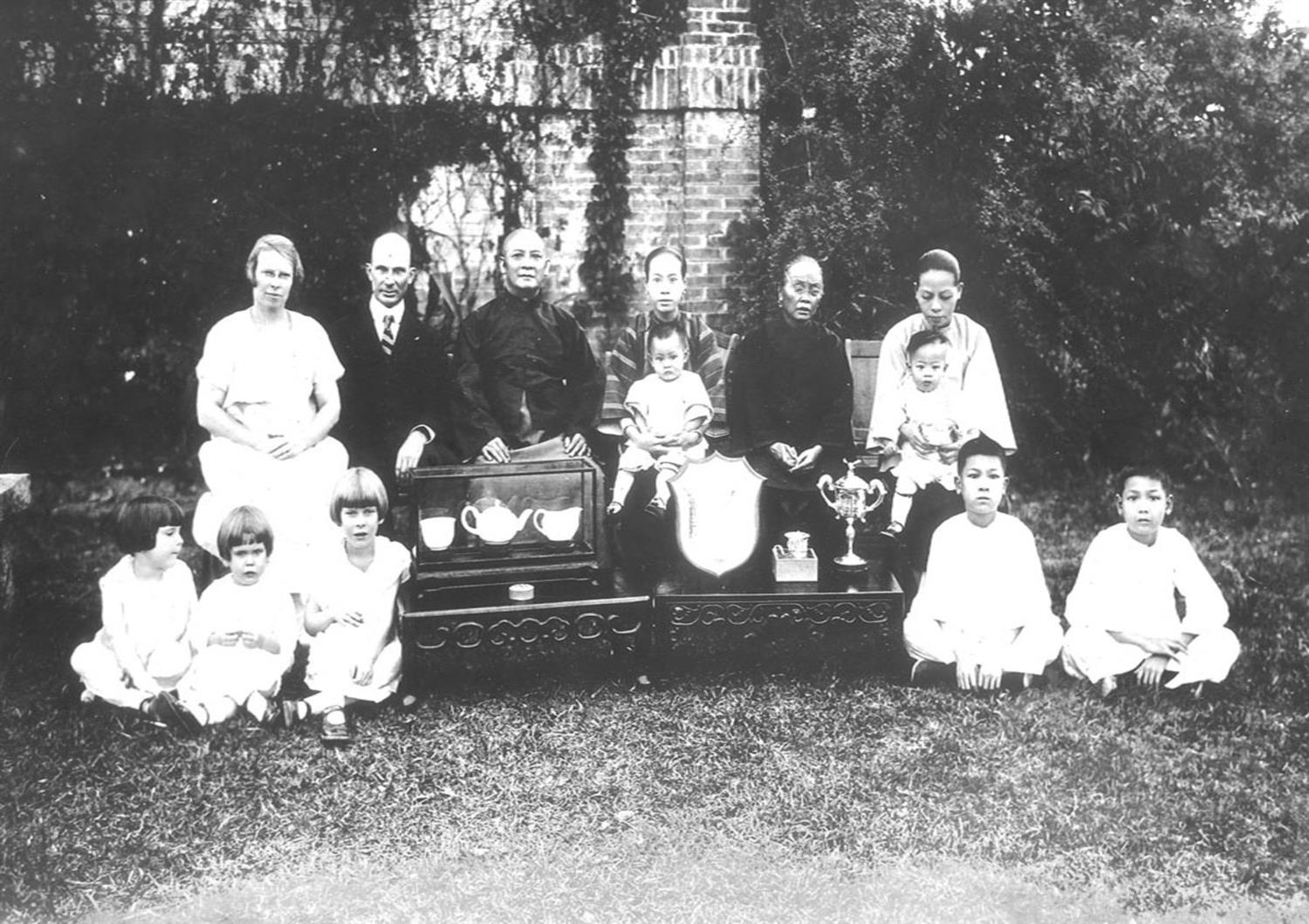
Families of Dr. Cadbury and Gen. Lei Fuk Lam

Around 1924, Cadbury adopted the young son of Kuomintang General Lei Fuk-lam. General Lei wanted his son to grow up in a Christian and American environment. The young son, named James Cadbury Lei (李業?, Lei Ip Nung). Lei became a part of the family, and in return, General Lei contributed funds to construct a small hospital near Canton on Honam Island.

== Missionary journey ==
=== Calling ===
While studying to become a doctor at the University of Pennsylvania, W.W. Cadbury was inspired to work in China by a past graduate of Penn's Medical School, Andrew Patton Happer, who had raised money to establish Canton Christian College in 1888. Happer was inspired to work in China after hearing a lecture by Peter Parker, the founder of the hospital in which W.W. Cadbury would work for much of his life: Canton Hospital.

In 1909, as a member of the University of Pennsylvania Christian Association, Cadbury traveled to Canton, China, by ship to work at the University Medical School. This school was associated with Canton Christian College (later renamed Lingnan University in 1927) and managed by the board of the Christian Association of the University of Pennsylvania. He had chosen to work in a location in China removed from visible poverty. The Society of Friends in Philadelphia and the Philadelphia Yearly Meeting supported his work. The Cadbury Fund was created to assist him: it raised $2,000 annually to subsidize his missionary work.

Cadbury believed he had a duty to bring Western Medicine to China and to help the people of China. He revealed this feeling of duty in a 1911 letter to the editor of a medical journal. He referenced how European doctors dedicated their lives to developing medicine in the American colonies, and thus he believed that American doctors had the duty to do the same for the people of China. He said:

"Can we, who have reaped what they have sowed, do better than follow their example and help the men in this great land of China to realize their ideals of establishing schools of medicine modeled after the institutions of Europe and America?"

=== Canton Hospital & Lingnan University ===
==== Professor and Doctor ====
Cadbury started his work in Canton as a teacher at the University Medical School (part of Canton Christian College) and as a physician (an internist specifically) at Canton Hospital. He was welcomed by the Chinese, as they viewed Canton Christians like Cadbury as people who came to help, not disturb.

When he first arrived, he was one of the three American teachers at the school. Since "Cadbury" was difficult to translate, his students called him a name that together meant "belief, elegance, and selfless" (3 characters: 嘉惠霖 Jiā Huìlín). Having studied Chinese, he was able to communicate with students, patients, and colleagues in Chinese. Historical records today have pictures of him and his students in 1911.

In the same 1911 letter to the editor (mentioned in the above section), he shared the progress the school has made and plans for growth. At the time, he and three other physicians were in charge of the medical school. He and his colleagues were teaching classes on anatomy, physics, ophthalmology, histology, and more. In 1912, while teaching, Cadbury met Sun Yat-sen. Sun Yat-sen had previously studied medicine at Canton Hospital under John G. Kerr, and like the other foreign teachers at Canton Christian College, Cadbury supported Sun Yat-sen's ideology and political views. By 1913, Cadbury had seen his students gain so much knowledge and experience at the school, and he proudly claimed that they were "well-educated young men of fine Christian character" ready to "do their share in the upbuilding of the great Chinese nation." The same year, he also became a teacher at Gongyi Medical School (廣東公醫醫學專門學校), which had reached out to the Canton government for help.

Cadbury was also one of the few doctors known to rehabilitate both the mind and the body of his patients. Genuinely concerned for the wellbeing of his patients, he was known to check on them and wear his stethoscope at all times. Those around him observed that he was a very knowledgeable, highly skilled, and effective doctor. Over the years, he became the most well-known internist in Canton. He tried to emulate William Osler, who was a famous internist in the 1800s. In 1913, he was named the principal doctor for Canton Hospital. Then, in 1914, he joined the specialized medical staff of Canton Hospital.

He had come to Canton with hope and a vision to greatly improve the hospital. The conditions of the hospital, medical supplies, and health environment weren't nearly as developed as those in the USA. In 1913, he and three other doctors donated money to the Canton Medical Missionary Society to further improve the hospital. Thus, in addition to being involved in the hospital's internal medicine department, he helped establish a lab for pathology research and ran a rehabilitation center in the college. As he expanded his endeavors and philanthropic work, he continued serving as a physician and researcher at Canton Hospital.

==== Leadership in the hospital ====
As Cadbury continued to be an internal medicine doctor at Canton Hospital, he assumed important leadership roles. In 1917, Cadbury was nominated as a chief physician, taking on the role of organizing and leading the other doctors.

Then, in 1930, he was appointed superintendent of Canton Hospital by the Lingnan University Board. Soon afterward, Lingnan University assumed control over Canton Hospital and renamed it Sun Yat-sen Memorial Hospital (still referred to as "Canton Hospital" for the rest of the article). In September 1932, the hospital at Lingnan University and its outpatient clinic were transferred to this hospital, which Cadbury headed.

He served as a superintendent of Canton Hospital multiple times. In late 1938, during which the Japanese had begun attacking Canton as part of the Second Sino-Japanese War, he became a superintendent so that the hospital would be under foreign control; that way, it would be protected from Japanese forces. Fortunately, Canton Hospital and Lingnan University weren't greatly affected by these attacks. He ran the hospital at this time, which continued to help people with both medical treatment and spiritual guidance.

==== Religion ====
Cadbury's Quakerism influenced his missionary efforts in Canton. In an article for The Friend, he said he had gone to Canton in order to "institute in Canton instruction in medical science according to the practice of modern civilization, and incidentally the promotion of Christianity, as way may open." As early as 1910, he included religious promotion in his work. For example, he taught a few classes on religion, such as a course on Comparative Religion for Lingnan University students. Additionally, he and his wife held worship services in their home and even exposed Christianity in the local villages. However, he didn't forcefully impose his religion on those he treated.

In 1914, the University of Pennsylvania Christian Association ended its affiliation with Canton Christian College after being unable to establish an official religion. Cadbury, however, stayed, emphasizing service over religious doctrine. He framed religion in the perspective that he and his students, in the name of Christ, should do good and better the world. Under his influence, many of the students became Protestants, but he never mentioned if they were Quakers specifically.

==== Work as a researcher ====
In the same 1911 letter, Cadbury spoke of the exciting opportunity to conduct "original research in a tropical city like Canton." This excitement translated to his work. In the pathology lab that he had helped establish, he conducted research on the various epidemics present in Canton. He accumulated research by doing urine analysis, blood analysis (white blood cells), and even stool analysis of afflicted patients. He measured their glucose and protein levels as well.

Starting in 1918, Cadbury treated lepers, who were outpatients in the Canton Hospital leprosy clinic, for one year. The Canton Hospital was the first to have an organized leprosy clinic in China. He injected these patients with a mixture of chaulmoogra oil, resorcin, and camphorated oil. Then, he reported the results in The China Medical Journal in 1920. He wrote:

"We must state that the various remedies, as outlined above, while in most cases of leprosy, they have definite therapeutic value, yet unless the patients are cared for in a sanatorium, given proper food, together with baths and attention to personal hygiene, a complete cure can hardly be looked for."

In 1926, Cadbury tackled the widespread issue of Chinese children not knowing their birth dates. He collected information from 1013 Cantonese children. His calculations to estimate the ages of these children revealed an understanding of the customs of the Canton people. For example, he learned that most of the children claimed they were born in August, September, and October, most likely due to the tradition that Canton merchants were gone for most of the year except around Chinese New Year.

==== Chinese-US relations ====
Cadbury always emphasized that Canton Christian College was entirely a Chinese institution just receiving aid from foreigners. To better the hospital, he aimed to bring Western medicine and modern hospital guidelines and to maintain a healthy relationship between Western and Chinese doctors. He didn't want to impose the Western way of thought or control on the school or hospital unilaterally. When he returned to the USA for furloughs, he always tried to learn more, buy new equipment and instruments, and buy new medical journals. He also urged doctors to work at Canton Hospital and become missionaries.

When resentment towards Westerners spread in the 1920s, he and the hospital followed Chinese law, and they were able to continue work. During this backlash, he stepped down from his role as chief physician. In 1926, the Hospital closed due to concerns for the safety of foreign workers, but Cadbury urged its reopening. Many saw him to be a unifying force for missionaries in Canton. Though his home was luxurious compared to his students, they didn't feel upset since his home was open to them for Bible sessions and worship services.

When the Japanese began attacking Canton in the late 1930s, Cadbury, as a Quaker (and therefore, a pacifist) at first felt conflicted about supporting China's fighting in the war. However, he knew this was necessary for China to defend itself against Japan and to prevent as many deaths of innocent people as possible. When discovering that the USA was one of the largest arms suppliers to Japan, he urged the USA to support the Chinese in "their fight for freedom," and not Japan. One of his associates even said, "It seems as though you were just like one of us Chinese." However, after the war, his support for the Nationalists of China wavered. This is because though he worked to rally the support of Americans for the Canton people, the Chinese (Nationalist) government gave very limited help to them.

=== Personal philanthropy ===
==== Henan Hospital ====
Cadbury was actively involved in the Lingnan community church and often took medical trips to the countryside. After receiving $13,000, $10,000 of which came from a general named Li Fulin, he worked on the construction of a new hospital in the area. This hospital, Henan Hospital, would treat villagers in the rural areas near Lingnan University. The hospital opened on April 21, 1925, with Cadbury, Dr. H.P. Nottage, two Chinese physicians, and four Chinese nurses as the staff.

==== Outreach in local villages ====
Cadbury established clinics in nearby villages in south Canton. The trips he made to these villages allowed him to understand the limited healthcare outside of Lingnan University. For example, he found a young woman with mental illness tied to a chair; her family couldn't afford treatment for her. Cadbury somehow found the funds to send her to John Kerr's Refuge for the Insane, and her health was soon restored.

Over the years, he consistently reached out to help the children and to help the adults help themselves. For example, during the time period of Japanese aggression in the area, he and his wife Catharine cared for children who had lost their families and homes by bringing them to Lingnan Orphanage and the nearby Industrial School to learn.

He also spread a "Christian message of understanding" in the villages. In his view, conversion was a side benefit instead of a necessary action to reduce suffering. He and his wife sometimes traveled to these villages to teach Sunday School. Since Cadbury knew his medical work wouldn't allow him to put his full efforts into spreading religion in the villages, he asked a Chinese evangelist, Mr. Wong Kom To, to help. He served as a link between Cadbury and the villagers.

=== Publications ===
==== Articles and journals ====
Over his lifetime, Cadbury authored 150 medical articles and 230 articles on religion and other topics. He had written Haverford College papers on medicine and religion, articles for The Friend, American Friend, and Friends Intelligencer, and reports on diseases, religion, and statistics on patients at Canton College/Hospital. During the war between China and Japan, he wrote articles as part of the Canton Committee for Justice to China, urging Americans to support the Chinese and Chiang Kai-shek.

From May 1912 to late 1915, Cadbury was the editor of The Chinese Medical Journal (Zhonghua yi bao), a bi-monthly journal consisting of scientific papers, articles on government policy, reports, and more. While he was editor, the journal was published under his name. It eventually merged with another journal to become Chinese Medical Journal.

==== Book: At the Point of a Lancet ====
In 1935, Cadbury published a book called At the Point of a Lancet; One Hundred Years of the Canton Hospital, 1835-1935. Arguably the first book on Western medicine in China, it was published by the Kelly & Walsh Company in Shanghai. With the help of his niece Mary Hoxie Jones, he wrote about the founding of Canton Hospital by Dr. Peter Parker and Dr. John Kerr in 1835 and the work accomplished by medical missionaries in this hospital over one hundred years. The book covers the history of the hospital and the positive impact it had on two million ill people. As a result of publishing this book, he was chosen as one of the top 10 most famous University of Pennsylvania Alumni for the year 1935.

To write the book, in his spare time, he collected a lot of information on Canton Hospital, scouring newspapers, books, journals published by the hospital, and annual reports written by the Canton Medical Missionary Society. He looked at every single report, which included all the names of those employed at the hospital, names of all the patients, what diseases they had, what surgeries took place, income and expense sheets, donations to the hospital, and more. In both China and the USA, he searched for and interviewed previous staff of the hospital and graduates of the University Medical School. Part of the inspiration for writing the book came from his idol William Osler, who was both an internist and writer.

Cadbury's book is filled with extremely detailed accounts of the work done by the hospital staff and missionaries. For example, he included the names of the first Western medicine doctors who worked in the hospital, as well as expressed the viewpoints of American and English doctors who worked in China. However, the book focuses more on the history of Canton Hospital than the social and political impact on the Chinese people.

=== Other leadership positions and work with aid organizations ===
Cadbury helped procure and distribute relief supplies. He served as vice-president of the Chinese Medical Association from 1935 to 1937, and as Canton chairman of the International Red Cross from 1938 to 1941. As the Canton chairman, he unified and organized efforts for relief work during the Chinese-Japanese War. He used his position as a superintendent of Canton Hospital to access Western medical supplies that were to be used to help the Canton people.

He was also involved in Direct China Relief Incorporated, Kwangtung International Relief Committee, Canton Committee for Justice to China, and the China Medical Missionary Association.

=== Return ===
He lived in China during an extremely tumultuous time in history. In February 1943, after the United States and Japan declared war, Cadbury and his wife Catharine were arrested and interned by the Japanese in a camp in Canton. They were finally released after 8 months. They returned to Philadelphia for the rest of World War II. Soon after the war ended, he returned to China and continued work in Canton, helping relief efforts with the Kwangtung International Relief Committee.

When he retired in 1948, he was given the title of Professor Emeritus of Medicine. He returned to the USA with his wife in 1949, apparently because the Communist government forced them out of China. Though he left at a time when the future of China and Canton was unclear, he was hopeful when he thought about the children, believing that they could one day live in a flourishing Canton.

For the rest of his life, from 1949 to 1959, William lived at his home in Moorestown, New Jersey. On October 15, 1959, he died in Philadelphia, Pennsylvania.

== Legacy ==
During his forty years as a medical missionary, Cadbury served as a doctor, teacher, and religious missionary in Canton. He was involved in the development of Canton Hospital and contributed to its operations. Historical sources attribute to him a role in the hospital's continued operation and development.

His lasting impact in Canton is most obviously be seen by his contribution to the Canton Hospital and the University Medical School. He also gave valuable information on public health in Canton. For example, the Canton Health Department listened to his suggestion that "acute gastroenteritis and dysentery should be placed among the most important causes of death." His book At the Point of the Lancet has also contributed to the study of missionary work. Since its publication, it has been heavily referenced for research by those studying Chinese-Western medical history, Christian History in China, and the history of foreign influences on China.

During his time at Canton, he developed and nurtured a positive relationship between the Westerners and the Chinese. The perspective he shared and practiced was that a foreigner's ways cannot survive in China unless they adapt to the Chinese customs and culture. Using the simile of a tree, he said that foreigners need to adapt to Chinese soil in order to thrive with the tree of China. Chinese and Western doctors admired and shared in his efforts to attain a healthy balance between Chinese and foreign influences.

As a medical missionary, Cadbury cared greatly for his patients. A saying he tightly adhered to was: "Doctors cannot leave their patients, just like farmers cannot leave their land.” His dedication to helping his patients - and the Canton people on a larger scale - showed in his philanthropic endeavors. Even during his breaks in the USA, he urged other doctors and specialists to become missionaries and help the disadvantaged in China. In a 1925 speech in the USA, he said:

"Don't waste time in America; help human beings dying without a doctor, without medicine. I hope you will ask many to pray for those unhappy people."

Though few people remember the name "William Warder Cadbury," his efforts undeniably led to the improvement of the health of thousands in Canton, China during the years of the Republic of China.
