= Thomas Richardson Colledge =

British surgeon (1797–1879)

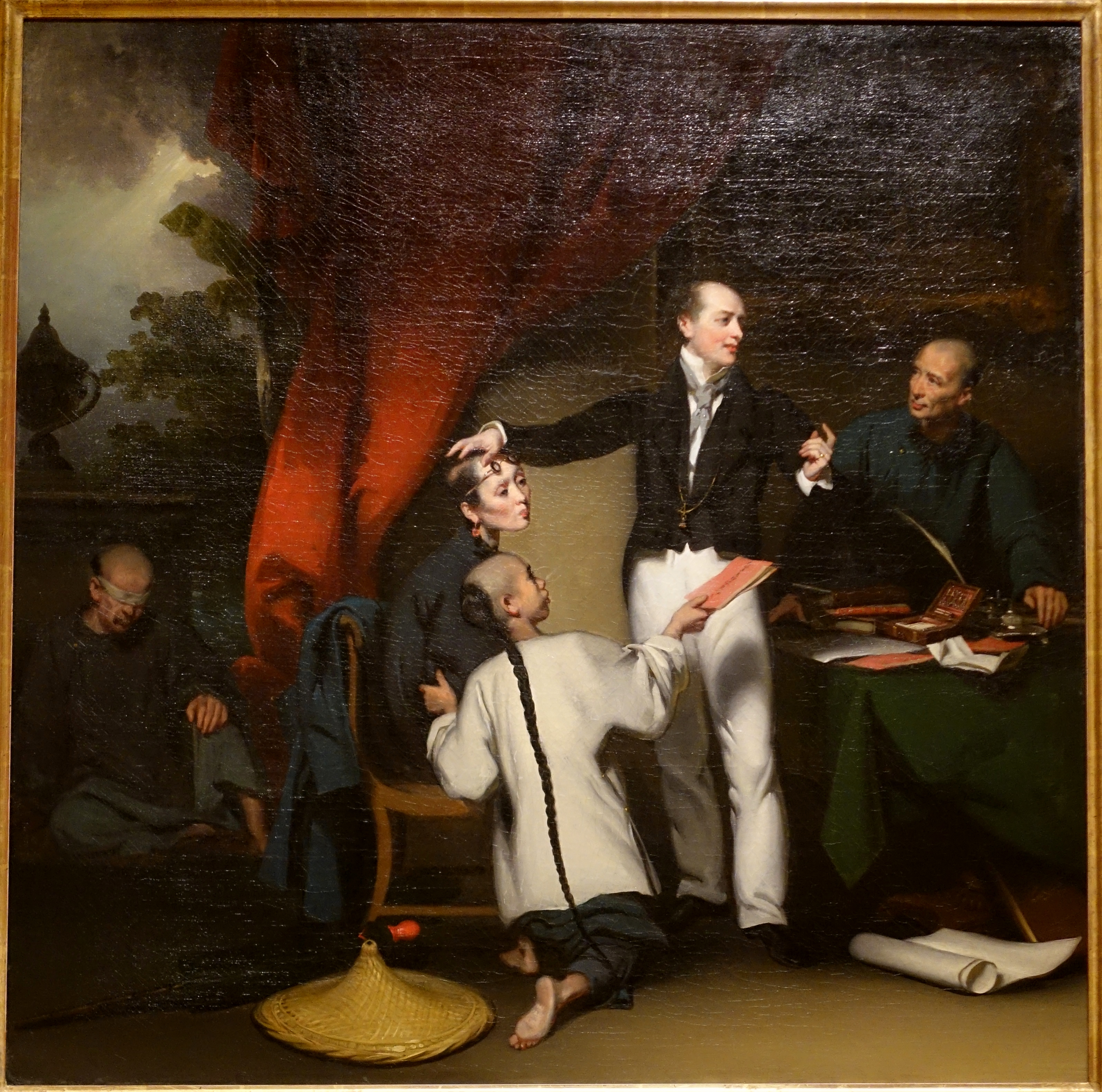
Dr. Colledge after completing an ophthalmic operation on a Chinese woman (painted by George Chinnery)

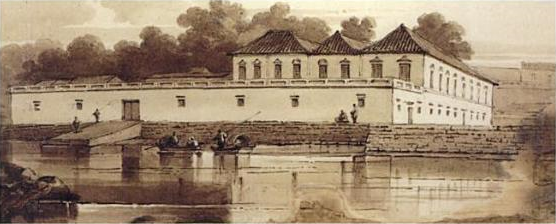
Dr. Colledge's ophthalmology clinic in Macau

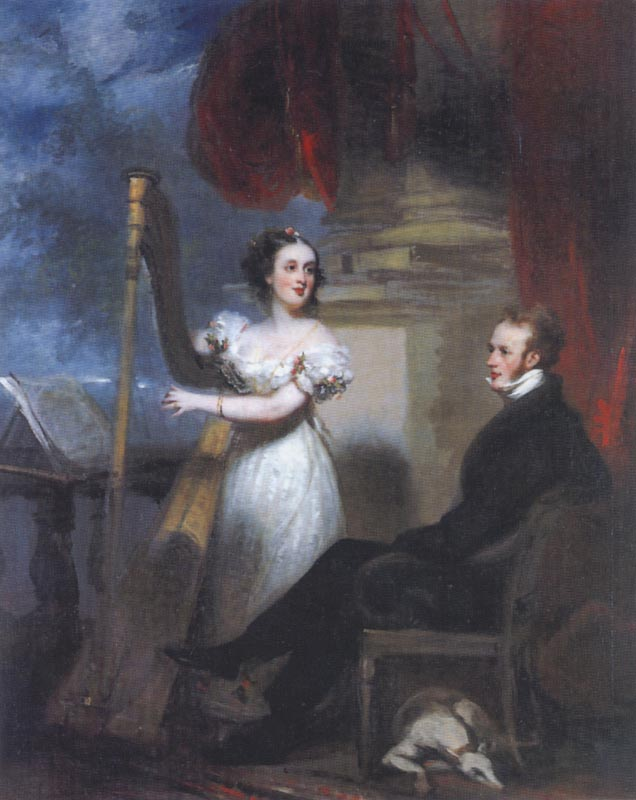
Colledge and his wife Caroline

Thomas Richardson Colledge (Chinese: 郭雷樞) (11 June 1797 – 28 October 1879) was an English surgeon with the East India Company at Guangzhou (Canton) who served part-time as the first medical missionary in China, and played a role in establishing the Canton Hospital. In 1837, he founded and served as the first president of the Medical Missionary Society of China.

== Life ==
Thomas Colledge was born in Kilsby Northamptonshire on 11 June 1797, and received his early medical education under Sir Astley Cooper before formal training (late in life) at Aberdeen University graduating MD in 1839, aged 43.

He earlier had found a position with the Honourable East India Company and through them practised in Canton and Macau and some other Chinese ports, first under the Hon. East India Company, and then under the crown, and was superintending surgeon of the Hospitals for British Seamen.

During his residence in Canton and Macau, he originated the first infirmary for Chinese patients, which was called after him, Colledge's Ophthalmic Hospital in 1827. He was also the founder, in 1837, of the Medical Missionary Society in China, and continued to be president of that society to the time of his death. On the abolition of the office of surgeon to the consulate at Canton in May 1841, and his consequent return to England, deep regret was expressed by the whole community, European and native, and a memorial of his services was addressed to her majesty by the Portuguese of the settlement of Macau, which caused Lord Palmerston to settle on him an annuity from the civil list. Before he left Asia, Colledge mentored an American surgeon, Peter Parker, who became the first full-time medical missionary to the Chinese.

Colledge took the degree of M.D. at King's College, Aberdeen, in 1839, became a fellow of the Royal College of Physicians of Edinburgh, 1840, a fellow of the Royal Society of Edinburgh 1844, and a fellow of the Royal College of Surgeons, England, 1853.

The last thirty-eight years of his life were spent in Cheltenham. He died at Lauriston House, Cheltenham, 28 Oct. 1879, aged 83. His widow Caroline Matilda (nee Shillaber) died 6 Jan. 1880. His brother-in-law John Shillaber was the first American Consul at Java.

Colledge and his wife had eight children, six sons and two daughters. The eldest son George Welstead married Katherine Mary Dent, daughter of William Dent and niece of Lancelot Dent. George died October 1863 at age 30 leaving four sons and a daughter. The next three sons Lancelot Dent, Thomas Richardson, and William Shillaber died in infancy in Macao. The fifth son John married Jane Mackenzie Inglis and had two sons and one daughter. The sixth and youngest son Robert Inglis was an invalid from birth and died in 1862 at age 13. The eldest daughter Caroline Georgina died at age 17. The youngest daughter France Mary married Cunliffe Martin and had eight children.

== Publications ==
1. A Letter on the subject of Medical Missionaries, by T. R. Colledge, senior surgeon to his Majesty's Commission printed at Macau, China, 1836
2. Suggestions for the Formation of a Medical Missionary Society offered to the consideration of all Christian Nations Canton, 1836.
