= John G. Kerr Refuge for the Insane =

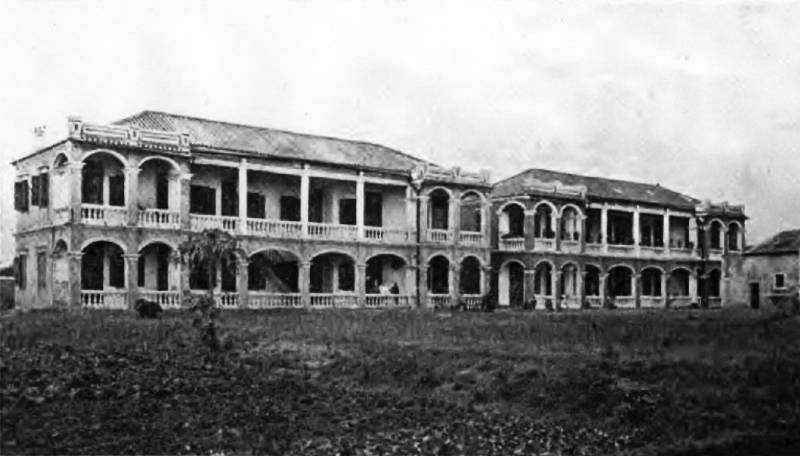
- Refuge for the Insane (Canton, China) in the 1890s

Geography
- Location: Canton (Guangzhou), Guangdong province, China

Services
- Beds: 500

History
- Opened: 1898
- Closed: 1937

Links
- Lists: Hospitals in China

The John G. Kerr Refuge for the Insane (simplified Chinese: 惠爱医癫院; traditional Chinese: 惠愛醫癲院; pinyin: Huìài Yīdiānyuàn; Jyutping: Wai6 Oi3 Ji1 Din1 Jyun2) was founded by the Presbyterian medical missionary, John Glasgow Kerr in Canton, China in 1898. The hospital was the first facility in China dedicated towards the treatment of mental illness, and was expanded up to 500 beds, operating until 1937.

== Background information ==
=== John G. Kerr ===
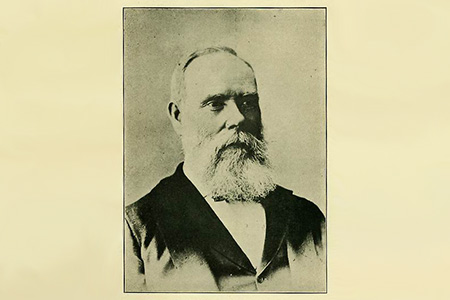
John Glasgow Kerr

John Glasgow Kerr was an American medical missionary. Before travelling to Canton in 1854, he attended Jefferson Medical College in Philadelphia, Pennsylvania.

Between 1854 and 1899, Kerr was superintendent of the Canton Hospital. In 1898, he established the first insane asylum in China, where he treated thousands of mentally ill patients in China.

In 1901, Kerr died at the age of seventy seven and his gravestone was engraved in both Chinese and English.

=== Treatment of Mentally Ill in China ===
Chinese medical thoughts are deeply rooted with a Confucian world and life view. By the sixteenth century, mental illness was recognized as a legitimate diagnostic category by Chinese medicine. However, access to quality medical care was limited to privileged members of society like the urban elites and members of the imperial court. The treatment of mental illness amongst common folk utilized practices such as home remedies, prayers, sacrifices, and exorcism. In 1731, the government proposed an amendment which resulted in the incarceration of "insane" individuals. This amendment was adopted as a law in 1740, however in response, there was widespread noncompliance and it was modified to be less restrictive.

Hospitalization was never seen as an option to the treatment of mentally ill individuals because Chinese ideologies saw hospitals as a place to die, rather than a place to receive treatment. Many of these individuals were restrained with chains and confined to their homes. Others became homeless, often mocked and occasionally even stoned on the streets. It was the alarming amounts of homeless individuals that caught the attention of medical missionaries in Canton.

==== Acceptance of Western Medicine to Treat Mentally Ill ====
As a result of the rural to urban shift at the time, families of mentally ill individuals found it increasingly hard to care for these individuals. Additionally, urbanization, population density, housing conditions, and the presence of foreigners also reduced social obligations for these family members.

== Hospital ==
=== Early Stages ===
Canton was a logical choice to build a new hospital because the city was strategically located and already accustomed to foreign practices. Many of the medical missionaries had grown familiar with local norms and established good relations with city leaders.

In the years leading up to the hospital's opening, Kerr travelled around the country in both China and America seeking financial support from wealthy citizens to build a hospital to treat the mentally ill. In 1876, at the International Medical Congress in Philadelphia, Kerr presented his work to the public. There, he outlined nine reasons to replace Chinese practicies with a Western approach:

1. The physicians of all semi-civilized nations are entirely ignorant of anatomy and physiology.
2. The nature of disease is unknown.
3. The properties of medicines are, to a great extent, unknown.
4. The practice of surgery among barbarous and semi-civilized peoples is of the most primitive and rude kind.
5. Midwifery is a department of medicine in which science and skill have devised most successful means of relieving suffering and prolonging life.
6. Superstitious notions and practices control and pervert medicine in all unenlightened countries.
7. The ignorance of infantile hygiene and of infantile diseases, is one of the most fruitful sources of suffering and death in barbarous and semi-civilized countries.
8. Laws of hygiene are entirely disregarded.
9. In unenlightened and unchristianized countries there are no benevolent institutions for the care of the sick and afflicted.

In 1891, Kerr purchased three acres of land at his own expense in a rural suburb of Canton, across the river from the foreign concession, called Fong Tsuen. In 1894, he received funds from former medical missionary to begin constructing buildings on the site. In 1897, the hospital, with twenty four beds, was ready. The first patient was admitted the following year.

=== Charles Selden ===
Charles Selden was Kerr's successor, taking over for Kerr's vision after his death in 1901. Selden was born in Pennsylvania on February 10, 1861. He attended Harvard University before completing his two-year medical residency at Brooklyn Hospital in New York City and receiving his medical/surgical license. In 1900, Selden, along with his wife and eldest son, arrived in Canton to experience the hospital first hand. Selden wrote that their five-month experience with the Kerrs convinced them to join the hospital team and they moved to Fong Tsuen in 1901. After Kerr's passing in 1901, Selden took over to run the hospital. Selden worked to introduce the neuropsychiatric approach to mental illness which stood in contrast to locally held beliefs, including those of the staff, and government policy. Shortly after, the growing number of admissions made conditions at the hospital difficult. Stress from overcrowding took a toll on Selden's health. As time passed, Selden experienced mental deterioration, which began to compromise his ability to continue running the hospital on a long-term basis. J. Allen Hoffman took on many of the superintendent roles.

=== Operation Stages ===
==== Opening Years ====
In 1898, the hospital “opened as a distinctly Christian institution”, and operated privately. The first two buildings were privately funded. While the goal was to have patients pay for treatment, the hospital did not turn anyone away if they could not afford it. Otherwise, the monthly cost for room and board was about four to five dollars.

The first patient was a man who only survived a few months in the new hospital after being found in a home where his relatives had chained him to a stone for at least three years. As Kerr began to treat more patients, he realized that surrounding the mentally ill with a Western hospital environment was not enough to cure them. While staff strongly believed in treating patients with the respect and kindness they lacked at home, hospital staff used similar methods of restraint that Chinese households previously used to handle hostile and irrational patients.

Work with the patients demanded the tolerance of erratic behavior as well as the environmental conditions in Canton. Selden's daughter wrote that "life was primitive in Canton in those early days, sometimes like the frontier in early America". Furthermore, after Kerr's passing, the staff consisted of Charles Selden as hospital superintendent, Mrs.Kerr, along with three Board members: Rev. H. V. Noyes, D. D., Mr. Lei Yok Tin. As the hospital's success demanded more staff, native physicians were hired and by 1925, the staff was composed of persons from both Chinese and foreign communities.

==== Evangelism ====
Mrs. Kerr took charge of evangelistic work, developing a weekly routine that included activities like bible study, daily chapel, Sunday worship, and prayer meetings. In 1903 she reported, “We have reason to believe that two, perhaps three of those that have recovered from their insanity have been converted”. Furthermore, students from the nearby Presbyterian Theological Seminary came to practice their preachings on patients and staff members. Soon, a full evangelistic program was developed with separate bible studies offered for men and women.

==== Transition to Public Practice ====
In 1904 a police officer arrived, bringing an insane man and a letter from the Commissioner of Police asking the hospital to admit the man for treatment”. The patient was brought in with the standard $5 boarding fee, but it was the first time a public-private link was established for the hospital. By admitting public patients and accepting public money, the hospital ceased to hold private status.

At this time, cases continued to come from government officials. Police brought in mentally ill patients from the streets of Canton and those who had been deported from Hong Kong. As a result, the hospital was paid an annual allowance for taking care of these patients. Patients brought by police came to compose over h**In the Report of 1907-1908—of the 174 patients, “96 were committed to the hospital and supported by the officials. Of these 96, about one half were brought up from Hong Kong and half of the hospital's total patients.

In 1910, a hospital staff member wrote: "Since the opening in 1898 there have been admitted 1480 patients. At present there are 250 and more. Last year 239 entered; 196 were discharged. Of the latter, 97 went away well, being 40% of the number admitted, 49% of the number discharged". Additionally, hospital records from 1914 and 1915 reveal that a majority of patients in Kerr's hospital were diagnosed with "Manic depression". Other common illnesses treated in the hospital were "Dementia praecox", "General paralysis of the insane", and "Alcoholic psychoses". Despite the hospital's relative success, the hospital was also constantly struggling with overcrowding. The main challenge faced was for the limited hospital staff to manage the abundance of patients.

In 1916, a special isolation room for violent patients was built and electric lights were installed in patient houses for safety. By 1923, the Refuge owned twenty three English acres with over fifty structures, cottages and small buildings.

By 1924, the hospital was forced to stop accepting government patients because the government's debt to the hospital had grown to $73,000.

==== State Control ====
Municipal elites in Canton became increasingly involved in providing philanthropic organizations and charities. Selden, however, argued that the hospital was solely owned by the missionaries. His argument was not well received because nationalism was valued over foreign practices in that political climate. Sentiments at the time reflected the Chinese people's desire to be free from foreign oppression and missionary interference. Sun Yatsen's Nationalist Party (Kuomintang) and the newly established Chinese Communist Party (CCP) were organized with the goal of establishing a new political order. The CCP had intentions to take over the hospital and begin conducting work according to communist principles. The hospital avoided the CCP from taking over by shutting down in 1926.

On January 15, 1927, the hospital's board of directors decided to close the hospital. Because Selden could not simply send patients home or discharge them to the streets, an agreement was met where the hospital would be partially taken over by the government for an annual fee.

In 1937, the hospital ceased operations.

=== Legacy ===
The Refuge for the Insane was the first hospital dedicated towards the treatment of insanity and mental illness in China. The work done in this hospital introduced Western approaches in medicine through example. Furthermore, the hospital leaders and staff published reports throughout their years of operation, documenting the treatments being done and their reflections on the effectiveness. While they were primarily targeted towards an American audience, they each included the hospital's yearly information on the medical staff, evangelical staff, board of trustees, map of buildings, discussion of political events, needs, treatment methods, an evangelistic report, and a financial report. Ultimately, the goal of these resports was to emphasize the success of Western treatments and encourage the Chinese government to consider adopting a similar approach.
