= Joseph Clarke Thomson =

American medical missionary to China

Rev. Dr. Joseph Clarke Thomson
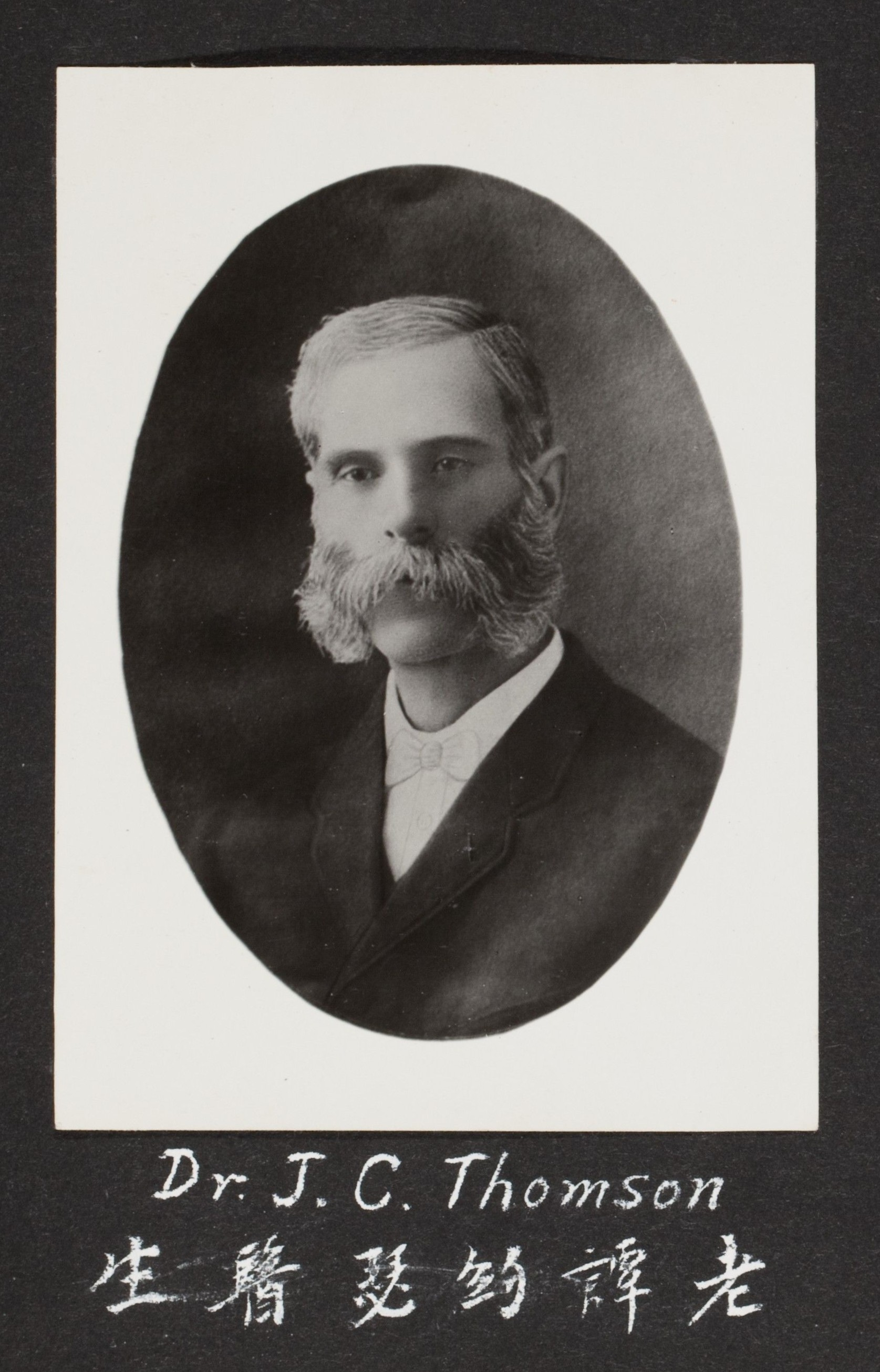
- Born: April 10, 1853; Cincinnati, Ohio, US
- Died: November 18, 1926 (aged 73); Canton, China
- Education: Hanover College (BA) Union Theological Seminary (MA) University Medical College, New York City (MD)
- Occupations: Medical missionary; superintendent and surgeon of Canton Hospital
- Spouse: Agnes Dornin Thomson

Joseph Clarke Thomson (1853–1926) was a medical missionary in South China from 1881 until his death in 1926. He worked with Dr. John Glasgow Kerr to establish the Canton Hospital and was superintendent from 1884 to 1885. As an eye surgeon, he was most well known for removing cataracts. "With his silver needle he made the blind to see" was his citation.

== Early life and education ==
Joseph C. Thomson was born in Cincinnati, Ohio, on April 10, 1853. He was of Scottish ancestry. His great-grandfather David Fergus was one of the first settlers of Cincinnati in 1822 and was the first Presbyterian clergyman to reside there. His mother, Janet Langlands Thomson, gave the land on which the North Presbyterian Church was built, and Joseph was the first infant baptized in that church.

Thomson graduated from Hanover College in 1875, Union Theological Seminary in 1878, and University Medical College, New York City in 1881. He was ordained by the Presbytery of Cincinnati in 1881. He later received an honorary degree of Doctor of Divinity from Bellevue Hospital Medical College in 1923.

He married Agnes Louise Dornin of New York City on September 21, 1881, in the Fifth Avenue Presbyterian Church and in October, they sailed to China as missionaries under the American Board of Foreign Missions of the Presbyterian Church.

== Career ==
By 1882, Thomson was working as an eye surgeon at Canton Hospital with superintendent John Kerr. Canton Hospital was the oldest and one of the largest Western hospitals in China. In 1884, Kerr's ill health necessitated him to return home to America, and Thomson was put in charge of the hospital. He remained acting superintendent through 1885, when Kerr returned from medical leave.

During his service at Canton Hospital, Thomson received and instructed Dr. Sun Yat-sen, who became the first president of the Chinese Republic. Canton Hospital is today the Second Affiliated Hospital of Sun Yat-sen University. Dr. Sun Yat-sen was present at the 75th anniversary of the hospital's founding where he lauded the institution and gave a donation.

This was during the time of the Sino-French War, when feelings against foreigners were running high in Canton. There were often mobs at the front doors of the hospital and threats of destruction, but Thomson was committed to keeping it running without interruption.

In 1886, Thomson and his family moved to Macao, later opening up Yeong Kong and Ko Chow stations of the American Board Mission. In 1887, they moved to Yeong Kong and Thomson attempted to build a hospital there, but as soon as worked started, it was torn down and burned by angry locals. Later a group of students returning from Canton determined to drive out the "foreign devils" surrounded the Thomson family home and broke into the first floor while the family and children were upstairs. Fortunately a head woman of the village was able to drive them away.

In 1892, Thomson, with his wife and their four children, returned to Cincinnati on furlough for two years. Although they expected to return to China at the end of the furlough, Thomson was invited by the Foreign Mission Board to work with the large Chinese populations in Eastern Canada. In 1894 he was made superintendent of the Chinese mission work under the Canadian Presbyterian Church and moved the family to Montreal. It was largely due to Thomson's efforts that the Canadian Presbyterian Church decided to establish a mission in Macao in 1901.

After twenty-five years in Montreal, Thomson returned to China in 1919 to continue his missionary work with Canton Hospital. His son J. Oscar Thomson had been a surgeon at the hospital since 1910 and became superintendent in the 1920s and 30s. All of Thomson's children were involved in missionary work in China and other countries in Asia.

Thomson also wrote many articles for the China Medical Missionary Society, Chinese Recorder, and other journals.

== Death and legacy ==
Joseph C. Thomson died of heart failure on November 18, 1926, in Canton, China.
