= William Cadbury =

William Cadbury may refer to:

- William Adlington Barrow Cadbury, English businessman
- William Warder Cadbury, American physician, professor and medical missionary
