= George Welstead Colledge =

British Indian civil servant

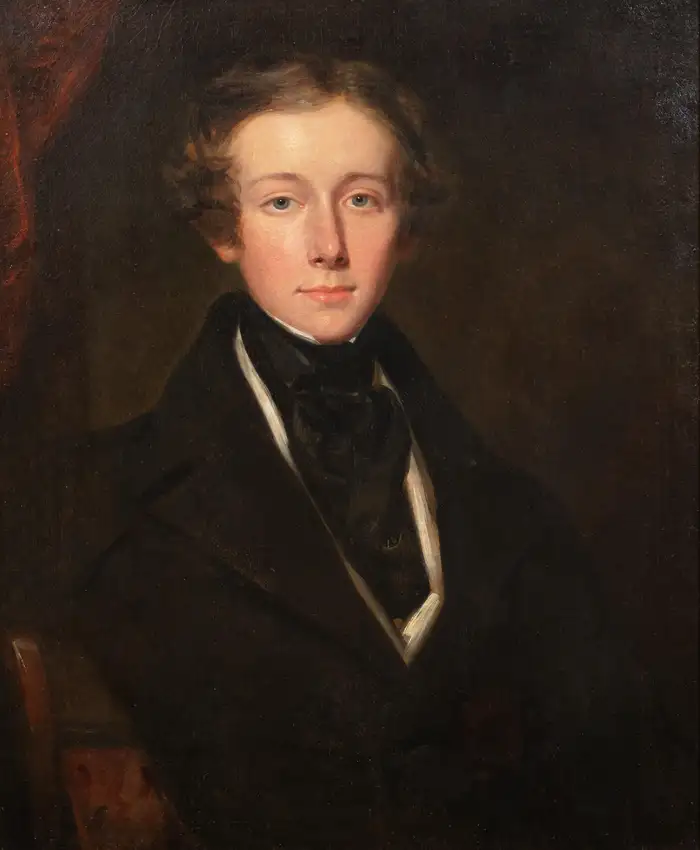
- George Welstead Colledge by George Chinnery
- Born: 1 February 1834; Macau, China
- Died: 7 October 1863; Bilaspur, India
- Occupation: Indian Civil Service officer
- Years active: 1853-1863

George Welstead Colledge (1 February 1834 - 7 October 1863) was a British joint magistrate and deputy collector at Bulandshahr, North-Western Provinces, India. He was born in Macau, China, the eldest son of Thomas Richardson Colledge, gained admission to Haileybury (1851–1853), and passed the examination of the Indian Civil Service at a young age. During the Indian Rebellion of 1857 he served at Saharanpur, Uttar Pradesh. He died in 1863, the third district collector of Bulandshahr to have died within the previous three years.

== Early life and education ==
George Welstead Colledge was born in Macau, China, the eldest son of Thomas Richardson Colledge, a surgeon who practised in Macau and Canton. He had five brothers and two sisters. In 1851 he passed the entrance exams for Haileybury, and there, came first in Persian.

== Indian Civil Service ==
Upon passing the East India Company exams in 1853, Colledge was appointed to the Bengal Division of the Civil Service. The following year he married Katherine Mary, the eldest daughter of William Dent of Bickley, Kent, a director of the old East India Company. They had one daughter and four sons.

In 1855 Colledge was appointed assistant to the Meerut Division, North-Western Provinces. During the Indian Rebellion of 1857 he served at Saharanpur, Uttar Pradesh. From 20 March 1863 to 6 October 1863 he served as magistrate and Collector of the district of Bulandshahr.

== Death and legacy ==
Colledge died from "brain fever" on 7 October 1863 at the age of 29 years, in Bilaspur, the third district collector of Bulandshahr to have died within the previous three years.

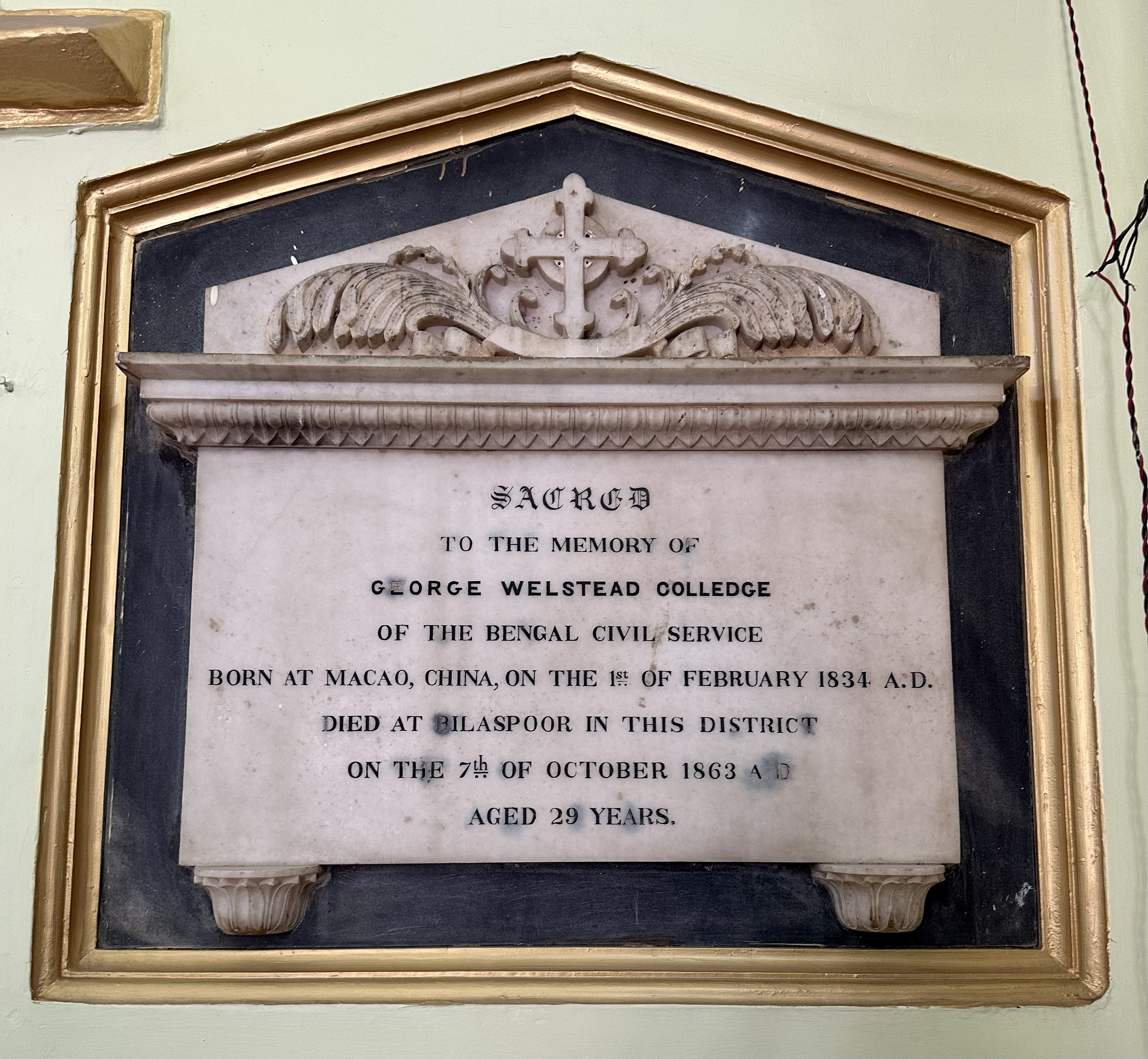
Colledge, All Saints Church, Bulandshahr

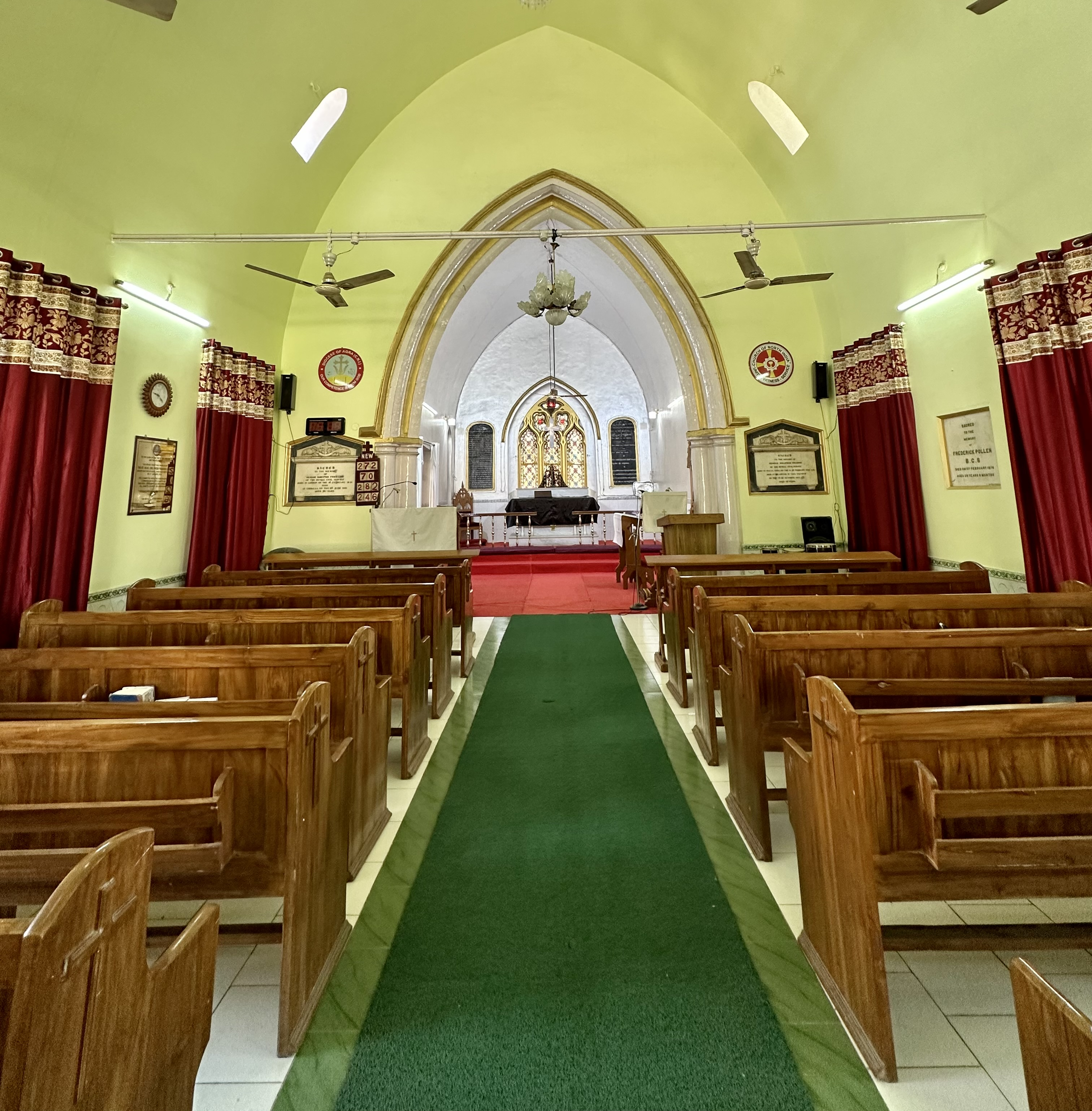
Interior, All Saints Church

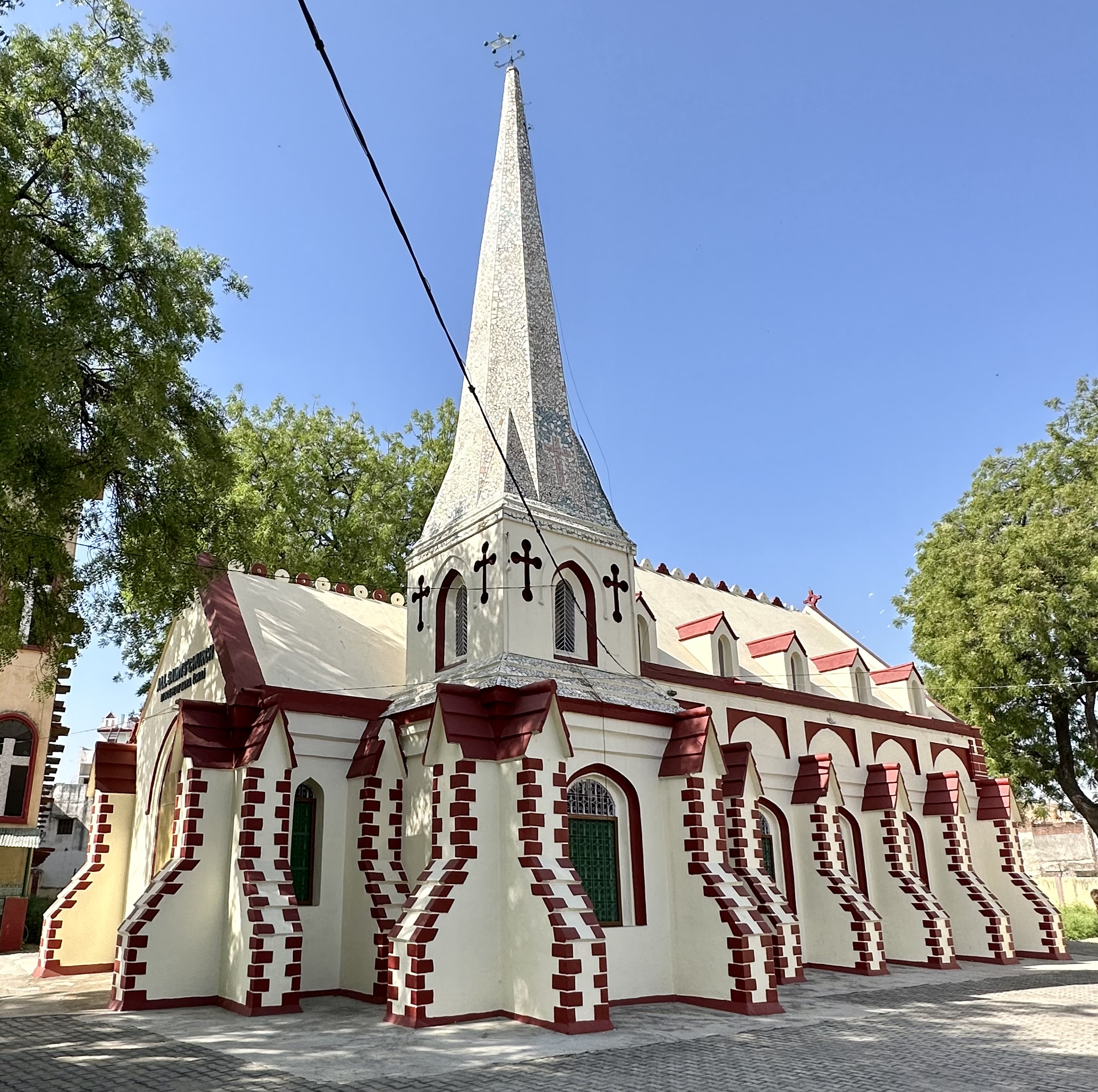
All Saints Church, Bulandshahr
