= International family medicine =

Global health family medicine or international family medicine physicians are family physicians that specialize in working with underserved populations in resource-poor environments, often in developing nations. These physicians face the challenge of diagnosing patients without advanced laboratory or imaging techniques. Because of limited access to medications and specialists, International Family Medicine physicians must have flexible treatment strategies and a broad scope of practice.

== History ==
Peter Parker, MD was one of the earliest full time American medical missionaries in 1834. He opened an ophthalmology hospital in China. Many physicians have worked in developing nations over the years. Surgeons and primary care physicians alike have donated their time or their entire lives to needy populations in the world. Modern organizations such as Médecins Sans Frontières (Doctors Without Borders) organize physicians from around the world to provide disaster medicine and relief work during times of extreme need or natural disasters.

Interest in international medicine among medical students and residents has been increasing. Many medical schools and residencies are offering global health tracks. Family medicine physicians, because of their broad scope, are particularly well suited for practicing in areas where specialists are not readily available. For those family physicians that desired full time careers in international medicine would generally begin their work immediately after residency. Because of the varied conditions of the developing world versus the training environment there is often a very steep learning curve for Western trained family physicians.

In response to improving the preparedness for American family physicians, International Family Medicine Fellowships have emerged recently. These fellowships aim to better prepare family medicine graduates for the challenges that they will face overseas. The need for physicians well suited for international challenges is greatly needed, especially in areas with large refugee populations.

== Scope of practice ==
Family medicine is a comprehensive specialty whose physicians are trained to provide continuing care across the life course and in multiple clinical settings. Depending on their training, community needs, and institutional privileges, international family physicians may provide outpatient and inpatient care and treat illnesses related to obstetrics, pediatrics, adult medicine, and orthopedics. International family medicine physicians also often manage tropical medicine, surgery, anesthesia, burn care, and HIV care.

In addition to the medical challenges, International family medicine physicians may also assume leadership and clinical governance in developing nations. The issues faced often range from obtaining local pharmaceuticals and supplies to repairing broken medical equipment. Engaging the public health issues of communities relating to sanitation and clean water is yet another task that falls on the wide shoulders of the physician. Cultural differences and corrupt governments also add impediments to the delivery of healthcare by international family medicine physicians.
