= Dunkinsville, Ohio =

- Unincorporated community
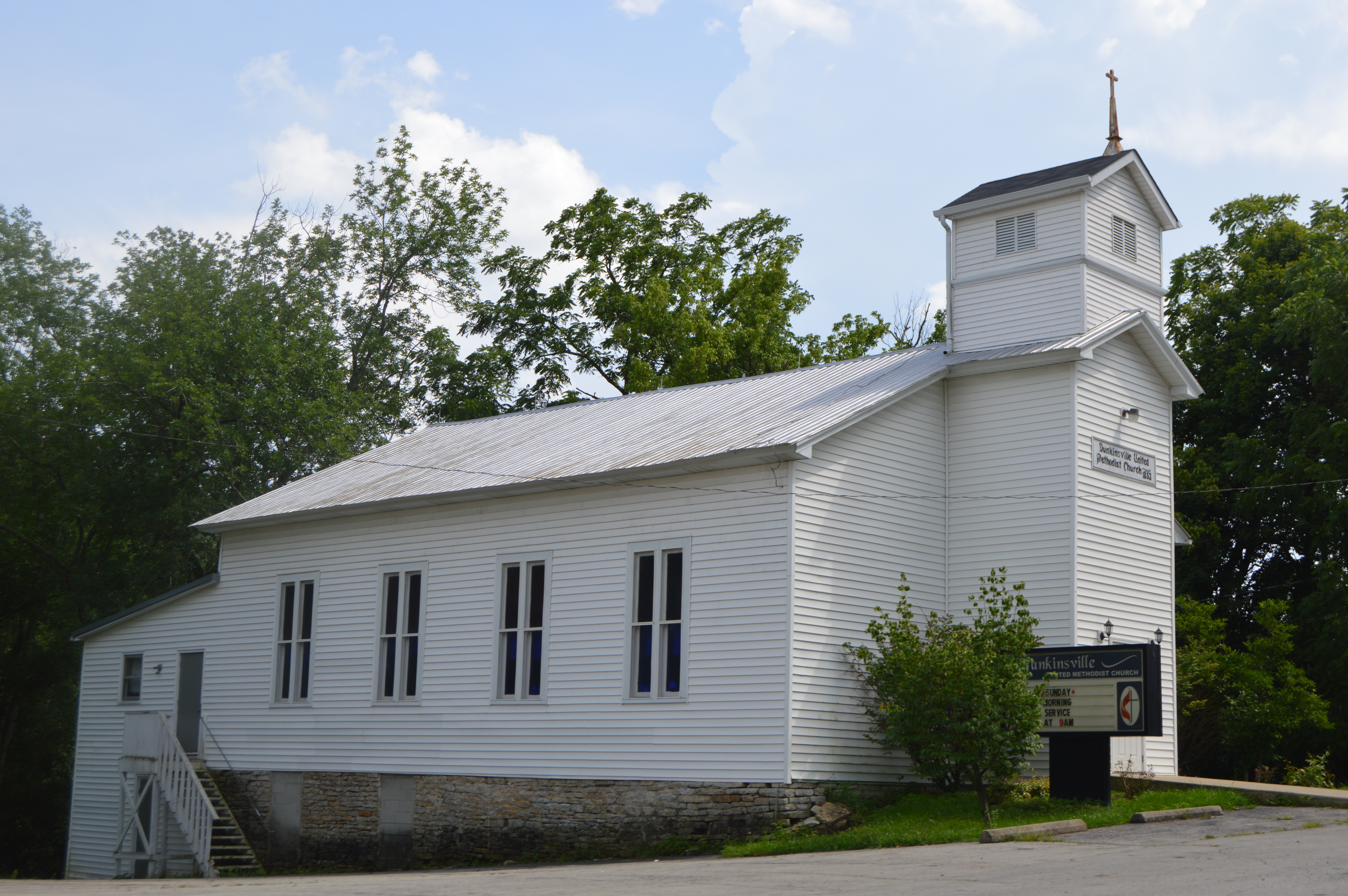
- Dunkinsville United Methodist Church

- Location within Ohio Location within the United States
- Coordinates: 38°51′21″N 83°28′17″W
- Country: United States
- State: Ohio
- County: Adams
- Elevation: 614 ft (187 m)
- Time zone: UTC-5 (Eastern (EST))
  - Summer (DST): UTC-4 (EDT)
- ZIP Code: 45660
- Area codes: 937, 326
- GNIS feature ID: 1378030

Dunkinsville is an unincorporated community in Adams County, in the U.S. state of Ohio.

== History ==
Dunkinsville was laid out in 1841. A post office was established at Dunkinsville in 1847, and remained in operation until 1909.

== Notable residents ==
- John Glasgow Kerr
