= Lam Qua =

Chinese artist (1801–1860)

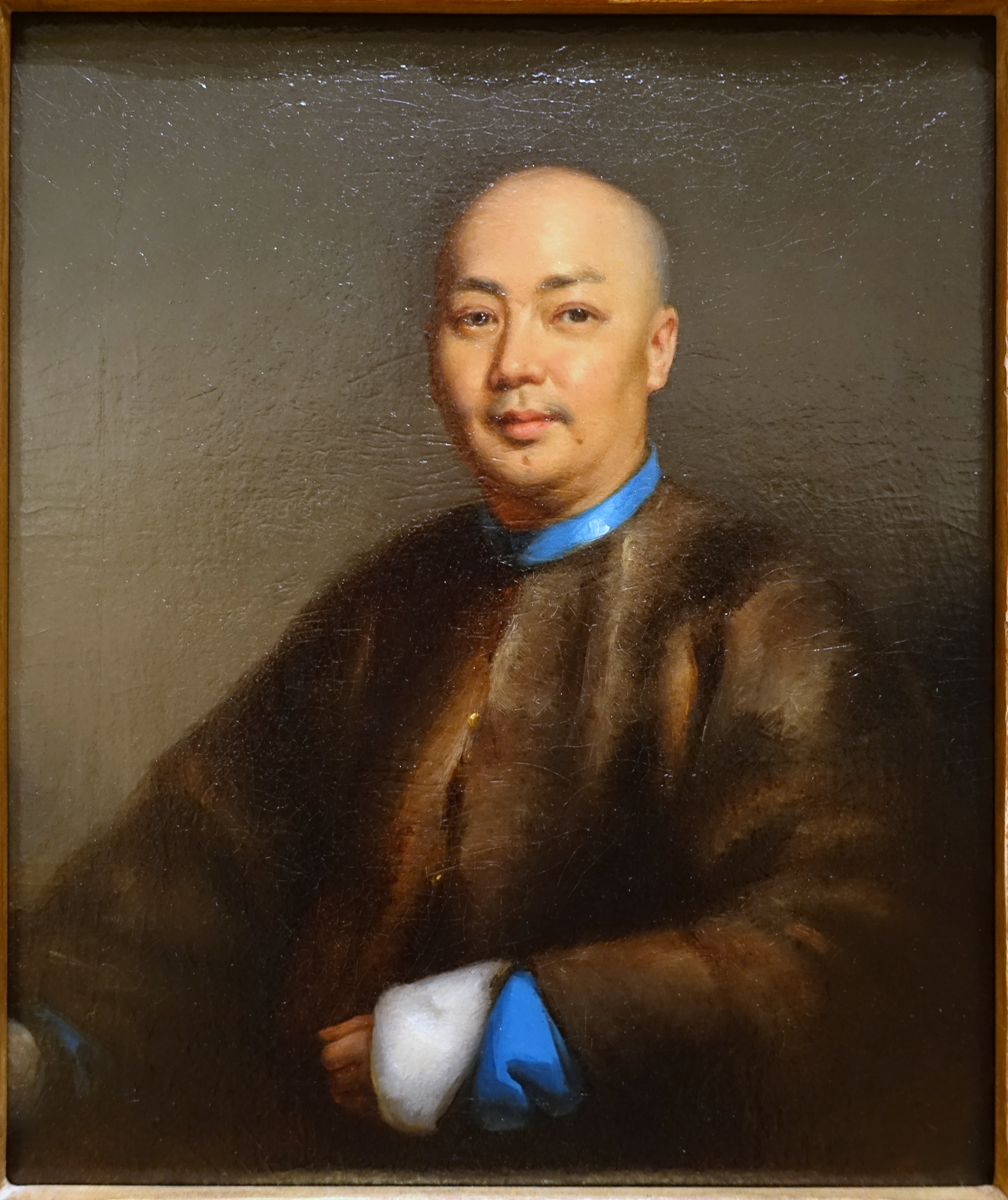
Self-portrait by Lam Qua

Lam Qua (Chinese: 林官; Cantonese Yale: Lam Kwan; 1801–1860), or Kwan Kiu Cheong (關喬昌), was a Chinese painter from the Canton province in Qing dynasty China, who specialized in Western-style portraits intended largely for Western clients. Lam Qua was the first Chinese portrait painter to be exhibited in the West. He is known for his medical portraiture, and for his portraits of Western and Chinese merchants in Canton and Macau. He had a workshop in 'New China Street' among the Thirteen Factories in Canton.

In the 1820s, Lam Qua is said by some contemporaries to have studied with George Chinnery, the first English painter to settle in China – although Chinnery himself denied this. Lam Qua became well-known and skilled in Chinnery's style of portraiture. He developed a following among the international community, and undercut Chinnery's prices.

From 1836 to 1855, Lam Qua produced a series of medical portraits of patients under treatment with physician Peter Parker, a medical missionary from the United States. Parker commissioned Lam Qua to paint pre-operative portraits of patients who had large tumors or other major deformities. Some of the paintings are now part of a collection of Lam Qua's work held by Yale University in the Peter Parker Collection at the Harvey Cushing/John Hay Whitney Medical Library; others are in the Gordon Museum, Guy's Hospital, London.
