= Medical Missionary Society of China =

The Medical Missionary Society in China was a Protestant medical missionary society established in Canton, China, in 1838.

The first work of the society was to support the ophthalmic hospital in Canton run by Dr. Peter Parker, a medical missionary of the American Board of Commissioners for Foreign Missions. The founder and first president was Dr. Thomas Richardson Colledge. The society split in 1845 when some of the members moved to Hong Kong. Only the Canton society continued into the twentieth century. In its heyday the society supported mission hospitals staffed by British and American doctors at Canton, Hong Kong, Macao, Amoy, Ningpo and Shanghai. A number of young Chinese men were trained in Western medicine in the society's hospitals in the early days.

== See also ==
- Medical missions
- Medical missions in China
