= George Chinnery =

English painter (1774–1852)

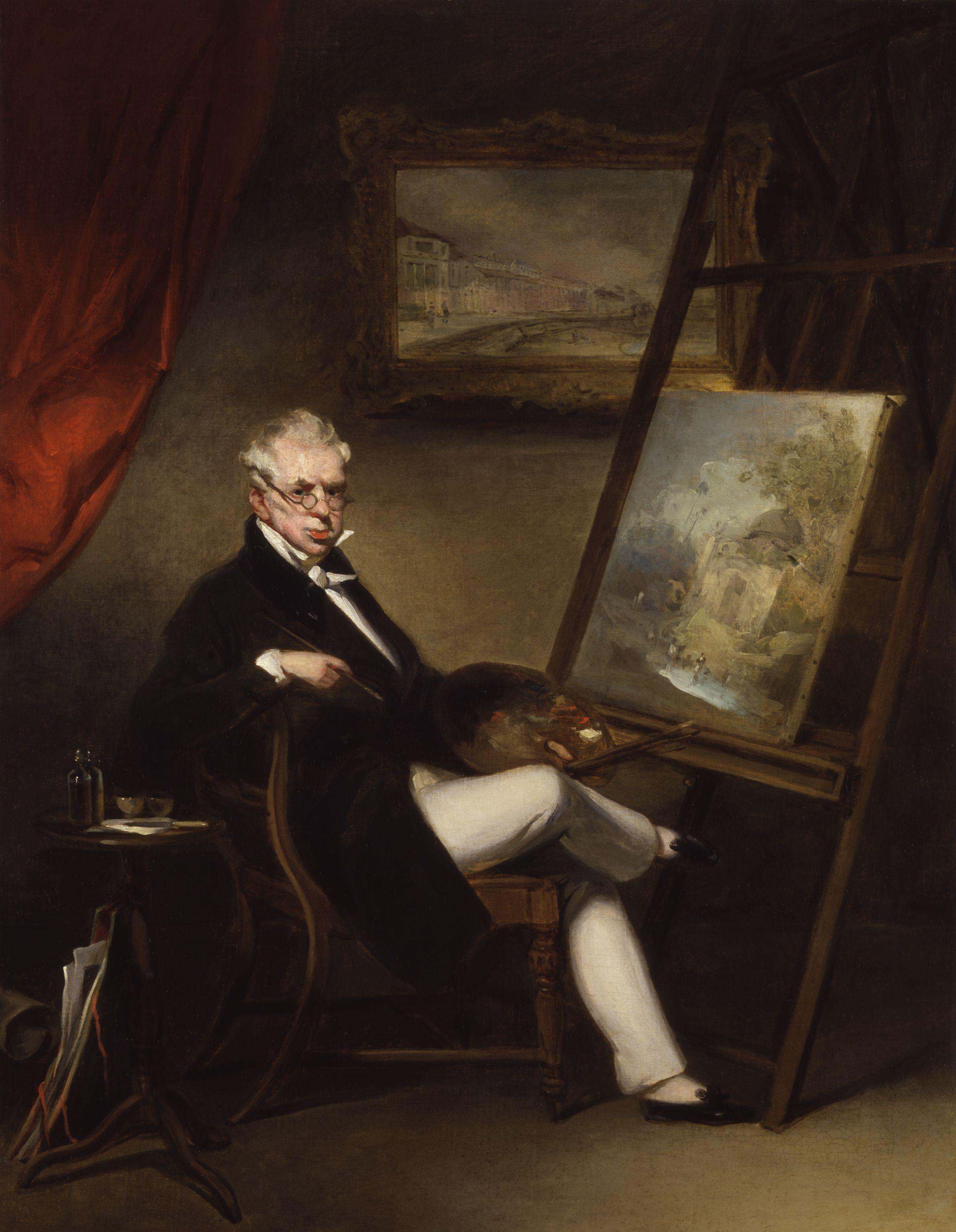
- Self-portrait, c. 1840
- Born: 5 January 1774; London, England
- Died: 30 May 1852 (aged 78); Portuguese Macau
- Known for: Painting

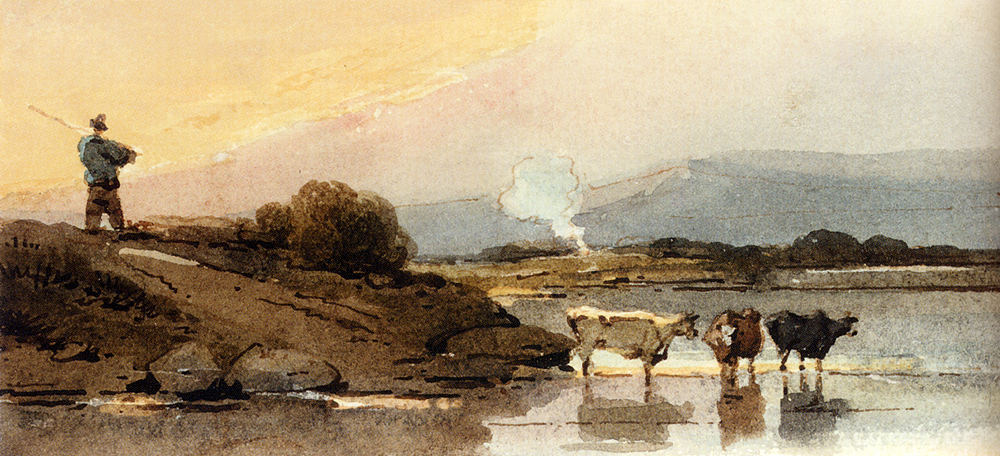
An Indian herdsman on a bank, cattle watering in a river below

George Chinnery (Chinese: 錢納利, pinyin: Qiánnàlì; 5 January 1774 – 30 May 1852) was an English painter who spent most of his life in Asia, especially India and southern China.

== Early life ==
Chinnery was born in London, where he studied at the Royal Academy Schools. His father was an exponent of the Gurney system of shorthand; his elder brother William Chinnery owned what is now Gilwell Park in Epping Forest in Essex, before he was discovered to have committed large-scale fraud, and fled to Sweden. George Chinnery moved in 1796 to Ireland, where he enjoyed some success as an artist, and married Marianne (née Vigne) on 19 April 1799 in Dublin.

== Career ==
Chinnery returned to London in 1801 without his wife and two infant children. In 1802 he sailed to Madras (Chennai) on the ship Gilwell. He established himself as a painter there and then in Calcutta (Kolkata), where he became the leading artist of the British community in India.

By 1813 Chinnery was a freemason, listed as a member of Calcutta's well-to-do masonic lodge Star in the East. This was one of three masonic lodges in that city which took part in the official welcome for Lord Moira (1754-1826), also a freemason, on his arrival there (1813) as the new Governor-General of India. Chinnery's masonic career is otherwise little documented, and its connection with his artistic output unexplored.

Some of his most famous paintings are of the Indian family of Colonel James Achilles Kirkpatrick British Resident to the Nizam of Hyderabad who had set up home, to some scandal among his fellow Europeans, with the Indo-Iranian great niece of the Nizam of Hyderabad's chief minister. He painted The Kirkpatrick Children presenting them " [with a] sympathy that is rare in portraiture of the period; the boy looking straight at the viewer with a self-conscious stance, hand on hip, while the girl looks uncomfortably at the floor." Mounting debt prompted a move in 1825 to southern China.

From 1825 until his death in 1852 Chinnery based himself in Macau, but until 1832 he made regular visits to Canton (now Guangzhou). He painted portraits of Chinese and Western merchants, visiting sea-captains, and their families resident in Macau. His work in oil paint was closely imitated by the Cantonese artist Lam Qua, who himself became a renowned portrait painter. Chinnery also painted landscapes (both in oils and in watercolours), and made numerous drawings of the people of Macau engaged in their daily activities.

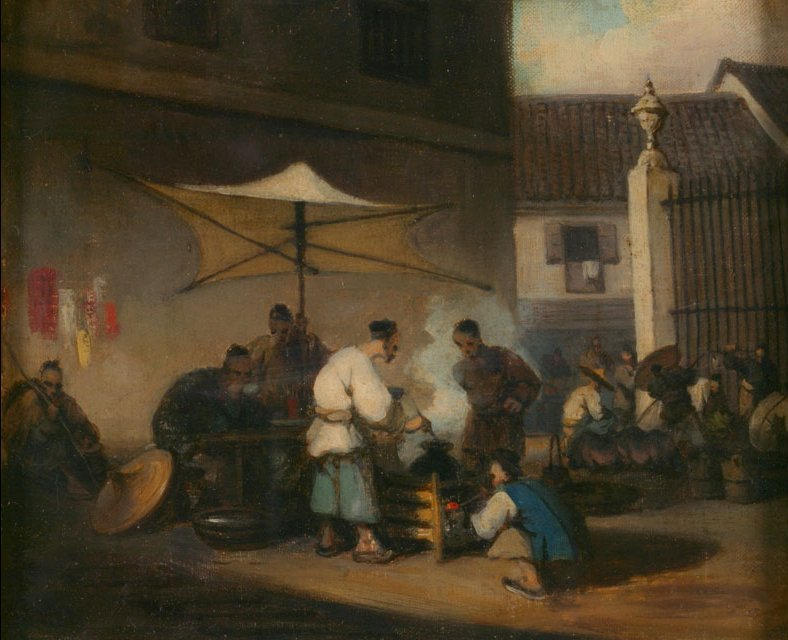
At the time, westerners were restricted in their access to China, trading out of settlements in Macau and later Hong Kong, where Chinnery also went - His interest in the local scene does indeed set him apart from most western artists of the time.

In 1846 he made a six-month visit to Hong Kong, where he suffered from ill health but made detailed studies of the newly founded colony. He died in Macau on 30 May 1852 and is buried in the Old Protestant Cemetery there.

== Works ==
Apart from their artistic value, his paintings are historically valuable as he was the only western painter resident in South China between the early and mid 19th century. He vividly depicted the life of ordinary people and the landscape of the Pearl River Delta at that period. Among the subjects of his portraits are the Scottish opium traders William Jardine and James Matheson as well as the diarist Harriet Low.

George Chinnery learnt the Gurney system shorthand from his father and grandfather (both writing-masters), and he used his own modified version of this shorthand for jotting quick notes on his pencil sketches.

== Legacy ==
Substantial collections of Chinnery's drawings are to be found in London in the Victoria and Albert Museum and the British Museum; and in Salem, Mass., at the Peabody Essex Museum. Other notable groups are held in Birmingham Museum and Art Gallery, UK; the Hong Kong Museum of Art; the Macau Museum; and the Macau Museum of Art. The Hongkong and Shanghai Banking Corporation can claim to have the outstanding corporate collection of Chinnery's works. Loan exhibitions of his pictures have been held recently in Centro Cultural de Belém, Lisbon (1995); Metropolitan Teien Art Museum, Tokyo (1996); Hong Kong Museum of History, Hong Kong (2005); and Macau Museum (2010).

Chinnery was the basis for the artist Aristotle Quance in the James Clavell novel Tai-Pan.

== Gallery of works ==
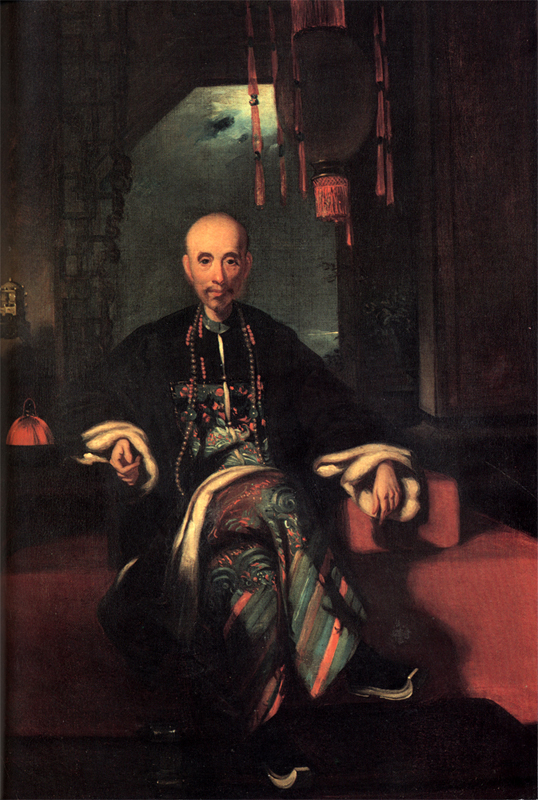
The Hong merchant Howqua, 1830, he was once one of the richest men in the world

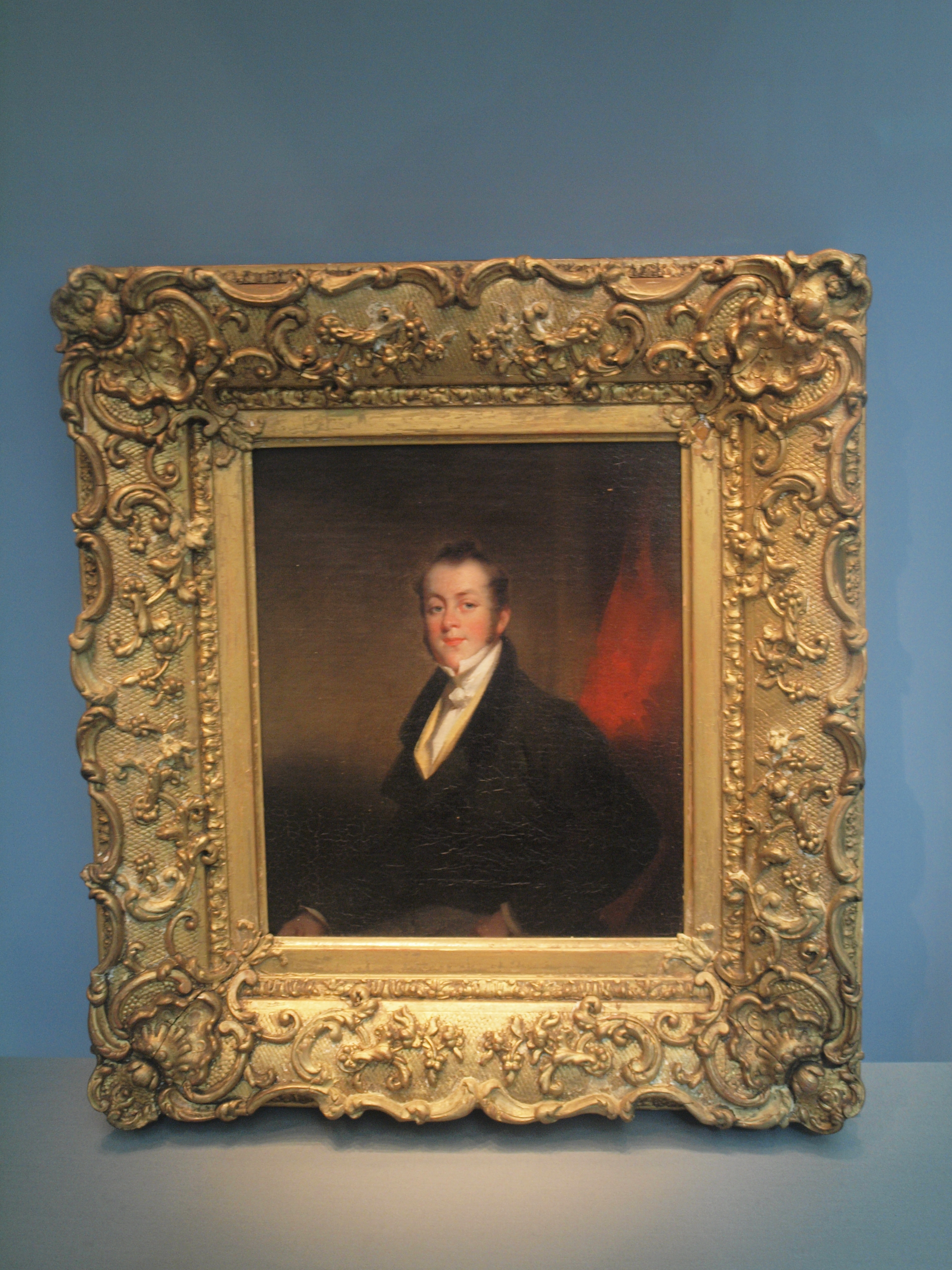
Portrait of Thomas Beale, 1802-1803)

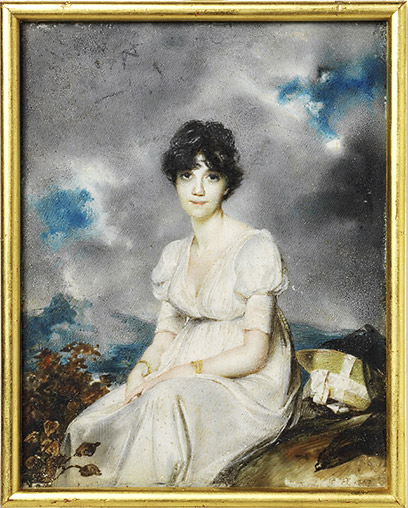
Watercolour on ivory of Catherine Sherson, (born Taylor), 1802–03

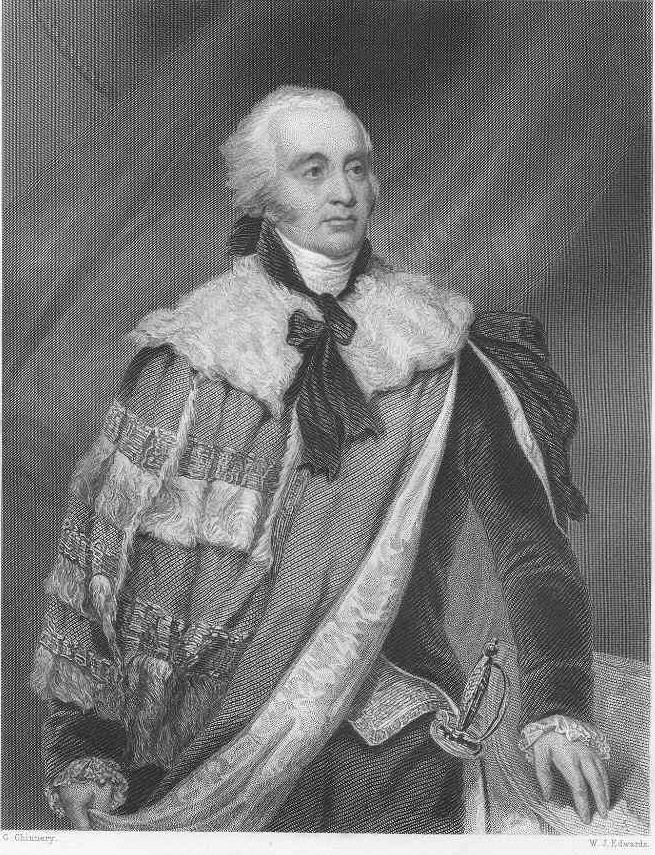
Portrait of Gilbert Eliot, 1st Earl of Minto, (1811-1812)

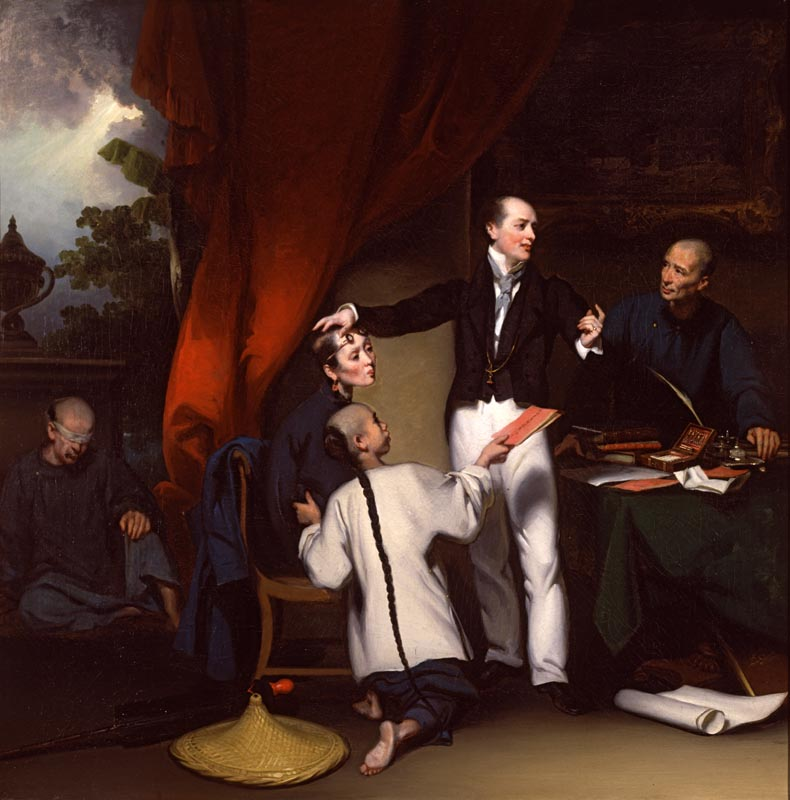
Thomas Richardson Colledge with patients (c. 1833-1835)

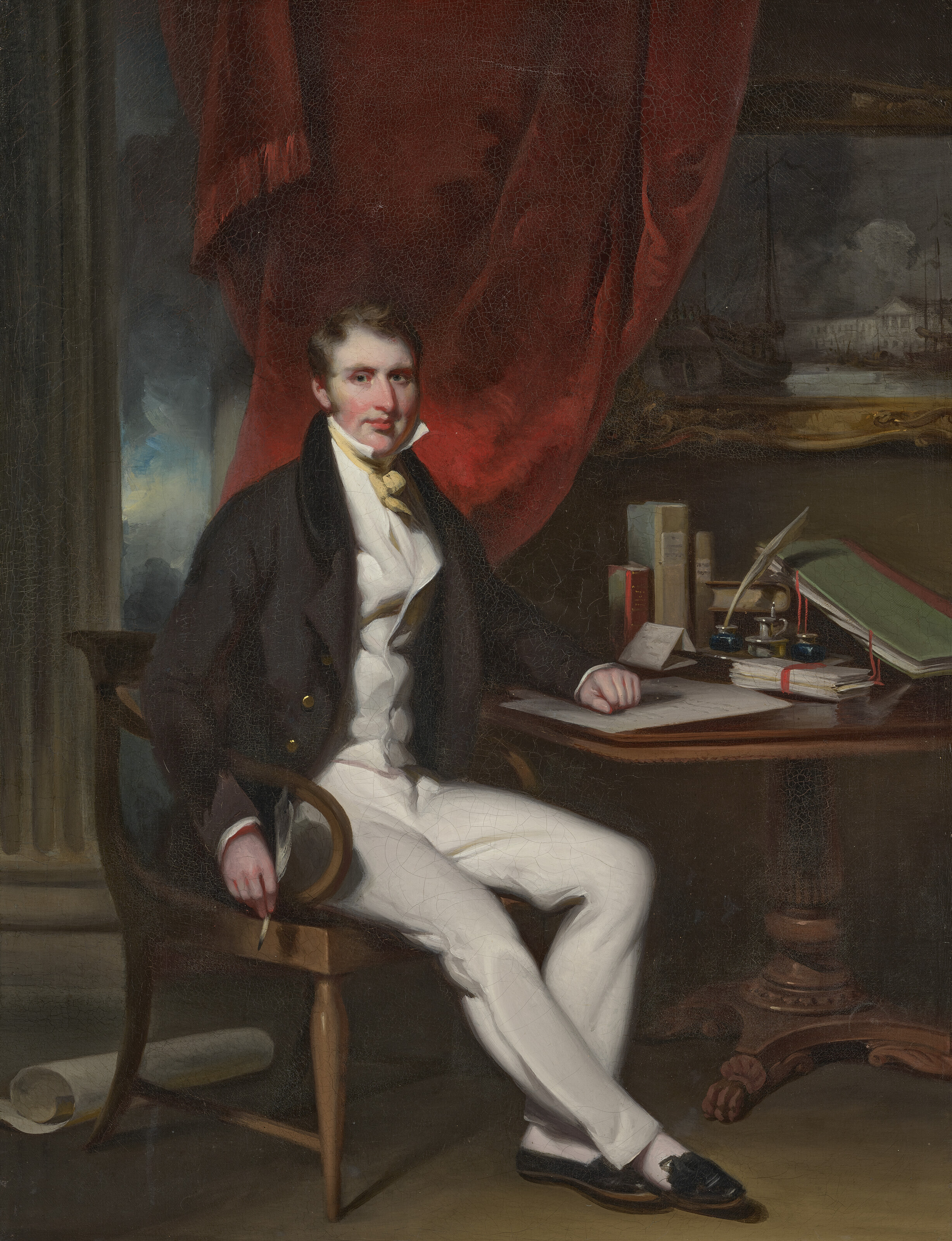
William Jardine in his study
