= John Glasgow Kerr =

American missionary

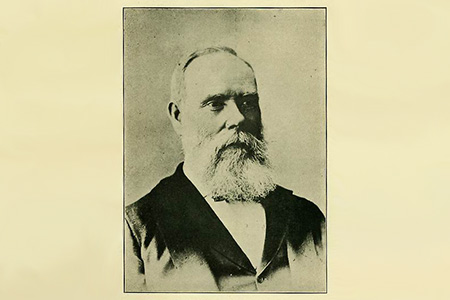
Portrait of John Glasgow Kerr

John Glasgow Kerr (November 30, 1824—1901) was an American medical missionary and philanthropist who helped establish The Canton Hospital, also known as the Ophthalmic Hospital, in Canton, China.

Kerr was born in Dunkinsville, Ohio and graduated from Jefferson Medical College in Philadelphia. He arrived in Canton in May 1854 with his wife to run the Huiji Dispensary of the Presbyterian Mission and the Canton Hospital (1855); Kerr served as superintendent of the hospital for 45 years. In 1859, Kerr opened Boji (boji meaning spreading benevolence) Hospital, located in Zhengsha Street in a southern suburb of Canton. In 1860, Kerr opened of the second dispensary in Foshan, later becoming the largest hospital in the city. In 1899, Kerr opened the first mental hospital in China.

During his time in Canton, Kerr treated 39,440 inpatients and 740,324 outpatients from 4,000 villages.

== Early life ==
John Glasgow Kerr was born on November 30, 1824. After his father's death, Kerr moved to Virginia to live with his uncle. In 1840, he started college in Granville, Ohio. Kerr studied medicine at Jefferson Medical College in Philadelphia and graduated in 1847. He married Abby Lucy Kingsbury (1829–1855) in 1853 before leaving to become a medical missionary in China.

== Career ==
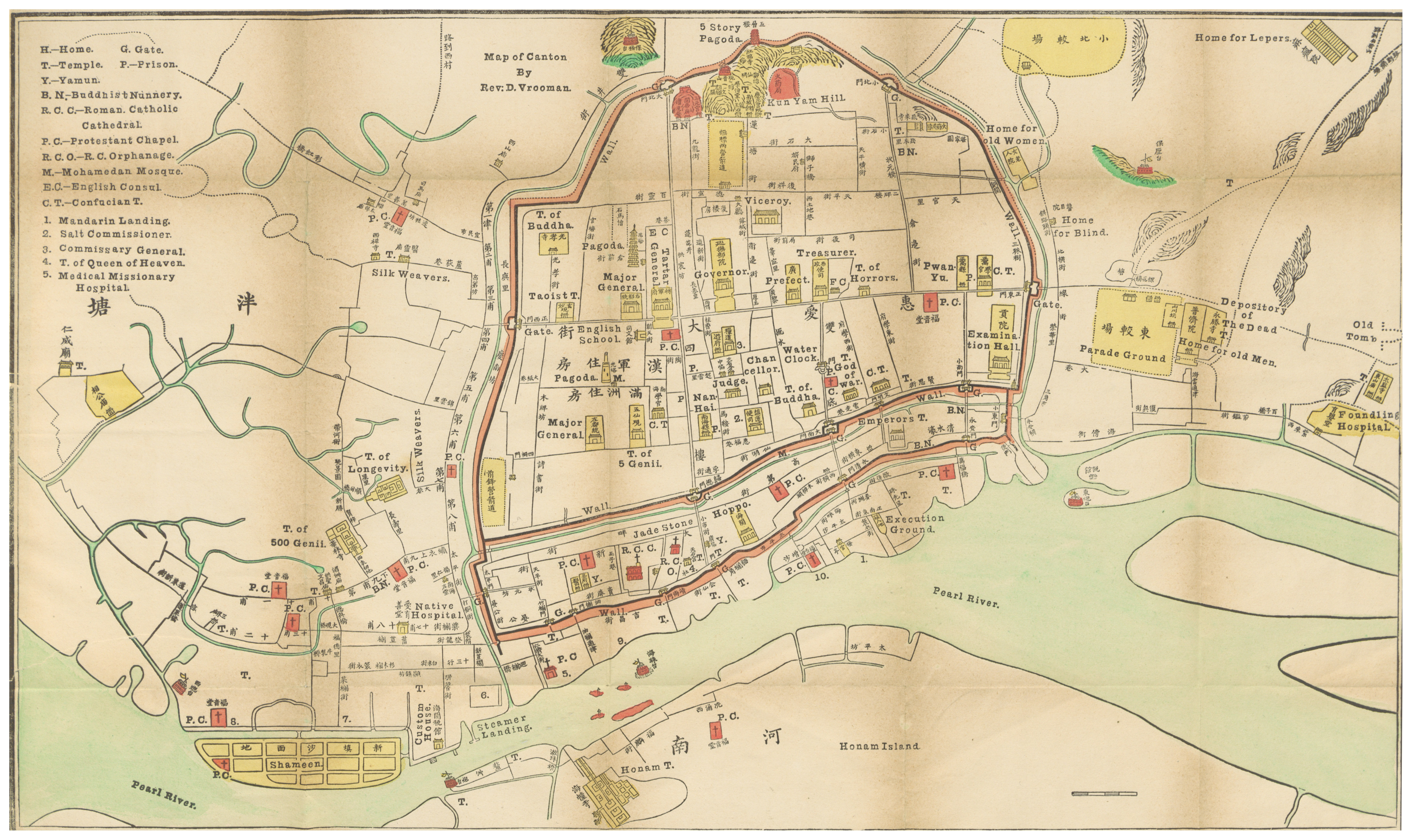
Kerr's map of Canton (1880)

=== Mission ===
Kerr believed that medical missionaries should influence political and social reforms. "To introduce these institutions into lands where they do not exist is an important part of the duty of medical missionaries." (Kerr, 1895, p. 11) Kerr regarded physicians as powerful and in a position of honor with the obligation to others because medicine is "a profession of benevolence." (Xu, 2011, p. 195).

Kerr also believed that American general practitioners needed to persuade the Chinese to abandon what was described as outdated and "hostile" customs in order to adopt Western culture and the natural laws. Kerr advocated free medical services for Chinese patients because he felt fees interfered with the healing of the sick and the spirit of Christianity.

"Vast as was his distinctly medical work, Dr. Kerr was above all things a missionary. He never lost an opportunity to preach Christ. Kindly, just, dignified in his manner, he was always at work doing good and commending Christ to the Chinese.... He was a missionary first, and all his medical knowledge was used to commend the Gospel."

— Robert E. Speer, Monthly Missionary Survey

==== Hospitals ====
===== Ophthalmic Hospital =====
Peter Parker established the Ophthalmic Hospital in Canton on November 4, 1835. After a few months, the hospital expanded to hold more than 200 people. The hospital performed the first ophthalmological surgery, the first ovariotomy, the first lithocystotomy, the first etherization, and the first pathological anatomy in China. The hospital also had China's first X-ray film shot and the first medical magazine printed. The Ophthalmic Hospital was later called the Boji Hospital. Kerr opened a Vaccine Department at the hospital in 1859, offering free smallpox vaccinations to Cantonese children. Kerr also published informational pamphlets on the importance of vaccinations.

===== Medical Missionary Society's Hospital =====
The Medical Missionary Society's Hospital was located on the Pearl River on Yan-tsai Street in Canton. It included 10 buildings and 300 patient beds. The hospital was managed and funded by the Medical Missionary Society. Peter Parker opened the Medical Missionary Society's Hospital in 1839 and was succeeded by John Kerr as physician in charge. John Myers Swan became superintendent in 1891 and pushed for medical modernization. Kerr believed the focus should remain on Evangelization. The division with Swan led Kerr to leave the Canton Hospital in 1899.

===== Mental hospital =====
Kerr retiring from the Canton Hospital in 1899, Kerr devoted his time to caring for the mentally ill. In China, it was public custom to treat for the person as a whole, including mental syndromes. The most common treatments in 19th century China included: shackles, fetters, herb medicines, acupuncture, toxin liquid therapy, and magic words or formulas.

In 1872, Kerr appealed to the Medical Missionary Society to build a mental hospital in China. Between 1876 and 1880, Kerr campaigned for the necessary and rightful treatment of patients with mental illnesses in their own, designated hospitals. Kerr believed in treating and curing the mentally ill rather than isolating them from society. However, neither the city government or the Canton Medical Missionary Society wanted to fund a mental hospital.

Kerr used his own money to purchase 17 acres in Fangcun (southwestern Canton) as a building site for the hospital. With donors and assistance, two buildings were erected . He attended to 50 patients at the hospital before his death. The John G. Kerr Refuge for the Insane operated until 1937.

==== Surgery and Hygiene ====
In Canton, Kerr performed around 48,918 surgeries; his specialty being lithotomy and lithotrity, the removal of gallstones from the urinary tract, bladder or kidney. He performed surgery on both civilians and officials throughout the Guangxi Province. The Canton Hospital was one of the first hospitals in China to practice preventive hygienic measures such as separation, disinfection, and sterilization. Kerr helped to introduce these modern techniques during his surgeries and strived for his hospital to be a model of cleanliness for the Cantonese not only in the hospital, but in their private lives as well. There were separate rooms for patients with contagious diseases and the patient's clothes and utensils were sterilized, along with the operating room itself.

In 1875, Kerr published Weisheng yaozhi (Essentials to Hygiene) which highlighted the priority of preventing illnesses through good hygiene. In this novel, Kerr also argued that hygiene was not just an individual problem, a large-scale attempt to undermine unhygienic habits and lifestyles required government regulations and law enforcement as well.

==== Anti-Opium Campaign ====
Kerr played a crucial role in condemning opium abuse in Canton. He published Opium Habits in 1889, in which he denounced opium smoking and declared distorted moral character a product of opium. Kerr opened up a ward of the Canton Hospital dedicated to treating patients (ages ranging 20–59 years) who were addicted to opium. He also attended the National Missionary Conference in Shanghai (1890), a forum in opposition of the opium trade. Following the conference, the Permanent Committee for the Promotion of Anti-Opium Societies was established and Kerr became a leading member.

The Committee resolved to continue their opposition to the opium traffic, urging Christians in China to arouse public opinion against it. The desire of the missionaries that their ideas be carried out caused them to form "continuation committees" that were assigned tasks to assure that action would be taken on whatever matters had been approved by the conferences.

==== Medical Journals ====
Kerr promoted medical education in China for both men and women. He taught many Chinese medical students and translated over 34 volumes of medical work into Chinese. Some of these medical students were women who trained in the Canton Hospital medical classes (1879-1899). Kerr was also elected as the first president of the CMMA (China Medical Missionary Association) in 1886 and served as the first editor of China Medical Missionary Journal. In 1886, Kerr established Guangzhou Xinbao (Canton's New Newspaper) and Xiyi xinbao (Western Healing News).

==== Works ====
- Kerr, John (1888). Select phrases in the Canton dialect (6 ed.). Kelly & Walsh.
- Kerr, John (1974). A Guide to the City and Suburbs of Canton. San Francisco: Chinese Materials Center, INC.

== Legacy ==
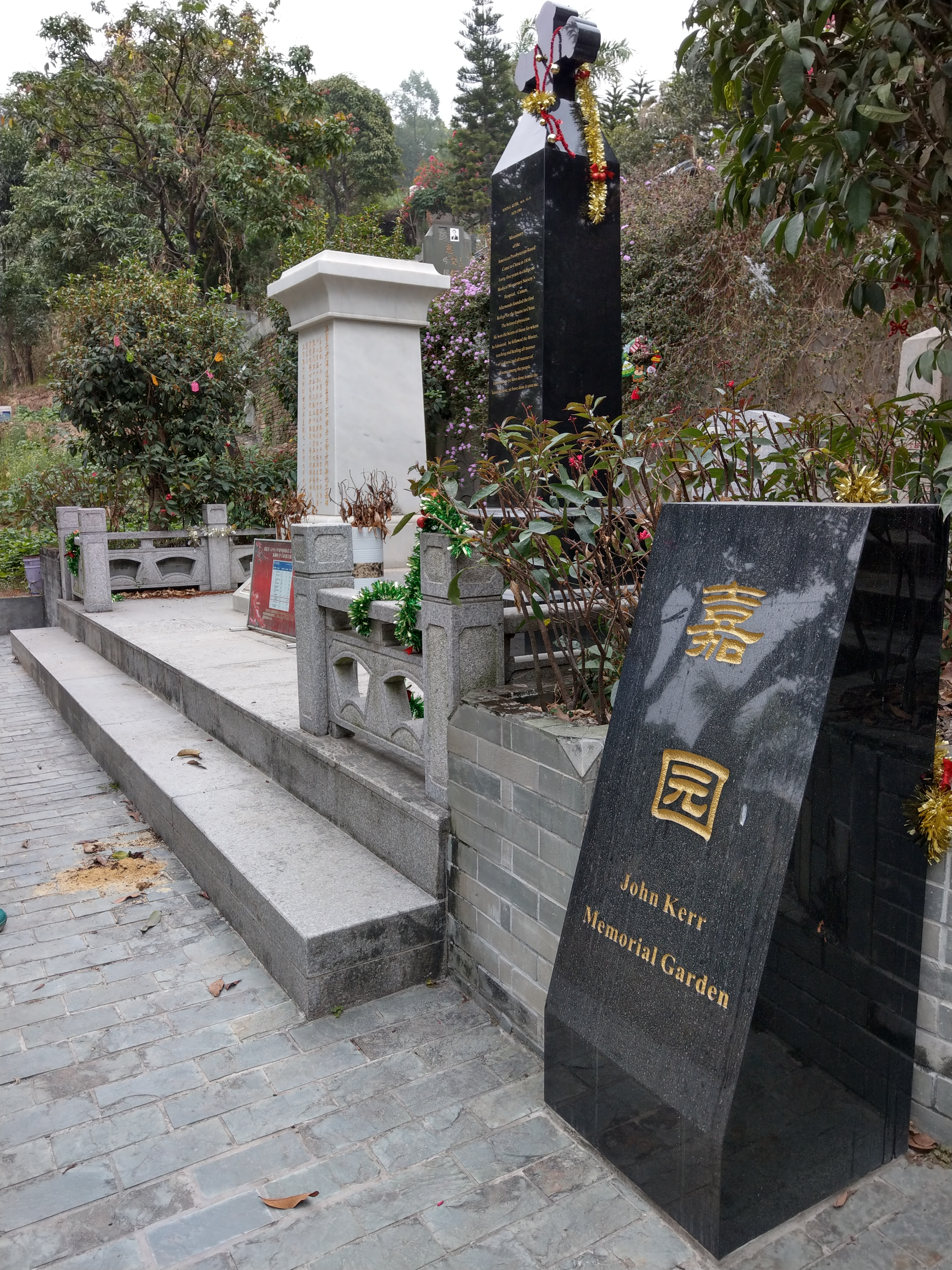
John Kerr Memorial Garden, Guangzhou (Grave of John Glasgow Kerr)

Kerr died in Canton at age 77, after spending 47 years in that city. He was buried in the Protestant cemetery outside Canton. Thousands of mourners attended his funeral. However, during 1950's, the cemetery was removed for the purpose of town development. The current memorial garden of J. Kerr was built in 2013~14.
