= Peter Parker (physician) =

American physician & missionary (1804–1888)

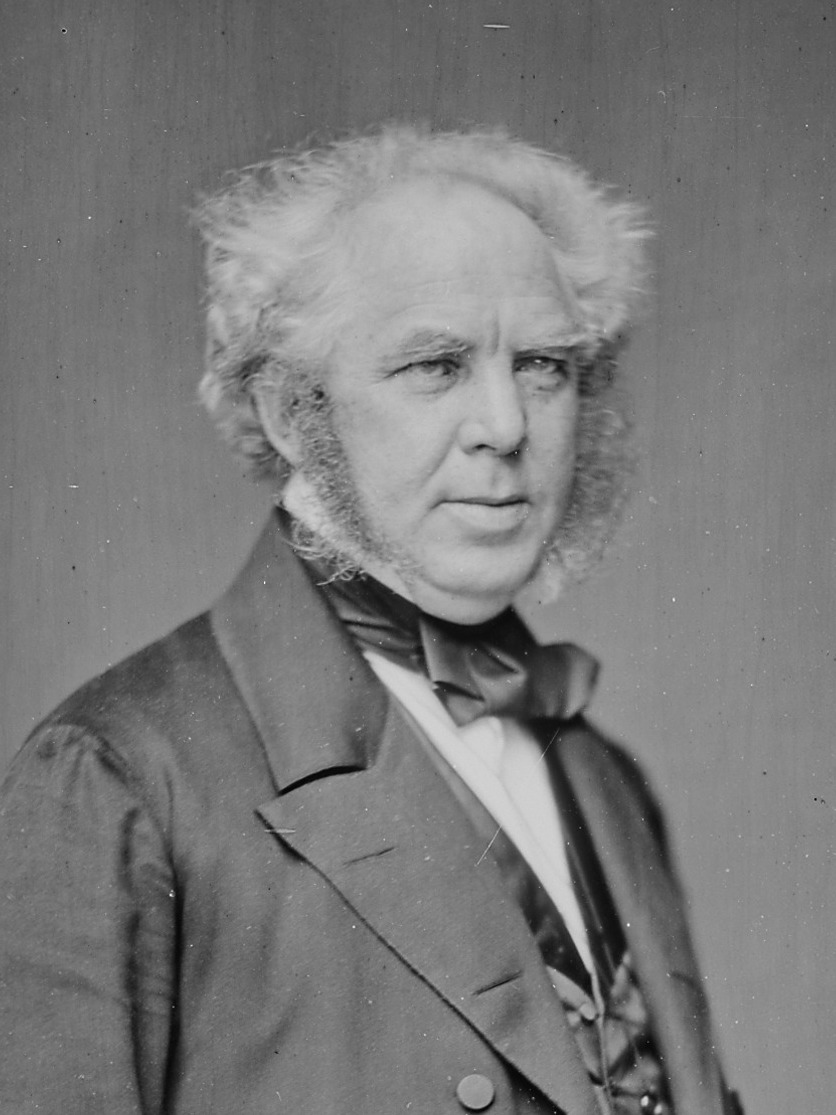
- Born: June 18, 1804
- Died: January 10, 1888
- Occupations: Medical doctor, missionary

Peter Parker (June 18, 1804 – January 10, 1888) was an American medical doctor and a missionary who introduced Western medical techniques into Qing dynasty China, at the city of Canton. It was said that Parker "opened China to the gospel at the point of a lancet."

== Early life ==
Parker was born in Framingham, Massachusetts, in 1804 to an orthodox Congregational family. His parents were farmers. Parker received a B.A. degree from Yale University in 1831, and his M.D. degree from the Yale Medical School, then called Medical Institution of Yale College, in 1834. In January 1834, he completed his theological studies at Yale and was ordained as a Presbyterian minister.

== China ==
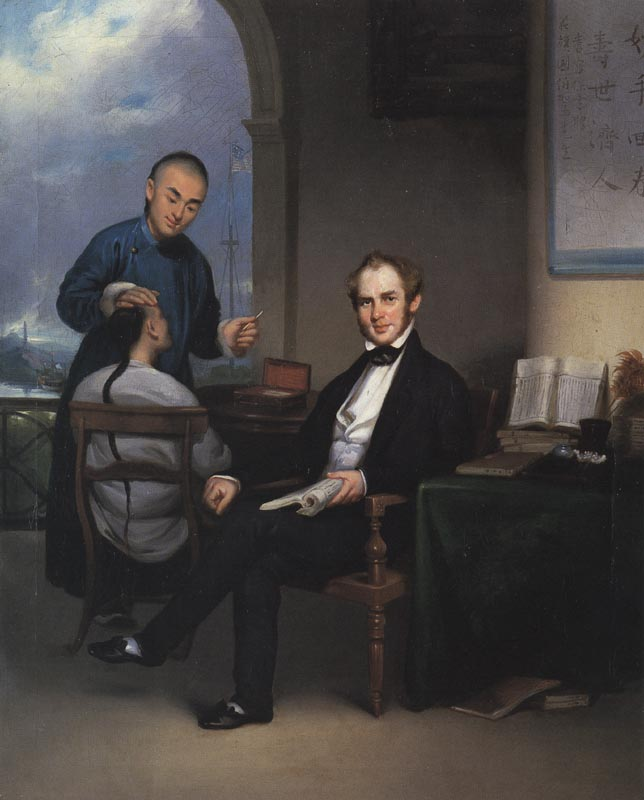
Portrait of Parker by Lam Qua

In February 1834, Parker (phoneticized in Cantonese: 伯駕) traveled to Canton, where he had the distinction of being the first full-time Protestant medical missionary to China. In 1835, he opened in that city the Ophthalmic Hospital, which later became the Guangzhou Boji Hospital (the Canton Hospital). Parker specialized in diseases of the eye, including cataracts, and also resected tumors. Parker also introduced Western anesthesia in the form of sulphuric ether.

Although the hospital was intended particularly for the treatment of eye diseases, it was soon found impracticable to exclude patients with other maladies. Over 2,000 patients were admitted the first year. Parker often preached to the patients, and trained several Chinese students in the arts of medicine and surgery, some of whom attained considerable skill.

Merchant David Olyphant of Olyphant & Co. allowed Parker to use one of his warehouses as a hospital "so that patients could come and go without annoying foreigners by passing through their hongs, or excite the observations of natives by being seen to resort to a foreigner's house, rendered it most suitable for the purpose."

In 1840, on the occurrence of hostilities between England and China, the hospital was closed, and Parker returned to the United States. He met and married Harriet Colby Webster during this time period. Returning to China with his new wife in 1842, he reopened the hospital, and it was thronged as before. He served as president of the Medical Missionary Society of China after his mentor Thomas Richardson Colledge. John Glasgow Kerr followed Parker in running the Medical Missionary Society Hospital.

In 1844, Parker worked as Caleb Cushing's main interpreter during the negotiations of the Treaty of Wanghia with the Qing Empire. In 1845 he became a secretary and interpreter to the new embassy from the United States, still keeping the hospital in operation. In the absence of the minister, Parker acted as chargé d'affaires. In 1855, finding his health seriously impaired, he again returned to the United States.

The 1844 treaty stipulated that it could be renegotiated after 12 years, and in 1856, president Franklin Pierce sent Parker to China in order to revise the treaty and gain more concessions from the Qing Empire. Parker was unsuccessful in this endeavor. He worked in this capacity until Pierce left office. In 1857, his health again failing, he returned to the United States.

=== Lam Qua portraits ===
While in China, Parker met Lam Qua, a Western-trained Chinese painter. Parker commissioned Lam Qua to paint patients at the Canton Hospital with large tumors or other major deformities. Some of the paintings are part of a collection of Lam Qua's work held by the Peter Parker Collection at the Harvey Cushing/John Hay Whitney Medical Library at Yale University. Parker left these portraits to the Pathology Department of the Yale Medical School, which later gave them to the library.

== United States ==
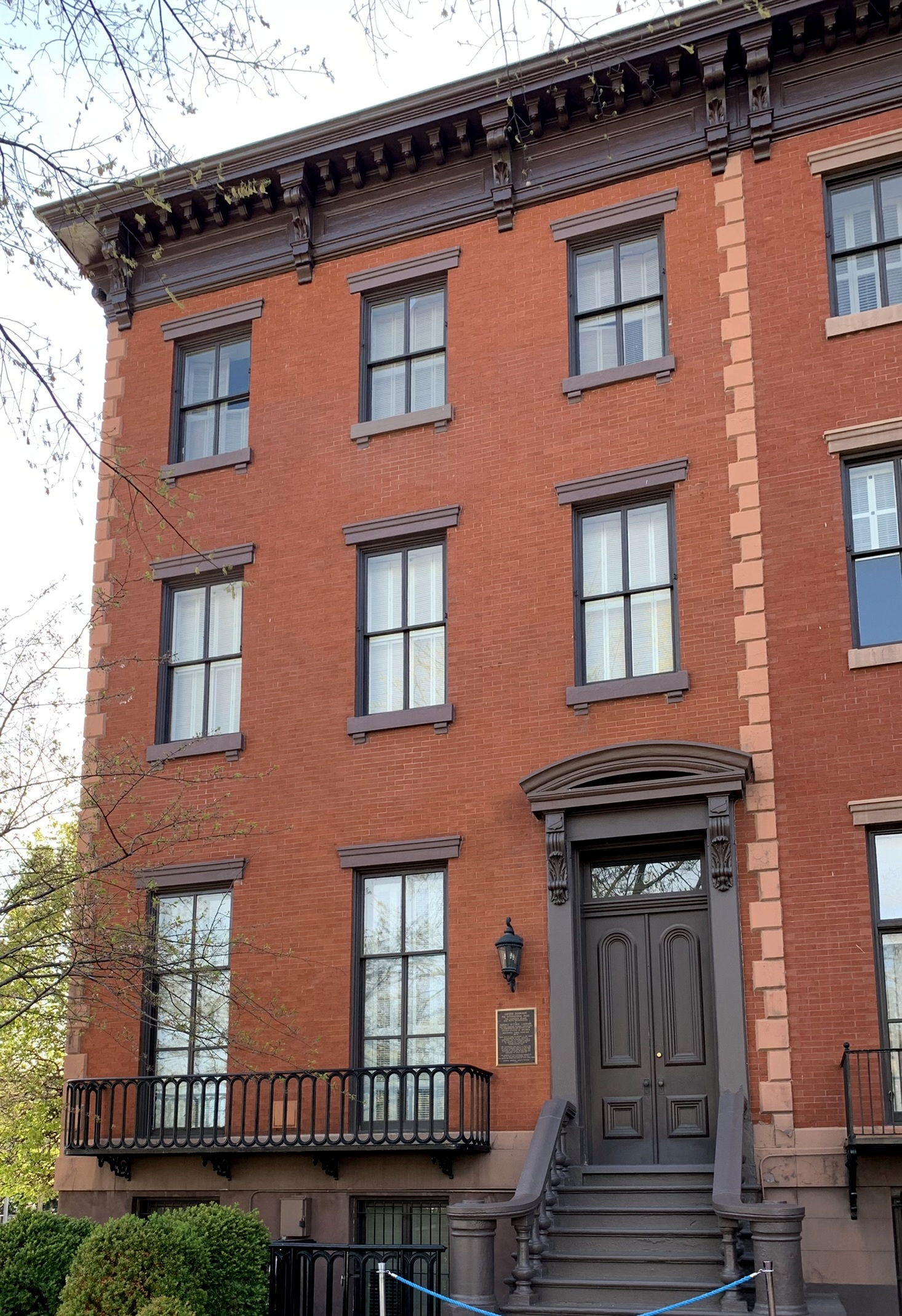
Parker's former residence in Washington, D.C.

After his final return to the United States, Parker and Harriet had one son, Peter Parker Jr., in 1859. In the 1860s, the couple moved to the townhome on Lafayette Square that is known today as the Peter Parker House. From here the couple regularly hosted notable figures in Washington, including Supreme Court justices, members of Congress, and President Abraham Lincoln.

Parker became a regent of the Smithsonian Institution in 1868, a corporate member of the American Board in 1871, and was a delegate of the Evangelical Alliance to Russia the same year to memorialise Tsar Alexander II on behalf of religious liberty in the Baltic provinces. He was instrumental in the campaign against Chinese Coolie labour, and the U.S. government’s involvement with the trafficking of coolies to the Caribbean and Latin America. He was president of the Washington branch of the Evangelical Alliance in 1887. He died on January 10, 1888, in Washington, D.C.

== Writings ==
Among his publications were:

- Reports of the Ophthalmic Hospital at Canton (Canton, 1836–52)
- Journal of an Expedition from Singapore to Japan, an account of his visit to the Loo Choo islands and Japan in 1837 (London, 1838)
- A Statement Respecting Hospitals in China (London, 1841)
- Notes of Surgical Practice Among the Chinese (1846)
- Eulogy on Henry Wilson (Washington, D. C., 1880)
