= Sun Yat-sen Memorial Hospital =

Public hospital in Guangzhou, Guangdong, China

Sun Yat-sen Memorial Hospital 中山大学孙逸仙纪念医院
- Sun Yat-Sen University
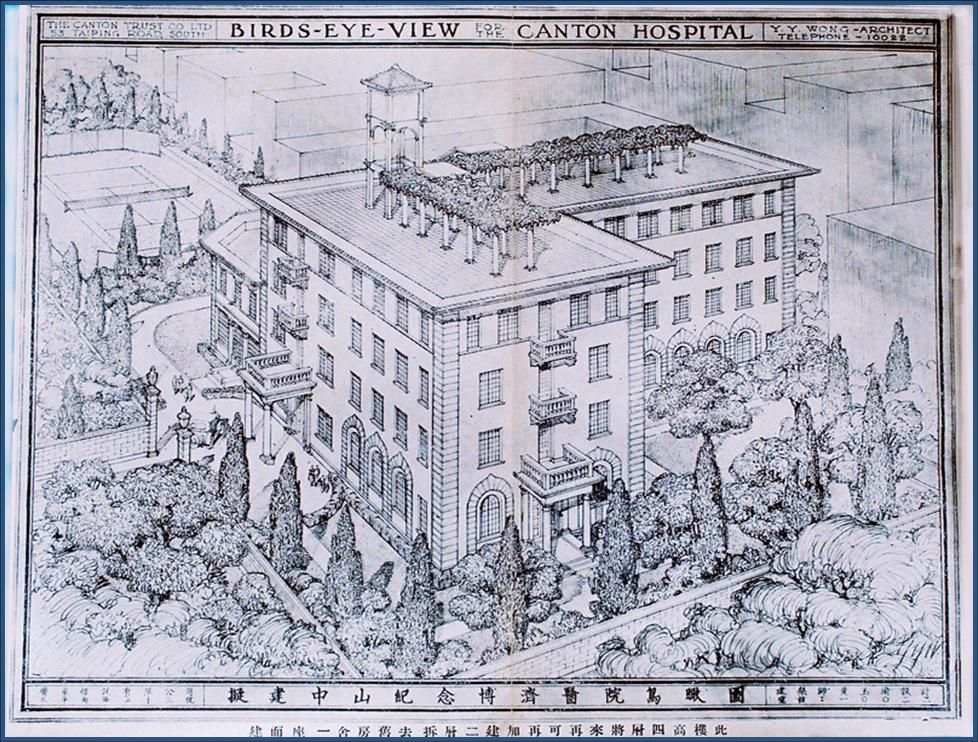
- A birds eye view of the Canton Hospital (1930s)

Geography
- Location: Yuexiu, Guangzhou, Guangdong, China
- Coordinates: 23.109500°N 113.255731°E

Organisation
- Care system: Public
- Affiliated university: Sun Yat-Sen University

History
- Former name: Ophthalmic Hospital in Canton
- Opened: 1835

Links
- Website: www.gzsys.org.cn
- Lists: Hospitals in China

Sun Yat-sen Memorial Hospital (中山大学孙逸仙纪念医院) is a public hospital affiliated with Sun Yat-sen University in Guangzhou, Guangdong, China.

The hospital traces its history to the Ophthalmic Hospital in Canton, opened by American missionary physician Peter Parker on 4 November 1835. Under Parker's successor, John Glasgow Kerr, the institution became known as Boji Hospital and established the Boji Medical School in 1866. Sun Yat-sen received medical training there in 1886.

Following a series of changes in the organization of medical education in Guangzhou during the 20th century, the hospital became part of the medical institutions associated with Sun Yat-sen University. After Sun Yat-sen University and the Sun Yat-sen University of Medical Science merged in 2001, the then Boji Hospital became Sun Yat-sen Memorial Hospital, also known as the Second Affiliated Hospital of Sun Yat-sen University.

== History ==
=== Ophthalmic Hospital in Canton ===
Peter Parker, a physician and Presbyterian missionary educated at Yale University, arrived in Guangzhou in 1834. On 4 November 1835 he opened the Ophthalmic Hospital in Canton near the foreign factories on the Pearl River. The premises were owned by the merchant Wu Bingjian (Howqua), who allowed the hospital to use the property without rent.

Although the institution initially concentrated on eye disease, it also accepted selected patients with other conditions. During its first three months, Parker treated 1,061 patients, of whom 1,020 had ocular disorders. The hospital was connected with the development of Protestant medical missionary activity in southern China, in which medical treatment was used alongside missionary work.

Parker later entered American diplomatic service. In 1855, John Glasgow Kerr, an American physician and Presbyterian medical missionary, succeeded him as head of the hospital. Under Kerr, the institution increasingly treated patients with diseases outside ophthalmology and became known as Boji Hospital (博济医院).

=== Boji Hospital ===
In 1866, Boji Hospital (博济医院) established the Boji Medical School. The school provided Western-style medical instruction to Chinese students at a time when institutional medical education of this kind was still limited in China. Kerr also translated Western medical texts into Chinese and trained Chinese medical students.

Sun Yat-sen studied medicine at the school in 1886 before continuing his education at the Hong Kong College of Medicine for Chinese. The association with Sun later became part of the hospital's modern name.

The Boji Medical School encountered recurrent difficulties involving funding, teaching materials, faculty recruitment and language, and it closed in 1914. The hospital itself continued to operate as a general medical institution.

In 1928, Chinese educator Chung Wing Kwong became the administrator of Boji Hospital. In 1936, the hospital became associated with the College of Medicine of Lingnan University.

=== PRC eras ===
In 1953, the College of Medicine of Lingnan University and the Medical College of Sun Yat-sen University were merged to form the College of Medicine of South China; the Guangdong Guanghua College of Medicine was incorporated the following year. The resulting medical institution subsequently operated under several names, including Guangzhou Medical College and Zhongshan Medical College.

The historical ophthalmology service of the hospital also contributed to the development of specialist ophthalmic institutions in Guangzhou. An ophthalmic hospital associated with Zhongshan Medical College opened in 1965, and in 1983 the Eye Hospital, Eye Research Institute and Office of Prevention of Blindness were combined as the Zhongshan Ophthalmic Center.

Zhongshan Medical College became Sun Yat-sen University of Medical Science in 1985. In 2001, that university merged with Sun Yat-sen University. The former Boji Hospital subsequently operated as Sun Yat-sen Memorial Hospital and the Second Affiliated Hospital of Sun Yat-sen University.

=== Superintendents of Canton Hospital ===
- 1835-1855 Peter Parker
- 1855-1899 John Glasgow Kerr (except during his furloughs)
- 1867 Wong Fun (from April through December)
- 1876-1878 Fleming Carrow
- 1884-1885 Joseph Clarke Thomson
- 1893 John M. Swan and Mary West Niles
- 1899-1914 John M. Swan (except during his furloughs)
- 1905-1906 Paul J. Todd
- 1912-1913 J. Oscar Thomson

After 1914, Chairman of Staff taking the place of Superintendent

- 1914-1915 William W. Cadbury
- 1915-1916 John Kirk
- 1916-1917 J. Oscar Thomson
- 1917-1918 James M. Wright
- 198-1919 J. Oscar Thomson
- 1919-1920 Charles A. Hayes
- 1920-1921 John Kirk
- 1921-1924 James M. Wright
- 1925-1928 J. Oscar Thomson
- 1929-1930 Paul J. Todd

Superintendent- Appointed by the Board of Directors of Lingnan University

- 1930-1931 William W. Cadbury
- 1931-1932 J. Oscar Thomson
- 1932-1935 William W. Cadbury
- 1935 Wong Man

== Campuses ==
The hospital's historical main site, now generally referred to as the North Campus, is at 107 Yanjiang West Road in Yuexiu District, beside the Pearl River. The hospital also operates a South Campus in Haizhu. By 2024, Guangdong media described its broader hospital system as comprising the North, South, Huadu and Shenshan sites, together with the Haizhu Bay Campus then under construction.

=== Shenshan Medical Center ===
The Shenshan Medical Center (深汕中心医院), in Shanwei, was developed with support from provincial and municipal authorities and is managed with participation from Sun Yat-sen Memorial Hospital. Its outpatient service began in May 2021 and its inpatient department formally opened in October of that year.

In 2022, the Shenshan Medical Center was included among a group of projects approved as National Regional Medical Centers, a Chinese government programme intended to expand access to specialist medical services outside the largest metropolitan centres.

=== Huadu Campus ===
Plans for a hospital in Huadu originated in a 2013 agreement among the Huadu district government, Sun Yat-sen University, and Sun Yat-sen Memorial Hospital. The hospital was initially named Sun Yat-sen University Renji Hospital. In 2024, following approval from the National Health Commission, it was renamed the Huadu Campus of Sun Yat-sen Memorial Hospital.

The Huadu Campus began clinical operations on 18 December 2024. It was designed as a 1,000-bed Grade 3A comprehensive hospital, with approximately 170,000 square metres of floor space.

=== Haizhu Bay Campus ===
The Haizhu Bay Campus is a major expansion project in Haizhu District. The National Health Commission approved a development plan providing for the campus to be built in phases. Construction of the first phase began in September 2024. The first phase was planned to have a gross floor area of approximately 238,000 square metres and to contain the principal clinical facilities, including outpatient, emergency and inpatient buildings.

== Medical education and research ==
As an affiliated hospital of Sun Yat-sen University, Sun Yat-sen Memorial Hospital combines clinical services with medical education and biomedical research. Its educational history is associated with the Boji Medical School established in 1866, although the organization and curriculum of the modern university medical system developed through later institutional mergers rather than through an uninterrupted continuation of the original school.

The hospital has research units in a range of clinical and biomedical fields. Its researchers publish through Sun Yat-sen University affiliations in areas including oncology, surgery, internal medicine and translational medicine. The institution is separately listed as a research organization in the Nature Index.

== 2023 laboratory-safety scrutiny ==
In November 2023, the hospital attracted public attention after reports that three people who had previously studied or worked in a laboratory associated with its Breast Tumor Center had been diagnosed with different cancers during 2023. The cases prompted online speculation about whether laboratory conditions or occupational exposure had contributed to the illnesses. Contemporary reporting noted that no causal relationship between the laboratory and the cancers had been established.

The hospital said that three former laboratory members had developed cancer and stated that it would welcome an evaluation or investigation by third-party organizations. During the controversy, part of the laboratory's storage or laboratory space was dismantled, which drew further public attention. Caixin reported that university personnel confirmed the closure of a laboratory but did not state that it was connected to the cancer diagnoses. The episode led to broader discussion in Chinese science media about laboratory safety and occupational-health practices for graduate students and researchers.
