= David Olyphant =

American trader

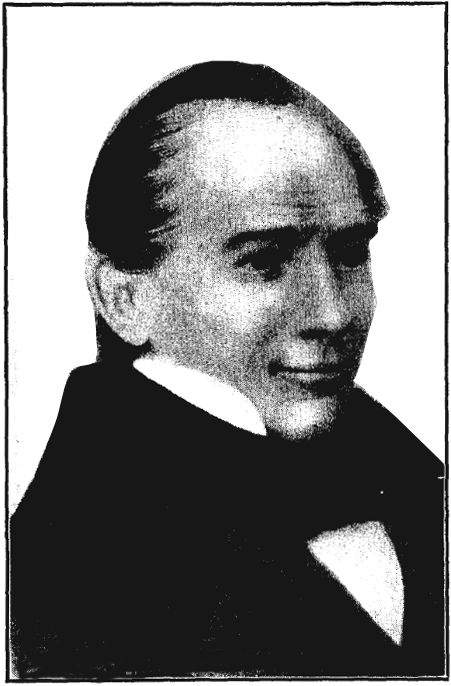
- Born: David Washington Cincinnatus Olyphant; March 7, 1789; Newport, Rhode Island
- Died: June 10, 1851 (aged 62); Cairo, Egypt
- Occupation: Businessman
- Spouse: Ann Archer McKenzie
- Children: Robert Morrison Olyphant
- Relatives: Richard Ward (great-grandfather) Timothy Olyphant (3x great-grandson)

David Washington Cincinnatus Olyphant (March 7, 1789 – June 10, 1851) was an American trader in the Far East and "the father of the American Mission to China". He was an elected member of the American Board of Commissioners for Foreign Missions (ABCFM), the organization that sent the first American missionaries to China in 1829.

== Early life ==
Born in Newport, Rhode Island, he was the son of Dr. David Olyphant, a Scottish supporter of Bonnie Prince Charlie, who arrived in America in the 1740s shortly after the Battle of Culloden, and Ann (née Vernon) Olyphant, granddaughter of Richard Ward, governor of Rhode Island.

In 1806, following the death of his father, he went to New York where he worked for the firm of King and Talbot, who were involved in the China trade. After living in Baltimore between 1812 and 1817, he returned to New York where in 1820 he became an agent of Thomas H. Smith of Canton (now Guangzhou), China.

== China ==
On behalf of King and Talbot, Olyphant arrived in Canton in 1820, where he met the Scottish missionary Robert Morrison. Thereafter he began a long-term involvement with Protestant missionary endeavors in China. Olyphant returned to China following the birth of his son Robert Morrison Olyphant to find the man after whom he had named his son alone in Canton and suffering from chronic depression following the death of his fellow missionary William Milne. Delays by the London Missionary Society in sending Morrison assistance led to Olyphant writing to the American Board of Commissioners for Foreign Missions (ABCFM) with the news that his ship Roman would be departing for Canton in December 1829, and "if a missionary could be sent out in her, the passage should be free." As a result, the chosen individual, Elijah Coleman Bridgman, became the first American Protestant Christian missionary in China. Olyphant offered all subsequent missionaries free passage on his ships and free lodgings in Canton as well as supporting the locally produced newspaper The Canton Register. In addition, Olyphant allowed the physician and missionary Peter Parker to use one of his warehouses as a hospital "so that patients could come and go without annoying foreigners by passing through their hongs, or excite the observations of natives by being seen to resort to a foreigner's house, rendered it most suitable for the purpose."

On November 29, 1834, Olyphant, along with James Matheson, William Wetmore, James Innes, Thomas Fox, Elijah Coleman Bridgman, Karl Gützlaff and John Robert Morrison, formed a committee to inaugurate the Society for the Diffusion of Useful Knowledge in China.

In 1838, Olyphant was elected to the board of the ABCFM.

In 1842, Samuel Wells Williams, an American Sinologist, described him as a "steady and munificent friend of all efforts for the good of China".

== Olyphant & Co. ==
In 1828, along with Charles N. Talbot, Olyphant founded the trading house Olyphant & Co. in Canton, trading in "silk, mattings and fancy articles" after their former employer King and Talbot went bankrupt. The new firm was unusual in that it eschewed the opium trade unlike many of its contemporary competitors.

== Death ==
Forced by ill-health to leave China for the US, Olyphant died en route in Cairo, Egypt, on June 10, 1851.

== Offspring ==
Olyphant's son Robert Morrison Olyphant joined his father at Olyphant & Co. and was later progressively Assistant President, Vice-President, and for twenty years President of the Delaware and Hudson Canal Company (later the Delaware and Hudson Railway).

His great-great-great-grandson is actor Timothy Olyphant.

== Notes ==
1. Olyphant's second two forenames were in honor of George Washington and the Roman statesman Cincinnatus
