= Fat Tong Chau =

Former island of Hong Kong

Coordinates: 22.280025°N 114.268158°E

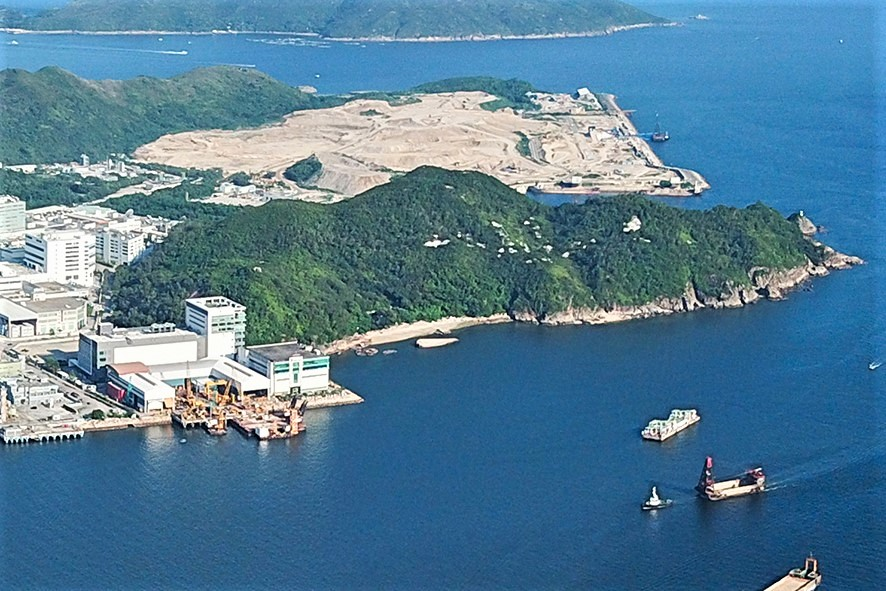
View of Fat Tong Chau across Junk Bay in June 2018.

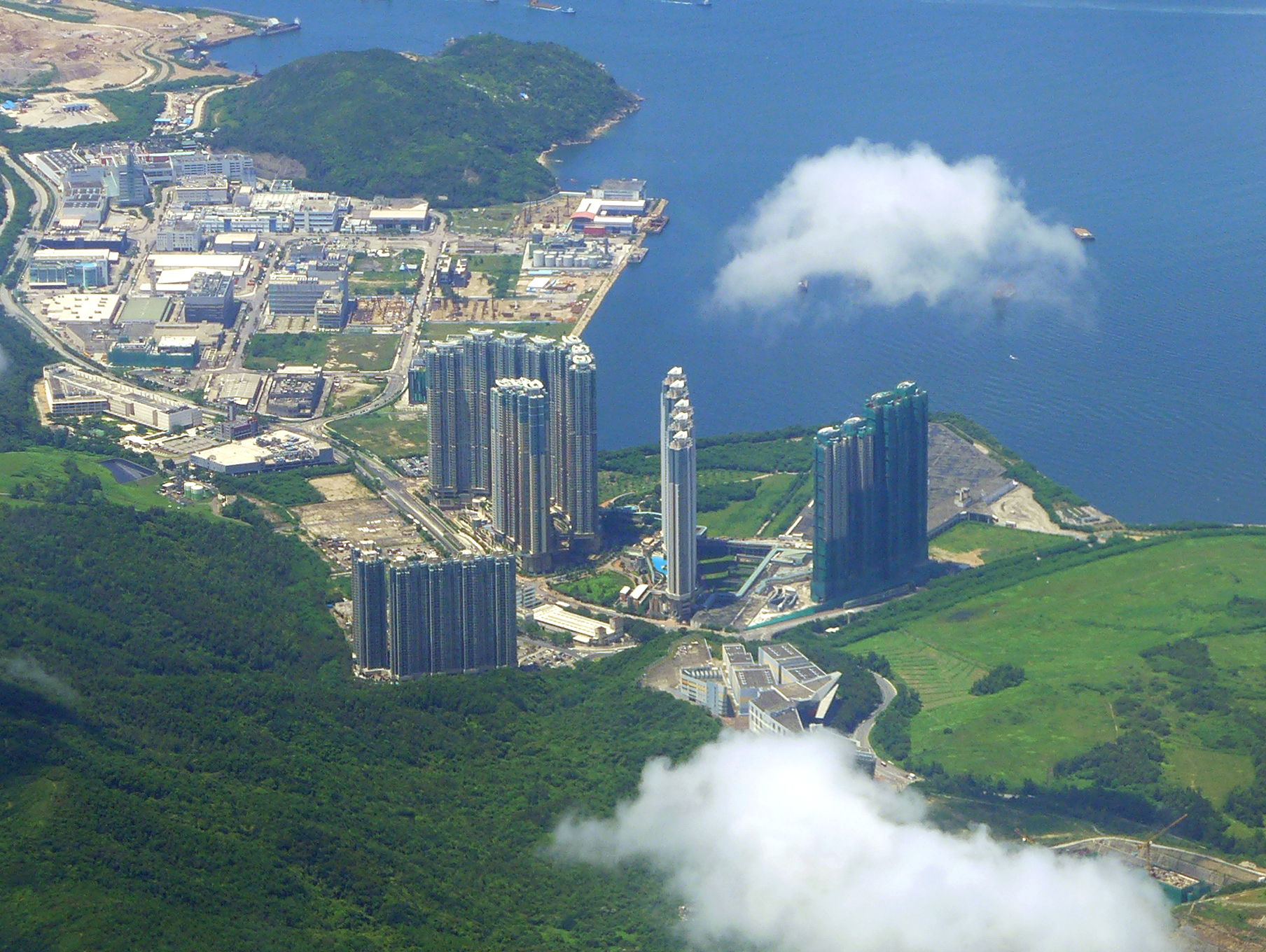
View of LOHAS Park and Tseung Kwan O Industrial Estate. Fat Tong Chau is visible in the top left part of the picture.

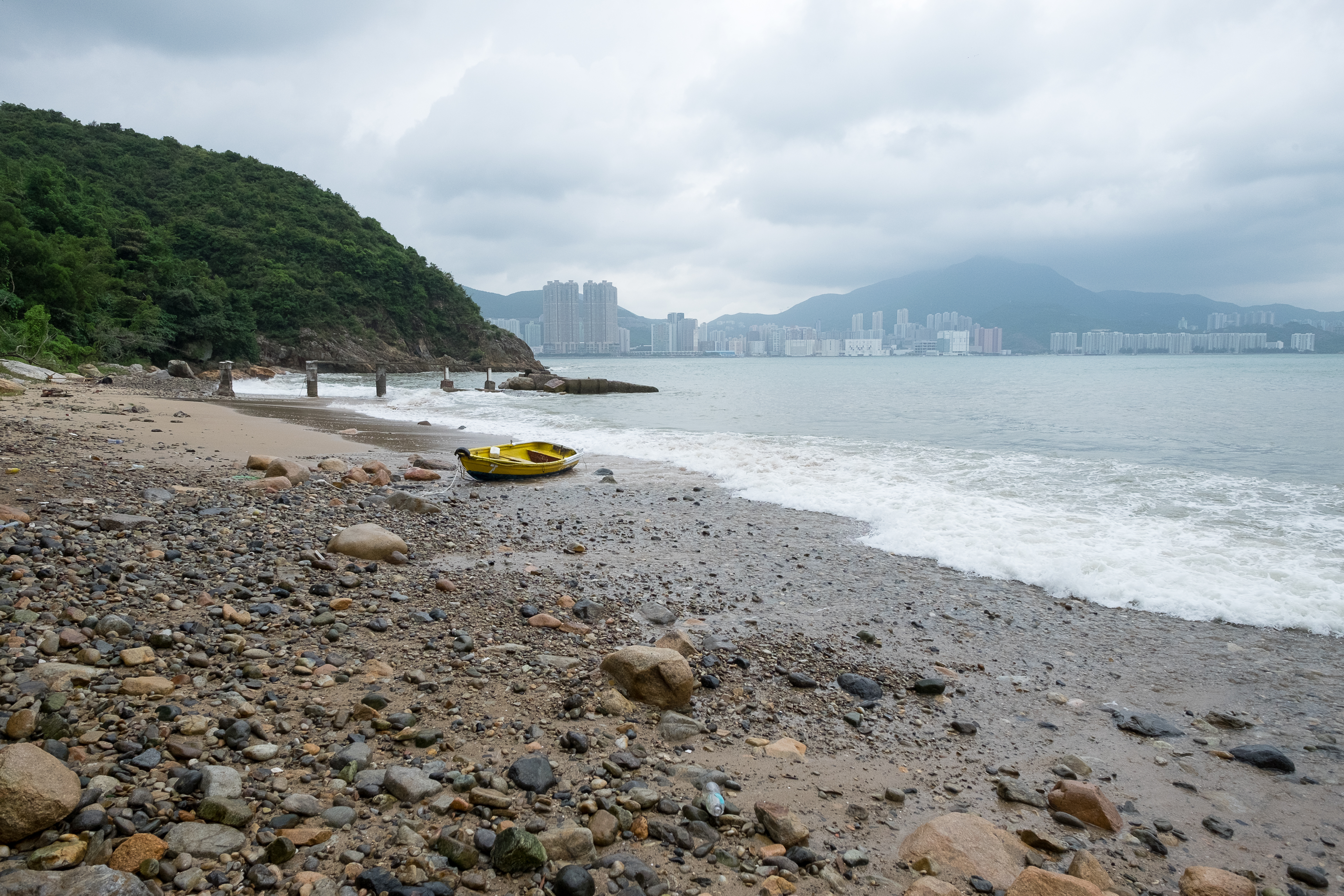
Site of Chinese Customs Station at Fat Tong Chau in October 2015

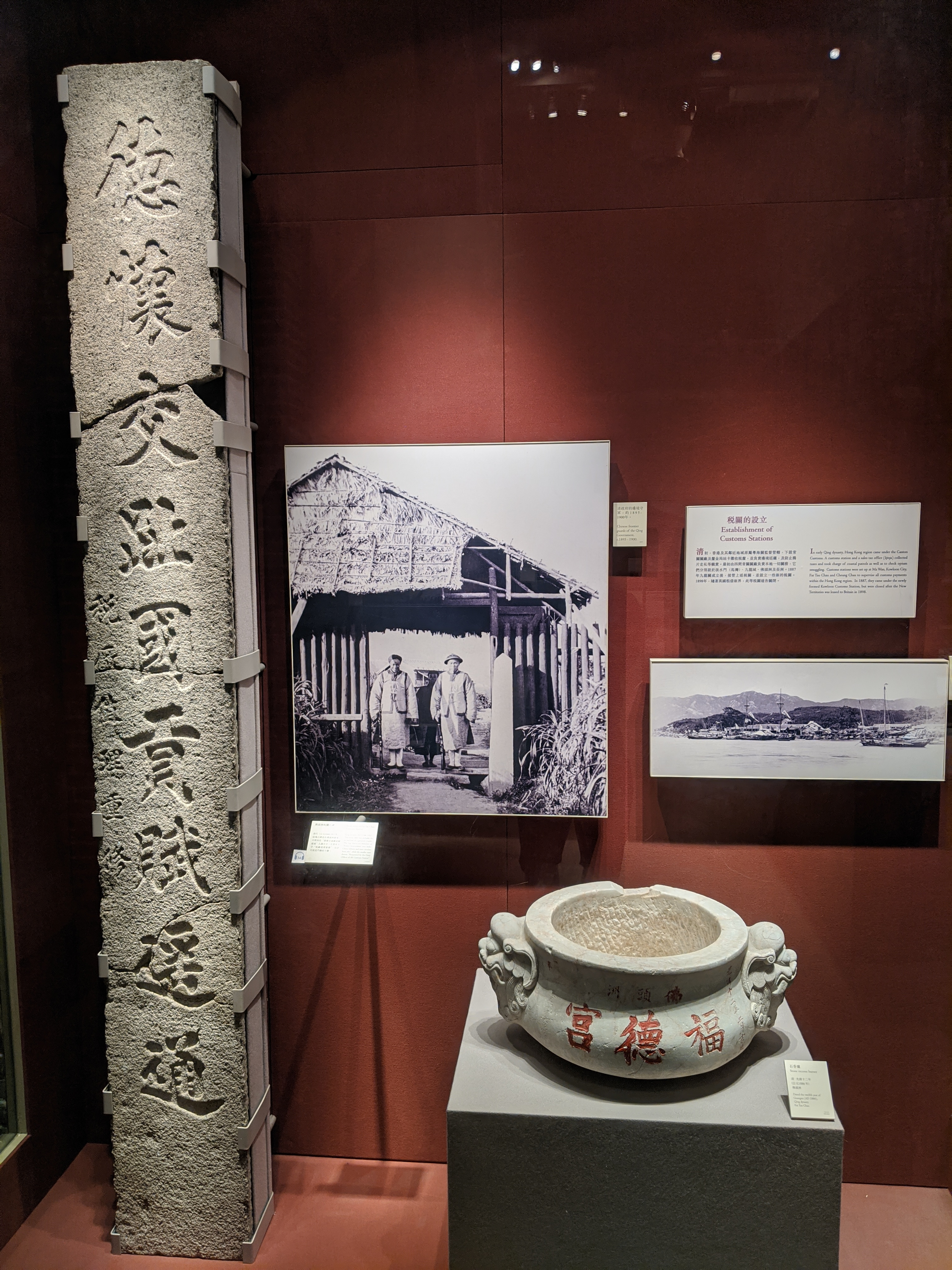
Objects from Fat Tong Chau displayed at the Hong Kong Museum of History in May 2020.

Fat Tong Chau (Chinese: 佛堂洲; lit. 'Buddhist Hall Island'), also known as Junk Island in English, and formerly called Fat Tau Chau (佛頭洲; 'Buddhist Head Island') or Fu Tau Chau (斧頭洲; 'Axe Head Island'), is a former island of Hong Kong. It is now part of Tseung Kwan O (also called Junk Bay) and Clear Water Bay Peninsula, Sai Kung as a result of land reclamation. It is located in the southeastern part of Junk Bay.

== Location ==
Fat Tong Chau is located south of the Tseung Kwan O Industrial Estate and directly west of TVB City. The South East New Territories Landfill (SENT) is located south of Fat Tong Chau. Before land reclamation, Fat Tong Chau formed the northern boundary of Tathong Channel.

== History ==
A village was historically located on the island. It had a population of 12 in 1911. Austin Coates noted that the village had been founded around 1885 and that it had a population of 23 in 1955, with the villagers having the surname Ip. James Hayes noted in 1957-1958 that the village had a population of 34. The sources of livelihood were reportedly grass-cutting, sweet potatoes, pigs, ducks and chickens. Most children were attending school at Pan Long Wan, where the Ip of Fu Tau Chau had intermarried with members of the Lau clan. The island was connected to other places by sampan, including to Shau Kei Wan, the principal market for the agricultural production of the village.

The village was resited to the present Fat Tau Chau village in the early 1990s, together with the nearby Tin Ha Wan Village, that was originally located on the peninsula. The island was connected to the Clear Water Bay Peninsula during the land reclamation work part of the development of Tseung Kwan O New Town in the mid 1990s.

== Archeological sites ==
The site of the Fat Tau Chau Old Chinese Customs Station, a declared monument of Hong Kong, is located in the northwestern part of Fat Tong Chau. Discovered in 1962, the ruin is regarded as a customs station following the discovery of a stone slab broken into four pieces bearing the inscriptions: "By the Grace (of the Emperor), tributes are accepted from and customs exchange with Annam, which is far away (from China). Renovated by the Manager of the Customs Station". Customs stations had been established in 1868 at Fat Tau Chau, Cheung Chau and Kap Shui Mun (Ma Wan), by order of the Viceroy of Liangguang, to collect likin on opium trade in the context of intense opium smuggling. The stations ceased to operate in 1899 after the lease of the New Territories to Britain.

Additionally, three Sites of Archeological Interest (SAI) are located at Fat Tong Chau: Fat Tau Chau SAI, Fat Tau Chau House Ruin and Fat Tau Chau Qing Dynasty Gravestone.

Archaeological finds from the site are being exhibited at Hong Kong Museum of History, including the "Foster benevolence over Indo-China; tributes and taxes circulate from afar" stone tablet.

== See also ==
- Fat Tong Mun
