= Tathong Channel =

Eastern sea water area in Hong Kong

Coordinates: 22°15′42″N 114°15′59″E

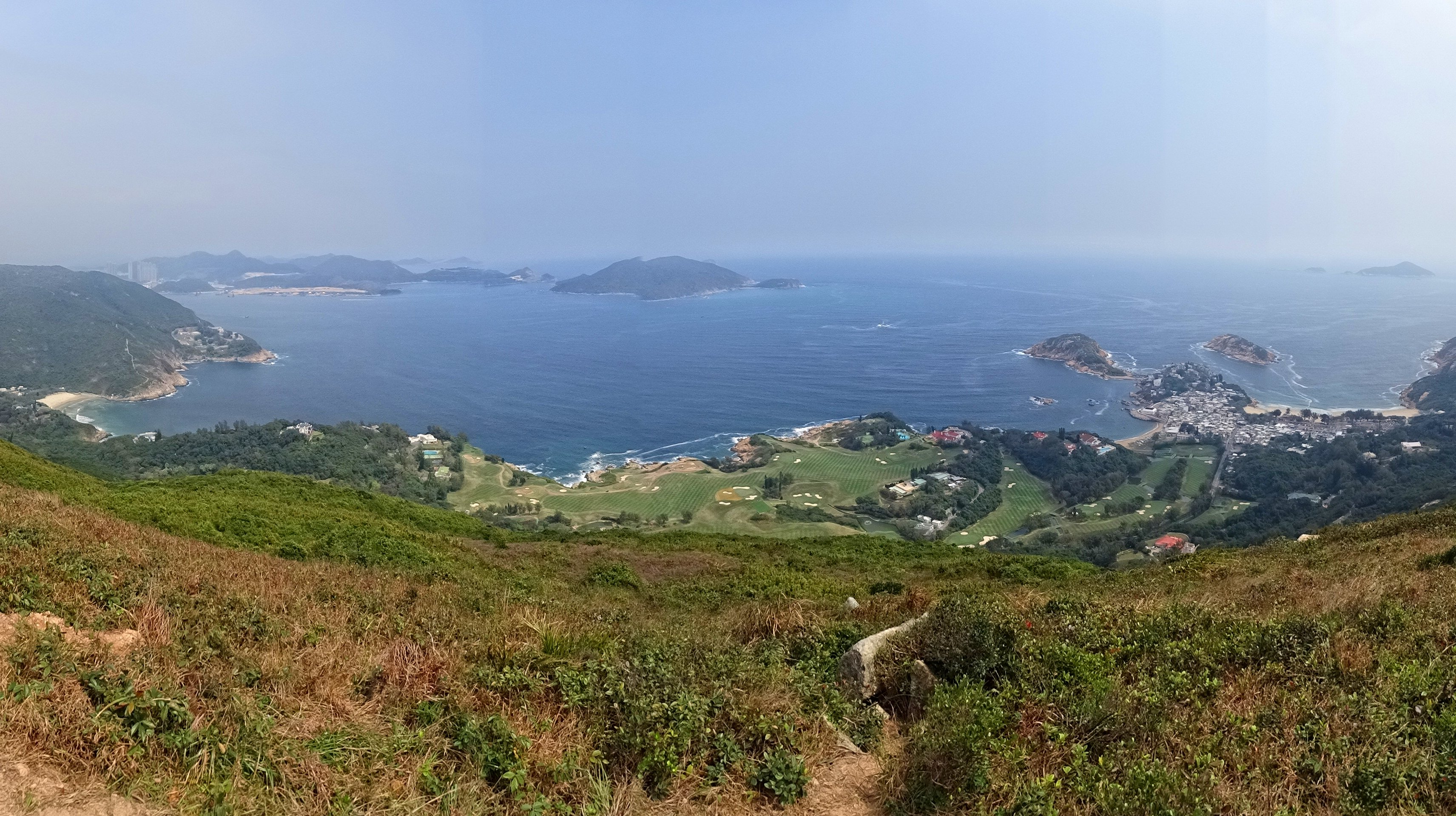
View of Tathong Channel, showing view from west towards the east.

Tathong Channel (Chinese: 大東門), also known as Nam Tong Hoi Hap (藍塘海峽, originally 南堂海峽), refers to the eastern sea water area in Hong Kong leading into Victoria Harbour through Lei Yue Mun, bounded by Junk Island (Fat Tong Chau) and Tung Lung Chau in the east, and Hong Kong Island in the west.

== History ==
On the 2nd of September 1977, a Transmeridian Air Cargo Canadair CL-44 lost control shortly after taking of from Kai Tak Airport due to a fire on the no. 4 engine with it crashing into the Tathong Channel killing 4 crew onboard.
