= Old China Trade =

Early commerce between the Chinese Qing Empire and the US

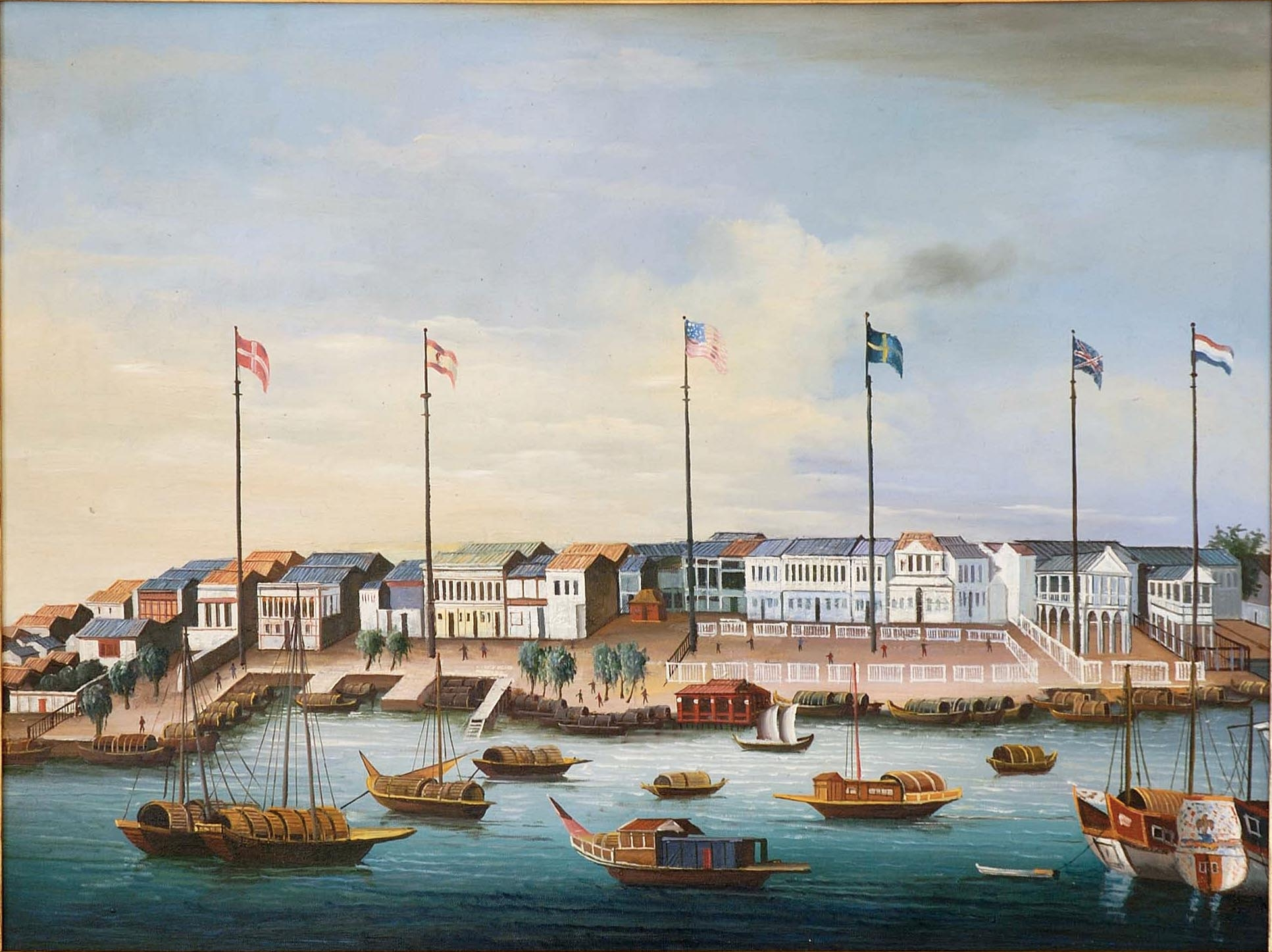
The Thirteen Factories, the area of Guangzhou to which China's Western trade was restricted from 1757 to 1842

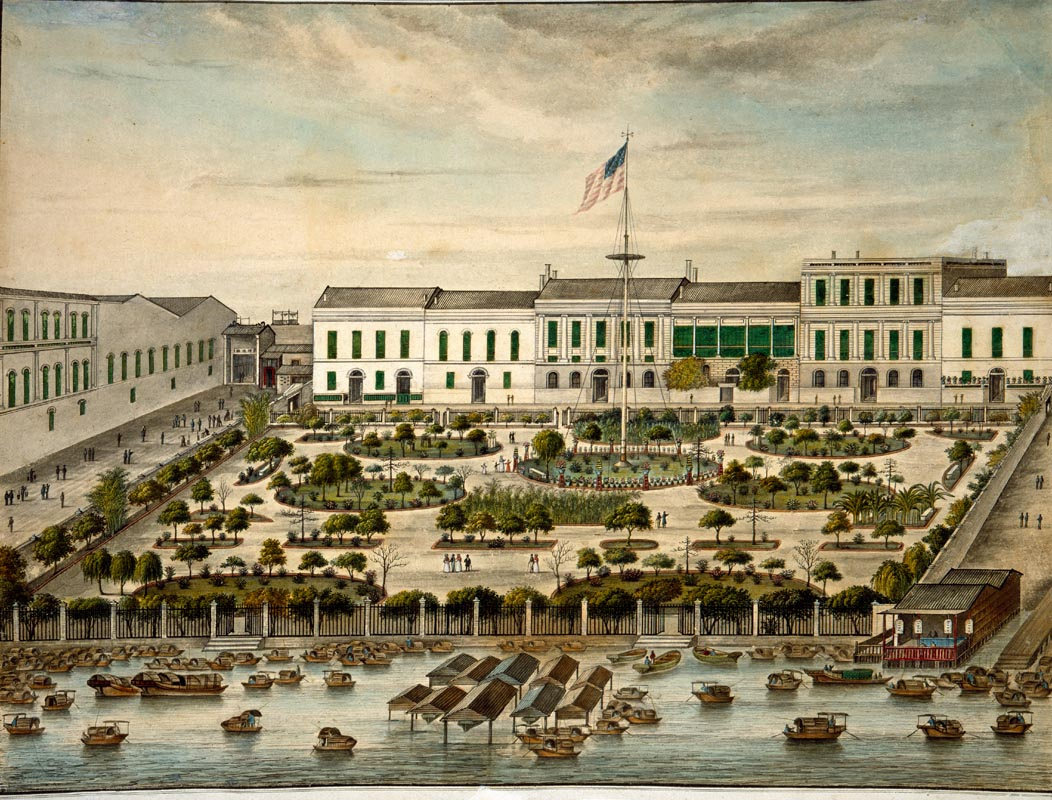
The gardens of the American factory at Guangzhou c. 1845

The Old China Trade (Chinese: 舊中國貿易) was the early commerce between the Qing Empire and the United States under the Canton System, spanning from shortly after the end of the American Revolutionary War in 1783 to the Treaty of Wanghia in 1844. The Old China Trade represented the beginning of relations between the United States and East Asia, including eventually U.S.–China relations. The maritime fur trade was a major aspect of the Old China Trade, as was illegal trafficking in opium. The trade era overlapped the First Opium War, which resulted from an attempt by China to enforce its prohibition on opium smuggling by Western traders and blockade-runners.

== Origins ==
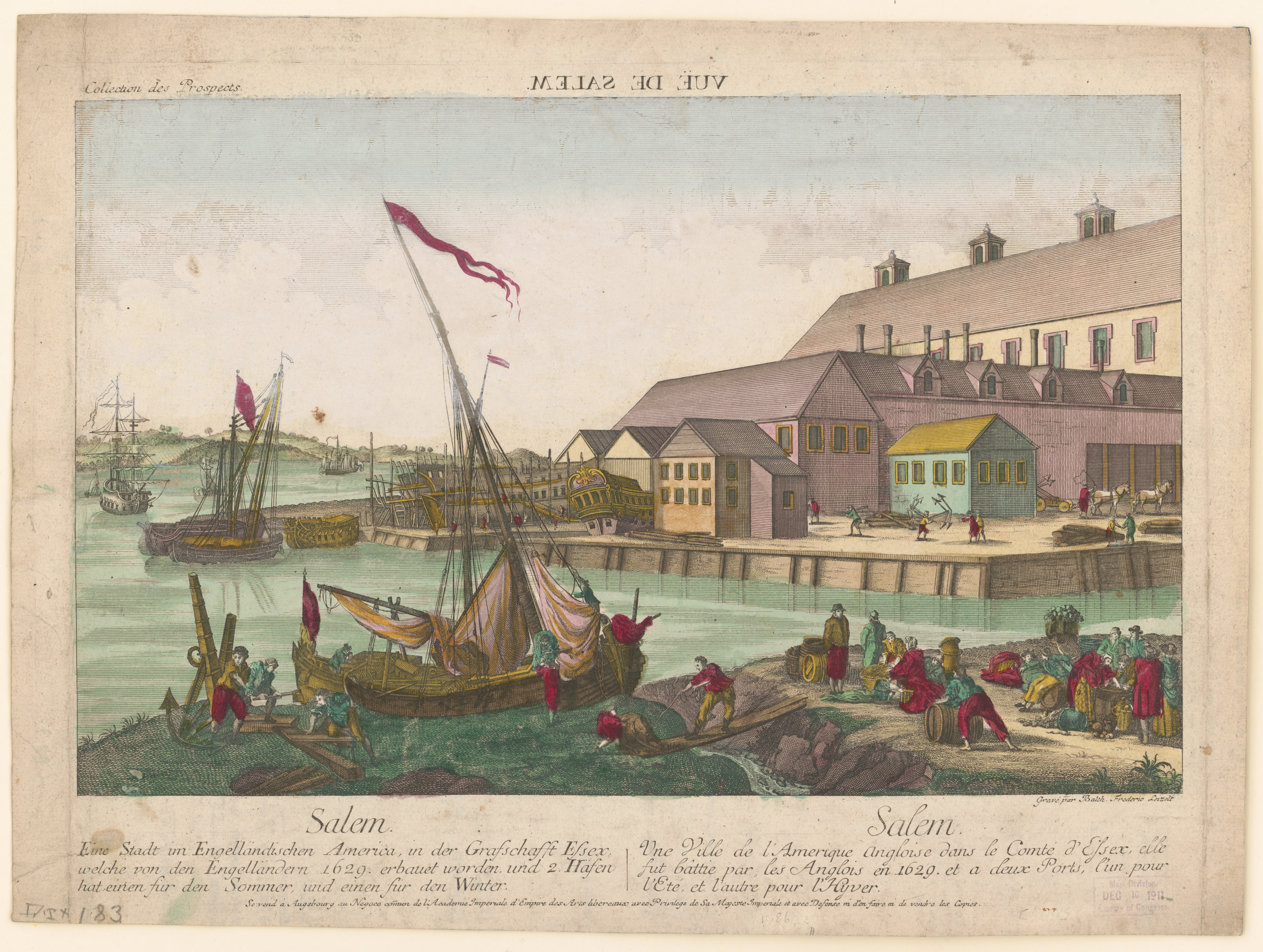
Port of Salem, Massachusetts, 1770s

The American Revolutionary War, which ended with the 1783 Treaty of Paris, led to the Thirteen Colonies becoming independent from Britain as the United States, which continued to consume large quantities of tea. At the time, increased global demand for tea was one of the primary reasons for a shortage of silver; this was the only currency that the Chinese, sole producers of the commodity at the time, would accept in payment. The British East India Company (EIC), monopoly suppliers of tea to the British Empire's markets, got around the problem by indirect sales of opium to the Chinese, the proceeds from which they used to pay for tea.

The Americans meanwhile, also needed silver to finance their burgeoning international trade in furs, timber and other commodities. They too looked to the Chinese market as a source of hard currency based on the US monopoly of the Ottoman opium trade. The United States' first consul in China, Bostonian and former Continental Army officer Samuel Shaw (1754–1794), arrived in the port of Guangzhou (then romanized as "Canton") in 1784 aboard the converted privateer Empress of China. The "Chinese Queen", as the vessel was known, under the command of Captain John Green, carried a cargo of silver specie and ginseng for trade. In Guangzhou, the Americans encountered many European nations already trading under the Canton System, including the British, Dutch, French and Danish.

Shaw subsequently negotiated the sale of the Empress's cargo and earned a substantial profit. As well as symbolizing a breach of the EIC's tea monopoly, the successful and lucrative voyage of the Empress inspired other American merchants to follow suit with the desire to enter a new market with great potential for profit. By 1803, American vessels outnumbered all other Western nations in their trade with China. While more numerous, American vessels were smaller, averaging just under 300 tons each, compared with the East Indiamen from Europe, which averaged 1,200 tons each.

== American business growth with the opium trade ==
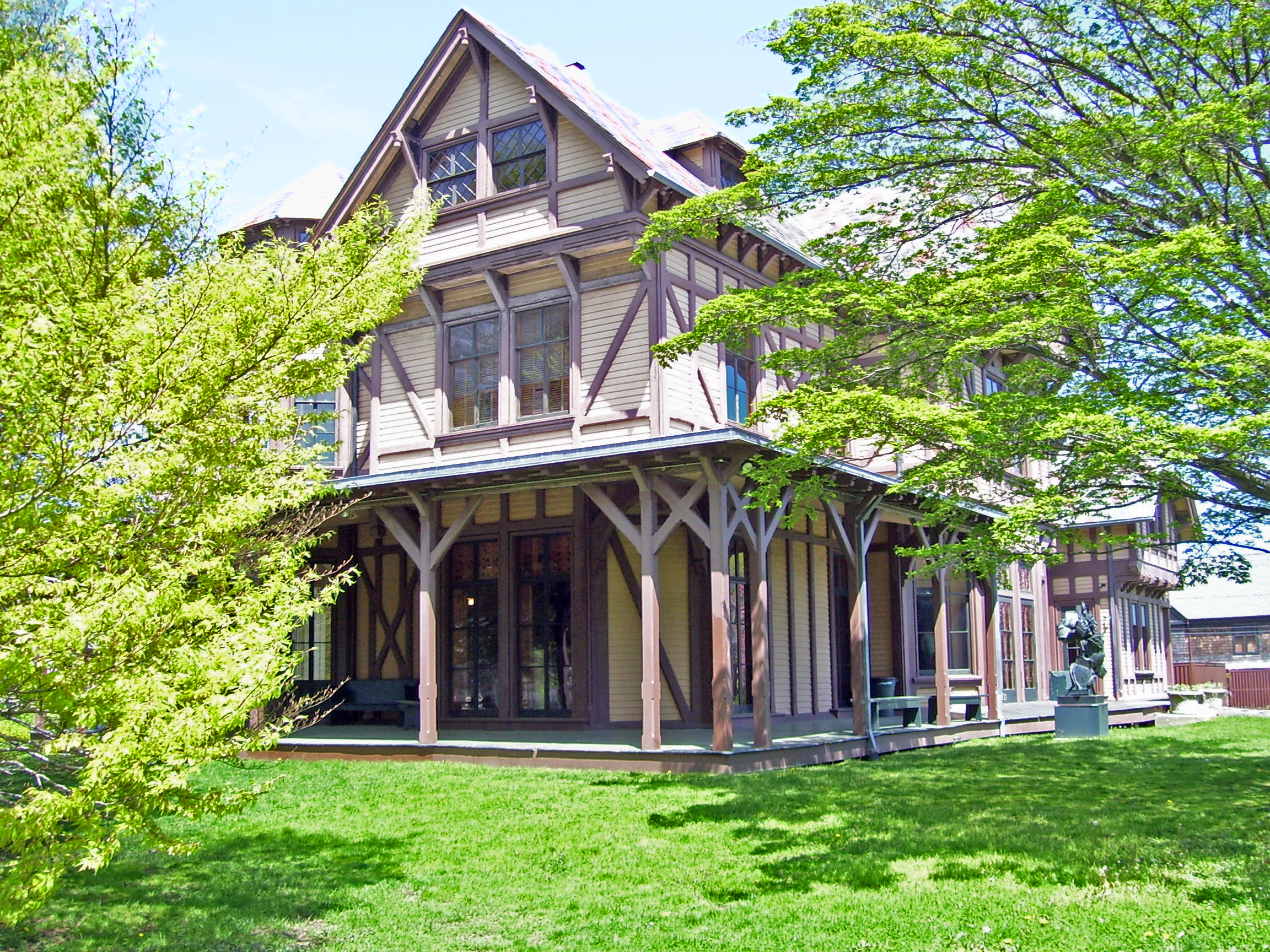
John N. A. Griswold House, built-in 1864 for an American China trade merchant in Newport, Rhode Island

Two years after the voyage of the Empress, Shaw set up the firm of Shaw & Randall to advise American firms unfamiliar with trade in the Far East. Boston Brahmin Thomas Handasyd Perkins of Perkins & Co., the dominant American presence in the Ottoman opium business, along with one of his partners and his 16‑year-old nephew John Perkins Cushing, subsequently opened operations in Guangzhou, where Russell & Co. had become the most important American illegal smuggler and dealer of opium. The founders of Russell & Co., Samuel Russell, and Philip Ammedon, had set up in the Chinese city in 1808, buying opium at auction from the EIC in Bombay, which they then shipped clandestinely to Guangzhou on the south coast of China. By 1827 Russell and Co. had become the largest American opium dealer in China, competing in the market alongside British firms including Jardine, Matheson & Co. and Dent & Co. Of all the American firms, only Olyphant & Co. and one other abstained from the opium trade.

Trade with China, originally an enterprise of seemingly limited prospects involving significant risk instead turned out to be extremely lucrative. American traders, then with a stable foothold in Guangzhou, were eager to sell their goods to China, but the Chinese interest in foreign goods was limited. The first item that tended to sell in China was Spanish bullion: American traders would devote large sums of money to buying and amassing large quantities of the metal for export to China. The Spanish silver bullion was primarily used to complement the less profitable American goods such as cheese, grain, and rum. The use of bullion eventually became considerable with over $62 million worth of specie traded to China between 1805 and 1825. This practice, however, gradually declined after 1815, when American merchants began to participate in "chain trade" routes —the buying and selling of goods en route to Guangzhou. The second major —and by far the most lucrative— American export to China was ginseng. Hailed by the Chinese, among other cultures as shown by the genus' Latinate scientific name Panax as a panacea, the most potent and therefore most demanded type of ginseng, Panax quinquefolius, grew in Manchuria and the Appalachian Mountains. Transported from the interiors of Pennsylvania and Virginia to Philadelphia, New York, or Boston, ginseng was then shipped to China and sold for up to 250 times its weight in silver. Furs were the third-most lucrative American export to China. Searching for another type of item that could be sold to the Chinese aside from specie and ginseng, Americans soon found that the mandarins had a taste for sea otter pelts, which could be inexpensively purchased from the Indians of the northwest coast of the United States and shipped to Guangzhou. The Chinese mandarins' desire for bullion, ginseng, and furs was the primary impetus for the United States' initiation of trade with China. The return of the Empress of China, which had carried all three commodities, and her by the now rich crew to Boston in 1785 inspired other Americans to make similar voyages. However, different reasons emerged for maintaining trade with China.

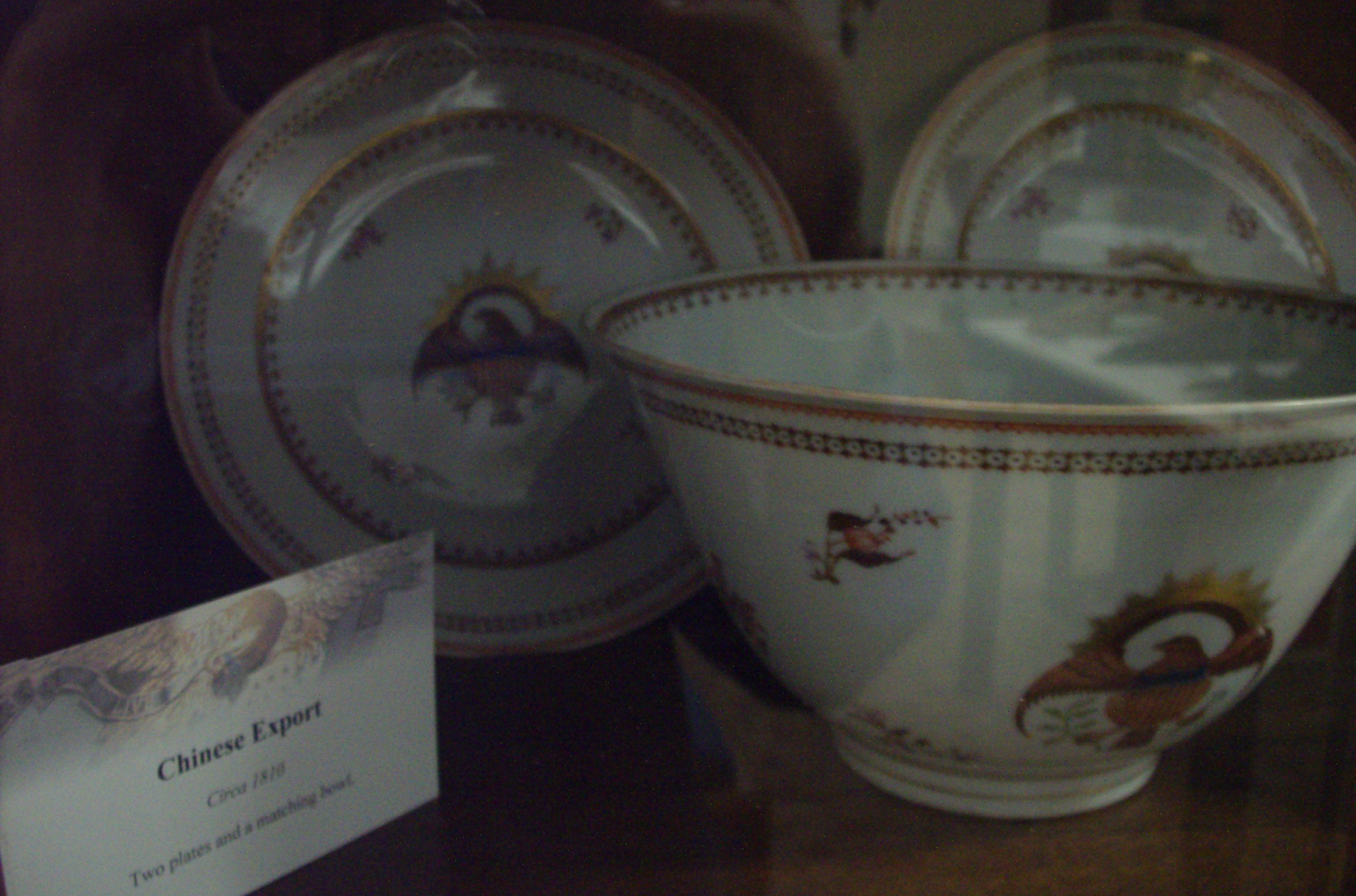
Chinese export porcelain c. 1810

There had always been a general American desire for foreign and sometimes exotic wares, and, with the EIC no longer the dominant force in North American trade with China, the job of satisfying this demand fell to American merchants. Therefore, when the Empress returned home, she brought with her a large stock of outlandish Chinese goods, which her owners sold for a significant profit of $30,000—a 25% gain. Other American merchants did not take long to realize that, while selling American specie, ginseng, and fur to the Chinese was undoubtedly profitable, selling Chinese goods in the United States would be considerably more so. Further motivation came from the knowledge that China, as a whole, had a mercantilist-like attitude towards foreign commerce; they tended to resist the importation of foreign goods because of a mixture of Confucian doctrine, which deprecated trade, and the underlying ethnocentrism felt by the Chinese—they did not need to actively search for trade because the inferior white "barbarian" states would instinctively bring it to them as a form of tribute. Because of these factors, American traders began to focus their funds on acquiring Chinese goods—a practice that the Chinese were more willing to adopt—rather than on purchasing those of the United States. What resulted was the flooding of Chinese teas, cotton, silks, rhubarb, cassia, nankeens (durable, yellow cloth), floor-matting, lacquerware, fans, furniture, and porcelains, into the US, to the extent that even those of poor social classes possessed some Chinese items—perhaps a painting of Guangzhou's harbor or a pair of trousers made out of nankeen cloth.

== The development of the Canton System ==
=== The Cohong monopoly and supercargoes ===
In 1757, the Qianlong Emperor of the Qing dynasty confined all Western trade to Guangzhou and regulated it through the use of merchants known collectively as the Cohong. This group owned a licensed monopoly on trade with foreigners and served as trading intermediaries accountable for their behavior and cargoes. Relations between the Cohong and the foreign merchants were cordial and very peaceful, as both parties valued their reputations and had vested interests in preventing the disruption of trade. The Cohong reviewed the cargo of each ship and collected tariffs that were then passed onto the Hoppo (Inspector of Customs). The Cohong was at the mercy of the government's demands for revenue, and they had to add costs to the foreign merchants, in order to extract extra money for bribes to please the officials; although Qing court officials did not actively supervise foreign trade, China's government treasury reaped the benefits of tariff revenues. Additionally, each foreign vessel had to contract a comprador responsible for supplying the ship with provisions and servicing the factories onshore.

Before the rise of four American trading houses in the 1820s that controlled seven-eighths of the China trade by 1825—Perkins and Company, Jones Oakford and Company, Archer, and T. H. Smith—the American trade was conducted through the use of supercargoes. Each American ship had a supercargo who acted as the commercial agent responsible for the purchases of Chinese goods. He had to arrive and leave on his vessel. It was not until 1800 that supercargoes began to establish themselves as resident agents in Guangzhou. These agents either served trading houses or operated off of commissions from other private merchants' transactions. Upon their emergence, large trading houses, greater capitalization, and higher volumes of trade became possible.

=== Finding media of exchange ===
One of the largest problems faced by foreign traders in Guangzhou was finding a reliable medium of exchange that would enable sustainable trade with the Chinese. The Chinese were always willing to accept bullion, in exchange for tea and other products. This was because the Chinese were fairly self-sufficient and did not have a large desire for foreign goods. Specie was very expensive and difficult to acquire considering that the supply coming from South America fluctuated and it required a lot of goods to attain through a trade. Unable to afford to sustain high-level trading in specie, British merchants turned to the lucrative opium trade, obtaining trading rights for opium from India and importing it to China. Beginning in 1767 and rapidly expanding through the early 1800s, opium was illegally traded for specie with Chinese merchants and then reinvested in tea for importation to British markets.

The Americans had less difficulty finding a variety of different products to barter for tea. The Empress of China and the following early vessels were able to use ginseng and some specie to secure tea. Yet, the market for ginseng was rather small, so the Americans began trading furs with Indian tribes in the American Northwest, which was in turn traded for specie in Guangzhou, which was then used to purchase tea. From 1790 to 1812 supplies of furs and then sealskins were depleted and new products had to be found as demand also waned. In the Pacific Islands, merchants evaded cannibals and traded with natives to get sandalwood and sea slugs that could be traded for specie. But those items soon ran their course, and by 1814 specie had risen to nearly 70% of total American exports. In the 1820s, they attempted to compete with the British opium trade that monopolized crops produced in India by trading for Ottoman opium. Massachusetts General Hospital, McLean Hospital and the Boston Athenæum, the Bunker Hill Monument, many factories, mines, the US's first railroad, university buildings, high schools, public libraries, and an orphanage were built with the proceeds of opium smuggling. The opium trade was profitable for American traders and some of these profits were reinvested to support the industrial revolution. However, the opium trade had a damaging effect on Chinese society.

The innovation of the British credit system and issuance of banking bills allowed the American traders to clear their debts with Cohong merchants and gradually substitute their cargoes away from carrying specie and more towards domestically manufactured items. The Americans could then later pay off the principal and interest on their loans to the British banks. From 1830 to 1850, faster and larger tea clippers were introduced, thereby replacing the earlier, smaller privateering vessels from the American Revolution. As a result, Americans could achieve greater scale with the combination of tea clippers and British credit. Tea could be transported to American markets in less time and with greater freshness, translating into higher profits. By 1834, tea accounted for over 80% of the American trade from China.

== American diplomacy in China ==
The American trade in Guangzhou existed primarily through private traders and without the supervision and supporting authority of the United States government. Soon after 1784, an American consul was appointed in Guangzhou and functioned as a reporting agent on trade to the U.S. government. The consul was not recognized by the Chinese authorities or the hoppo, and was not allowed to fly the American flag over its factory until well after 1799. The Americans had to trade with the Chinese as subordinates instead of equals and use the Cohong for any and all demands. Consequently, the Americans did not have the leverage to raise political or legal protests and had to submit themselves to the Chinese justice system that believed in a "life for a life" and holding groups accountable for the actions of individuals. The chief concern of foreign traders was preventing the Chinese from closing trade, as they could threaten to do over legal disputes.

== Denouement ==
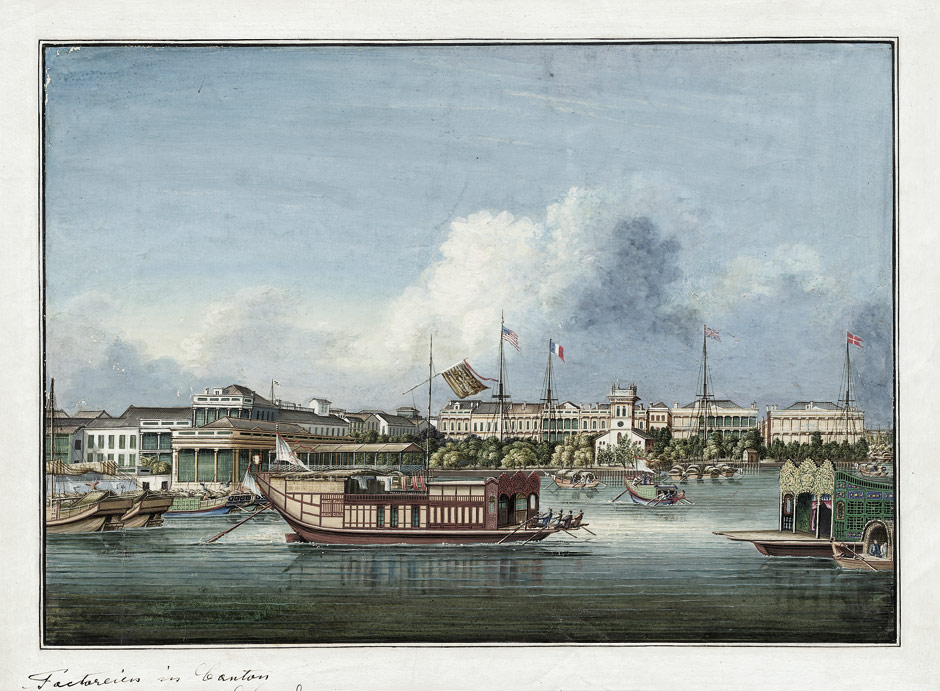
Guangzhou's harbor in 1850

At the end of the First Opium War in 1842, Britain and China signed the Treaty of Nanking, which effectively overthrew the original mercantilist system and opened the ports of Guangzhou, Xiamen ("Amoy"), Fuzhou ("Foochow"), Ningbo ("Ningpo"), and Shanghai to British merchants. Seeing that Britain could easily eliminate foreign competition in China with its new privileges and considerable trading prowess, the Americans found the need to reestablish their diplomatic relations and commercial equality in China. For the previous fifty-nine years, the Americans had been interacting with China merely through their business transactions, without government-to-government communication. As a result, the administration of President John Tyler sent the commissioner Caleb Cushing to negotiate a treaty in which the United States would receive the same privileges as Britain. Cushing, in the Treaty of Wanghsia in 1844, not only achieved this goal but also won the right of extraterritoriality, which meant that Americans accused of crimes in China were to be tried by American courts only. This treaty was monumental in that it laid the foundation for a more extensive and regulated American trade with China; American ships would no longer make the sporadic—and somewhat reckless—voyages to China so characteristic of the Old China trade.

== Category of the trade ==
=== Fine art ===
==== Porcelain ====
In the late 18th century, Chinese porcelain could be purchased from two sources: the licensed Hong merchants or the porcelain specialized shopkeepers.

===== Porcelain specialized shopkeepers =====
From the records, the original porcelain market was concentrated on a street several blocks north of the thirteen factory area. Until 1760, after the Cohong was created, all the small shopkeepers were moved to a new street on the quay which was later referred to as "China Street" (called Jingyuan Jie 静远街/靖远街 in Chinese). There were about 180 different names of porcelain shops from foreign trade records between 1700 and 1800. However, since many of them appear in records only once or for a few years, there were only a total of 25 to 30 shops dealing with the porcelain business. Most of the porcelain dealers in Guangzhou were small, family-run operations with sales of less than 1,000 taels of merchandise a year, while a few of them could manage to reach an annual gross sale of 10,000 taels per year. Each year, porcelain dealers generally placed their order to manufacturers at Jingdezhen from October to December. The items were completed and shipped to Guangzhou in August or September for export. From the early 1780s to the 1810s, the export market started to shrink. Records show that in 1764, there were 20,116 piculs exported, while in 1784, the porcelain export declined to 13,780 piculs. Although it reached 25,890 piculs in 1798, soon the porcelain exports shrank to only 6,175 piculs in 1801. Finally, the amount of porcelain exported remains at an average level of 6,000 piculs per year around the 1820s. The reason for the drastic change in amounts of porcelain exported could result from the increase in the porcelain price due to the increasing labor cost and Chinese duties on exporting porcelain.

== Legacy of the Old China Trade in Salem, Massachusetts ==
In Salem, Massachusetts there are important examples of American colonial architecture and Federal architecture from the Old China Trade in two historic districts, Chestnut Street District, part of the Samuel McIntire Historic District containing 407 buildings and the Salem Maritime National Historic Site, consisting of 12 historic structures and about 9 acres (3.6 ha) of land along the waterfront in Salem, Massachusetts.

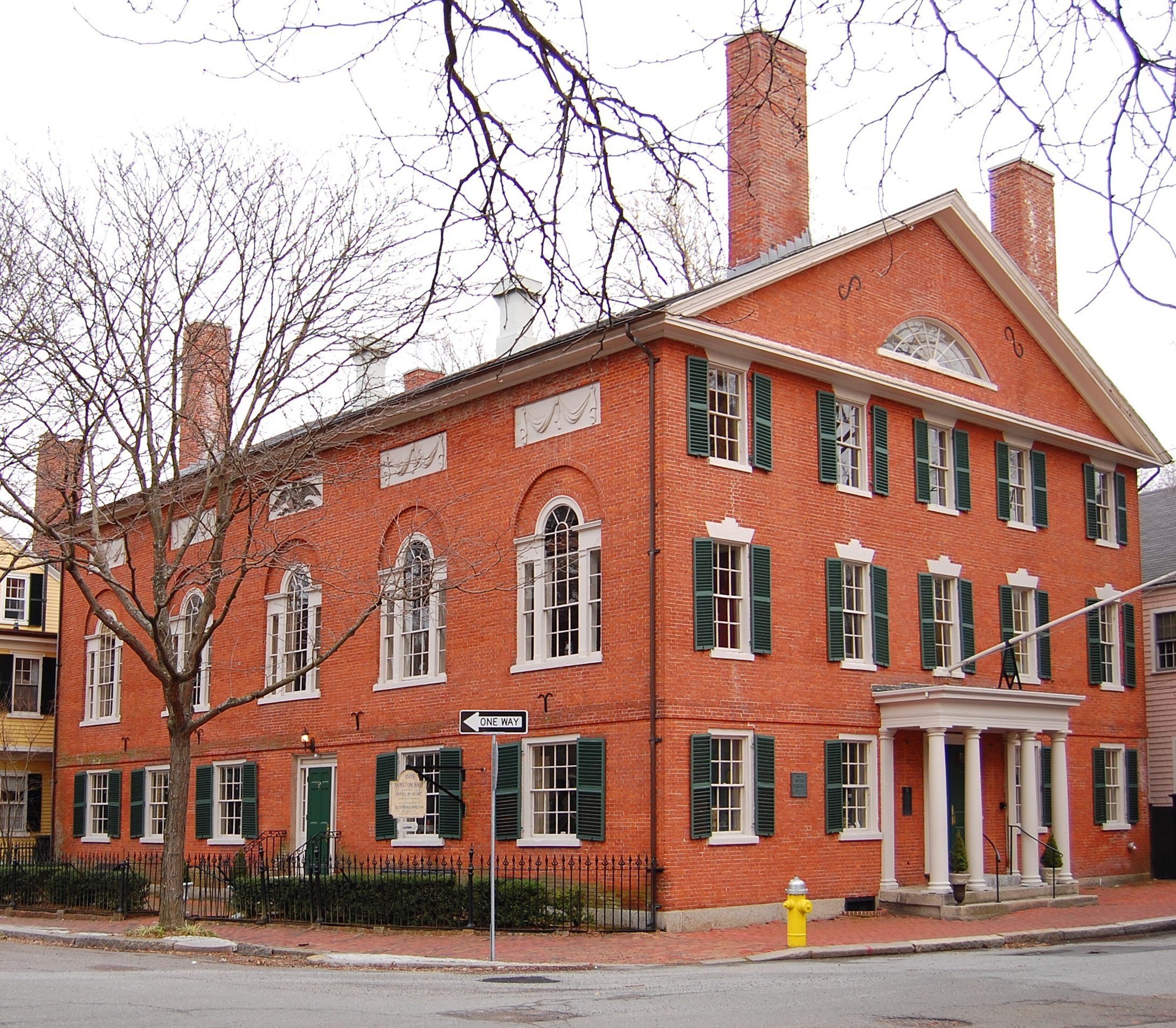
Hamilton Hall

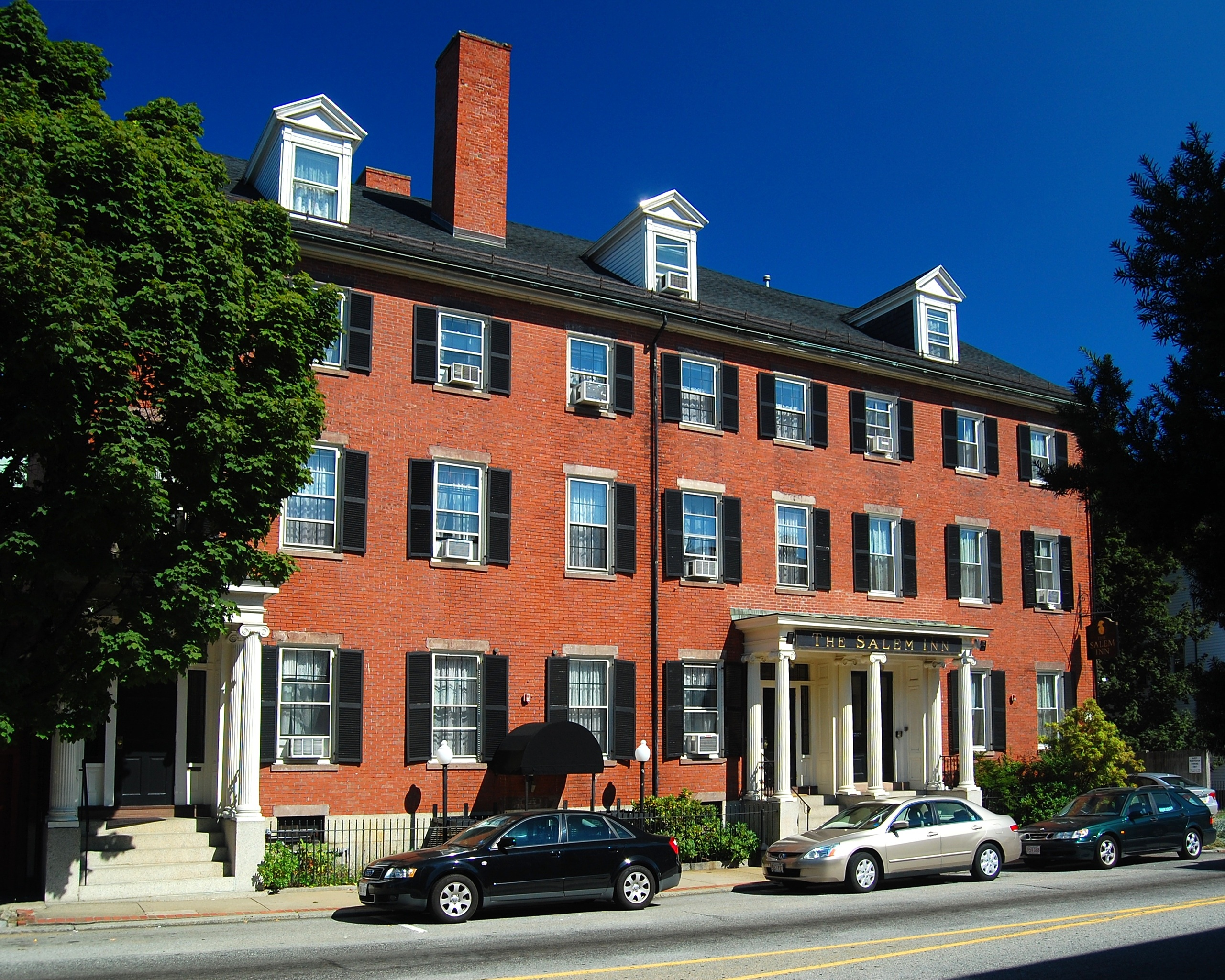
The Salem Inn on Summer Street

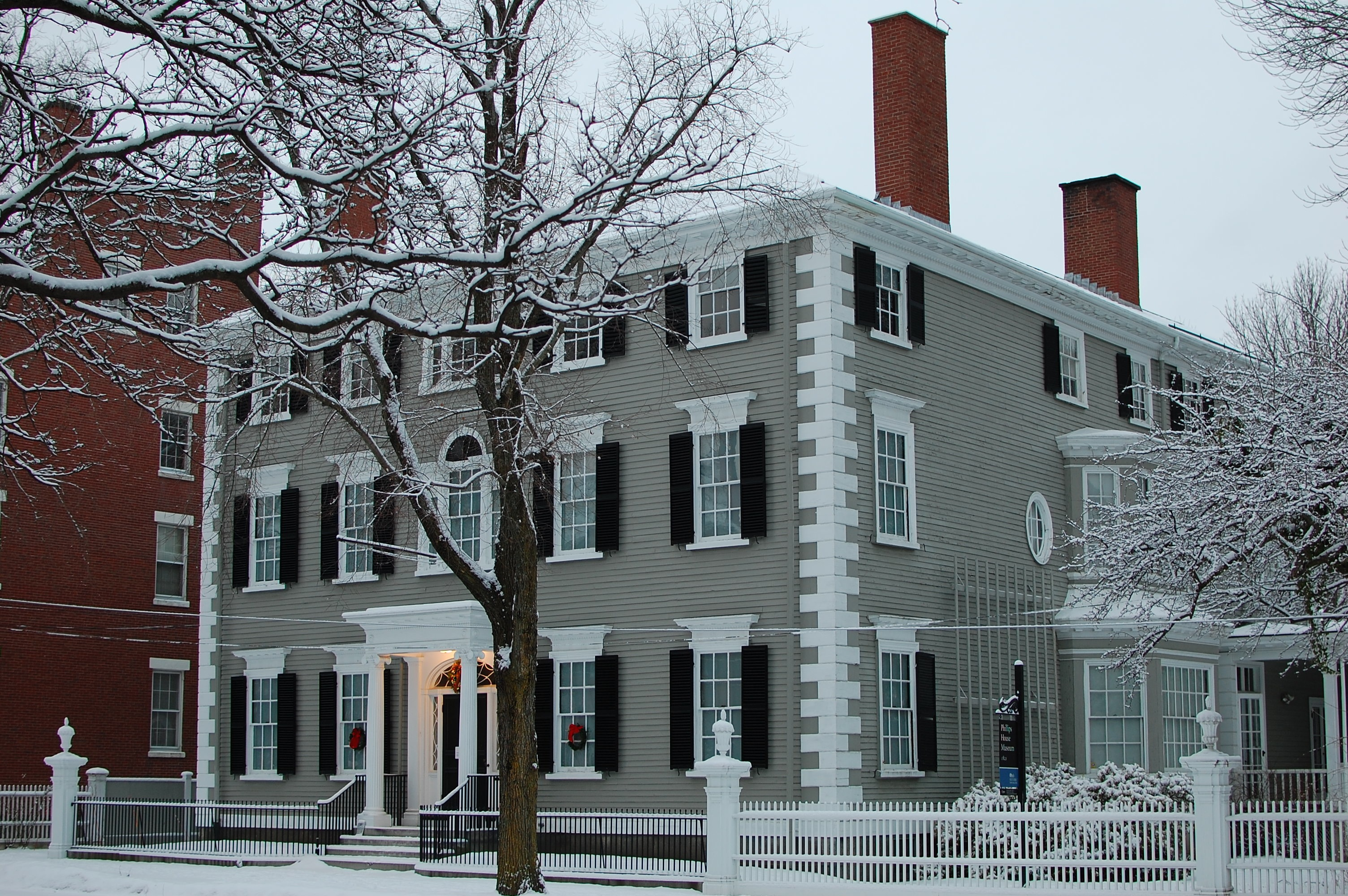
Stephen Phillips House at 34 Chestnut Street

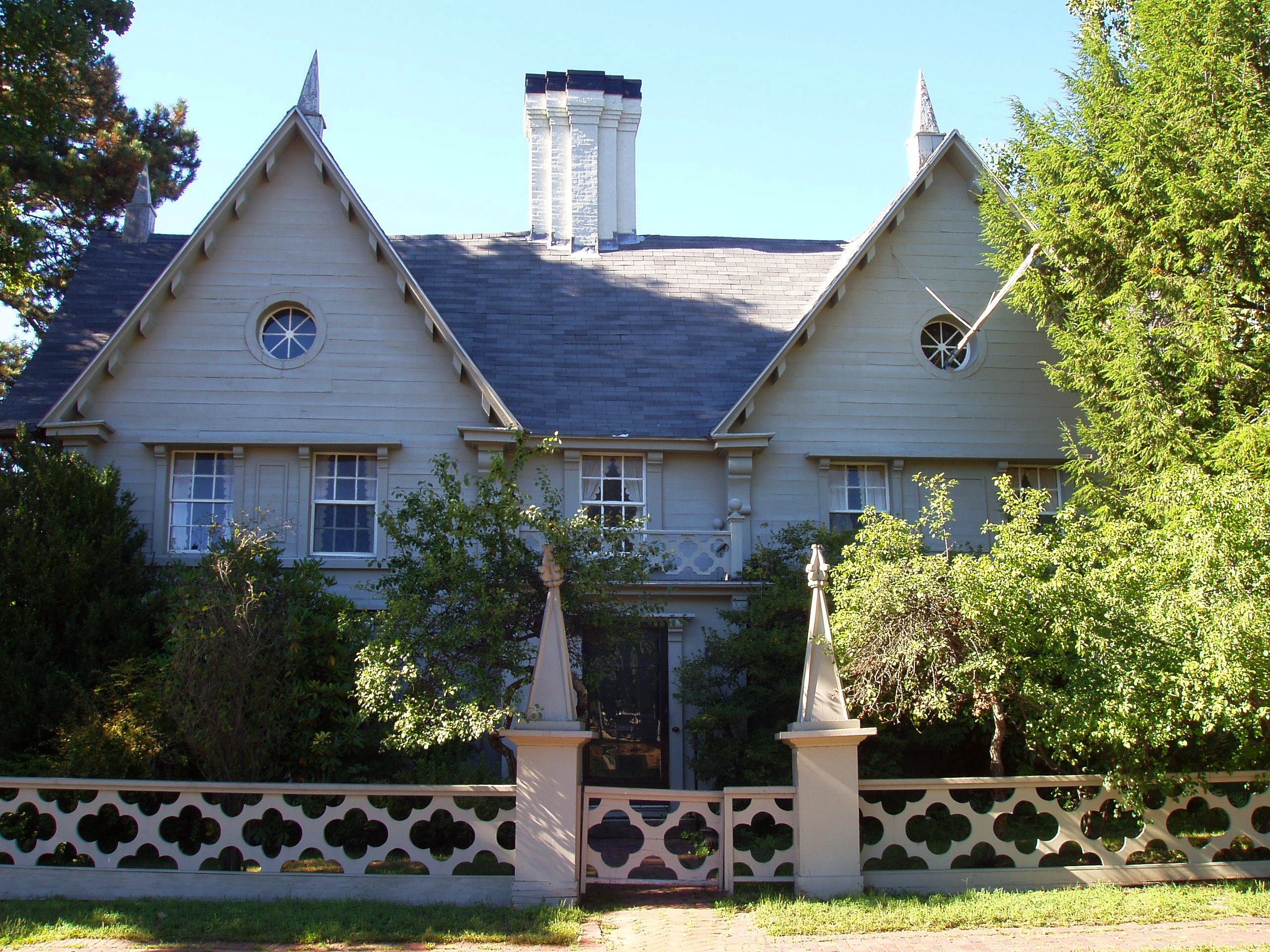
The Pickering House, 18 Broad Street

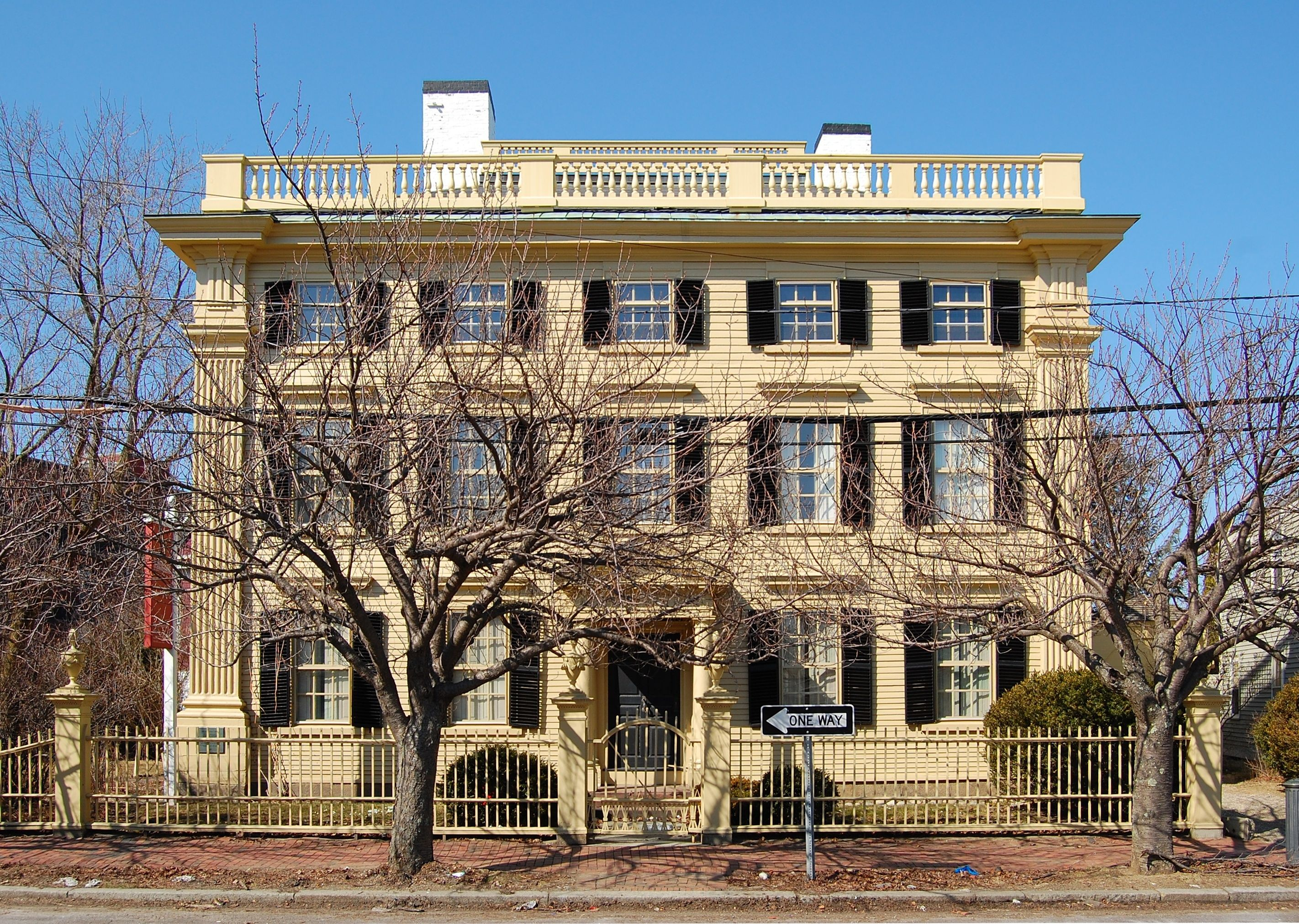
Peirce Nichols House, Federal Street

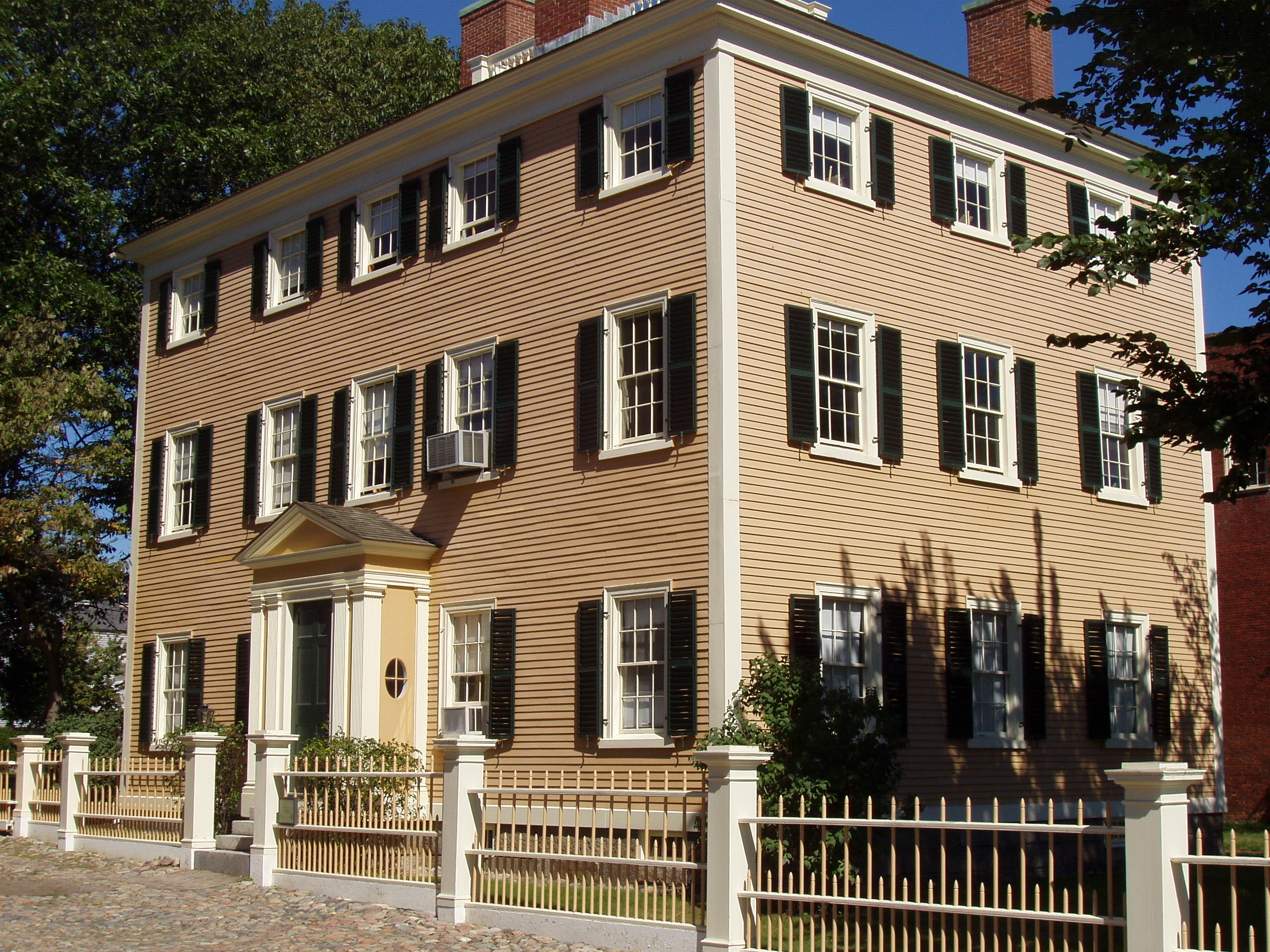
Hawkes House, Derby Wharf

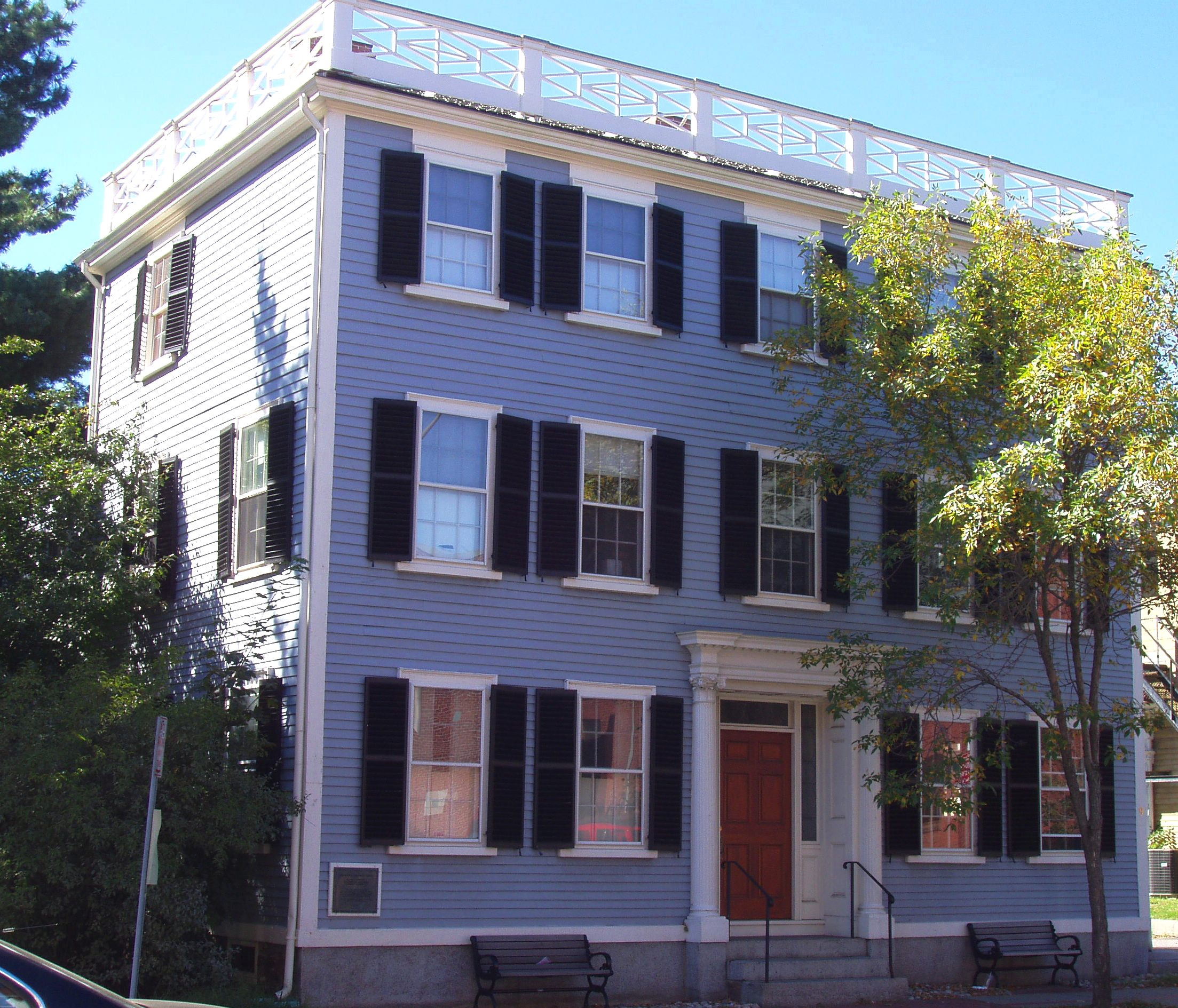
Nathaniel Bowditch House

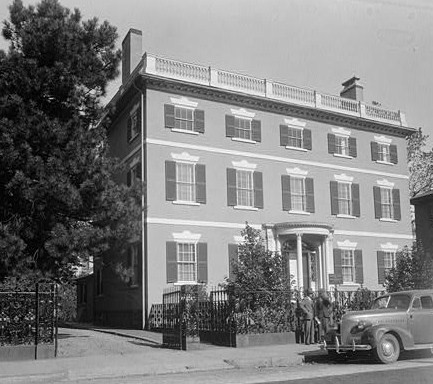
Gardner-Pingree House

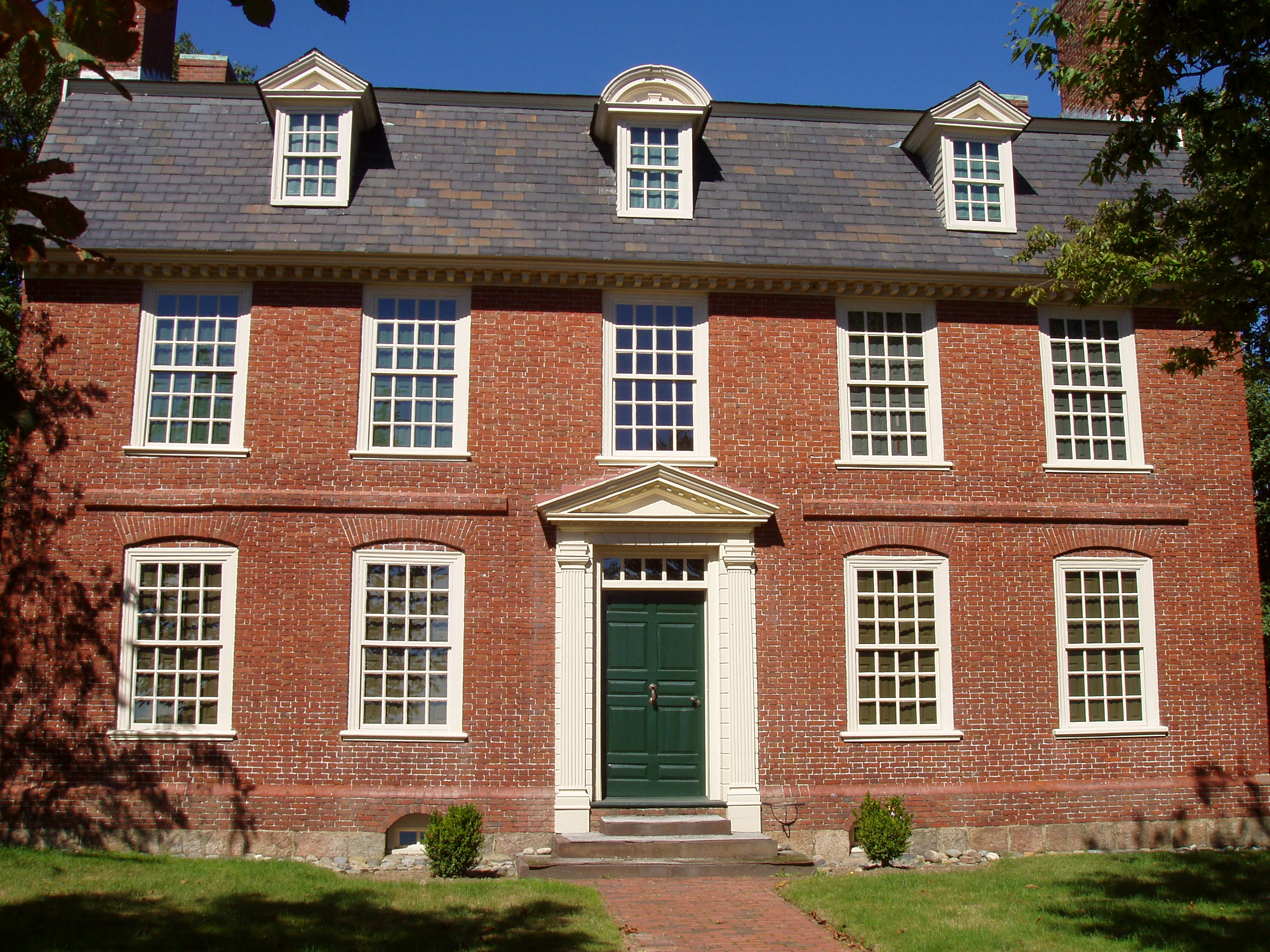
Derby House in Salem Massachusetts. Elias Hasket Derby was among the wealthiest and most celebrated of post-Revolutionary merchants in Salem, Massachusetts, and owner of the Grand Turk, the first New England vessel to trade directly with China.

== Noted China Trade merchants ==
- William Henry Aspinwall
- George Cabot
- John Perkins Cushing
- Elias Hasket Derby
- Fanning & Coles
- John Murray Forbes
- Robert Bennet Forbes
- Charles W. King
- Abiel Abbot Low
- Gideon Nye
- David Olyphant
- Joseph Peabody
- Thomas Handasyd Perkins
- Russell Sturgis
- John Renshaw Thomson
- Israel Thorndike
- William Shepard Wetmore
- John Jacob Astor
- Warren Delano Jr.

== See also ==
- Foreign relations of Imperial China
- History of the west coast of North America
- Paul Jones (1843 ship)
- Turkey merchant
- Jiao (commercial guild)
