= Fat Tau Chau =

Coordinates: 22.31395°N 114.268706°E

Fat Tau Chau Village (Chinese: 佛頭洲村) a.k.a. Fu Tau Chau (斧頭洲) is a village in the Hang Hau area of Sai Kung District, New Territories, Hong Kong.

== Recognised status ==
Fat Tau Chau is a recognised village under the New Territories Small House Policy.

== History ==
The current Fat Tau Chau Village is a resite village that was relocated together with the nearby Tin Ha Wan Village in the early 1990s. The historical location was on Fat Tong Chau.
