= Tin Ha Wan Village =

Village in Hang Hau, Sai Kung, Hong Kong

Coordinates: 22.315383°N 114.269891°E

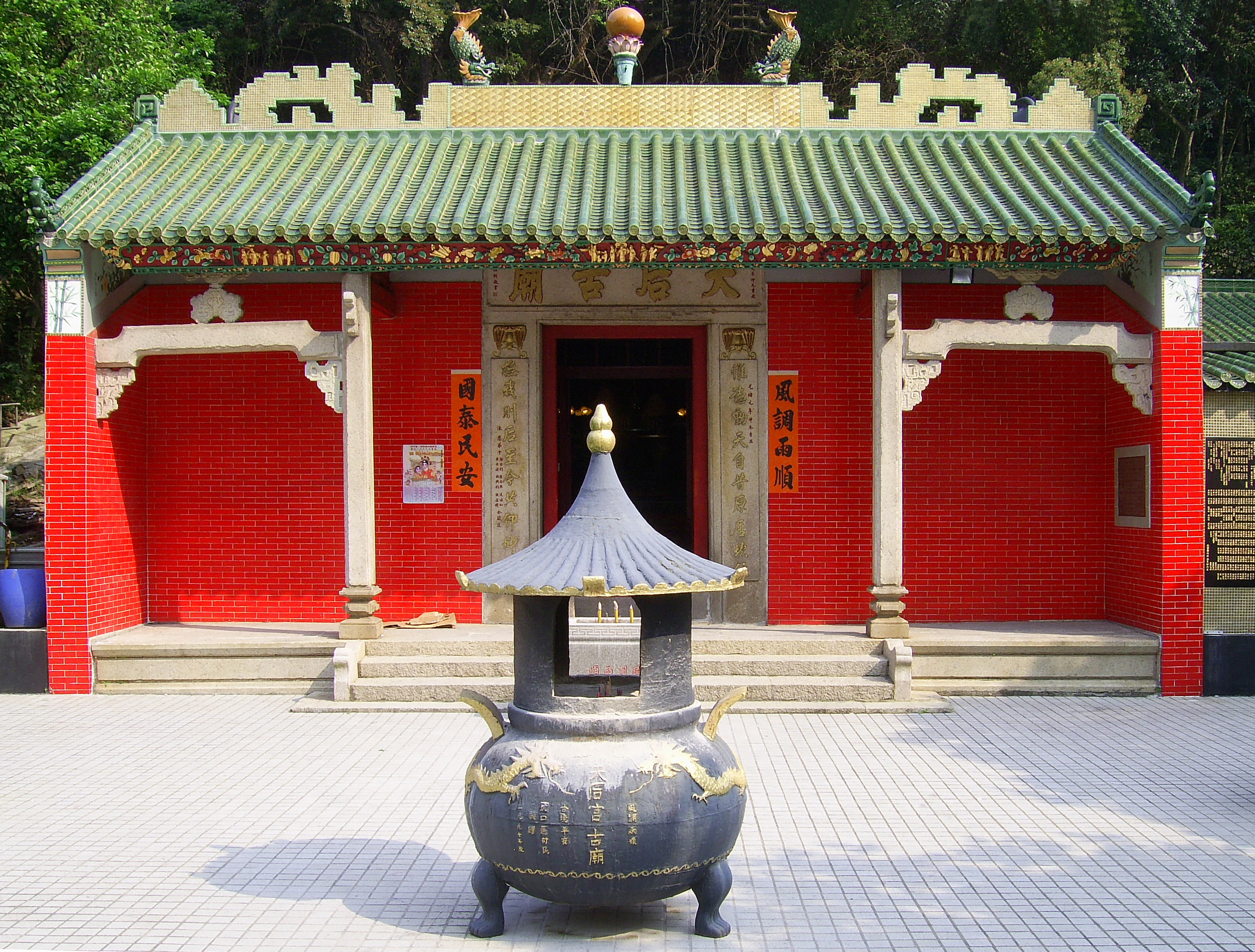
Tin Hau Temple located between Tin Ha Wan Village and Fat Tau Chau Village.

Tin Ha Wan Village (Chinese: 田下灣村) is a village in the Hang Hau area of Sai Kung District, New Territories, Hong Kong.

== Administration ==
Tin Ha Wan Village is a recognized village under the New Territories Small House Policy.

== History ==
The current Tin Ha Wan Village is a resite village that was relocated together with the nearby Fat Tau Chau Village in the early 1990s. The historical location of Tin Ha Wan was in a bay near Fat Tong Chau. It comprised two settlements, Sheung Lau Wan and Ha Lau Wan, and had a population of 96 in 1955.

== See also ==
- Fat Tau Chau, a nearby resite village
