= Pan Long Wan =

Coordinates: 22.314187°N 114.28394°E

Pan Long Wan (Chinese: 檳榔灣) is a village of the Clear Water Bay Peninsula, in Sai Kung District, New Territories, Hong Kong.

== Administration ==
Pan Long Wan is a recognized village under the New Territories Small House Policy.

== See also ==
- Fat Tong Chau
