= Olyphant & Co. =

American merchant trading house or hong in 19th-century China

Olyphant & Co. (Chinese: 同孚洋行; pinyin: Tóngfú Yángháng; Jyutping: Tung4fu1 Joeng4hong2) was an American merchant trading house or hong in 19th-century China. From its initial involvement in the "Old China Trade", the firm expanded into other countries including Great Britain, Australia and New Zealand. Olyphant & Co's business dealings in Peru caused the company to collapse in 1878.

== History ==
The firm was founded in Guangzhou (Canton) by David Olyphant and Charles N. Talbot, after their former employer, King & Talbot went bankrupt. In Guangzhou, the two partners established themselves as supercargoes trading in "silk, mattings and fancy articles", operating from the No. 1 building of the American factory. Olyphant was a vociferous opponent of the opium trade, and the firm was one of the only large foreign trading firms not to engage in opium smuggling. The firm's anti-opium stance led to its offices becoming known as "Zion's Corner". Over the next 30 years, the company continued to grow in competition with other traders including Augustine Heard and Company, Russell & Company and Wetmore & Co., opening offices in Hong Kong, Shanghai and Fuzhou and overseas in Australia and New Zealand.

=== Morrison Incident ===
In 1837, Olyphant & Co's ship Morrison made an attempt to repatriate seven shipwrecked Japanese sailors and at the same time open trade with Japan. The crew's efforts were thwarted after the Japanese opened fire and the ship was forced to retreat.

=== Railways ===
After David Olyphant's son Robert Morrison Olyphant reorganized the firm in 1858, in the 1870s, partner Augustus Allen Hayes Jr. helped revive proposals for the Woosung Road Railway between Woosung (now known as Wusong) and Shanghai's Zhabei District in conjunction with Jardine Matheson and Augustine Heard and Company.

=== Clipper ships ===
Olyphant and Co. owned and operated the following clippers for the transport of tea and silk from China to the US:

- William E. Roman (1850)
- Wild Pigeon (1851)
- Tinqua (1851)
- Wild Duck (1852)

== Collapse ==
In the mid 1870s, the firm reduced their interest in Chinese products and instead turned to the sodium nitrate business in conjunction with the government of Peru. As an extension to these dealings with Peru's rulers, Olyphant & Co. agreed to import coolie laborers by steamer from China. However, the firm proved unable to procure the requisite human cargoes, allegedly as a result of jealously on the part of their competition with support from the British government. To the surprise of the mercantile community, the subsequent losses incurred caused Olyphant & Co. to cease trading in late 1878 while owing money to creditors including Drexel, Morgan & Co. and the government of Peru.

== See also ==
- Canton System
- List of trading companies
