= Robert Morrison Olyphant =

American businessman

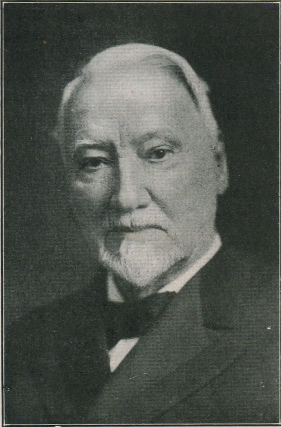
- Born: September 9, 1824; New York City, U.S.
- Died: May 3, 1918 (aged 93); New York City, U.S.
- Education: Columbia College (1842)
- Occupation: Businessman
- Spouse: Anna Vernon
- Parent(s): David Olyphant; Ann Archer McKenzie

Robert Morrison Olyphant (September 9, 1824 – May 3, 1918) was an American businessman active in New York City and China in the late 19th century. He served as president of the Delaware and Hudson Railroad for 20 years.

== Life and career ==
Olyphant was born on September 9, 1824, in Manhattan, New York City, to David Olyphant and Ann Archer (McKenzie) Olyphant. After graduating from Columbia College in 1842, he entered his father's firm, Olyphant & Co., in 1842. Olyphant was named for the Scottish missionary Robert Morrison, who was a friend of his father from Canton (now Guangzhou), China.

Olyphant was in China between 1844–1845 and later, from 1858, reorganized Olyphant and Co. in Canton. He retired from the China trade in 1873. On his return from China, he was appointed to the board of managers of the Delaware and Hudson Canal Company (later the Delaware and Hudson Railroad) and subsequently served as the company's assistant president and vice president followed by a twenty-year stint as president.

He died on May 3, 1918, at his home at 160 West Fifty-ninth Street in Manhattan, New York City.

Olyphant is the great-great-grandfather of actor Timothy Olyphant.

== Sources ==
- Shavit, David (1990). The United States in Asia: A Historical Dictionary. Greenwood Publishing Group. ISBN 978-0-313-26788-8.
