= History of opium in China =

The history of opium in China began with the use of opium for medicinal purposes during the Tang dynasty in the 7th century. In the 17th century the practice of mixing opium with tobacco for smoking spread from Southeast Asia, creating a far greater demand.

Imports of opium into China were 200 chests annually in 1729, when the first anti-opium edict was promulgated. By the time Chinese authorities reissued the prohibition in starker terms in 1799, the figure had leaped; 4,500 chests were imported in 1800. There was a rapid rise in opium trade in the 1830s, and by 1838, just before the First Opium War, imports had climbed to 40,000 chests. The rise continued on after the Treaty of Nanking (1842) that concluded the war. By 1858 annual imports had risen to 70,000 chests (4,480 long tons (4,550 t)), approximately equivalent to one year's worth of the total global production of opium between 1995 and 2005. Among the unequal treaties with the foreign powers, treaties at Tianjin (1858) and Beijing (1860) required China to legalize opium.

By the late 19th century Chinese domestic opium production challenged and then surpassed imports. The 20th century opened with effective campaigns to suppress domestic farming, and in 1907 the British government signed a treaty to eliminate imports. The fall of the Qing dynasty in 1911, however, led to a resurgence in domestic production. The Nationalist government, provincial governments, the base areas of the Chinese Communist Party (CCP), and the British colonial government of Hong Kong all depended on opium taxes as major sources of revenue, as did the Japanese occupation governments during the Second Sino-Japanese War (1937–1945). After 1949 the newly-formed government of the People's Republic of China successfully suppressed the widespread growth and use of opium.

== Early history ==
Historical accounts suggest that opium first arrived in China during the Tang dynasty (618–907) as part of the merchandise of Arab traders. Song dynasty (960–1279) poet and pharmacologist Su Dongpo recorded the use of opium as a medicinal herb: "Daoists often persuade you to drink the jisu water, but even a child can prepare the yingsu soup."

Initially used by medical practitioners to control bodily fluid and preserve qi or vital force, during the Ming dynasty (1368–1644), the drug also functioned as an aphrodisiac or chunyao (春药) as Xu Boling records in his mid-15th century Yingjing Juan:

It is mainly used to treat masculinity, strengthen sperm, and regain vigour. It enhances the art of alchemists, sex and court ladies. Frequent use helps to cure the chronic diarrhea that causes the loss of energy ... Its price equals that of gold.

Ming rulers obtained opium via the tributary system, when it was known as wuxiang (烏香) or "black spice". The Collected Statutes of the Ming Dynasty record gifts to successive Ming emperors of up to 100 kilograms (220 lb) of wuxiang amongst tribute from the Kingdom of Siam, which also included frankincense, costus root, pepper, ivory, rhino horn and peacock feathers. First listed as a taxable commodity in 1589, opium remained legal until the first half of the 18th century.

== Growth of the opium trade ==
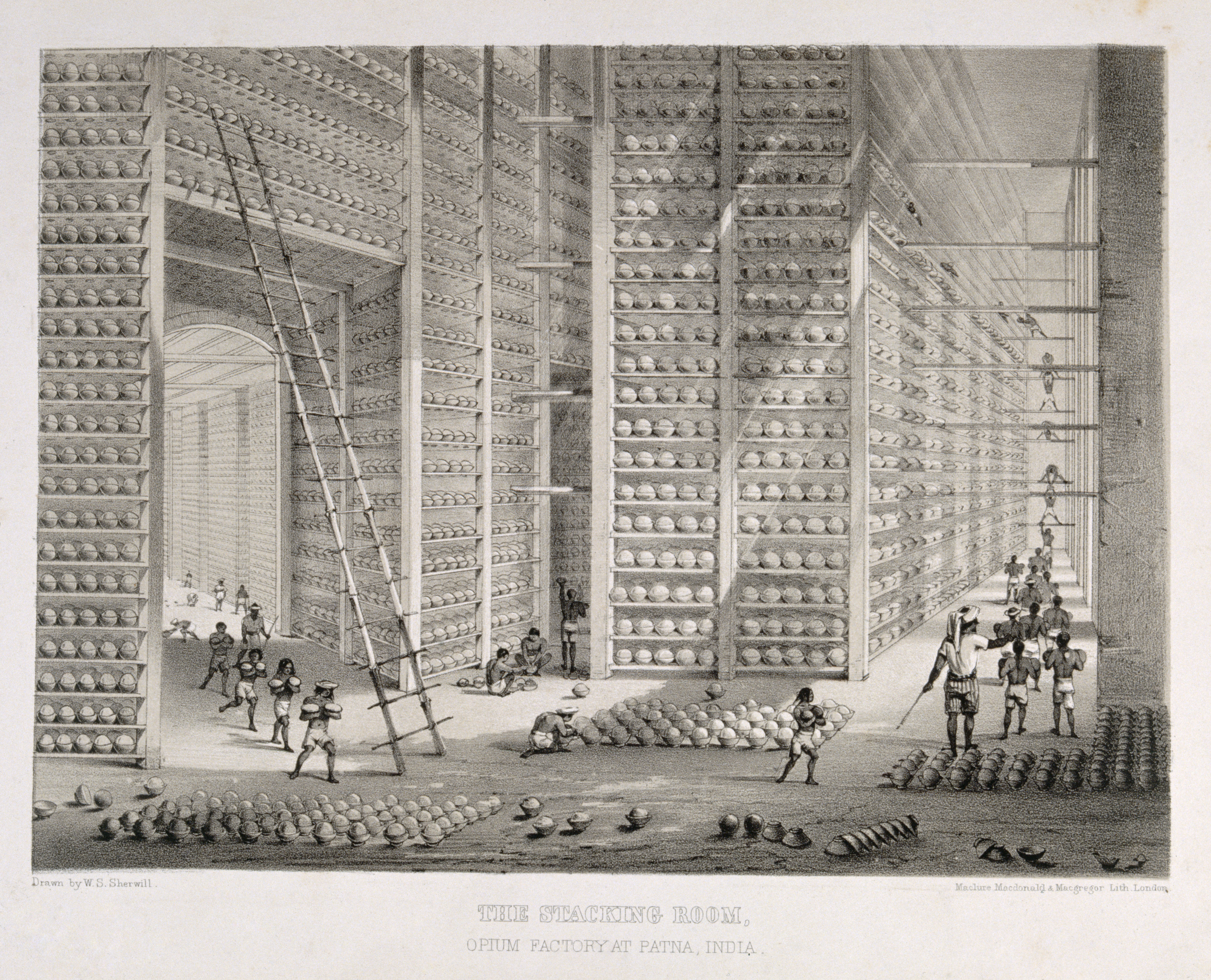
Storage of opium at a British East India Company warehouse in India

In the 16th century the Portuguese became aware of the lucrative medicinal and recreational trade of opium into China and from their factories across Asia chose to supply the Canton System, to satisfy both the medicinal and the recreational use of the drug. By 1729 an edict of the Yongzheng Emperor had criminalized recreational smoking of opium. Traffickers were to be punished in the same way as smugglers, and opium den operators were subject to capital punishment. This is considered to be the start of opium suppression efforts in China. However, the measure proved ineffective, and opium imports increased steadily throughout the 18th century.

Following the 1764 Battle of Buxar, the British East India Company (EIC) became the rulers of Bengal, Bihar and Orissa. The EIC gained control of tax collection, along with the opium monopoly of the defeated Mughal Empire. The East India Company Act, 1793 formally established this monopoly. The EIC was £28 million in debt as a result of the Bengal War and found it difficult to raise silver to pay for Chinese tea that it sold to the British market, which had to be paid for in silver.

As the textile industry developed in Britain during the Industrial Revolution, the EIC drove Indian farmers out of cotton cultivation and shut Indian weaving operations. The EIC encouraged farmers to cultivate opium instead, over time resulting in opium crops far in excess of the demand for medicinal use.

The EIC began auctions of opium in Calcutta to raise revenues. Since importation of opium into China was banned by Chinese law, the EIC established an indirect trading scheme relying partially on legal markets and also leveraging illicit ones. British merchants would buy tea in Canton (Guangzhou) on credit. They would pay their debts by selling opium at auction in Calcutta. This opium was then transported to the Chinese coast aboard British ships, where it was sold to native merchants who would sell it in China. According to 19th century sinologist Edward Parker, there were four types of opium smuggled into China from India: kung pan t'ou (公班土, gongban tu or "Patna"); Pak t'ou (白土, bai tu or "Malwa"); Persian, Kem fa t'ou (金花土, jinhua tu) and the "smaller kong pan", which was of a "dearer sort", i.e. more expensive. A description of the cargo aboard Hercules at Lintin in July 1833 distinguished between "new" and "old" Patna, "new" and "old" Benares, and Malwa; the accounting also specifies the number of chests of each type, and the price per chest. The "chests" contained small balls of opium that had originated in the Indian provinces of Bengal and Madras.

In 1797 the EIC further tightened its grip on the opium trade by enforcing direct trade between opium farmers and the British, and ending the role of Bengali purchasing agents. British exports of opium to China grew from an estimated 15 long tons (15,000 kg) in 1730 to 75 long tons (76,000 kg) in 1773 shipped in over 2,000 chests. The Jiaqing Emperor issued a decree banning imports of the drug in 1799. While China had trade relations with Britain, in order to balance financial books between the two, Britain sold China opium from India which added to availability of opium in China's society. By 1804 the trade deficit had turned into a surplus, leading to seven million silver dollars going to India between 1806 and 1809. Meanwhile, Americans entered the opium trade with less expensive but inferior Turkish opium and by 1810 had around 10% of the trade in Canton. The EIC opium processed in Patna and Benares was supplemented in the 1820s with opium from Malwa in the non-British controlled part of India. Competition drove prices down, but production was stepped up.

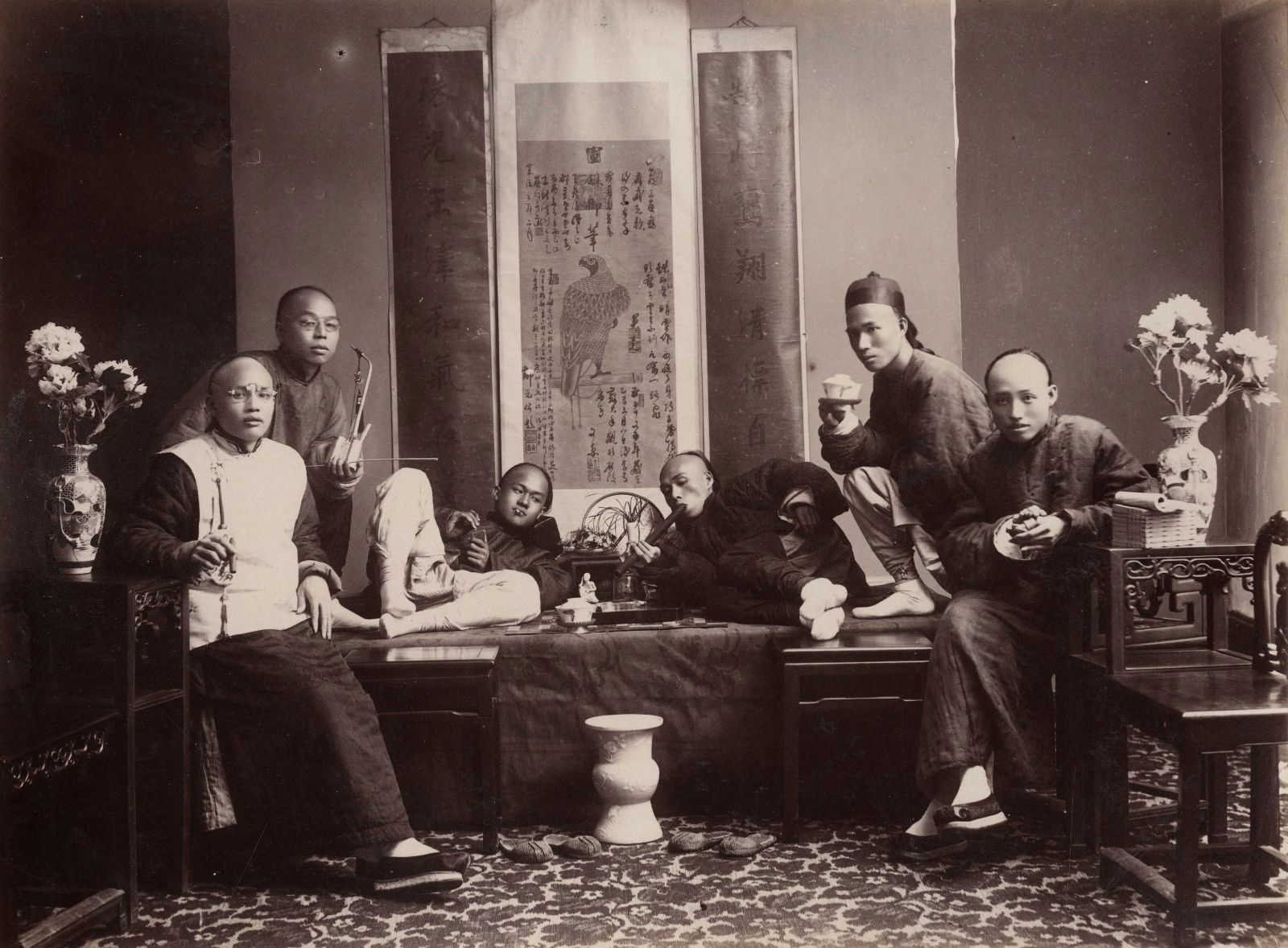
Opium smokers c1880 by Lai Afong.

In the same year the emperor issued a further edict:

Opium has a harm. Opium is a poison, undermining our good customs and morality. Its use is prohibited by law. Now the commoner, Yang, dares to bring it into the Forbidden City. Indeed, he flouts the law! However, recently the purchasers, eaters, and consumers of opium have become numerous. Deceitful merchants buy and sell it to gain profit....If we confine our search for opium to the seaports, we fear the search will not be sufficiently thorough. We should also order the general commandant of the police and police- censors at the five gates to prohibit opium and to search for it at all gates. If they capture any violators, they should immediately punish them and should destroy the opium at once. As to Kwangtung (Guangdong) and Fukien (Fujian), the provinces from which opium comes, we order their viceroys, governors, and superintendents of the maritime customs to conduct a thorough search for opium, and cut off its supply.

The decree had little effect. Opium had become a mainstream recreation among scholars and officials, and by the 1830s the practice had become widespread in cities. The increase in popularity was a result of both social and economic shifts between the Ming and the Qing dynasties in which there was a boost in commercialization, consumerism, and urbanization of opium within the general public. “Opium,” says one recent scholar, became “leisurely, urban, cultured and a status symbol” as an evidence of wealth, leisure, and culture. The Qing government, far away in Beijing, was unable to halt opium smuggling in the southern provinces. A porous Chinese border and rampant local demand facilitated the trade. By 1838 there were millions of Chinese opium users—opium was the main painkiller in a pre-aspirin age. Users were rendered listless and incapable, and the silver being sent abroad put pressure on the Chinese economy. More and more Chinese were smoking British opium as a recreational drug. But for many, what started as recreation soon became a punishing addiction: many people who stopped ingesting opium suffered chills, nausea, and cramps, and sometimes died from drug withdrawal. Once addicted, people would often do almost anything to continue to get access to the drug. Therefore, the Daoguang Emperor demanded action. Officials at the court who advocated legalizing and taxing the trade were defeated by those who advocated suppressing it. The emperor sent the leader of the hard line faction, Special Imperial Commissioner Lin Zexu, to Canton, where he arrested Chinese opium dealers and summarily demanded that foreign firms turn over their stocks with no compensation. When they refused, Lin stopped trade altogether and placed the foreign residents under virtual siege in their factories, eventually forcing the merchants to surrender their opium. Lin destroyed the confiscated opium in 1839, some 1,000 long tons (1,016 t), a process which took 23 days.

== First Opium War ==
China's crackdown on the use of opium clashed with Britain, which advocated for free trade as British merchants were the source of trading opium into China. British traders demanded compensation from their home government for the opium destroyed by Commissioner Lin. This put pressure on India from China as the overwhelming demand for opium was straining as the fixed supply simply no longer reached demands. However, British authorities believed that the Chinese were responsible for payment and sent expeditionary forces from India, which defeated the Qing army and navy in a series of battles and brought China to the negotiating table. The 1842 Treaty of Nanking not only opened the way for further opium trade, but ceded the territory of Hong Kong, unilaterally fixed Chinese tariffs at a low rate, gave Britain most favored nation status and permitted them diplomatic representation. Three million dollars in compensation for debts that the Hong merchants in Canton owed British merchants for the destroyed opium was also to be paid under Article V.

Anglophone capitalists linked their opium trade to the trade in coolie labor, describing them together as "poison and pigs."

== Second Opium War ==
Despite the new ports available for trade under the Treaty of Nanking, by 1854 Britain's imports from China had reached nine times their exports to the country. At the same time British imperial finances came under further pressure from the expense of administering the burgeoning colonies of Hong Kong and Singapore in addition to India. Only India's opium could balance the deficit. Along with various complaints about the treatment of British merchants in Chinese ports and the Qing government's refusal to accept further foreign ambassadors, the relatively minor "Arrow Incident" provided the pretext the British needed to expand their opium trade in China.

The Arrow was a merchant lorcha with an expired British registration that the Qing authorities seized for alleged salt smuggling. British authorities complained to the Governor-general of Liangguang, Ye Mingchen, that the seizure breached Article IX of the 1843 Treaty of the Bogue with regard to extraterritoriality. Matters quickly escalated and led to the Second Opium War, sometimes referred to as the "Arrow War", which broke out in 1856. A number of clashes followed until the war ended with the signature of the Treaty of Tientsin in 1860. Although the treaty did not expressly legalize opium, it opened five additional ports to trade and for the first time allowed foreign traders access to the vast hinterland of China beyond the coast.

== Aftermath of the Opium Wars ==
The treaties with the British led to similar arrangements with the United States and France. These later became known as the Unequal Treaties, while the Opium Wars, according to Chinese historians, represented the start of China's "Century of humiliation".

The opium trade faced intense enmity from Member of Parliament William Ewart Gladstone. Gladstone called it "most infamous and atrocious" referring to the opium trade between China and British India in particular. Gladstone was fiercely against both of the Opium Wars and ardently opposed to the British trade in opium to China. He lambasted it as "Palmerston's Opium War" and said that he felt "in dread of the judgments of God upon England for our national iniquity towards China" in May 1840. Gladstone criticized it as "a war more unjust in its origin, a war more calculated in its progress to cover this country with permanent disgrace,". His hostility to opium stemmed from the effects of opium brought upon his sister Helen. Due to the First Opium war brought on by Viscount Palmerston, there was initial reluctance to join the government of Robert Peel on part of Gladstone before 1841.

Unequal treaties signed at Tianjin (1858) and the Beijing (1860), with the French and British respectively, required China to legalize opium.

== American opium trade in China ==
Boston Brahmin Thomas Handasyd Perkins of Perkins & Co., the dominant American presence in the Ottoman opium business, along with a business partner and his 16‑year-old nephew John Perkins Cushing, opened operations in Guangzhou, where Russell & Co. had become the most important American opium dealer. The founders of Russell & Co., Samuel Russell, and Philip Ammedon, had set up in the Chinese city in 1808, buying opium at auction from the East India Company in Bombay, which they then shipped and illegally smuggled into Guangzhou. By 1827 Russell and Co. had become the largest American opium dealer in China, competing in the market alongside British firms including Jardine, Matheson & Co. and Dent & Co. Of all the American firms trading in China, only Olyphant & Co. and one other abstained from the opium trade.

== Domestication and suppression in the Qing dynasty ==
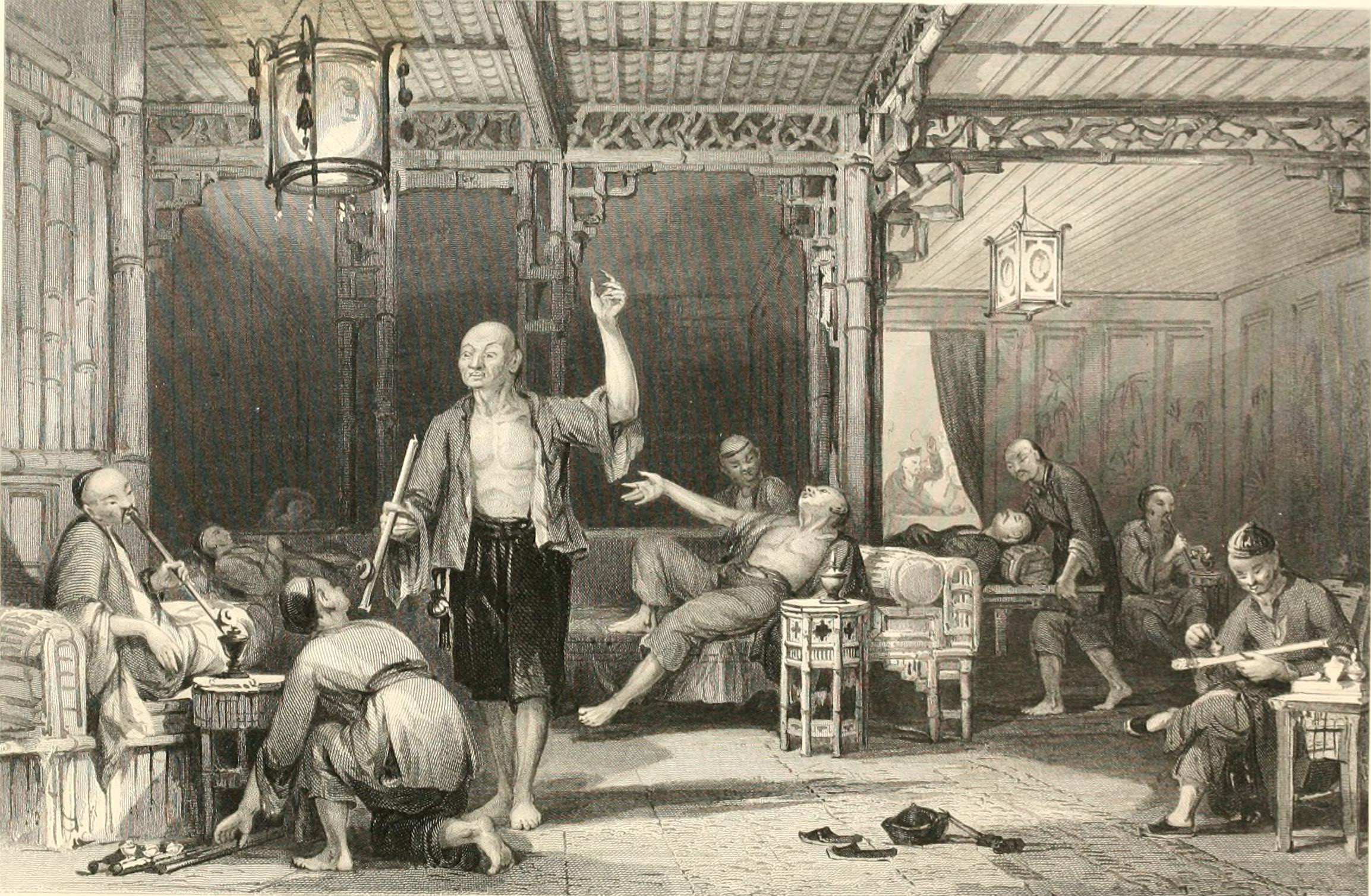
Chinese opium smokers c. 1858

Once the turmoil caused by the mid-19th century Taiping Rebellion died down, the economy came to depend on opium to play several roles. Merchants found the substance useful as a substitute for cash, as it was readily accepted in the interior provinces such as Sichuan and Yunnan while the drug weighed less than the equivalent amount of copper. Since poppies could be grown in almost any soil or weather, cultivation quickly spread. Local officials could then meet their tax quotas by relying on poppy growers even in areas where other crops had not recovered. Although the government continued to require suppression, local officials often merely went through the motions both because of bribery and because they wanted to avoid antagonizing local farmers who depended on this lucrative crop. One official complained that when people heard a government inspector was coming, they would merely pull up a few poppy stalks to spread by the side of the road to give the appearance of complying. A provincial governor observed that opium, once regarded as a poison, was treated in the same way as tea or rice. In the Qing dynasty all aspects of society had been affected by opium by the 19th century. Recreational use of opium expanded to all areas of China from the urban inland to the rural county sides. It also filtered down from the urban elites and middle class to the lower, working class citizens. By the 1880s, even governors who had initially suppressed opium smoking and poppy production depended on opium taxes. This coincided with the introduction of hypodermic morphine injection to China, a significantly more potent and thus more economical form of opiate consumption. It quickly rose in popularity and began to rival opium smoking in some areas, further exacerbating the drug addiction issue.

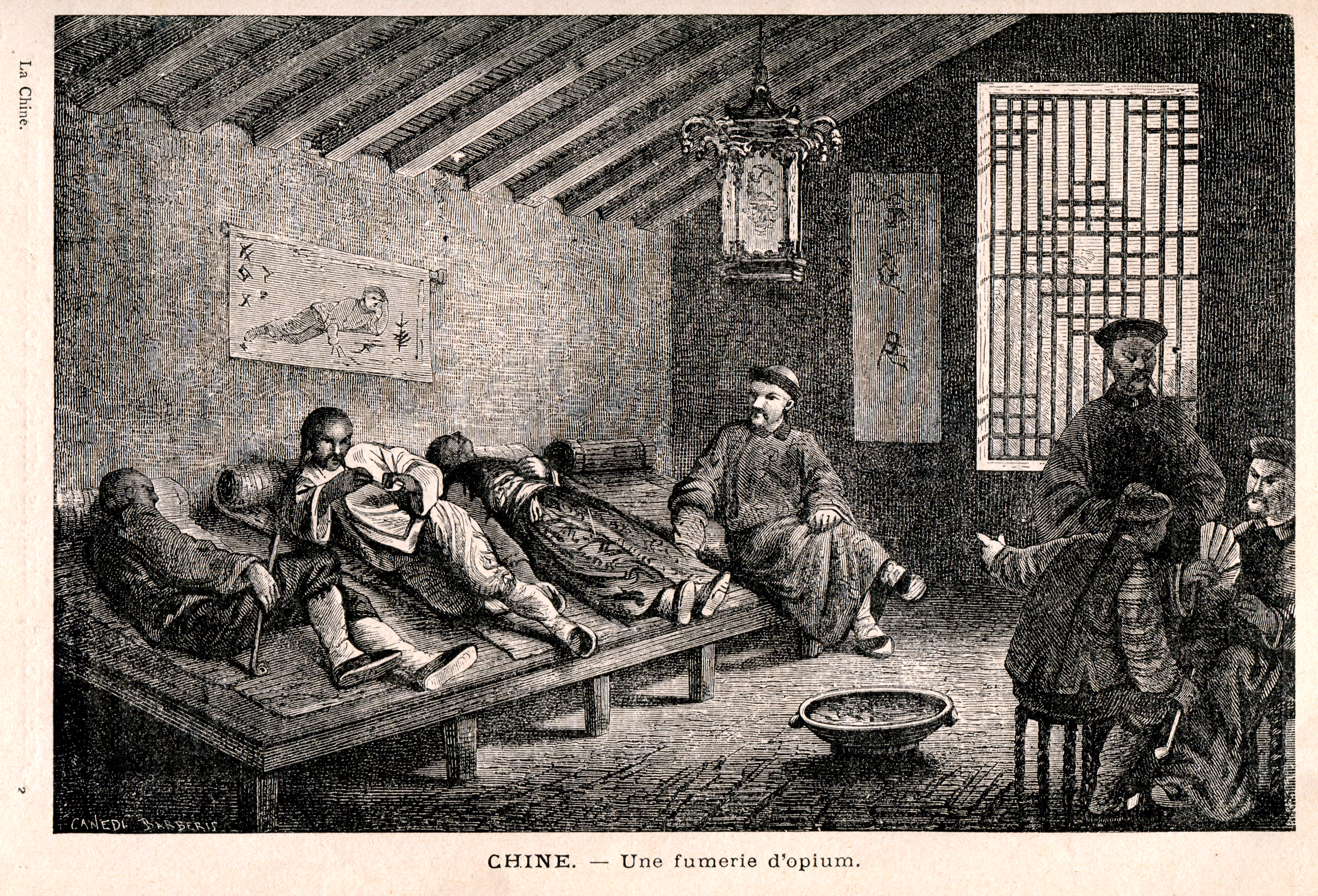
China opium den, circa 1896

Historian Jonathan Spence notes that the harm opium causes has long been clear, but that in a stagnating economy, opium supplied fluid capital and created new sources of taxes. Smugglers, poor farmers, coolies, retail merchants and officials all depended on opium for their livelihood. In the last decade of the dynasty, however, a focused moral outrage overcame these vested interests.

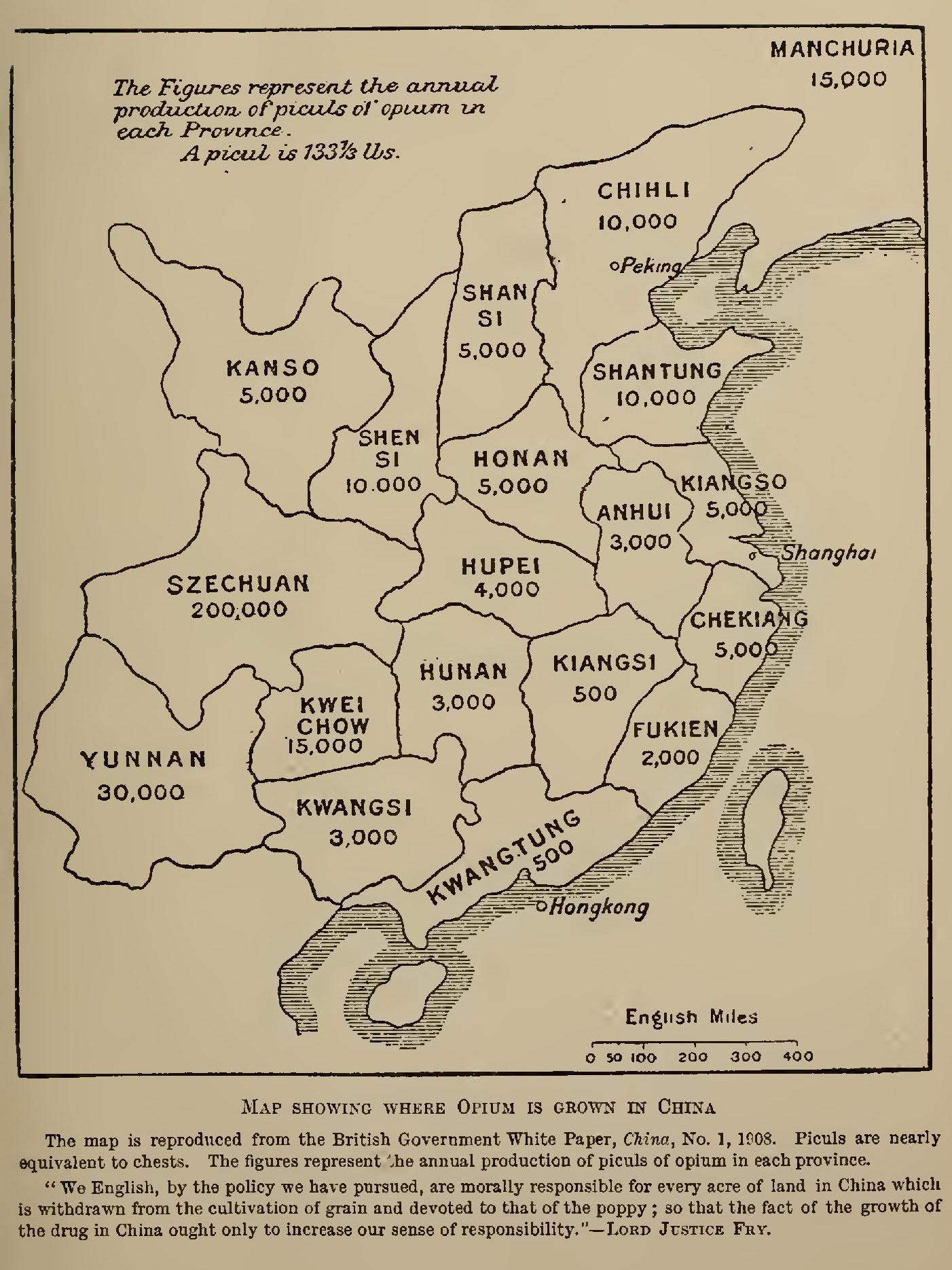
1908 opium production by province in "piculs." A picul is equal to 133.33 lbs.

When the Qing government launched new opium suppression campaigns after 1901, the opposition no longer came from the British, whose sales had suffered greatly from domestic competition in any case, but from Chinese farmers who would be wiped out by the loss of their most profitable crop derivative. Further opposition to the government moves came from wholesalers and retailers as well as from the millions of opium users, many of whom came from influential families. The government persevered, creating further dissent amongst the people and at the same time promoted cooperation with international anti-narcotic agencies. Nevertheless, despite the imposition of blanket import duties under the 1902 Mackay Treaty, Indian opium remained exempt and taxable at 110 taels per chest with the treaty stating "there was no intention of interfering with China's right to tax native opium".

The International Opium Commission observed that opium smoking was a fashionable, even refined pastime, especially among the young, yet many in society condemned the habit. Opium smoking was prevalent among students, soldiers, urban middle class, and wealthier peasants. One of the most influential groups was the sex industry as the combination of opium smoking and sex was a favored pastime.

In 1907 Great Britain signed a treaty agreeing to gradually eliminate Indian opium exports to China over the next decade while China agreed to eliminate domestic production over that period. This was paired with a renewed anti-opium campaign, achieving sizable progress by 1909: opium consumption had been reduced by about one third in Manchuria, almost eliminated in Beijing and Shanxi; cultivation was curtailed in Shandong and Sichuan. Officials were prohibited from smoking opium, and promotions were given based on the effectiveness of their drug-suppression efforts. Anti-opium societies were organized by citizens and foreign missionaries; public demonstrations and opium paraphernalia burnings were carried out. Widespread nationalist sentiments contributed to the success of the campaign, and combatting the opium epidemic was framed as a patriotic duty.

== Republican China ==
The combination of foreign and domestic efforts proved largely successful, but the fall of the Qing government in 1911 effectively meant the end of the anti-opium campaign. Local and provincial governments quickly turned back to opium as a source of revenue, and foreign governments no longer felt obliged to continue their efforts to eliminate the trade.

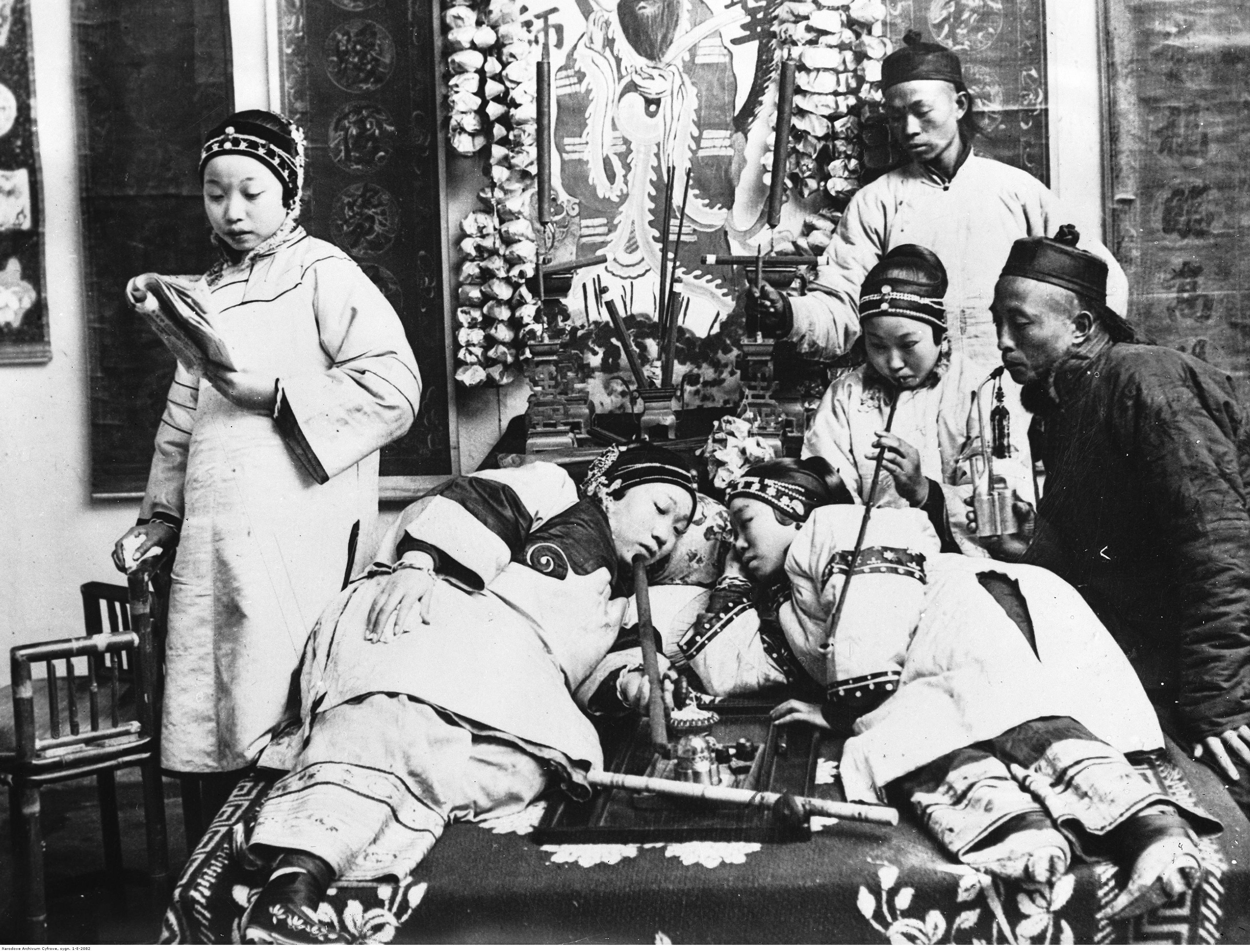
Opium smokers in an illegal den, Beijing (1932)

In the northern provinces of Ningxia and Suiyuan in China, Chinese Muslim General Ma Fuxiang both prohibited and engaged in the opium trade. It was hoped that Ma Fuxiang would have improved the situation, since Chinese Muslims were well known for opposition to smoking opium. Ma Fuxiang officially prohibited opium and made it illegal in Ningxia, but the Guominjun reversed his policy; by 1933, people from every level of society were abusing the drug, and Ningxia was left in destitution. In 1923, an officer of the Bank of China from Baotou found out that Ma Fuxiang was assisting the drug trade in opium which helped finance his military expenses. He earned $2 million from taxing those sales in 1923. General Ma had been using the bank, a branch of the government of China's exchequer, to arrange for silver currency to be transported to Baotou to use it to sponsor the trade.

The Nationalist government under General Chiang Kai-shek during the Nanjing Decade (1928–1937) followed contradictory opium policies. Chiang was morally opposed to opium use, but other government ministers saw opium as a source of much-needed revenue. The government first attempted to dissuade its citizens from using opium through social reform, then raised the official price, which discouraged a certain number of people, then sometimes shot the recidivists (strangely about one per county). Chiang turned to the Green Gang mob boss Du Yuesheng to head the Shanghai Opium Suppression Bureau. Du's operation was under general Taili, who took charge of the anti-smuggling bureau's supervision. One American diplomat remarked: "The real motive appears to be to increase revenues by drawing within the orbit of the Opium Suppression Bureau the opium traffic in the Settlement and French Concessions." Prohibition was a guise to extend the government opium monopoly. "Suppression" officials talked openly of their duty to realize more opium revenue for the government.

=== Second Sino-Japanese War and Chinese Civil War ===
In 1934, in the Shaan-Gan-Ning Border Region, the Chinese Communist Party (CCP) initially sought to curtail opium production. Peasants responded that they would leave the CCP-controlled area for Nationalist territory where they could cultivate and use opium. As a result, the CCP permitted opium cultivation in the region.

During the Second Sino-Japanese War, to raise funds the CCP in the Shaan-Gan-Ning Border Region cultivated and taxed opium production and dealing, selling to Japanese-occupied and Kuomintang provinces. By 1945 opium taxes generated over 40 percent of the CCP's revenue.

According to Jonathan Marshall, Chongqing regarded opium as a key commodity in the smuggling from Kuomintang-controlled areas including Sichuan and Yunnan to the Japanese-occupied zone, revenues from which compensated urgent government expenditures and military costs during the Chinese Civil War.

In territories occupied by Japanese forces, collaborationist governments received a large part of their funds from opium revenue. Although the narcotics trade remained nominally illegal, both local officials and Japanese military authorities often colluded with drug traffickers. As a result, opium monopolies were established and drug use in occupied areas grew. For example, the Mengjiang puppet regime in Inner Mongolia exported more than half its opium production to Shanghai between 1939 and 1942. In Japanese-occupied Shanghai, the opium trade was effectively revived by the Japanese authorities after war-related supply disruptions, with the army directly supplying it to the city and the distribution being handled by a state monopoly under the Liang Hongzhi government. After its merger with the Wang Jingwei regime, government opium profiteering continued until 1944, when prohibition was implemented, though it never bore results following the surrender of Japan and the coinciding fall of Chinese puppet states. The association of Japanese occupiers and collaborators with opium profiteering was used for propaganda purposes by both the Communist and the Nationalist side, and parallels were drawn between the Japanese invasion and the Opium Wars, fomenting opposition to drug use among the populace.

== People's Republic of China ==
By 1949, it was estimated that there were more than 20 million opium addicts across China, constituting about 4.4 percent of the population. Thus, the newly-formed government of the People's Republic of China was immediately faced with the issue of tackling opium consumption. In February 1950, the Administrative Council of the Central People's Government issued a circular order for the "Prohibition of Opium" signed by Premier Zhou Enlai. In October of the same year, the Ministry of Public Health issued an "Order for the Promulgation of the Provisional Regulation on the Control of Narcotic Drugs". A campaign against opium consumption was initiated.

Initially, the efforts towards curtailing opium consumption and production were sporadic and mostly ineffective due to the lack of resources available to the newly-formed government. However, in 1952, the "Directive on Eradication of Drug Epidemic" was issued by the Central Committee of the Chinese Communist Party, and the campaign was reinvigorated with a new wave, this time more thoroughly planned, more severe in its measures and accompanied by mass mobilization. Opium consumption was treated as a political issue of class character. Propaganda against narcotics was carried out by local CCP cells.

Meetings concerning addiction were part of the mass line. The testimony of former addicts was important at all levels of this discussion, which took place in both the mass media and small community groups and rehabilitation centers. Mass meetings, slogans, and flags used the words of ex-addicts. Addiction was denounced as anti-social and unhealthy, a result of imperialism and capitalism, and stashes of narcotics and consumption equipment were publicly burned. Consequently, opium trade was banned, and opium-producing regions were planted with other crops.

Complex measures aimed at addict rehabilitation were carried out, often compulsory: in urban centers, anti-opium clinics were opened, and in rural areas addicts were isolated and forced to bear withdrawal symptoms. Difficult cases of addiction were required to go through labor reform similar to the forced labor of landowners, businessmen, and other groups considered "social criminals". Hundreds of drug distributors were executed, and tens of thousands were imprisoned.

The Chinese government is generally credited with eradicating both consumption and production of opium during the 1950s using unrestrained repression and social reform. Although by 1953 the issue of opium consumption in urban areas of the PRC was considered to have been solved, rural poppy farming continued up until 1959, especially in areas populated by ethnic minorities, such as in Liangshan and Aba, where opium poppy cultivation and sale accounted for a significant portion of the peasants' income. Remaining opium production shifted south of the Chinese border into the Golden Triangle region.

Despite the anti-opium campaigns in the 1950s, the issue of narcotics consumption resurfaced in the 1980s as a result of government reform. The 1990s saw a renewed push against drug consumption in China, with annual drug trials and public events being held around June 26, the International Day Against Drug Abuse and Illicit Trafficking. In 2003, China was estimated to have four million regular drug users and one million registered drug addicts.

== See also ==
- Illegal drug trade in China
- Madak
- Old China Trade
- Levant Company
- David Sassoon (treasurer)

== Notes ==
1. Yingsu (罂粟) refers to the poppy, Papaver somniferum, and was used an alternative name for opium.
2. Jisu water (鸡 苏 水) is 'chicken broth water', i.e. chicken soup.
3. A chest of opium contained approximately 100 "catties" or 1 "picul", with each catty weighing 1.33 lb (600 g), giving a total of ~140 pounds (64 kg)

== Bibliography ==
- Baumler, Alan (2001). Modern China and Opium: A Reader. Ann Arbor: University of Michigan Press. ISBN 9780472067688.
- Baumler, Alan (2007). The Chinese and Opium under the Republic: Worse Than Floods and Wild Beasts. Albany: State University of New York Press. ISBN 978-0791469538.
- Brewster, David (1832). The Edinburgh encyclopaedia. Vol. 11. J. and E. Parker.
- Ebrey, Patricia Buckley (2010). "9. Manchus and Imperialism: The Qing Dynasty 1644–1900". The Cambridge Illustrated History of China (second ed.). Cambridge University Press. ISBN 978-0-521-19620-8.
- Ebrey, Patricia Buckley; Walthall, Anne (2013). East Asia: A Cultural, Social, and Political History. Cengage Learning. ISBN 9781285528670.
- Brook, Timothy; Wakabayashi, Bob Tadashi (2000). Opium Regimes: China, Britain, and Japan, 1839–1952. University of California Press. ISBN 9780520222366.
- Keswick, Maggie; Weatherall, Clara (2008). The Thistle and the Jade: A Celebration of 175 Years of Jardine Matheson. Frances Lincoln. ISBN 9780711228306.
- Kiple, Kenneth F. (2007). A Movable Feast: Ten Millennia of Food Globalization. doi:10.1017/cbo9780511512148. ISBN 978-0-521-79353-7. OL 5367545W. Wikidata Q111679724.
- Greenberg, Michael (1969). British Trade and the Opening of China, 1800–42. Cambridge Studies in Economic History. Cambridge: Cambridge University Press.
- Hanes, W. Travis; Sanello, Frank (2002). Opium Wars: The Addiction of One Empire and the Corruption of Another. Sourcebooks. ISBN 9781402201493.. popular history.
- Layton, Thomas N. (1997). The Voyage of the 'Frolic': New England Merchants and the Opium Trade. Stanford University Press. ISBN 9780804729093.
- Lowes, Peter D. (1966). The Genesis of International Narcotics Control. Librairie Droz. ISBN 978-2-600-04030-3.
- Lovell, Julia (2012). The Opium War: Drugs, Dreams and the Making of China. Picador. ISBN 978-1-4472-0410-7. (Kindle version)
- Li, Xiaobing; Fang, Qiang (2013). Modern Chinese Legal Reform: New Perspectives. Asia in the new millennium. University Press of Kentucky. ISBN 9780813141206.
- Parker, Edward Harper; Wei, Yuan (1888). 圣武记 [Chinese Account of the Opium War]. The Pagoda Library. Shanghai: Kelly & Walsh.
- Zheng, Yangwen (2005). The Social Life of Opium in China. Cambridge University Press. ISBN 9780521846080.
