= James Whittall =

British tai-pan

James Whittall was a 19th-century taipan of Jardine Matheson & Co. and member of the Legislative Council of Hong Kong.

Whittall was appointed an unofficial member in Legislative Council in 1864. After John Dent resigned in 1867, he became the Senior Unofficial Member. He went on leave later that year, and William Keswick held the seat for him until 1872. Whittall remained an unofficial member in the Legislative Council until he resigned in 1875, and Keswick replaced him again.

Whittall was heavily involved with Jardine Matheson & Co.; the silk trade company in Japan during a time with strong foreign trade restriction.

Legislative Council of Hong Kong
Preceded by Alexander Perceval	Unofficial Member; 1864–1867; With: Charles Wilson Murray (1864–1865); Francis Chomley (1864–1866); Thomas Sutherland (1865–1866); John Dent, Hugh Bold Gibb (1866–1867)	Succeeded by William Keswick
Preceded by William Keswick	Unofficial Member; 1872–1875; With: Henry John Ball (1872–1873); Phineas Ryrie, William Hastings Alexander (1872–1875); Richard Rowett (1873–1875)	Succeeded by William Keswick
Preceded by John Dent	Senior Unofficial Member; 1860	Succeeded by H. B. Gibb
