= Joseph Jardine =

- Born: c. 1822
- Died: 1861; Castlemilk
- Relatives: Dr. William Jardine (uncle)

Joseph Jardine (c. 1822 - 1861) was a taipan of the Jardine Matheson & Co. and member of the Legislative Council of Hong Kong.

Joseph was the nephew of Dr. William Jardine, founder of the Jardine Matheson & Co., and younger brother of David Jardine. He followed the family tradition by going to China in 1843 and being given a partnership in Jardine Matheson & Co. He succeeded his elder brother David, becoming taipan of the trading firm and unofficial member of the Legislative Council after David's death in 1856.

He retired in 1860 at the age of 38 and died next year at Castlemilk, an estate bought for him by his brother.

== See also ==
- Family tree of William Jardine (1784-1843)

Legislative Council of Hong Kong
| Preceded by David Jardine | Unofficial Member; 1857–1860; Served alongside: John Dent, George Lyall, Francis Chomley, Angus Fletcher, Charles Wilson Murray | Succeeded by Alexander Perceval |
| Preceded by David Jardine | Senior Unofficial Member; 1857–1860 | Succeeded by George Lyall |
