= Hugh Bold Gibb =

British businessman (1831–1882)

Unofficial Member of the Legislative Council of Hong Kong
- In office 18 May 1866 – 11 November 1870
- Appointed by: Sir Richard MacDonnell
- Preceded by: Thomas Sutherland
- Succeeded by: Richard Rowett
- In office 29 May 1879 – 30 December 1879
- Appointed by: Sir John Pope Hennessy
- Preceded by: Henry Lowcock
- Succeeded by: Ng Choy

Personal details
- Born: bapt. 9 December 1831 Rugby, Warwickshire, England
- Died: 22 April 1882 Chiswick, London, England

Hugh Bold Gibb (bapt. 9 December 1831 – 22 April 1882) was a British businessman in Hong Kong and China and member of the Legislative Council of Hong Kong.

Gibb was a senior partner of the firm Gibb, Livingston & Co. from July 1855. He was also director of the other companies including the China Fire Insurance Company. He was elected chairman of the Hong Kong General Chamber of Commerce in 1864.

Gibb was appointed a member of the Legislative Council of Hong Kong in 1866 during the absence of Thomas Sutherland. He served until 1871 when he resigned and was replaced by Richard Rowett. He was appointed again to the Legislative Council in 1879 on the resignation of Henry Lowcock. He was replaced by Ng Choy in 1880, the latter becoming the first Chinese member of the Legislative Council on his appointment.

In November 1881, Gibb was admitted to the Manor House lunatic asylum in Chiswick, where he died the following spring.

Legislative Council of Hong Kong
Preceded by Thomas Sutherland	Unofficial Member; 1866–1870; Served alongside: John Dent, James Whittall, Phineas Ryrie, William Keswick, James Banks Taylor, Henry John Ball, Richard Rowett	Succeeded by Richard Rowett
Preceded by James Whittall	Senior Unofficial Member; 1867–1870	Succeeded by Phineas Ryrie
Preceded by Henry Lowcock	Unofficial Member; 1879; Served alongside: Phineas Ryrie, William Keswick	Succeeded by Ng Choy
