= Henry Lowcock =

Henry W. Lowcock
- Born: 1837; Middlesex, England
- Died: 1901 (aged 63–64)
- Occupation: Businessman

Henry W. Lowcock (c. 1837 – 1901) was an English businessman in Hong Kong and member of the Legislative Council of Hong Kong.

== Early years ==
Lowcock was born in Middlesex, England in about 1837.

== Career ==
He joined Gibb, Livingston & Co., a prominent trading firm in Hong Kong and China, and became a partner in July 1868 following the retirement of Edward Ford Duncanson and William Henry Gibb.

Lowcock was appointed to the Police Inquiry Commission in 1871 and was subsequently appointed to the Legislative Council of Hong Kong on 26 February 1872 as an interim replacement for Richard Rowett, who was on leave. He was re-appointed to the Legislative Council on 23 January 1875 upon Rowett's resignation. He was a Trustee of St. John's Cathedral. He retired from Gibb, Livingston & Co. on 31 March 1882.

== Personal life and family ==
Lowcock married Annie Loftus Russell on 7 June 1873 at St John's Cathedral, Hong Kong. According to her inscription on their shared gravestone in Wimbledon, London, "our only child" was Henry Christopher, buried in Hong Kong. He was born and died on 31 May 1874, according to his gravestone in Happy Valley cemetery, HK.

Lowcock was one of the earliest supporters of the Diocesan Home and Orphanage (now the Diocesan Boys' School, Hong Kong).

He and Annie settled in the UK after his retirement from Gibb and Livingston Co. He died on 31 July 1901 in Wimbledon, Surrey.

Prior to his marriage, Henry had 3 other children by at least one other woman. One of the descendants of these children was Sidney James Lowcock, the seventh headmaster of Diocesan Boys' School from 1961 to 1983. Sidney's father Henry married Mabel Kotewall, niece of Sir Robert Kotewall. He served in the No.320 Maintenance Unit of the Royal Air Force during the Second World War, and was killed in a shop accident in Karachi.

Legislative Council of Hong Kong
Preceded by Richard Rowett	Unofficial Member; 1872	Succeeded by Richard Rowett
Preceded by Richard Rowett	Unofficial Member; 1875–1879	Succeeded by Hugh Bold Gibb
