= George Lyall =

George Lyall may refer to:

- George Lyall (1779–1853), British businessman, Member of Parliament (MP) for the City of London 1833–1835 and 1841–1847
- George Lyall (1819–1881), Member of Parliament (MP) for Whitehaven 1857–1865
- George Lyall (footballer) (born 1947), Scottish footballer (Raith Rovers, Preston North End, Nottingham Forest, Hull City)
- George Lyall (merchant), merchant in Hong Kong region and unofficial member of Legislative Council in 1860–1861
