= Jinkee =

Jinkee may refer to:

- Jinkee Pacquiao (born 1979), Filipina politician
- Gibb, Livingston & Co., a trading firm known in Chinese as Jinkee
