= Jamieson, How & Co. =

British trading firm

The Jamieson, How & Co. was a British trading firm in the Far East existed in the 19th century.

The firm of Jamieson, How & Co. was established around 1817 with Andrew Jamieson in Glasgow, his brother Robert in Calcutta and William M'Cracken in Liverpool. From 1835, Robert and Andrew became residents in Liverpool where the firm was under the name of Jamieson Brothers while it was under Jamieson, How & Co. in Glasgow. The Glasgow branch ceased to exist around 1849 but the Liverpool one continued until 1864. The firm also had a branch at Calcutta, Hong Kong and Canton, while George Jamieson was the head of the branch in England.

The firm acquired the land Marine Lot 32 at the first land sale of June 1841 after Hong Kong was ceded to Britain from China in the First Opium War. Joseph Frost Edger, who managed the firm in China until 1851 when he established a business on his own, was appointed the first unofficial member of the Legislative Council of Hong Kong with David Jardine of the Jardine, Matheson & Co. in 1850.

The firm became Jamieson, Gifford & Co. in 1850 after John Gifford, the managing partner at Calcutta became partner. It was dissolved in 1855 by the mutual consent of the partners.
