= N31 road (Ireland) =

Road in Ireland

N31 road
- Bóthar N31

Route information
- Length: 7.11 km (4.42 mi)

Location
- Country: Ireland
- Primary destinations: (bypassed routes in italics): Dún Laoghaire–Rathdown; (M50 J14); Stillorgan; (Joins/departs N11); Blackrock; Monkstown; Dún Laoghaire

Highway system
- Roads in Ireland; Motorways; Primary; Secondary; Regional

The N31 road is a national primary road in Ireland. It connects the harbour at Dún Laoghaire southeast of Dublin to the national route network. Both the N11 (Dublin – Wexford) and Dublin's M50 C-ring motorway connect to the N31.

== Route ==
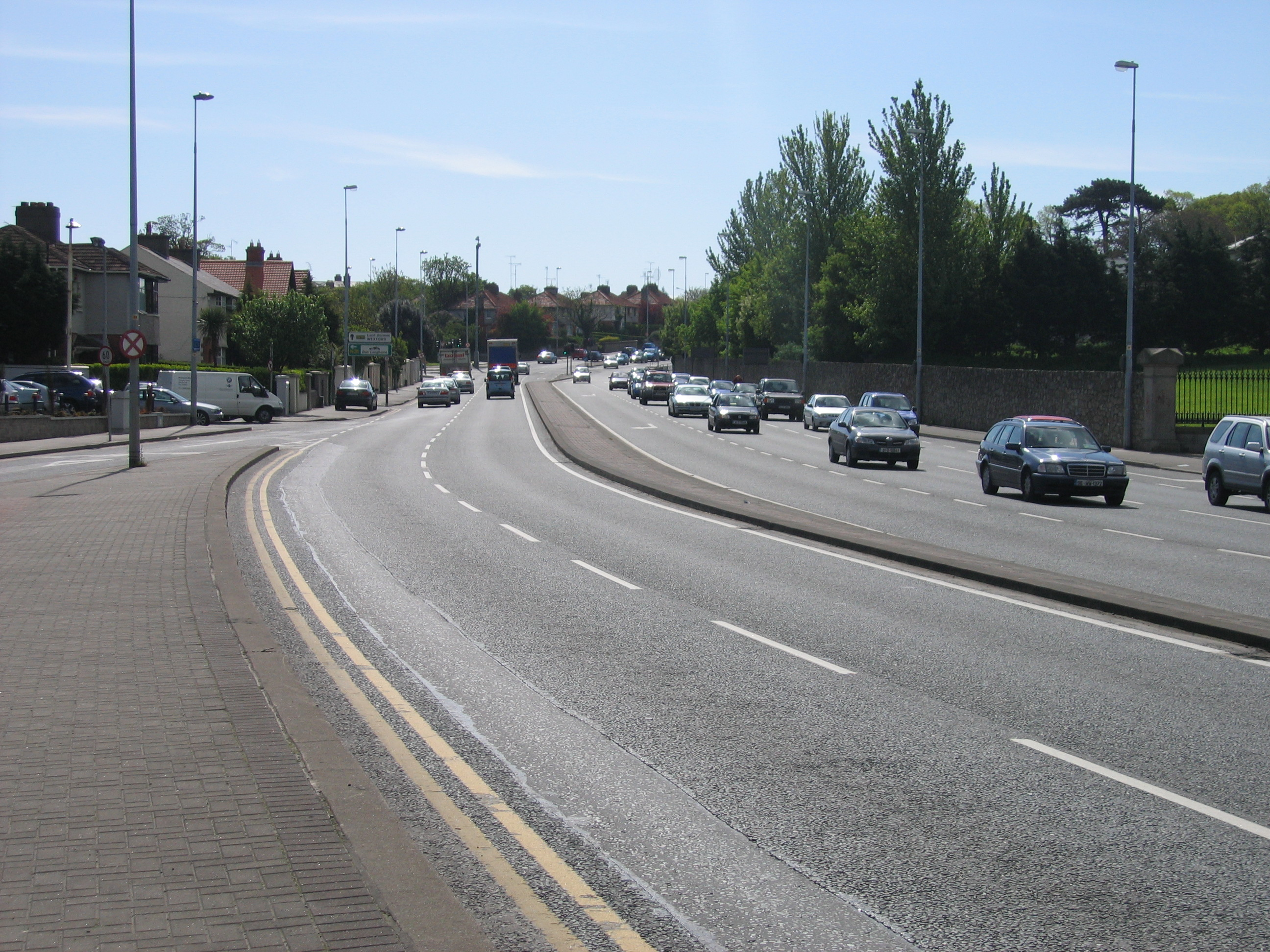
N31 Blackrock By-Pass

With the completion of the Southeastern Motorway section of the M50 in 2005, the N31 was extended to connect to it. Since 2006, the N31 begins at J14 on the M50. Leopardstown Road and Brewery Road bring the N31 northeast to join the N11 Stillorgan Road southeast of Stillorgan.

The route diverges from the N11 again further north as Mount Merrion Avenue, bringing the N31 east to the sea front. From here, the N31 passes through Blackrock via Frescati Road/Blackrock By Pass; (see thumbnail) alongside Monkstown via Temple Road, Newtown Avenue and Seapoint Avenue; and to Dún Laoghaire via Dunleary Road and Crofton Road.

== Upgrades ==
The route was revised in 2005 to include a new section between the M50 and N11. No further planned amendments to the route have been publicised as of 2015, but the N31 would be affected in the event of an Eastern Bypass of Dublin. The current M50 would connect at the southern end of this via a link on a similar alignment to the first half of the current N31.

A major upgrade of the Blackrock By-pass commenced on 18 August 2014 from its junction with Mount Merrion Avenue to Stradbrook Road which was completed on 31 August 2015. It was undertaken by Dún Laoghaire–Rathdown County Council.

In November 2016, the Dublin Bus route 7 from Loughlinstown Park to Mountjoy Square was split into two routes; the 7 and 7a. The purpose of this was to make the journey time on the 7 quicker by using the Blackrock bypass (N31). The 4 bus route also uses the Blackrock bypass.

Go-Ahead Ireland's route S6 from Blackrock railway station to The Square, Tallaght) also uses the N31. It serves the Blackrock Bypass and Mount Merrion Avenue parts of the N31.

The section from Blackrock to Dun Laoghaire is a one-way system, with the former eastbound lane converted to a segregated cycle lane in 2020.

== See also ==
- Roads in Ireland
- Motorways in Ireland
- National secondary road
- Regional road
