= John Dent (merchant) =

British merchant (1821-1892)

Unofficial Member of the Legislative Council of Hong Kong
- In office 26 December 1857 – 8 November 1861
- Appointed by: Sir George Bowen
- Preceded by: J. F. Edger
- Succeeded by: Francis Chomley
- In office 12 May 1866 – 20 June 1867
- Preceded by: Francis Chomley
- Succeeded by: Phineas Ryrie

Chairman of the Shanghai Municipal Council
- In office April 1871 – January 1873
- Preceded by: George Dixwell
- Succeeded by: Robert Fearon

Chairman of the Hongkong & Shanghai Banking Corporation
- In office January 1866 – February 1867
- Preceded by: Francis Chomley
- Succeeded by: E. Cunningham

Personal details
- Born: c. 1821
- Died: 1892 (aged 71)
- Occupation: Businessman

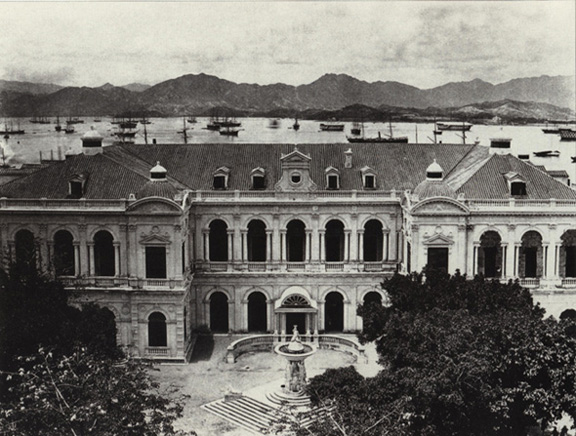
The fountain in front of the old City Hall was built on the donation of John Dent.

John Dent (1821–1892) was a British merchant with the trading firm Dent & Co., a former member of the Legislative Council of Hong Kong and chairman of the Shanghai Municipal Council.

== Biography ==
John was born in 1821 in Madras, India. His uncle Thomas John Dent established Dent & Co. in Canton in the 1820s, while two other uncles, Lancelot and Wilkinson Dent, became senior partners of the firm, turning it into one of the largest hongs in China and early colonial Hong Kong.

John Dent joined Dent & Co. and became the senior partner of the firm. In 1863, he was elected the third chairman of the Hong Kong General Chamber of Commerce. He played a leading role in the establishment of the Hongkong and Shanghai Banking Company and was one of the proprietors when the bank was incorporated in 1866.

He returned to London in 1864 with a fortune of about £800,000, which he had amassed in China. He helped establish the Blakely Ordnance Company and became its chairman with capital of £120,000.

John Dent was appointed an unofficial justice of the peace in 1844. In 1857, he was appointed member of the Legislative Council of Hong Kong. He resigned from the office in 1861 and replaced by Francis Chomley, another partner of Dent & Co.

He was reappointed to the Legislative Council in 1866. He resigned in 1867 after the firm went bankrupt and was replaced by Phineas Ryrie.

Dent was also appointed consul for the Kingdom of Sardinia and later the Kingdom of Italy in Hong Kong from 1858 to 1867.

Dent & Co. went bankrupt in 1867 during the worldwide financial crisis which originated in 1866 in London. They suffered a loss of no less than £200,000 by the malversations of a Portuguese clerk in their employment at Shanghai who was sentenced to seven years imprisonment. The petition for adjudication of bankruptcy was filed in the Supreme Court of Hong Kong on 29 June 1867. Dent had to remove his headquarters in Shanghai and sold the Dent Building to the Hong Kong Hotel Co.

Dent was known for his opulent lifestyle. He was reported to have spent £10,000 on a racehorse to win the Hong Kong cup. The clock-tower at the end of Pedder Street and the entrance to Queen's Road in Central, Hong Kong, erected by public subscription in 1862, was at his suggestion; its initial design had to be stripped of its original decorative features, owing to the waning enthusiasm of the community. John Dent also donated a fountain at the entrance of the old City Hall.

In 1870, Dent reopened Dent & Co in Shanghai in the premises previously occupied by his old firm. In April 1871, he became the Chairman of the Shanghai Municipal Council and served in that position until January 1873.

Legislative Council of Hong Kong
New seat	Unofficial Member; 1857–1861; With: Joseph Jardine, George Lyall (1857–1860); Alexander Perceval, Angus Fletcher (1860–1861)	Succeeded by Francis Chomley
Preceded by Francis Chomley	Unofficial Member; 1866–1867; Served alongside: James Whittall, Hugh Bold Gibb	Succeeded by Phineas Ryrie
Preceded by Francis Chomley	Senior Unofficial Member; 1866–1867	Succeeded by James Whittall
Business positions
Preceded by Francis Chomley	Chairman of the Hongkong and Shanghai Banking Corporation; 1866–1867	Succeeded by E. Cunningham
