= M50 Roma encampment =

Romani encampment in Ireland

The M50 Roma encampment was an encampment of around 100 Romani people from north-west Romania who made a temporary home at a roundabout on the M50 motorway in the Ballymun district of Dublin's northside, through the summer of 2007.

In July 2007, they were deported from Ireland, by order of immigration minister Conor Lenihan.

== Background ==
The Romani are one of the largest ethnic minority groups in Eastern Europe but are among the most oppressed. During the reign of Nicolae Ceaucescu, crimes against the Romani were often ignored or not reported so as not to stir up racial tensions, but after the fall of Communism, there were a number of multiethnic riots in major cities over the next two decades. This led some to seek asylum in other parts of Europe, particularly after Romania's 2007 accession to the European Union.

== The camp ==
The camp was set up by a group of about 100 Romani people from the north-western Romanian village of Tileagd, in search of a better life in Ireland. They sheltered beneath tents and plastic coverings, earning very small amounts of money from passing motorists and begging in the city centre. Irish social welfare laws stipulated that to claim benefits an individual had to have lived in Ireland for two years, and therefore the people of the Romani encampment were not eligible for aid. To survive, they relied on various charities and Catholic groups.

Though the site was squalid, consisting of little more than makeshift tents and sheets on muddy ground, the Romani claimed conditions at the camp were better than at home. These claims were disputed by both the Romanian ambassador to Ireland, Silvia Stancu Davidoiu, and media outlets including The Guardian.

== Removal of the camp ==
The initial response of the government was to offer the group free flights back to Romania, but they refused.

In July, 57 of the group left the camp voluntarily and were repatriated to Romania the following day. Thirty-five people refused to leave and intended to oppose their deportation orders but were later deported. Some of those who chose to stay were living in a second site, in a derelict cottage nearby.

Minister for Justice Brian Lenihan justified the deportation by claiming that the Romanian community in Ireland had advised him that if the Romani people were allowed to remain, thousands more would follow.
