= M50 motorway (Ireland) =

Ring road around Dublin

M50 motorway
- Mótarbhealach M50
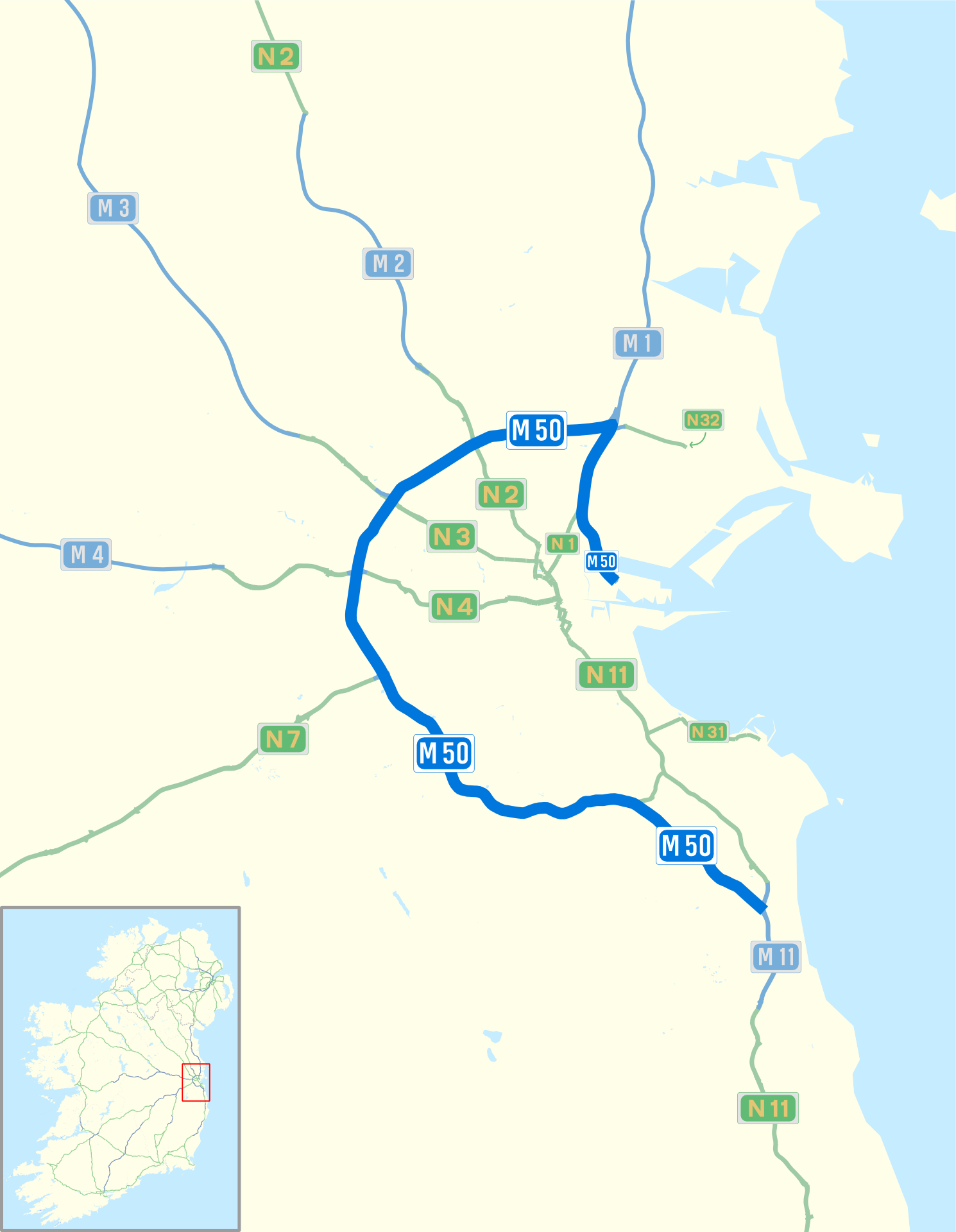
- Clickable image

Route information
- Length: 45.5 km (28.3 mi)
- Existed: 1990–present
- History: Completed 1990–2005; Upgraded 2006–2010

Major junctions
- From: Dublin Port
- J3 → M1 motorway J5 → N2 road J6 → N3 road J7 → N4 road J9 → N7 road J11 → N81 road J14 → N31 road J17 → M11 motorway
- To: Shankill

Location
- Country: Ireland
- Primary destinations: Dublin, Finglas, Blanchardstown, Ballymount, Tallaght, Sandyford

Highway system
- Roads in Ireland; Motorways; Primary; Secondary; Regional

The M50 motorway (Irish: Mótarbhealach M50) is a C-shaped ring road in Dublin and the busiest motorway in Ireland. The current route was built in various sections over the course of 43 years, from 1983 to 2026. It begins at Dublin Port, running northward through the Dublin Port Tunnel and along a portion of the Airport Motorway. It then turns west at its junction with the M1, circling the northern, western and southern suburbs of Dublin, before merging with the M11 at Shankill in South East Dublin. The road forms part of European route E01.

An orbital motorway for Dublin was first proposed in the Dublin Transportation Study of 1971. Construction began on the first section, the Western Parkway (J6-J11) in 1987, and opened to traffic in 1990. This was followed by the Northern Cross Route (J3-J6) in 1996, the Southern Cross Route (J11-J13) in 2001, and the Southeastern Motorway (J13-J17) in 2005. The M50 route was extended to Dublin Port in 2006, via a section of the 1985 Airport Motorway (up to then a part of the M1) and the newly opened Dublin Port Tunnel.

A massive upgrade project commenced in early 2006 due to the motorway's chronic capacity problems. Lanes were added J3-J13, and many of the low-capacity roundabout interchanges were replaced with free-flowing interchanges. These upgrades were completed in 2010.

Motorists have paid nearly €2.2 billion in M50 tolls between the 2008 State buyout and early 2025

== Layout ==
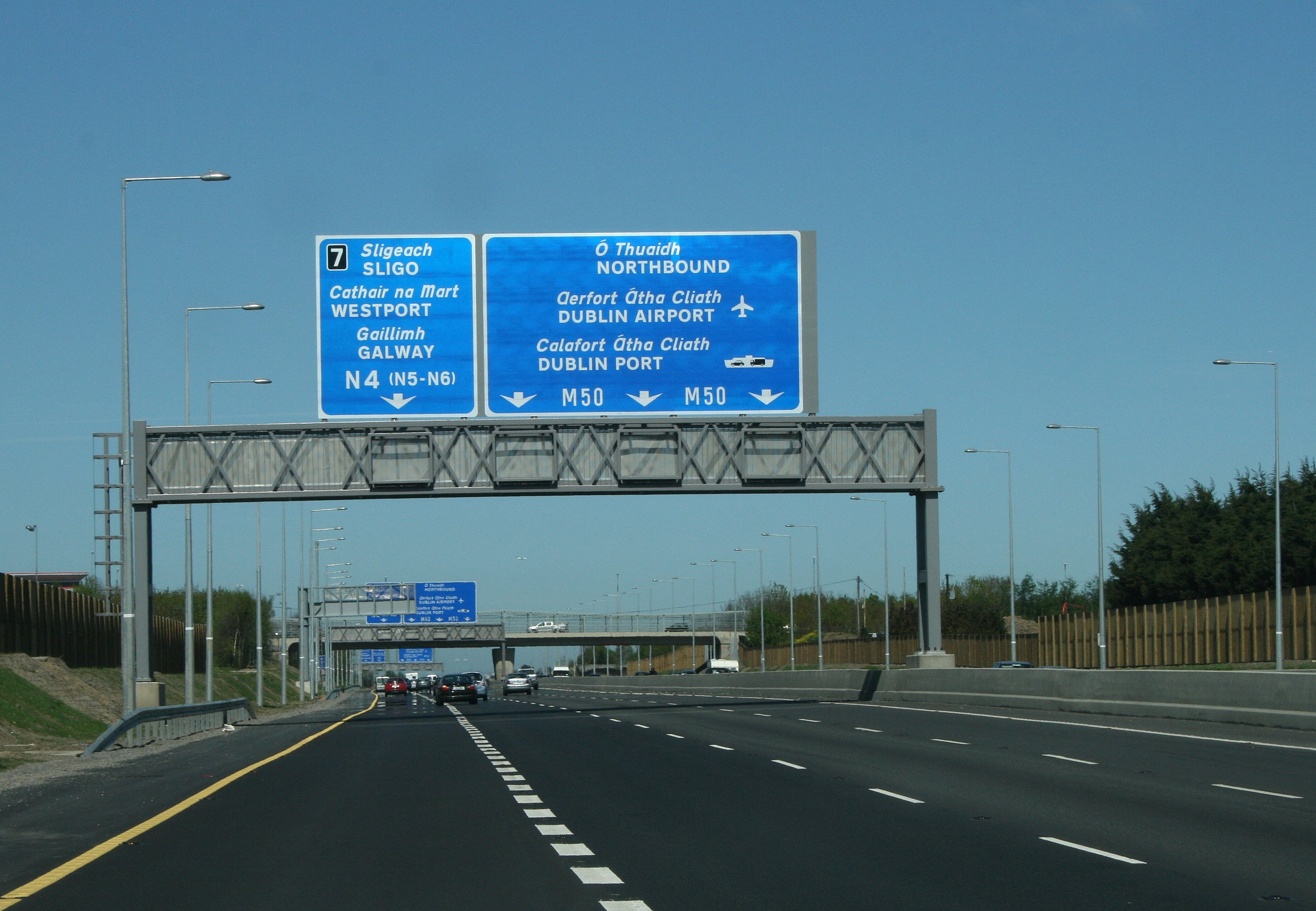
4-lane section of M50

The M50 was originally planned to divert traffic travelling on National Primary Routes away from the city (a full bypass of Dublin). Due to urban expansion and sprawl, it now runs through Dublin's suburbs and serves as a route within Dublin, connecting the suburbs.

All of the National Primary Routes radiating from Dublin begin at their junctions with the M50. The junctions were originally in the form of grade-separated signal-controlled roundabout junctions, not free-flowing interchanges. The M50 mainline itself was free-flow through all junctions. The other primary routes served are the N1/M1 to Belfast/Dundalk/Newry, N2 to Derry/ Letterkenny/Monaghan/Ardee, N3 to Cavan/Donegal/Navan, N4/M4 (N5) (M6) to Galway/Sligo/Westport/Lucan, N7/M7 (M8) (M9) to Cork/Limerick/Waterford/Kilkenny/Naas, N81 to Tullow/Baltinglass/Blessington/and the N11/M11 to Wexford/Arklow/Wicklow/Bray. Additional junctions along the motorway serve other suburbs of Dublin such as Ballymun, Blanchardstown, Cherrywood, Dundrum, Sandyford and Tallaght.

Most of these interchanges were subject to high levels of traffic congestion, as was the former toll plaza north of the West-Link bridge. The busier roundabout junctions were signal-controlled, with tailbacks extending for several kilometres at rush hour. The most infamous was the Red Cow Roundabout junction with the N7, jokingly dubbed the "Mad Cow Roundabout". As well as being the junction of two of the busiest roads in the State, the Luas tram Red Line from Tallaght to the city centre used to cross two slip roads at-grade, before continuing city-bound in the median of the R110 (formerly N7). As part of the M50 upgrade works (see below), these at-grade crossings were removed, and in December 2008, the completely reconstructed interchange was open. This greatly reduced the congestion at the once-notorious traffic black spot.

The roundabout at the N3 is also notable as the Royal Canal and the Dublin-Sligo railway line pass through its centre.

The original speed limit on the M50 was 70 mph (112 km/h). The Southern Cross Route from J12-J13 was given a lower limit of 60 mph (96 km/h), due to its more undulating, twisting route. The route from J3-J13 was changed to 100 km/h after the Republic of Ireland's speed limits became metric in 2005, while the Southeastern Motorway section (J13-J17) became 120 km/h. The Airport Motorway-Port Tunnel section of the route from J1-J3 has a speed limit of 80 km/h due to the closely packed junctions and heavy volume of weaving traffic. Average speed camera technology is in operation in the Port Tunnel section of the M50.

== Junctions ==
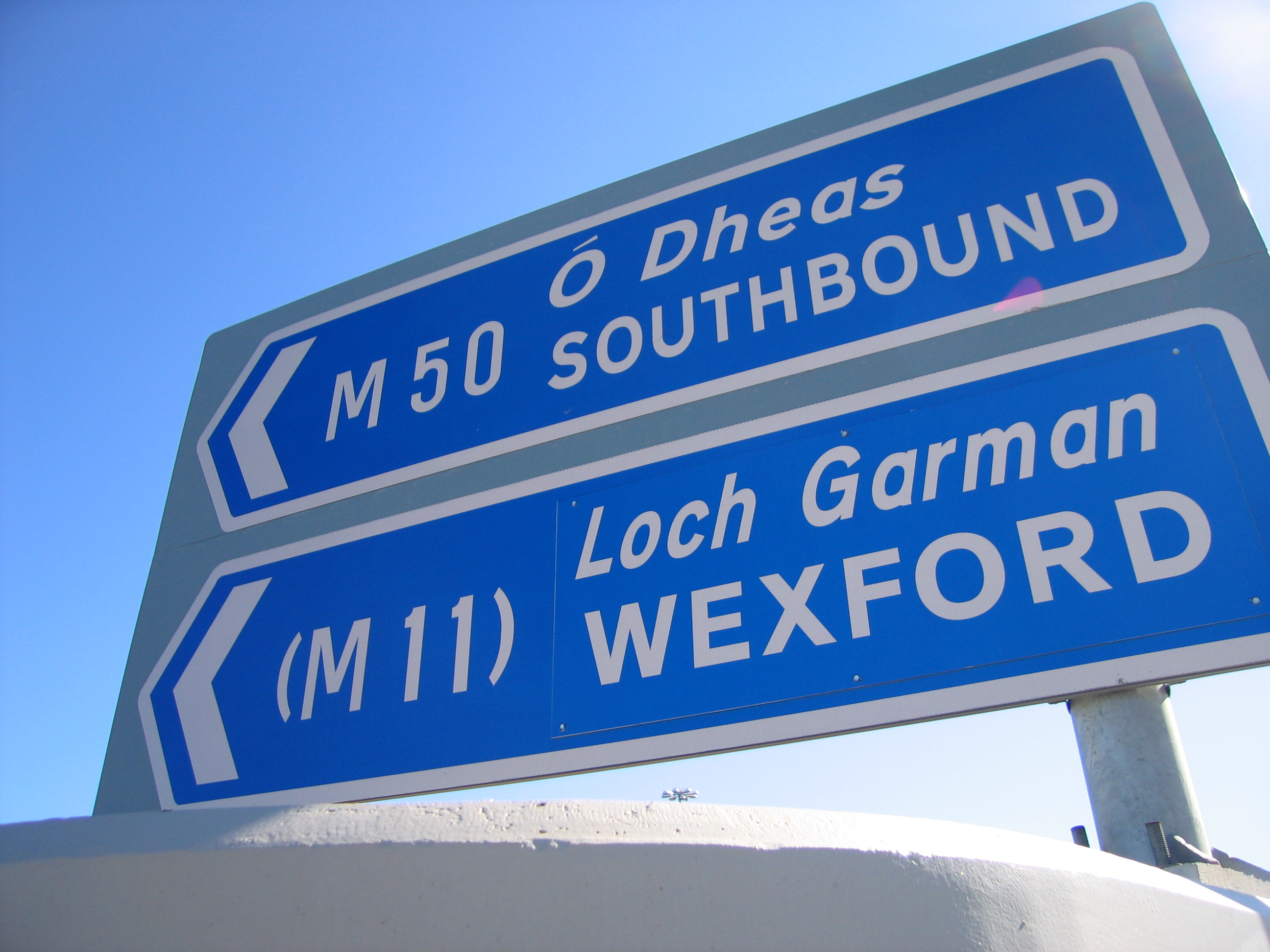
M50 access ramp

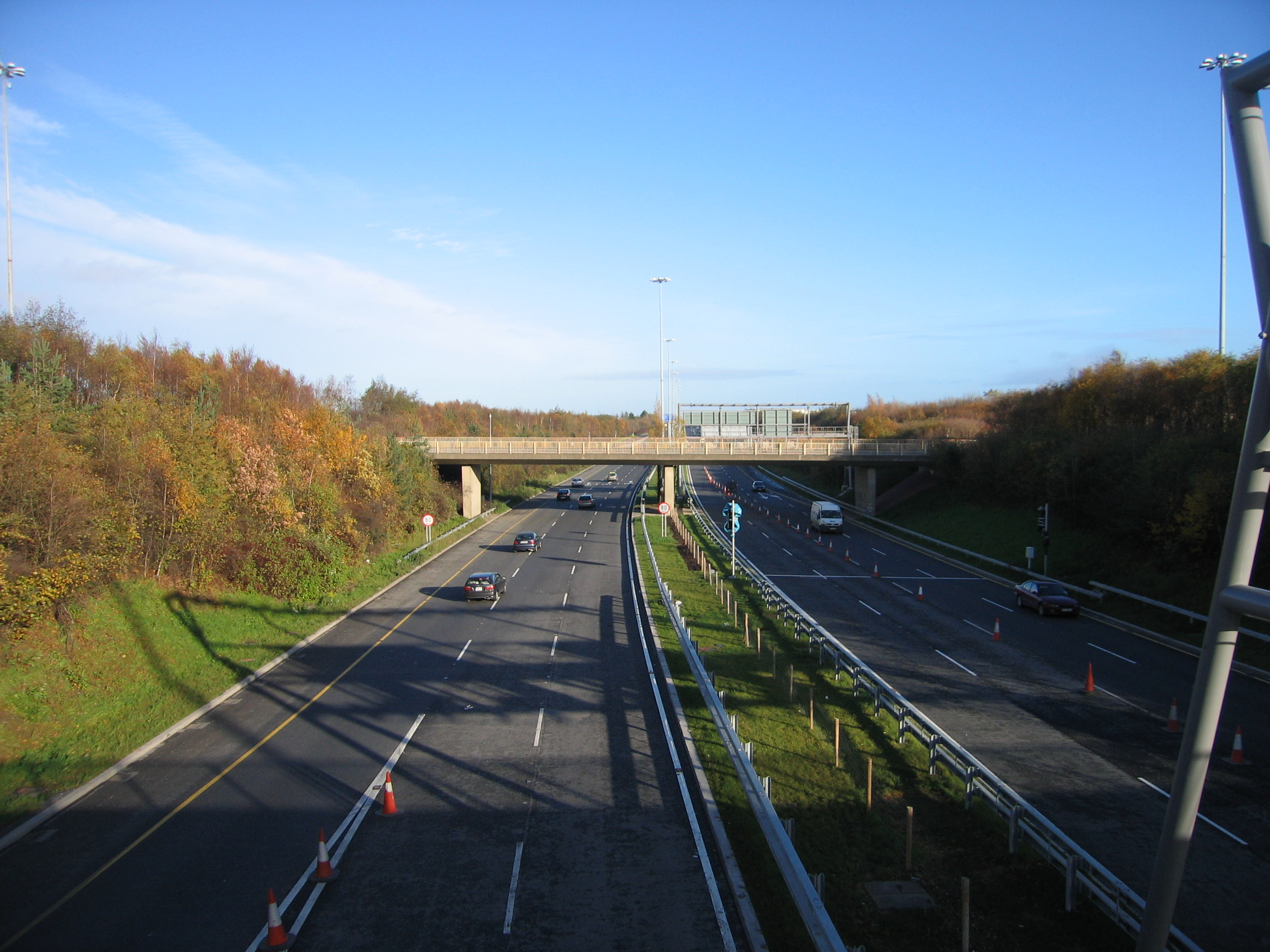
Between J1 and J2

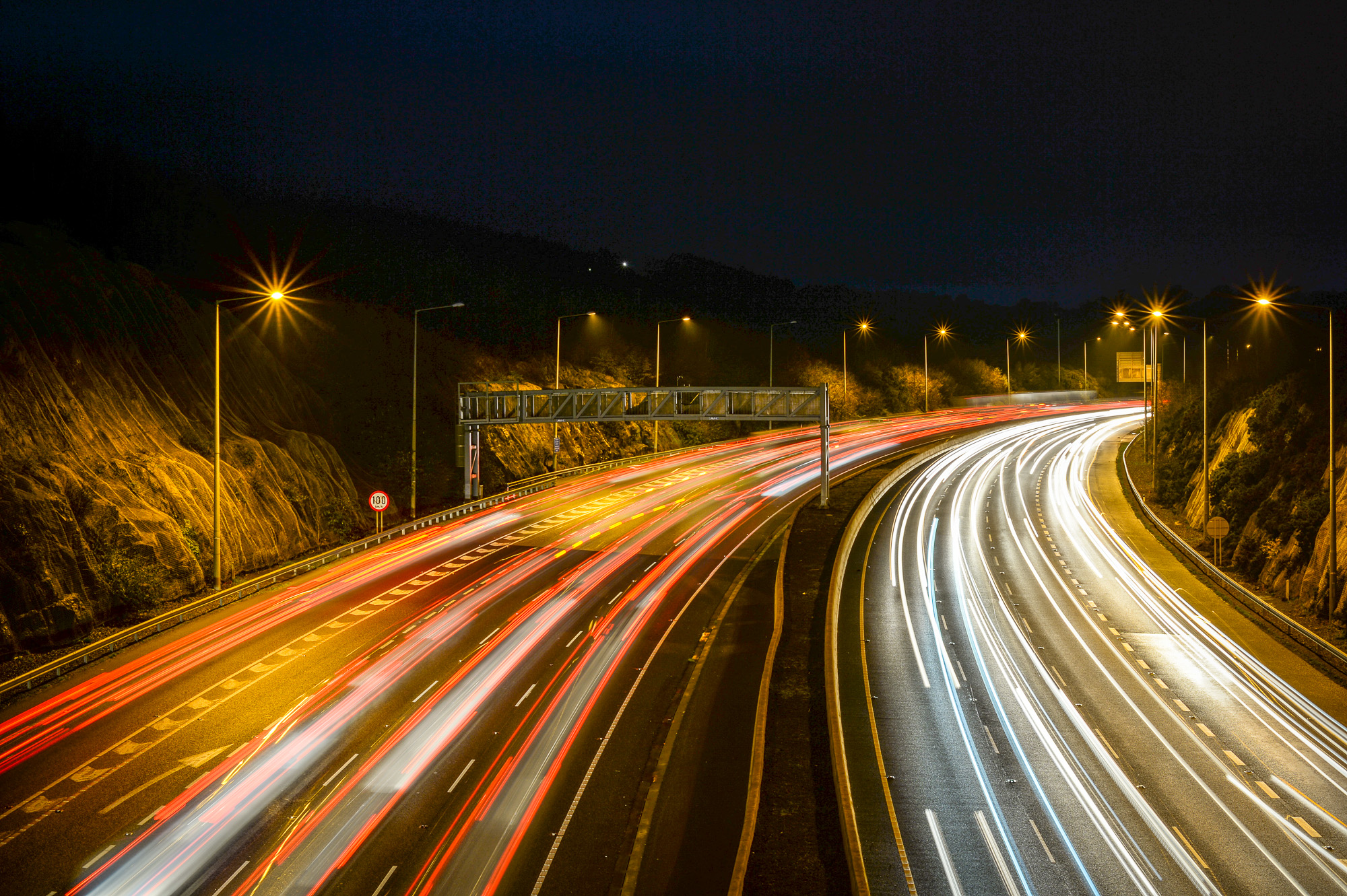
M50 Dundrum exit at evening rush hour.

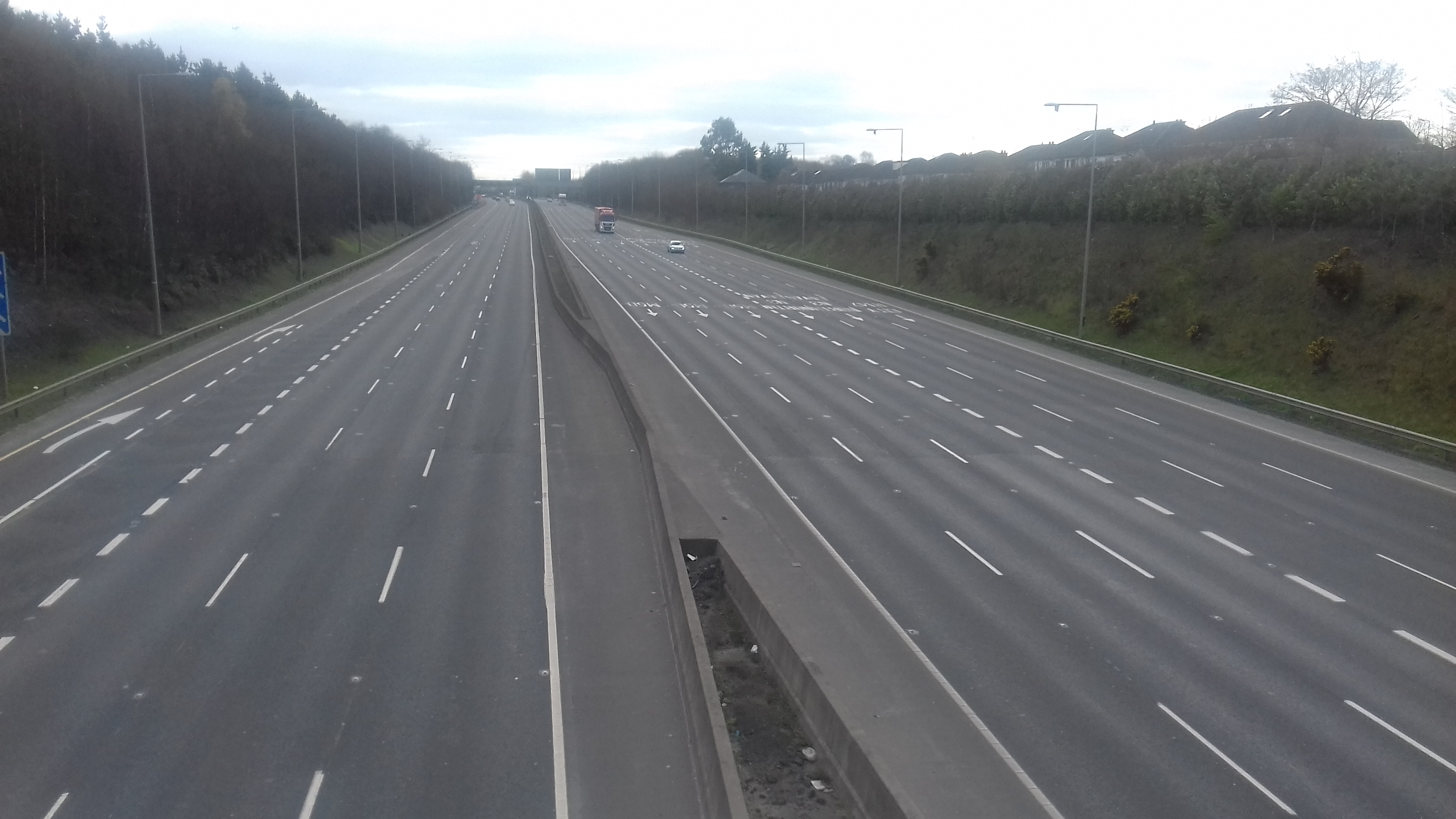
Looking south near J6 at Castleknock: COVID-19 lower traffic volumes

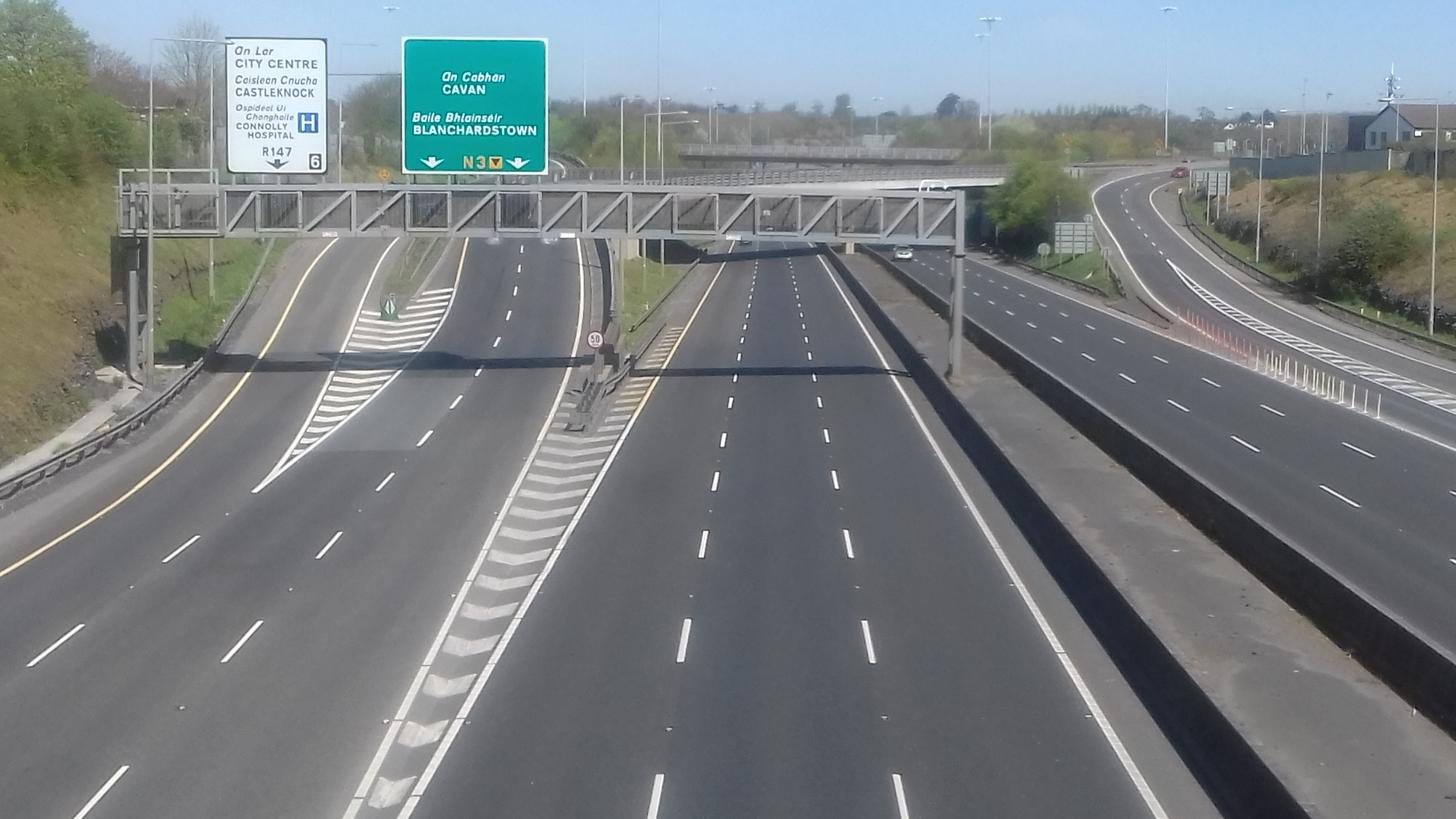
Looking north near J6 at Castleknock: COVID-19 lower traffic volume

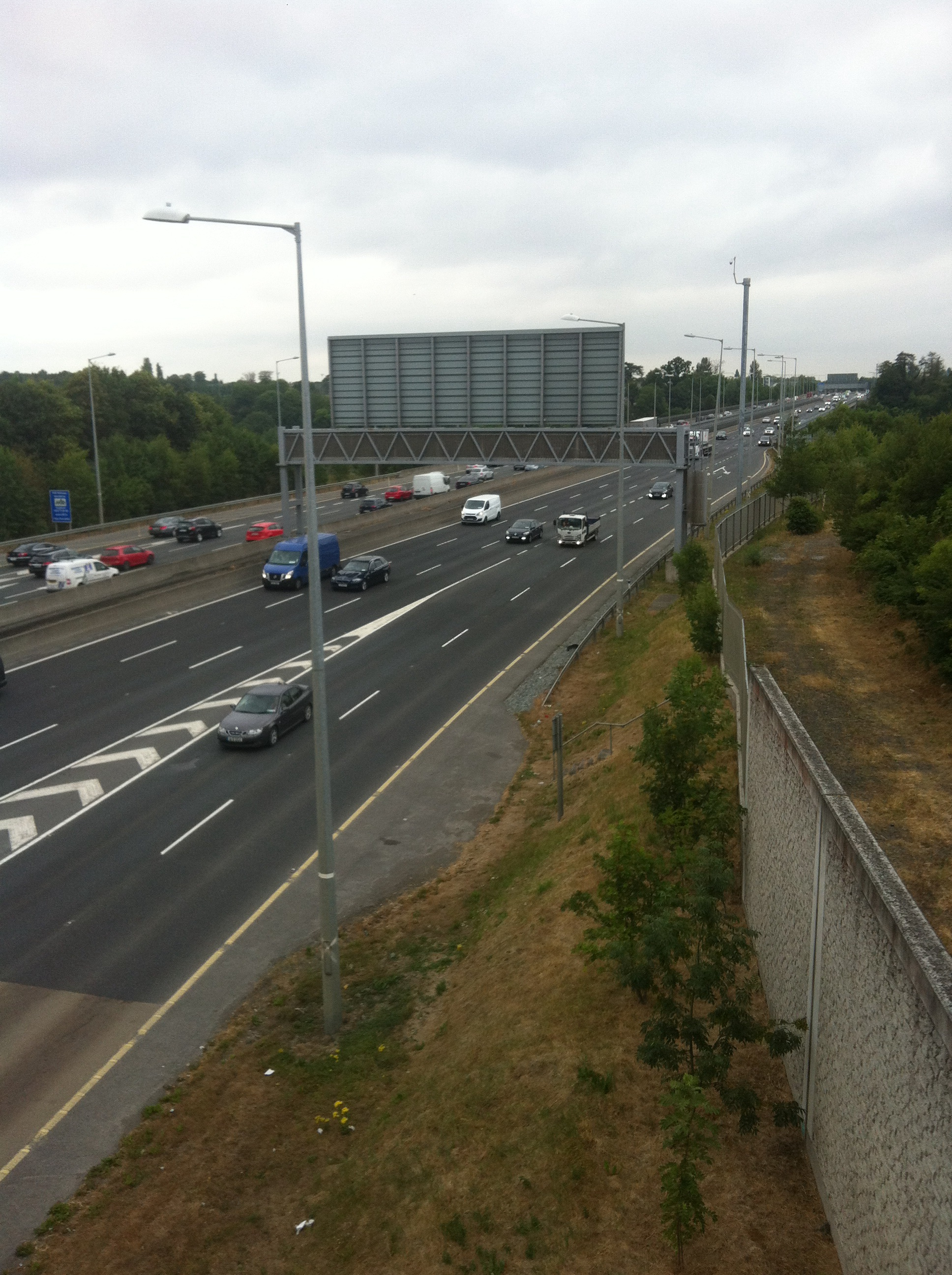
M50 and the West-Link Bridge viewed from Palmerstown.

km	mi	Junction	Destinations	Notes
0	0	1	Dublin Port	End of motorway, continues as R131.
0.5	0.3	Dublin Port Tunnel Toll		
5.5	3.4	2	R104 – Coolock, Santry, Beaumont Hospital	Exit number is not signposted. Northbound entrance and southbound exits only.
6	3.7	2	R132 – City centre	Exit number is not signposted. Northbound entrance and southbound exits only.
7	4.3	3	M1 – Belfast, Dublin Airport R139 – Malahide	
9	5.6	4	R108 – Ballymun, Naul	City centre
12	7.5	5	N2 – Derry, Ashbourne R135 – Finglas	City centre
16.5	10.2	6	N3 – Cavan, Blanchardstown R147 – Castleknock	City centre, Connolly Hospital
19	11.8	West-Link Toll		
20	12.4	7	N4 – Galway, Westport, Sligo R148 – Palmerstown	City centre
24.5	15.2	9	N7 – Limerick, Cork, Waterford R110 – Inchicore	City centre
26	16.1	10	R838 – Ballymount, Cookstown, Belgard Road	Ballymount Industrial Estate
28.5	17.7	11	N81 – Tallaght R137 – Templeogue	Blessington
30	18.6	12	R113 – Firhouse, Knocklyon	Scholarstown, Ballyboden
35.5	22	13	R826 – Sandyford, Dundrum	Ballinteer, Rathfarnham
37.5	23.3	14	N31 – Dún Laoghaire, Stillorgan	Southbound exit only.
41	25.5	15	Carrickmines, Kilternan	Cornelscourt, Leopardstown, Ballyogan, Carrickmines Park and Ride
43.5	27	16	R118 – Cherrywood, Loughlinstown	Shankill, Killiney
45.5	28.3	17	N11 – City centre, Dún Laoghaire	Northbound exit and southbound entrance only. Continues as M11.
1.000 mi = 1.609 km; 1.000 km = 0.621 mi: Incomplete access; Tolled

The South Eastern Motorway section, a radial route, was originally meant to be part of the M11. It curves away from the city centre and instead joins the N11 at junction 17 heading south. The next opportunity to exit the motorway is at the Bray North exit 5 of the M11.

There is no Junction 8, the junction number having been reserved for a potential extension of the M7 motorway from Lucan/Clondalkin to Naas. This is unlikely to be built given that the N7 Naas Road has been upgraded to dual three-lane with at-grade junctions converted to grade-separated interchanges or left-in, left-out (LILOs) junctions. However, it is an objective of South Dublin County Council to construct a new junction and use it to provide local access to the Cloverhill area of Palmerstown. This is also very unlikely to happen as the NRA have stated they are against the provision of new interchanges on the existing M50 as they are seen to contribute to traffic congestion on the route and undermine its function as a motorway.

== Future plans ==
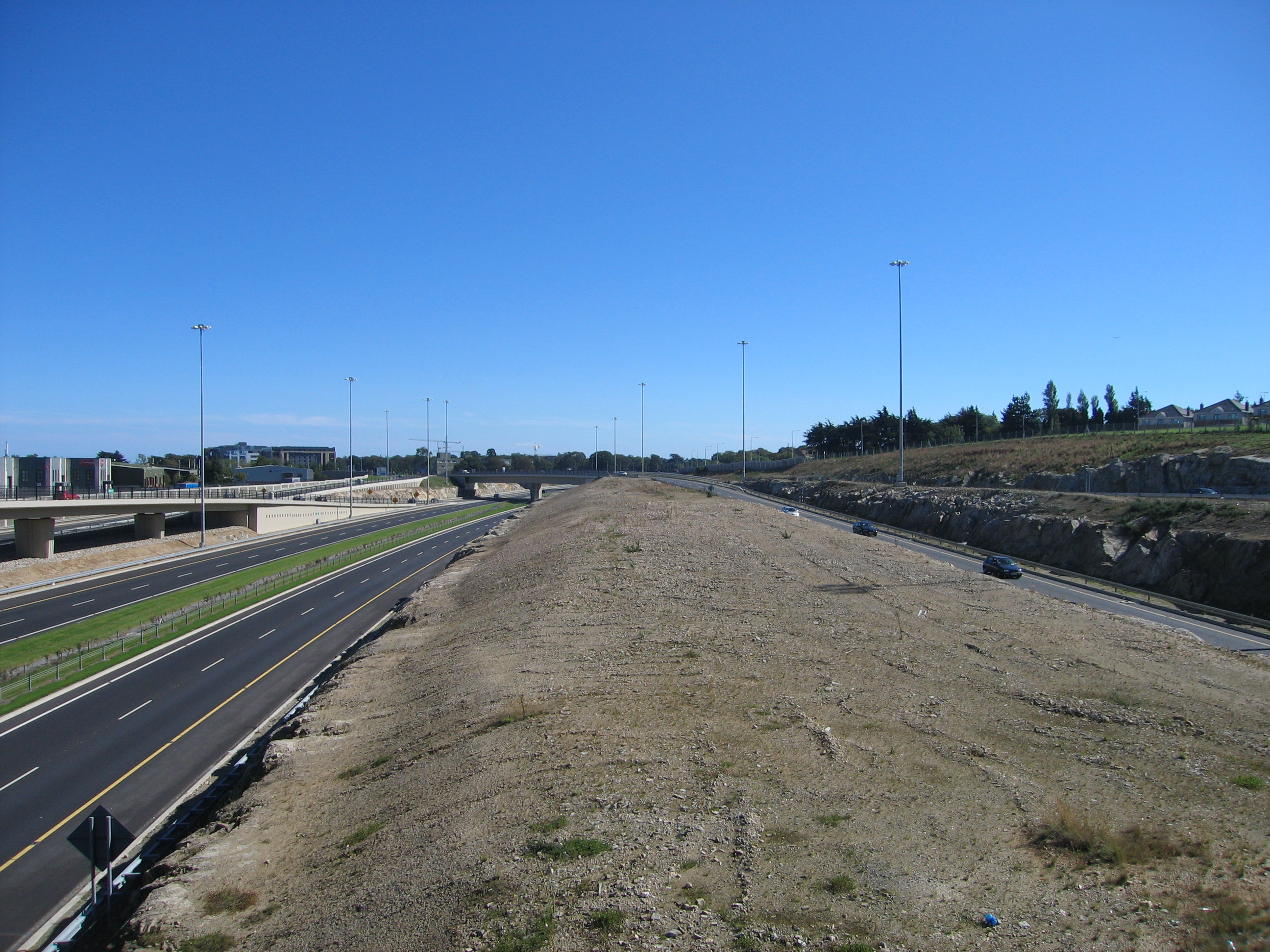
M50 J13/J14 overlap

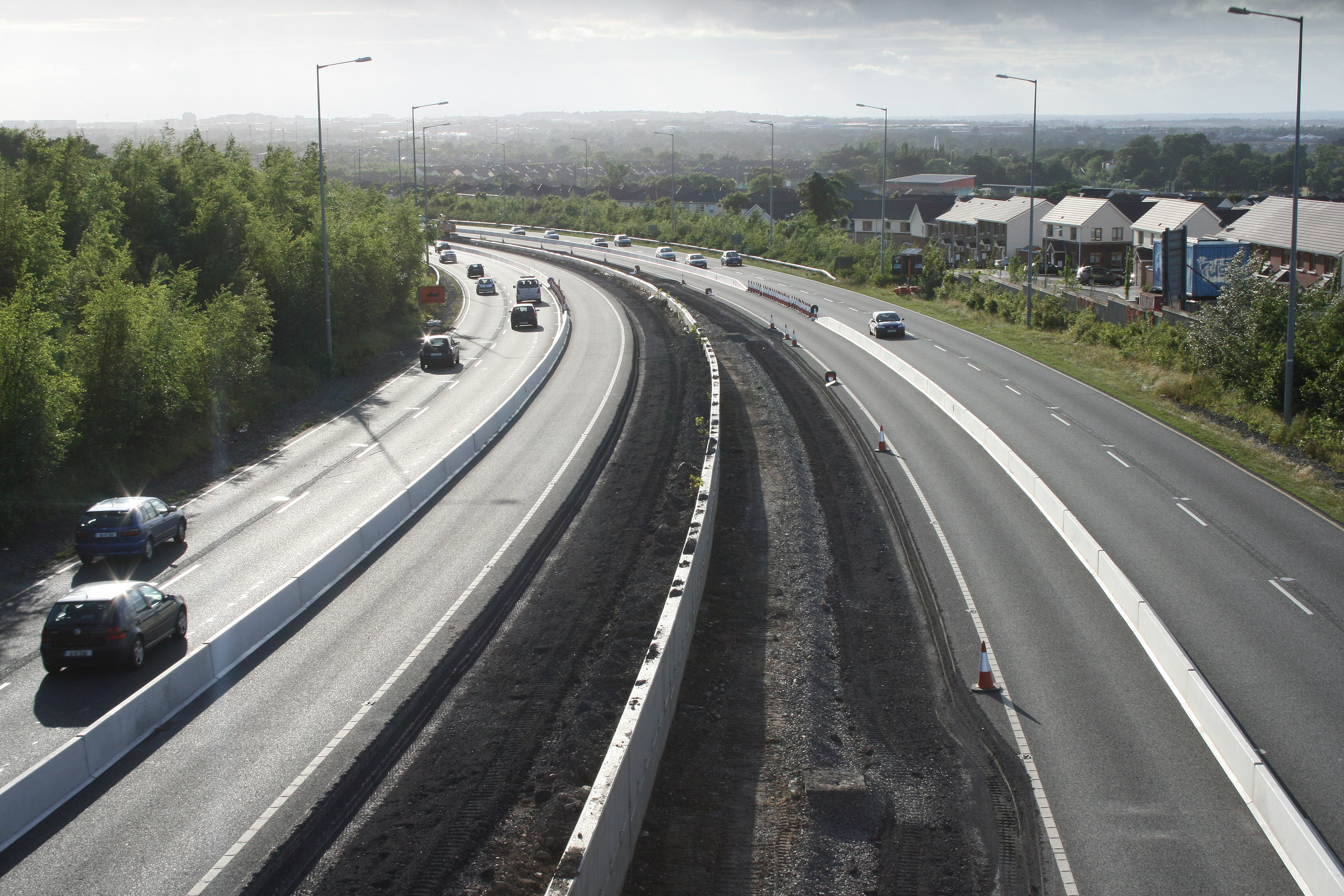
M50 widening (Southern Cross section between J12 and J13), looking west (northbound) in June 2008

Completion of Dublin's ring road by the building of an Eastern Bypass of the city has been proposed. This plan is controversial, as it would require a tunnel across Sandymount Strand to or possibly through Booterstown marsh bird sanctuary. A motorway reservation from Sandyford to Booterstown was included in the Dún Laoghaire–Rathdown Development Plan, with space allowed for an interchange where it crosses the N11. The Dublin Port Tunnel, which opened on 20 December 2006, would form the northern half of the Eastern bypass. This project was cancelled in 2009.

Another outer orbital road has been proposed for the Dublin region. It will, if approved, run approximately from Drogheda via Navan, Trim and Kilcock towards Naas.

== See also ==
- M50 Roma encampment
- N40
- Roads in Ireland
- Motorways in Ireland
- National secondary road
- Regional road
- European route E01
