= Joseph Frost Edger =

British businessman

Joseph Frost Edger was a British leading merchant in China and Hong Kong. He was one of the first Unofficial Member of the Legislative Council of Hong Kong.

In 1843, J. F. Edger was admitted as the resident partner of the Jamieson, How & Co., one of the leading merchant houses in Hong Kong at the time. In 1849, Governor George Bonham proposed to Earl Grey, the Secretary of State, to give the local merchants the right to nominate two representatives to the Legislative Council. J. F. Edger and David Jardine were nominated by the unofficial Justices of the Peace. In June 1850, Edger and Jardine were sworn in, being the first unofficial members of the Legislative Council.

Legislative Council of Hong Kong
New seat	Unofficial Member; 1850–1857; With: David Jardine (1850–1856); Joseph Jardine (1857)	Succeeded by George Lyall
