= Richard Rowett (businessman) =

Richard Rowett was a British businessman and member of the Legislative Council of Hong Kong.

Rowett was part of the Holiday, Wise & Co., a British opium firm. He was appointed member of the Legislative Council of Hong Kong in August 1869 during the absence of Henry John Ball, Judge of the Court of the Summary Jurisdiction sat as an unofficial. He was appointed again to replace Hugh Bold Gibb on 22 May 1871 who resigned from the Legislative Council. He retired from the Holiday, Wise & Co. on 31 December 1874.

Legislative Council of Hong Kong
Preceded by Henry John Ball	Unofficial Member; 1869–1870	Succeeded by Henry John Ball
Preceded by Hugh Bold Gibb	Unofficial Member; 1871–1872	Succeeded by Henry Lowcock
Preceded by Henry Lowcock	Unofficial Member; 1873–1875	Succeeded by Henry Lowcock
Business positions
Preceded by Henry Beverley Lemann	Chairman of the Hongkong and Shanghai Banking Corporation; 1871–1872	Succeeded by Thomas Ryke
