= Outer Orbital Route =

Proposed Outer Bypass of Dublin, Ireland

The Outer Orbital Route is a proposed motorway around the city of Dublin, Ireland; the route has also been known as the Leinster Outer Orbital Route and the Dublin Outer Orbital Route (DOOR). In 2008, the Government reaffirmed its support for the route, with construction to happen between 2011 and 2019. In 2015, work on the route has been deferred to 'after 2035'.

The motorway is to serve as a second bypass of the city to complement the M50 (inner orbital) motorway. and to link all of Dublin's main trunk routes: M1, M2, M3, M4, and M7. The only route that is not to be served is the M11. The road is planned to run roughly from south of Drogheda then south of Navan, then by Enfield, to east of Newbridge at the confluence of the M7 and M9 motorways.

== Funding ==
Although funding for transportation projects in Dublin was already difficult to secure, in 2008 the government reaffirmed its commitment to this project. In October 2015, the draft Greater Dublin Area Transport Strategy deferred plans for the road to after 2035.

== Potential Impact on Archaeological Sites ==
The land for the motorway is reserved by Meath County Council development plan (2011). The Tara Skryne Preservation group say that this will repeat the mistakes of the M3 development, by locking in a route which is too close to the Tara archaeological landscape and the Newgrange UNESCO World Heritage site

== See also ==
- Roads in Ireland
- Motorways in Ireland
- National primary road
- National secondary road
- Regional road
