= Alexander Perceval (merchant) =

British merchant and politician in Hong Kong

Chairman of the Hong Kong General Chamber of Commerce
- In office 1861–1862

Personal details
- Born: 1821
- Died: 8 May 1866 (aged 44) Temple House, County Sligo, Ireland
- Parent: Alexander Perceval (father)

Alexander Perceval (1821 – 8 May 1866), sometimes spelt "Percival", was a British merchant. He was the third son of the late Colonel Alexander Perceval, Member of Parliament for County Sligo, and subsequently serjeant-at-arms to the House of Lords. His mother was Jane Anne, daughter of Colonel L'Estrange, of Moystown, Moystown, Cloghan, King's County, Ireland.

== Biography ==
Born in 1821, Perceval was a relative of Mary Jane Perceval, the wife of James Matheson, one of the founders of Hong Kong trading house Jardine, Matheson & Co. As a result, in 1850 he became a clerk in the firm and became a partner in 1853. By 1862 he had become Taipan of Jardine's and an unofficial member of the Legislative Council of the colony of Hong Kong from 1860 to 1864. He was also the first chairman of the Hong Kong General Chamber of Commerce.

Having amassed a large fortune in the Far East, Perceval returned to Ireland in 1860, and purchased the paternal estate of Temple House from R. H. Hall-Dare, esq., of Newtonbarry, County Wexford, to whom it had been sold by Philip Perceval, esq., in 1857. He died at Temple House, County Sligo, aged 44.

== Offspring ==
Perceval's nineteen-month-old son Robert Jardine Percival died in May 1852 and is buried in a large chest tomb in the Hong Kong Cemetery.

== Legacy ==
Percival Street (sic) on Hong Kong Island is named after him.

Legislative Council of Hong Kong
Preceded by Joseph Jardine	Unofficial Member; 1860–1864; With: John Dent (1860–1861); Angus Fletcher (1860–1862); Francis Chomley (1861–1864); Charles Wilson Murray (1862–1864)	Succeeded by James Whittall
Preceded by George Lyall	Senior Unofficial Member; 1861–1864	Succeeded by Francis Chomley
Business positions
New creation	Chairman of the Hong Kong General Chamber of Commerce; 1861–1862	Succeeded by James Macandrew
