= Motorways in the Republic of Ireland =

A map of Ireland's national road network

In Ireland, the highest category of road is a motorway (mótarbhealach, plural: mótarbhealaí), indicated by the prefix M followed by a one- or two-digit number (the number of the national route of which each motorway forms a part). The motorway network consists entirely of motorway-grade dual carriageways and is largely focused upon Dublin. There are several three-lane motorways. Ireland's busiest road, the M50, incorporates four-lane, five-lane, and six-lane stretches.

The completion of the Major Inter-Urban Motorway Project in December 2010, connected Dublin to the cities of Cork, Limerick, Waterford and Galway by continuous motorway, as well as a number of other projects, increased Ireland's motorway network to 916 km. Planned new road construction will possibly lead to almost 1,100 km of motorway by 2035, subject to the availability of funding.

== Features ==
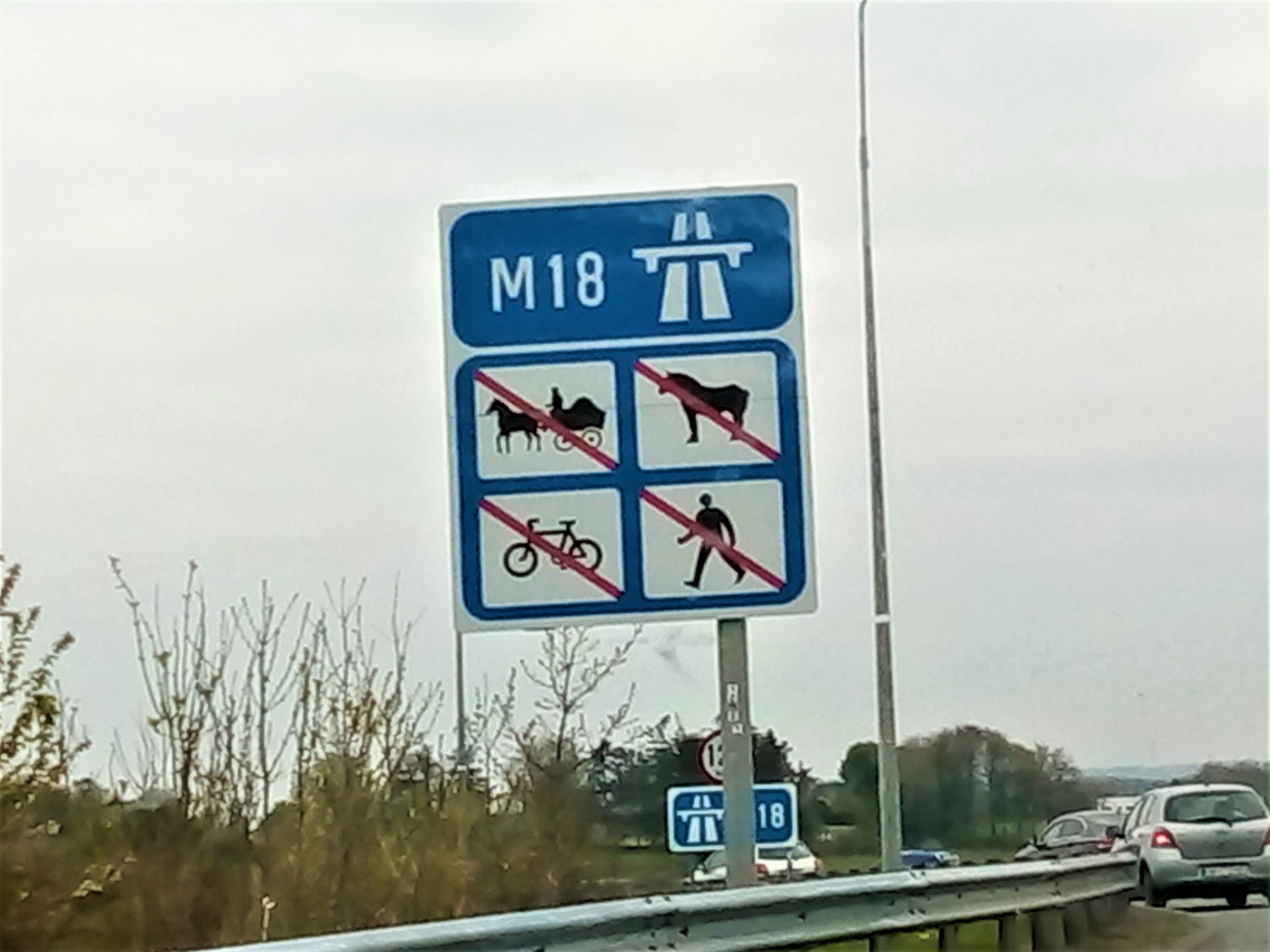
A sign on the M18 warning that horses, horse-drawn vehicles, pedestrians and bicycles are forbidden.

=== Regulations ===
Motorways in Ireland have a set of restrictions, which prohibit certain traffic from using the road. The following classes of traffic are not allowed on Irish motorways:

- Learner drivers
- Slow vehicles (i.e. not capable of reaching 50 km/h (30 mph) on a level road)
- Invalid carriages (lightweight three-wheeled vehicles)
- Pedestrians
- Pedal-cycles (bicycles, etc.)
- Vehicles under 50cc (e.g. mopeds)
- Vehicles without pneumatic tyres
- Animals

Rules for driving on motorways include the following:

- The keep-left rule applies unless overtaking
- No stopping at any time
- No reversing
- No hitchhiking
- Only vehicles that can travel faster than 90 km/h (55 mph) may use the outside lane
- No driving on the hard-shoulder

The general motorway speed limit is 120 km/h (75 mph).

=== Specification ===
Motorways in Ireland are generally constructed to high-quality dual carriageway standard – with sightlines, curves and elevation designed for 120 km/h speeds. Until recently, all motorways were built with wide medians in the centre, which typically have a wire or steel barrier with a continuous hedge growing and covering it over time. The more recent schemes have narrow medians, only 3 metres in width, with a concrete barrier in the middle.

These narrow-median schemes have reduced carriageway width – a typical narrow-median motorway cross section has two 3.5-metre running lanes, a 2.5-metre hard shoulder and a 1.5-metre central reserve in each direction. A typical wide median motorway has 3.75-metre running lanes and a 3-metre hard shoulder.

Ireland has only a small amount of D3M, a motorway with three lanes in each direction. The M50 is the most notable example, upgraded in parts from a two-lane motorway, to a three or four lane motorway in each direction.

Apart from terminal junctions, motorways can only be accessed using grade-separated junctions. These typically take the form of roundabout interchanges for higher-capacity junctions, or dumbbell interchanges – which are a variant on the diamond-style interchange – for lower-trafficked interchanges. Other types of junction are also used on the motorway network. The M4/M6 and M7/M9 junctions use a variant of the fork style interchange. The M9/N10 junction in County Kilkenny and N40/N28 junction in Cork City are trumpet-style interchanges. The M50/N7 and M50/N4 interchanges use partial cloverleaf junctions.

=== Safety ===
Motorways in Ireland include several safety features not found on other classes of road. The most notable include the presence of a continuous hard-shoulder, use of crash barriers, superior lighting and provision of emergency phones at regular intervals. Some motorway schemes include deflectors to provide protection at interchanges.

=== Signage ===
Motorway signage in Ireland is blue, and is similar in design to UK signage. Signs for on-line service areas are blue. Those for off-line service areas are brown. Route numbers use the Motorway typeface. All other text uses the Transport Heavy typeface, with Irish text being rendered in a unique oblique variation.

Signs featuring the motorway number and motorway symbol are positioned at the entrances to motorways, generally on both sides of the slip road. When approaching a junction that leads to a motorway, signs indicating motorway restrictions may be placed in advance.

=== Route number inheritance ===
In Ireland all motorways form part of a national route. The M50 was the only motorway that initially did not form part of an existing national primary route, though it was designated as the national primary route N50 in 1994.

In most cases, motorways were built to by-pass a road forming the national road. For example, the M7 by-passes roads previously forming the N7. The by-passed roads are then generally reclassified as regional roads. Motorways are sections of roads with special regulations, and they are signposted with the M prefix to indicate that they are under motorway regulations.

== Present network ==
The following table shows a list of motorways currently open in Ireland.

Route	Motorway section	Destinations	Toll
M1 motorway	M50 to north of Dundalk.	Dublin – Belfast	J7 – J10
M2 motorway	Killshane to north of Ashbourne.	Dublin – Derry	-
M3 motorway	Clonee to north of Kells.	Dublin – Ballyshannon	J5 – J6, J9 – J10
M4 motorway	Lucan to Coralstown, Mullingar	Dublin – Sligo	J8 – J11
M6 motorway	M4 Junction 11 (Kinnegad) to east of Athlone; west of Athlone to Galway	Dublin – Galway	J15 – J16
M7 motorway	Naas to Limerick.	Dublin – Limerick	J18 – J21
M8 motorway	M7 Junction 19 (c. 15 km south-west of Portlaoise) to Cork.	Dublin – Cork	J1 – J3, J14 – J17
M9 motorway	M7 Junction 11 (c. 8 km south-west of Naas) to Quarry roundabout, Grannagh, Co. Waterford	Dublin – Waterford	-
M11 motorway	Shankill/Bray Bypass; Ashford to north of Oylegate.	Dublin – Wexford	-
M17 motorway	East of Galway to south of Tuam	Galway – Sligo	-
M18 motorway	Shannon, County Clare to east of Galway.	Limerick – Ennis – Galway	J2 - J4 (N18)
M20 motorway	Outskirts of Limerick City to Patrickswell, (Remainder to Cork Planned)	Cork – Limerick	-
M50 motorway	Dublin Port to Shankill	Dublin ring road	J1 – J2, J6 – J7

== History ==
=== 1983–1989 ===
In 1983, the first sections of Irish motorway were opened: a short section of M7 bypassing Naas and the first stretch of M1, all of which has now been redesignated M50. In 1985, the M1 was extended to Dublin Airport.

=== 1990–1999 ===
Ireland's motorway network began to expand significantly between 1990 and 1999. The first of the projects completed in this period was the western section of the M50, linking the N7, N4 and N3 together in 1990. This was quickly followed by the M11 Bray/Shankill bypass in 1991. After this there followed a lull in construction after what had been a busy few years in motorway construction by then Irish road building standards. 1993 saw an extension to the M7, continuing from the Naas Bypass and providing a bypass of the town of Newbridge, and the M9 Kilcullen spur. Another small section of M1, a bypass of Dunleer in County Louth was opened.

In 1994, the Leixlip to Kilcock motorway was completed, forming part of the M4. In 1995, no new motorways were opened. In 1996, the northern section of the M50 was opened, linking the existing motorway to the N2 and M1. In 1997, the Portlaoise bypass opened as M7, and, like the M1 Dunleer bypass, seemed very isolated compared to the rest of the network which was concentrated around Dublin. 1998 saw the opening of another short piece of M1, this time to the south of Balbriggan, modern day junctions 5 and 7. In 1999, there were no new sections of motorway opened.

=== 2000–2010 ===
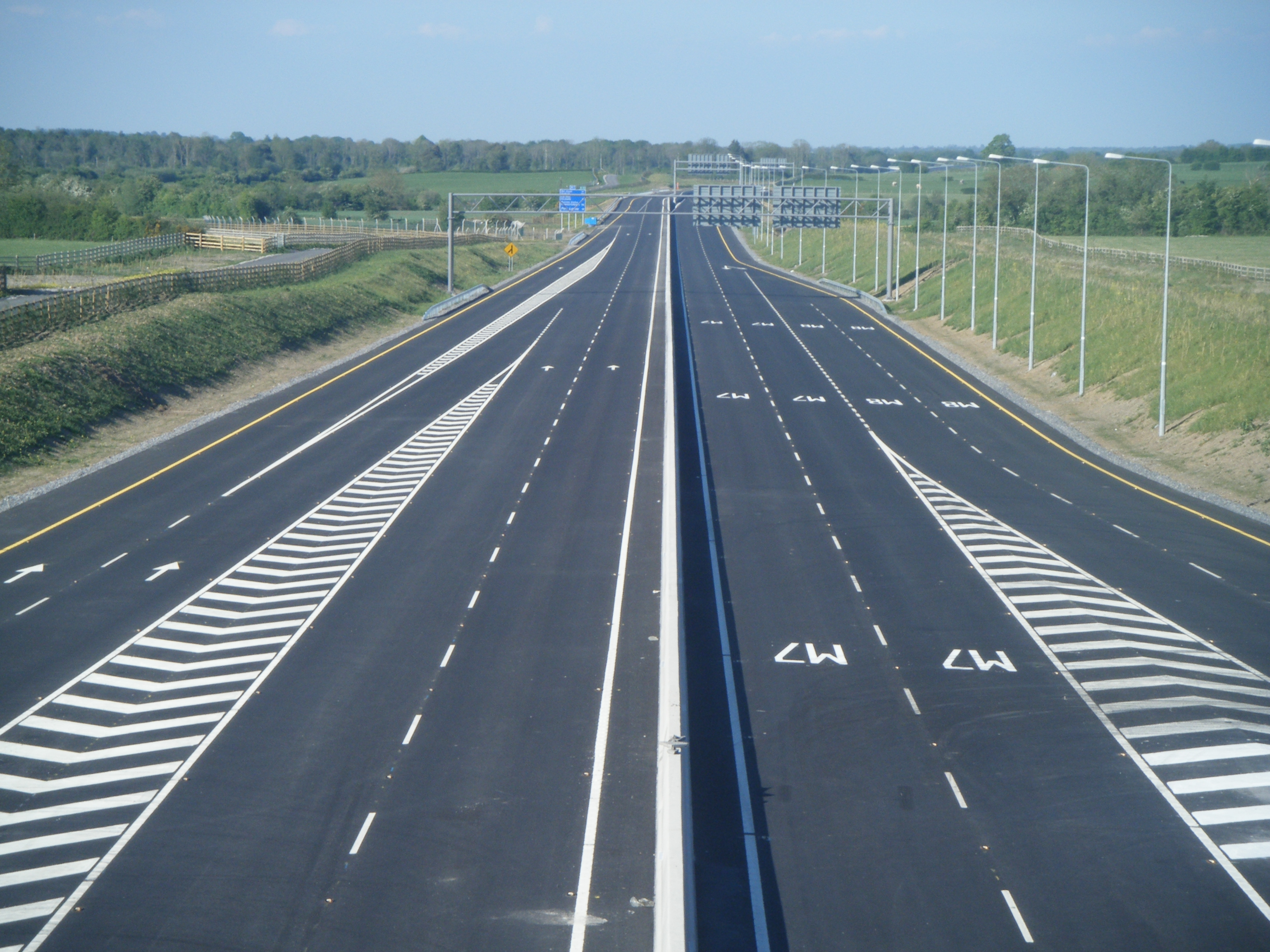
This section of the M7/M8 motorways opened in May 2010, completing the M8 route and extending that of the M7.

The 2000s saw a major expansion in the construction of new motorways in Ireland, after an initially slow start. In 2000, no new motorways opened. In 2001, another section of the M1, extending the Dunleer bypass northwards to the south of Dundalk (junction 16), and the M50 Southern Cross Route were opened. In 2002, no new motorways opened.

In 2003, the sections of the M1 were joined, creating a continuous motorway from Dublin to just south of Dundalk. A huge part of this route was the Drogheda bypass which was tolled. Also in 2003, the M7 was extended westwards from Newbridge to also bypass Kildare, up to modern day junction 14. In 2004, it was extended further with the opening of the Monasterevin bypass to link up with the Portlaoise bypass. This meant there was now a continuous motorway from Naas to Portlaoise.

In 2005, the M4 was extended from Kilcock to Kinnegad, with a toll applied to it, one of the first PPP schemes to be tried out in Ireland. The M1 Dundalk bypass was also finished, meaning that there was now a full motorway link on the Dublin to Belfast route virtually as far as the border. In 2005, the M50 was extended to link up to the M11, providing a full western bypass of the capital.

In 2006, the M8 Fermoy to Watergrasshill motorway was opened, another section that was tolled. In 2006, a section of what would become M6 was completed, going westwards from the M4 at Kinnegad to Tyrrellspass. The road was opened as N6 and was the first section of road to be completed that would be affected by the Roads Act 2007 and motorway redesignation.

In 2007, the same road was extended by some 10 km (6 miles) to join with the N52 north of Tullamore, still opened as N6, as the first tranche of motorway redesignations had only just been submitted.

In 2008, a large section of the M8 opened, making it the longest motorway in Ireland. Stretching from Urlingford to just east of Mitchelstown, the motorway opened in sections, the first being the Cashel bypass, which opened in 2004, and which was followed by the Cashel to Mitchelstown section, both of which were open before the redesignation to motorway came into effect in September 2008. The Urlingford to Cashel section opened later on in the year and so became a motorway immediately. Also opened in 2008 was the M9 Carlow bypass which was also open to traffic before the redesignation came into effect. The M6 was extended to the Athlone bypass and Ireland's motorway network was greatly expanded.

2009 was another major milestone in the development of the Irish motorway network, with many projects under construction finished by the end of the year. Redesignation of High-Quality Dual-Carriageway sections of National Primary routes to motorway took effect on 28 August 2009, further expanding the network. On 18 December 2009 the M6 was opened (Dublin-Galway direct). It is 194 km (120 miles) of motorway. The M9 (linking Dublin to Carlow) was opened on Monday 21 December 2009 and was expanded in March 2010 to link Dublin to Waterford directly. The M9 was fully completed with the opening of the Carlow to Knocktopher section on 9 September 2010.

2010: M3: 61 km (38 miles) of motorway in County Meath opened on 4 June 2010.

M7: Nenagh – Limerick, 38 km (24 miles) long, opened in three stages, being fully opened on 28 September 2010.

M7: Limerick – Shannon motorway tunnel, 10 km (6 miles) long, opened ahead of schedule on 27 July 2010.

M7: Castletown – Nenagh, 36 km (22 miles) long, opened 22 December 2010.

M7/M8: Portlaoise – Castletown, Portlaoise to Cullahill, 40 km (25 miles), opened on 28 May 2010.

M9: Carlow – Knocktopher, 40 km (25 miles) long, opened 9 September 2010.

M9: Knocktopher – Waterford, 24 km (15 miles) long, opened 22 March 2010.

M50: improvements for Dublin, completed August 2010, but expected earlier.

M18: Crusheen and Gort, 22 km (14 miles), opened 12 November 2010.

==== Motorway redesignation (tranche 1) ====
The Roads Act 2007 was passed into law in mid-2007. This Act makes provision for the redesignation of suitable dual carriageways to motorway status. The National Roads Authority made formal applications under Section 8 of the Act to the Minister for Transport on 16 October 2007 regarding dual carriageways which the authority believed to be suitable for redesignation as motorways.

On 29 January 2008, the Department of Transport published notice of the Minister's intention to make the orders being sought and invited submissions or observations to be made to the Minister regarding the NRA's applications.

The consultation procession lasted until 28 March 2008. On 17 July 2008 the statutory instrument redesignating the roads as motorways was signed, and any open parts of these roads have officially become motorways as of 24 September 2008. The Carlow bypass and Kilbeggan-Athlone roads opened with motorway signage but with temporary 100 km/h (60 mph) general speed limits between their opening and their official re-designation as motorways.

The following sections were redesignated:

Route	Proposed motorway section	Destinations
N6 road	Kinnegad (M6 J2) – Athlone	(Dublin) – Galway
N7 road	South of Borris-in-Ossory to Annacotty	Dublin – Limerick
N8 road	Urlingford – Fermoy	(Dublin) – Cork
N9 road	Kilcullen – Powerstown	(Dublin) – Waterford

==== Motorway redesignation (tranche 2) ====
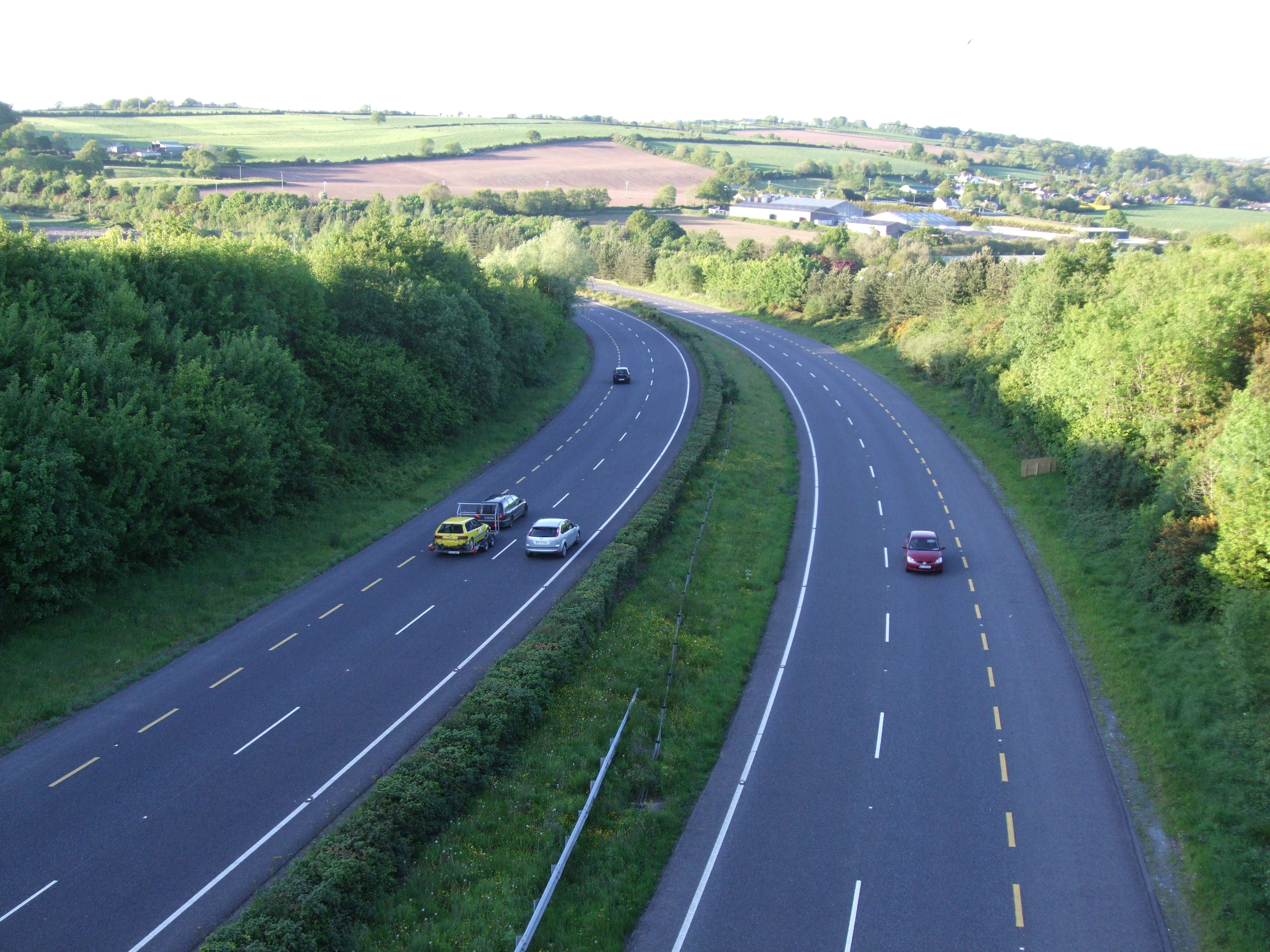
This section of the N8 5 km (3 miles) north of Cork City was redesignated as a motorway in August 2009.

In September 2008, the NRA announced its second tranche of proposed motorway redesignations. The closing date for submissions was November 2008. The Statutory Instrument reclassifying the roads as motorways was made in July 2009, taking effect from 28 August 2009.

The following schemes were included:

Route	Proposed motorway section	Destinations
N2 road	Junction 2 – north of Ashbourne	Dublin – Derry
N3 road	Mulhuddart – Dunboyne	Dublin – Ballyshannon
N4 road	Kinnegad – McNead's Bridge	Dublin – Sligo
N6 road	West of Athlone – Galway	(Dublin) – Galway
N7 road	Annacotty – Limerick	Dublin – Limerick
N8 road	Watergrasshill – Cork	(Dublin) – Cork
N11 road	Ashford – Rathnew and Arklow – Gorey	(Dublin) – Wexford
N18 road	Shannon – Ennis – Gort	Limerick – Galway
N20 road	Limerick – Patrickswell	Limerick – Cork

On the N6, the Athlone bypass was included in the proposed redesignations. The final order (the Roads Act 2007 (Declaration of Motorways) Order 2009) did not include this section. The section of the N9 road between Powerstown and Waterford, which had been proposed as part of the first tranche but not included in the final order, was included in this order.

==== Inter-urban motorways ====
Linking Dublin to regional cities. These motorways are:

- M1 – linking Dublin with Dundalk. A dual carriageway to link in with Northern Irish motorway network
- M6 (via M4) – linking Dublin with Galway. Opened December 2009. The first city to city motorway in Ireland
- M7 – linking Dublin with Limerick
- M8 – linking Dublin with Cork
- M9 – linking Dublin with Waterford. Completed September 2010.

All sections of these motorways were completed by the end of 2010. The completion of these schemes added more than 300 km (200 miles) of motorway to the network at the time.

=== 2015–present ===
==== Atlantic Corridor ====
Under the government's Transport 21 initiative, Letterkenny will be linked to Waterford and Cork with new high quality roads – collectively known as the "Atlantic Corridor". While it is anticipated much of this scheme will be constructed as either 2+2 dual carriageway or higher quality single-carriageway – a significant portion of it is expected to be constructed as motorway.

- The M20 scheme linking Cork with Limerick (the state's second and third largest urban areas), will provide a complete connection between the two cities. It will be approximately 90 km (56 miles) in length. Its construction was given the final go-ahead on 13 October 2017.
- The final M18 scheme connecting Gort to the M6 near Galway city opened ahead of schedule on 27 September 2017.
- The construction of the M17 was bundled with the final M18 component and also opened on 27 September 2017. The two motorways meet at Rathmorrissey Interchange, Co. Galway.

==== Other motorways ====
In July 2019, the M11 Enniscorthy bypass was opened. In November 2019, a scheme was completed to widen the M7 from two to three lanes in each direction from the beginning of the Naas bypass, at junction 9, to the M7/M9 merge near Newbridge, junction 11.

A motorway project, the Dublin Outer Orbital Route, may be progressed in the future. It is possible that a motorway will be built to the north of Cork City to link the existing N22, N20 and M8 routes: this route, if built, will most likely be designated as the N40. Other potential motorways include a possible extension of the M4 from Mullingar to Longford. The Galway City Outer Bypass which may be built as an extension to the M6.

The Cork to Ringaskiddy road improvement scheme, originally envisaged as dual-carriageway, will now proceed as a motorway, the M28, to be 10.5 km long, and scheduled for completion by 2028.

The planned Adare to Rathkeale dual carriageway, being progressed as part of the Limerick to Foynes improvement scheme, is proceeding as a motorway, the M21, to be 16.7 km in length, and expected to be completed by 2029.

==== Motorway service areas ====
This is a list of motorway service stations operating in Ireland.

Name	Operator	Road	Town	Notes
Castlebellingham services	Applegreen	M1	Castlebellingham	
Lusk services	Applegreen	M1	Lusk	
Enfield services	Applegreen	M4	Enfield	
Birdhill services	Applegreen	M7	Birdhill	
Paulstown services	Applegreen	M9	Paulstown	
Wicklow services	Applegreen	M11	Wicklow	
Athlone services	Circle K	M6	Athlone	
Manor Stone services	Circle K	M8	Laois	
Cashel services	Circle K	M8	Cashel	
Fermoy services	Circle K	M8	Fermoy	
Carlow services	Circle K	M9	Carlow	
Kilcullen services	Circle K	M9	Kilcullen	
Gorey services	Circle K	M11	Gorey	
Kinnegad Plaza	Supermac's	M4/M6	Kinnegad	
Galway Plaza	Supermac's	M6	Kiltualgh	
Barack Obama Plaza	Supermac's	M7	Moneygall	
Junction 14 Mayfield	Supermac's	M7	Monasterevin	
N17 Plaza	Supermac's	M17	Tuam	

TII is building a series of service areas across the motorway network to provide for safe rest areas. The first of these opened in September 2010 on the M1 at Lusk.

Tranche 4 Motorway Services were announced in 2016 and are proposed for the following locations:

- M3 – Dunshaughlin
- M6 – Oranmore (also accessible from M17/M18)
- M18 – Newmarket-on-Fergus

The following sites have also been proposed:

- M20 – Charleville
- M28 – TBD
- N69 – TBD

Originally, service areas were to be located at 12 locations. A An Bord Pleanála decision ruled that a service area to be located at Rathmorrissey at an M6 junction be removed from an adjacent scheme.

It is anticipated that service areas will be provided on both the M3 motorway and the proposed M20 and M28 motorways.

== See also ==
- Roads in Ireland
- List of motorways in Northern Ireland
- History of roads in Ireland
- National Roads Authority
- Evolution of motorway construction in European nations
- Latoon fairy bush, a tree that purportedly necessitated the shifting of the M18 to avoid its destruction
