= Patricia O'Brien =

Irish diplomat (born 1957)

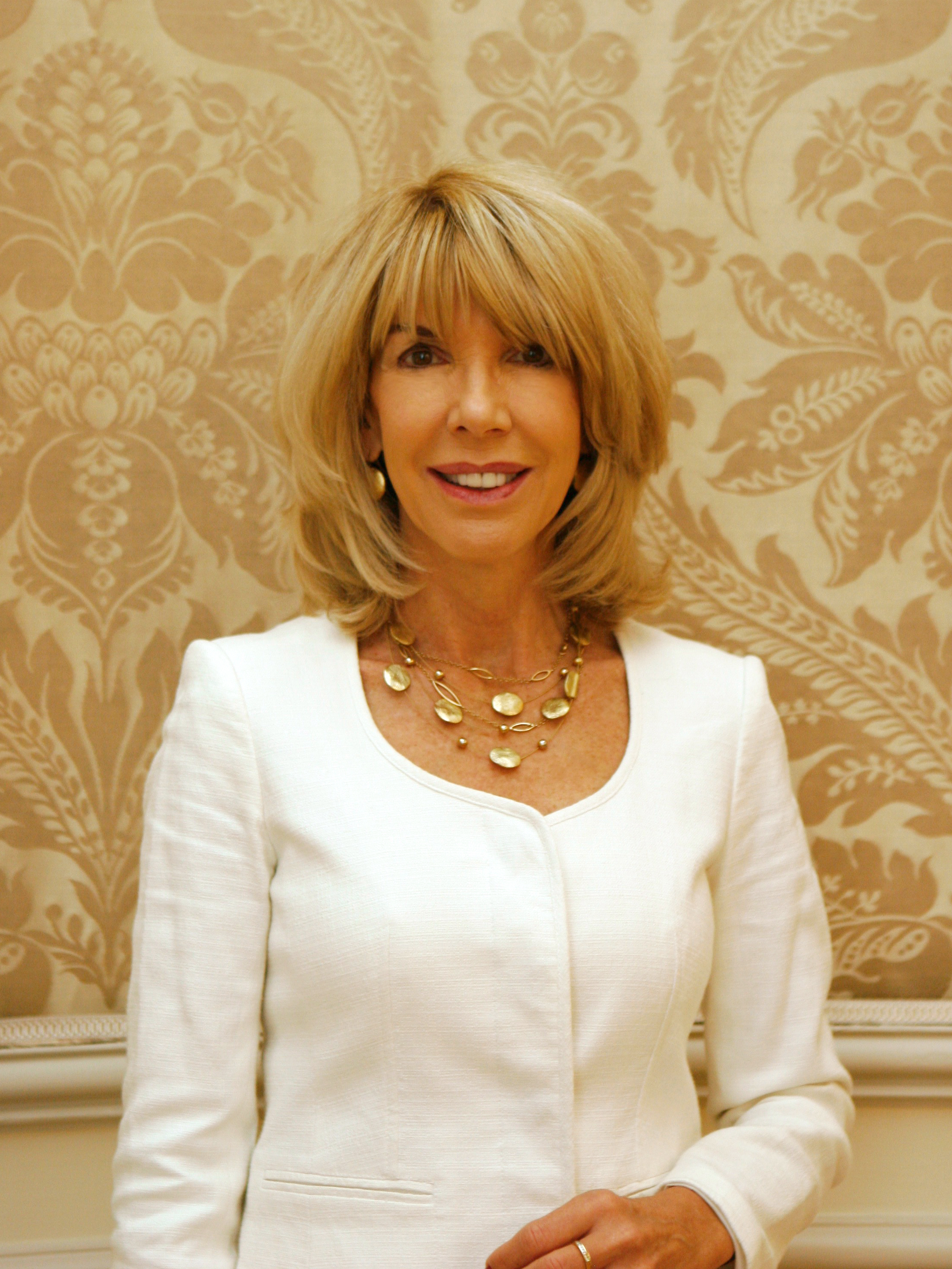
- O'Brien in 2019
- Born: February 8, 1957 (age 69); Brunei, British Borneo
- Occupation: Diplomat

Patricia O'Brien (born 8 February 1957) is Ambassador of Ireland to Italy. She served as Ambassador to France and to Monaco from 2017 to 2021. She had served from 2013 as the Permanent Representative (Ambassador) of Ireland to the United Nations and other international organization at Geneva.

From 2008 to 2013, she served as Legal Counsel and Under-Secretary-General for Legal Affairs at the United Nations, the first ever woman to hold that position. In this role, she led the United Nations Office of Legal Affairs. She was appointed by UN Secretary-General Ban Ki-moon in August 2008.

Prior to joining the UN, O'Brien served as Legal Adviser to the Department of Foreign Affairs in Ireland since 2003. Previously, she was a Senior Legal Adviser in the Office of the Attorney General of Ireland and Legal Counsellor at the Irish Permanent Representation to the European Union in Brussels.

O’Brien has three children.

== Early life ==
An Irish national, O'Brien was born in Brunei, British Borneo. She spent her childhood in Nigeria, Cambodia and the Congo, and Ireland, where she attended the boarding school, Our Lady's school, in Rathnew. Her father was a barrister who worked for the Red Cross and Shell International.

== Education and early career ==
O'Brien was a lawyer at the Irish Bar from 1979 to 1988. She spent one year at the Bar of British Columbia, Canada. Between 1989 and 1992, she taught at the University of British Columbia in Vancouver.

She obtained her Bachelor of Arts degree in legal science in 1978 and a Master of Arts degree in 1987, both from Trinity College Dublin. She has a Barrister-at-Law (BL) from King's Inns, Dublin (1978) and a Bachelor of Laws from the University of Ottawa in Canada (1990).

== Awards ==
In October 2017 she received the Woman Lawyer of the Year award from the Irish Women Lawyers Association.

She received an honorary doctorate from Trinity College Dublin in 2019.
