= Rathnew =

Village in County Wicklow, Ireland

Rathnew Irish: Ráth Naoi
- Village
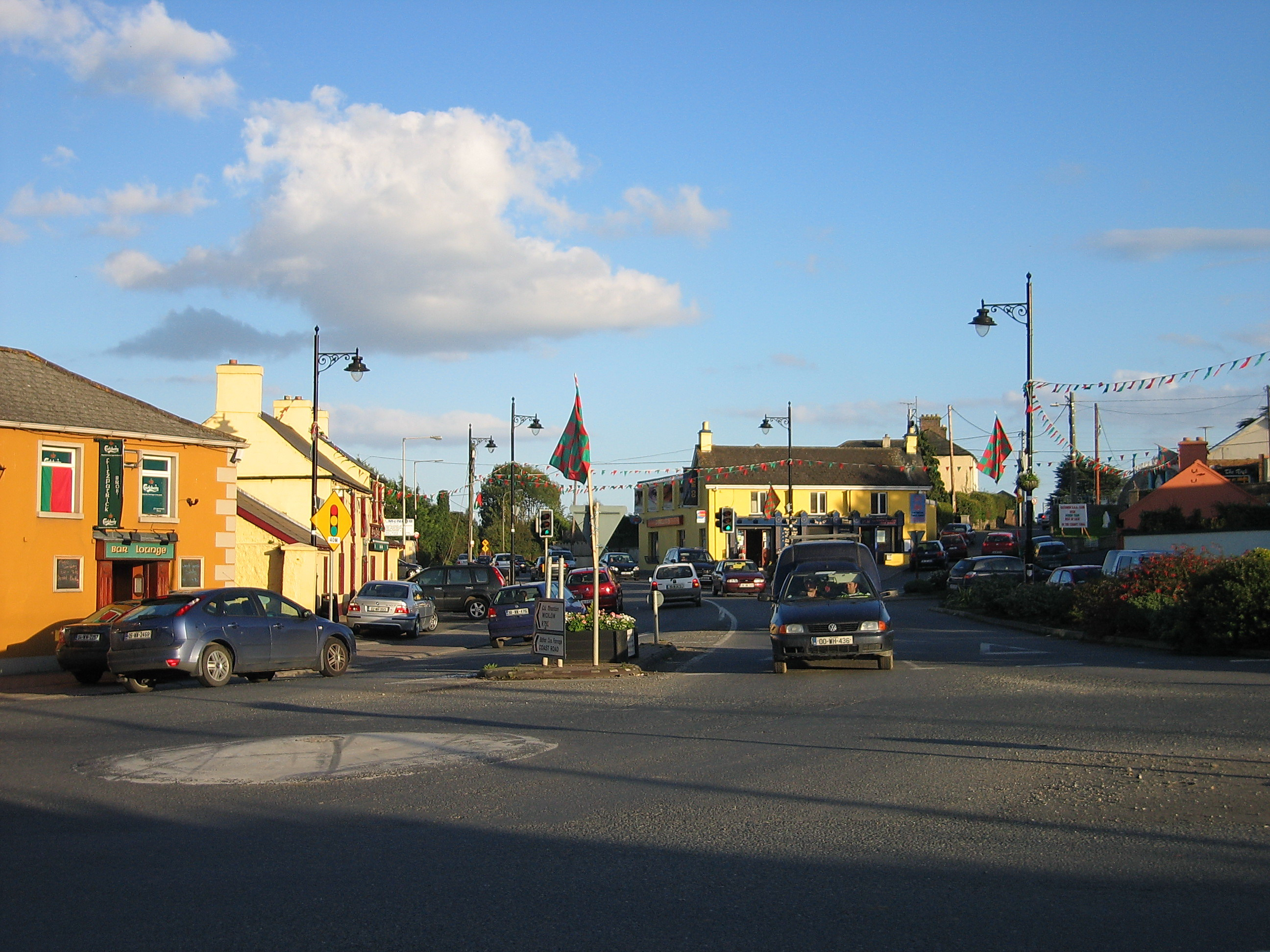
- Rathnew village centre

- Location in Ireland
- Coordinates: 52°59′26″N 6°05′07″W
- Country: Ireland
- Province: Leinster
- County: Wicklow
- Elevation: 71 m (233 ft)

Population (2022)
  - Total: 3,482
- Time zone: UTC+0 (WET)
  - Summer (DST): UTC-1 (IST (WEST))
- Irish Grid Reference: T285952

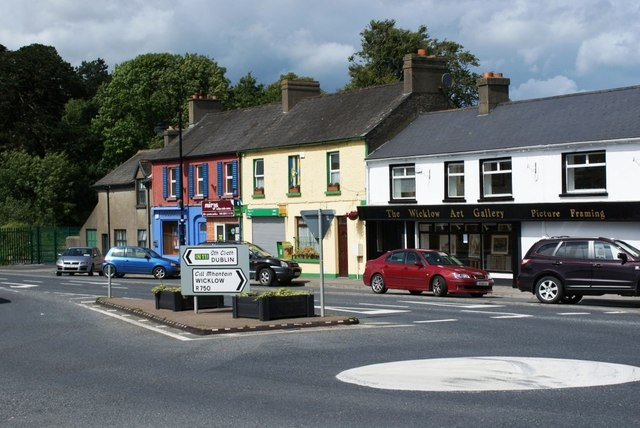
Shops by the roundabout on Main Street

Rathnew (Irish: Ráth Naoi, meaning 'ringfort of Naoi') is a village in County Wicklow, Ireland. Located south of the capital Dublin along the M11 between Dublin and Wexford, it is close to the county town of Wicklow, which is situated 3 km (1.9 mi) to the east. The village is in a civil parish of the same name.

== Education ==
Rathnew is home to Gaelscoil Chill Mhantáin, an Irish language primary school, which was established in 1996. The school was Ireland's first inter-denominational primary school, and draws pupils from Rathdrum, Brittas and Newcastle, as well as Rathnew.

Rathnew is also home to St Coen's National School, a co-educational national (primary) school which was formed following the amalgamation of a number of former/smaller schools in the area. As of 2019, it had over 270 pupils enrolled.

The local secondary school is Coláiste Chill Mhantáin, which opened in September 2011. Coláiste Chill Mhantáin is the amalgamation of two previous secondary schools based in Wicklow Town, Abbey Community College (now Educate Together Secondary School) and De La Salle.

Since late 2006 Clermont Convent, previously a private Secondary School for girls, has reopened on the same grounds as a Third Level College affiliated to the Institute of Technology, Carlow.

== Sport ==
The village's Gaelic football team has won the Wicklow Senior Provincial Championship more than 30 times, most recently in 2017.

Rathnew's soccer club was founded in 1958. For a time there the village had two soccer teams, Rathnew Ernans and Rathnew Celtic. Rathnew Celtic was the only team to ever go through the Leinster Junior Cup without conceding a goal in the 1978/1979 season. In 1986 both teams joined to make Rathnew A.F.C. a team which is still present today The club is based in Shamrock Park. Since late 2010, Rathnew A.F.C. has also played host to Rathnew Ladies A.F.C. soccer side, the first women's team in the history of the club, and which won the DWSL Shield in 2011.

== Tourism ==
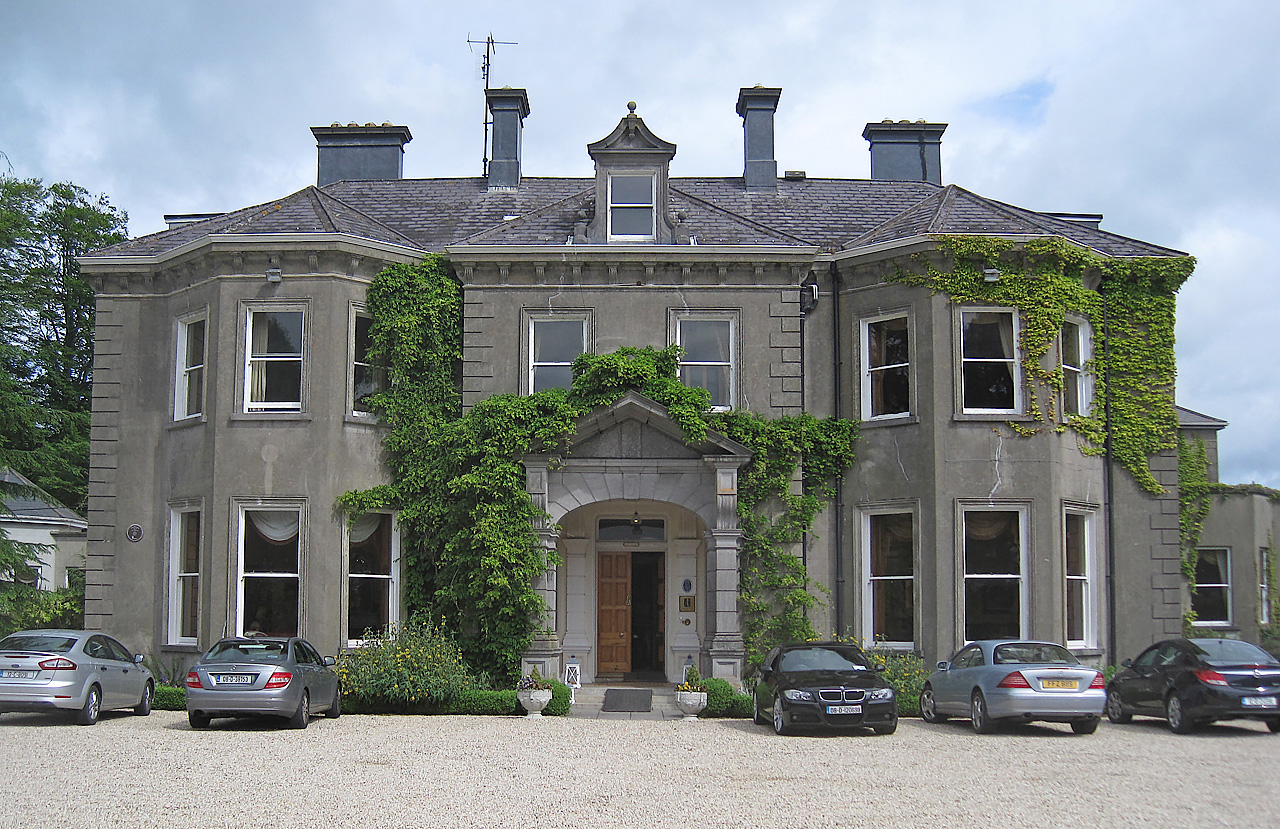
Front view of Tinakilly House

Rathnew is home to the historic Tinakilly House, the former residence of Capt. Robert Halpin and now a hotel. It is situated in the centre of the village opposite the local cemetery with a narrow entrance to a mile-long avenue. The building was first built in 1883 when it became Halpin's residence. The house overlooks the Irish Sea with a large garden surrounding it.

== Transport ==
Rathnew railway station opened on 1 September 1866, closed for goods traffic on 9 June 1947, and finally closed on 30 March 1964. For rail transport today, the closest station is Wicklow railway station, two miles inwards.

The local bus goes through the village every hour and stops outside the local primary school.

== Economy ==
The local postoffice is located at Merrymeeting Shopping Centre.

== Community Space ==
- Rathnew Women's Shed
- Rathnew Men's Shed

== People associated with Rathnew ==
- Susyn M. Andrews (b. 1953) - horticulturist
- Francis Chomley (1822–1892) - businessman
- Tom Cullen (1891–1926) Irish republican
- Johnny Doran (1908–1950) - uilleann piper
- Leighton Glynn (b. 1982) - Gaelic footballer
- Patricia O'Brien (b. 1957) - diplomat

== See also ==
- List of towns and villages in Ireland
