= Francis Chomley =

John Francis Chomley

Unofficial Member of the Legislative Council of Hong Kong
- In office 9 November 1861 – 26 April 1866
- Appointed by: Sir Hercules Robinson
- Preceded by: John Dent
- Succeeded by: John Dent

Chairman of the Hongkong & Shanghai Banking Corporation
- In office 2 March 1865 – January 1866
- Preceded by: New creation
- Succeeded by: John Dent

Personal details
- Born: 22 May 1822 Dublin, Ireland
- Died: 14 April 1892 (aged 69) Clermont, Rathnew, County Wicklow, Ireland
- Resting place: Wicklow Church of Ireland Churchyard
- Education: Trinity College, Dublin
- Occupation: Merchant

John Francis Chomley (22 May 1822 – 14 April 1892) was an Irish businessman in Hong Kong and China in the mid-19th century. He was the first chairman of the Hongkong and Shanghai Banking Company and member of the Legislative Council of Hong Kong.

== Early life and education ==
Chomley was the oldest son of Rev. Francis Chomley/Chamley (1784–1847), Rural Dean of County Wicklow and his first wife, Magdalene (Maud) Hanna (1790–1827). He entered Trinity College, Dublin in Trinity Term 1838 to study law. His interest in China was due to connections of his step mother's (Mary Elizabeth Chomley née Griffith) father, Richard Griffith M.P. of Millicent House, Clane, County Kildare, who had retired from trading in the East Indies and China in 1786, and other family members.

== Business career ==
Chomley went to the Far East and became the senior partner of the Dent & Co., one of the largest trading firms in the early colonial history of Hong Kong. Lancelot Dent, former senior partner of the Dent & Co. was arrested by the Qing government in Canton in 1839 on opium smuggling charges which helped triggering the First Opium War.

Chomley was also appointed to the Legislative Council of Hong Kong in 1861 on the resignation of John Dent, another partner of the Dent & Co. He was the Senior Unofficial Member from 1864 to 1866. He also acted as consul for the Kingdom of Sardinia during the absence of John Dent in 1861.

Chomley was one of the founding members of the provisional committee that launched the Hongkong and Shanghai Banking Company. He chaired the provisional committee's first meeting, held on 6 August 1864 and was elected the first chairman of board of the bank in 1865.

Dent & Co. went bankrupt in 1867 during the worldwide financial crisis which originated in 1866 in London. They suffered a loss of no less than £200,000 by the malversations of a Portuguese clerk in their employment at Shanghai, who was sentenced to seven years imprisonment. The petition for adjudication of bankruptcy was filed in the Supreme Court of Hong Kong on 29 June 1867. Chomley had to remove his headquarters in Shanghai and sold the Dent Building to the Hong Kong Hotel Co.

== Later life and death ==
Chomley retired to his home, Clermont, Rathnew, Wicklow County after serving as Her Britannic Majesty's Consul in Hong Kong 1868. He lived with his younger unmarried sister, Lucy (1825–1914) and died unmarried 14 April 1892. He is buried in Wicklow Church of Ireland Churchyard with a memorial plaque donated by his sister Lucy which reads "of Claremont, County Wicklow and Amoy, China".

His youngest half-brother, Charles Albert Chomley (1840–1862) had immigrated with his mother Mary and six brothers to Melbourne, and had returned to Ireland on the S.S. Great Britain in 1860. Charles (aged 21) had "learnt office", learning about the China trade with Sir James Turing in Rotterdam, and was travelling with Edward Turing (aged 19), youngest son of Sir James, when they were both accidentally drowned in the Lake Neuchâtel. Charles was to have joined his brother Francis in Hong Kong to participate in the China trade.

Legislative Council of Hong Kong
Preceded by John Dent	Unofficial Member; 1861–1866; With: Angus Fletcher (1861–1862); Alexander Perceval (1861–1864); Charles Wilson Murray (1862–1865); James Whittall (1864–1866); Thomas Sutherland (1865–1866)	Succeeded by John Dent
Preceded by Alexander Perceval	Senior Unofficial Member; 1864–1866	Succeeded by John Dent
Business positions
New title	Chairman of the Hongkong and Shanghai Banking Corporation; 1865–1866	Succeeded by John Dent
