= Racism in Romania =

Racism in Romania is directed against various minority groups, prominently Romani people, but there are also problems with antisemitism and other forms of discrimination. In particular, World War II and the subsequent era of communist rule both established hatred and xenophobic feelings which still influence contemporary Romanian discourse.

== Roma ==
Belonging to the lowest social classes, the Romani are caught in a vicious circle of poverty reinforced by segregation. Prejudice against Romani people is common among the Romanians, who stereotype the Romani as being thieves, dirty and lazy.

Violence against Romani is also common in Romania, especially in police brutality, such as cases of excessive force being not adequately investigated or sanctioned. Several anti-Romani riots occurred in the last decades, notable of which being the 1993 Hădăreni riots, in which a mob of Romanians and Hungarians, in response to the killing of a Romanian by a Romani, burnt down 13 houses belonging to the Romani, lynched three Romani people and forced 130 people to flee the village.

=== Discrimination ===
The Romani are discriminated on the access to healthcare, which leads to a generally poorer health status, the life expectancy of the Romani minority being 10 years lower than the Romanian average.

Within the Romanian education system there is discrimination and segregation, which leads to higher drop-out rates and lower qualifications for the Romani students.

=== Segregation ===
In Baia Mare, Mayor Cătălin Cherecheș built a 2-metre high, 100-metre long concrete wall to separate 3 buildings where the Romani community lives from a highly circulated road, arguing that this would bring "order and discipline" into the area. Part of the Romani community agrees with the decisions as it made a safer environment for their children and fewer car accidents.

=== History ===
In Wallachia and Moldavia, the Romani people were enslaved for centuries, belonging to the state, church or boyars (nobles) until slavery was gradually abolished during the 1840s and 1850s (see Slavery in Romania).

== Antisemitism ==
The presence of Jews in Romania is documented back to the 17th century. Since then the level of discrimination has varied. It increased sharply in the 1930s under the influence of the Iron Guard. Romania also organized death camps for Jews in the occupied Transnistria Governorate, such as the one at the Bogdanovka concentration camp, and the Romanian Army was involved in the 1941 Odessa massacre.

After World War II, most of those Jews who had survived emigrated to Israel. Prejudice continued under the Ion Iliescu government (2000–2004), although the desire to join the European Union led to a greater acknowledgement of past Romanian crimes, with Iliescu finally admitting to the genocide of Romanian Jews in 2004.
