= Charles Wilson Murray =

Scottish businessman and member of the Legislative Council of Hong Kong

Charles Wilson Murray (10 September 1820 – 15 August 1873) was a Scottish businessman and member of the Legislative Council of Hong Kong.

Murray was born in Edinburgh. He became the partner of the Bibery & Co. in 1859. He was subsequently appointed to the Legislative Council in March 1862. He resigned his seat in the Legislative Council in February 1865 on leaving Hong Kong and his vacancy was subsequently replaced by Thomas Sutherland. He died in Keswick, Cumberland, England, in 1873.

Legislative Council of Hong Kong
Preceded by Angus Fletcher	Unofficial Member; 1862–1865; With: Alexander Perceval (1862–1864); Francis Chomley (1862–1865); James Whittall (1864–1865)	Succeeded by Thomas Sutherland
