= George Lyall (merchant) =

British businessman (1821-1890)

George Lyall (12 February 1821 – 22 July 1890) was a British merchant and member of the Legislative Council of Hong Kong.

Lyall was born in Kennington, Surrey. He founded Lyall, Still & Co with Charles Fredrick Still in Hong Kong. He was appointed an unofficial member in Legislative Council in 1857. After Joseph Jardine retired in 1860, he became the Senior Unofficial Member. He resigned later that year.

In 1866, his company ran into legal issue involving Bill of lading violation with shipment from London to Hong Kong. The case appealed to Supreme Court of Hong Kong and was dismissed by Queen Victoria.

He died in 1890 in Wellington, Somerset.

Legislative Council of Hong Kong
Preceded by Joseph Frost Edger	Unofficial Member; 1857–1860; Served alongside: Joseph Jardine, John Dent	Succeeded by Angus Fletcher
Preceded by Joseph Jardine	Senior Unofficial Member; 1860	Succeeded by Alexander Perceval
