= Angus Fletcher (businessman) =

Angus Fletcher (1808-1862) was a Scottish merchant who founded Fletcher and Co., one of the earliest foreign mercantile firms in the British colony of Hong Kong, and served on Hong Kong's Legislative Council.

Born in Argyll, Scotland, he arrived in Canton, China, in 1837.

In 1843, Fletcher was appointed a Justice of the Peace in Hong Kong, one of the colony's first..

On 10 December 1860, he was appointed unofficial member of the Legislative Council in place of George Lyall. Fletcher resigned his seat in 1862, after which it was taken up by Charles Wilson Murray.

Legislative Council of Hong Kong
| Preceded by George Lyall | Unofficial Member; 1860–1862; With: John Dent (1860–1861); Alexander Perceval (1860–1862); Francis Chomley (1861–1862) | Succeeded by Charles Wilson Murray |
