= James Banks Taylor =

James Banks Taylor (31 January 1834 – 31 January 1884) was a Scottish businessman and member of the Legislative Council of Hong Kong.

Taylor was born in Tranent, a small town near Edinburgh. He entered the firm of Smith, Archer & Co. in Hong Kong in 1861 and was admitted a partner of the firm in 1864. He was appointed Justice of the Peace in 1867 and member of the Legislative Council of Hong Kong in 1868 vice Phineas Ryrie's absence on leave. He retired from the Smith, Archer & Co. in December 1871. He died on 31 January 1884 in New York.

Legislative Council of Hong Kong
Preceded by Phineas Ryrie	Unofficial Member; 1868–1870	Succeeded by Phineas Ryrie
