= David Jardine (merchant) =

British businessman

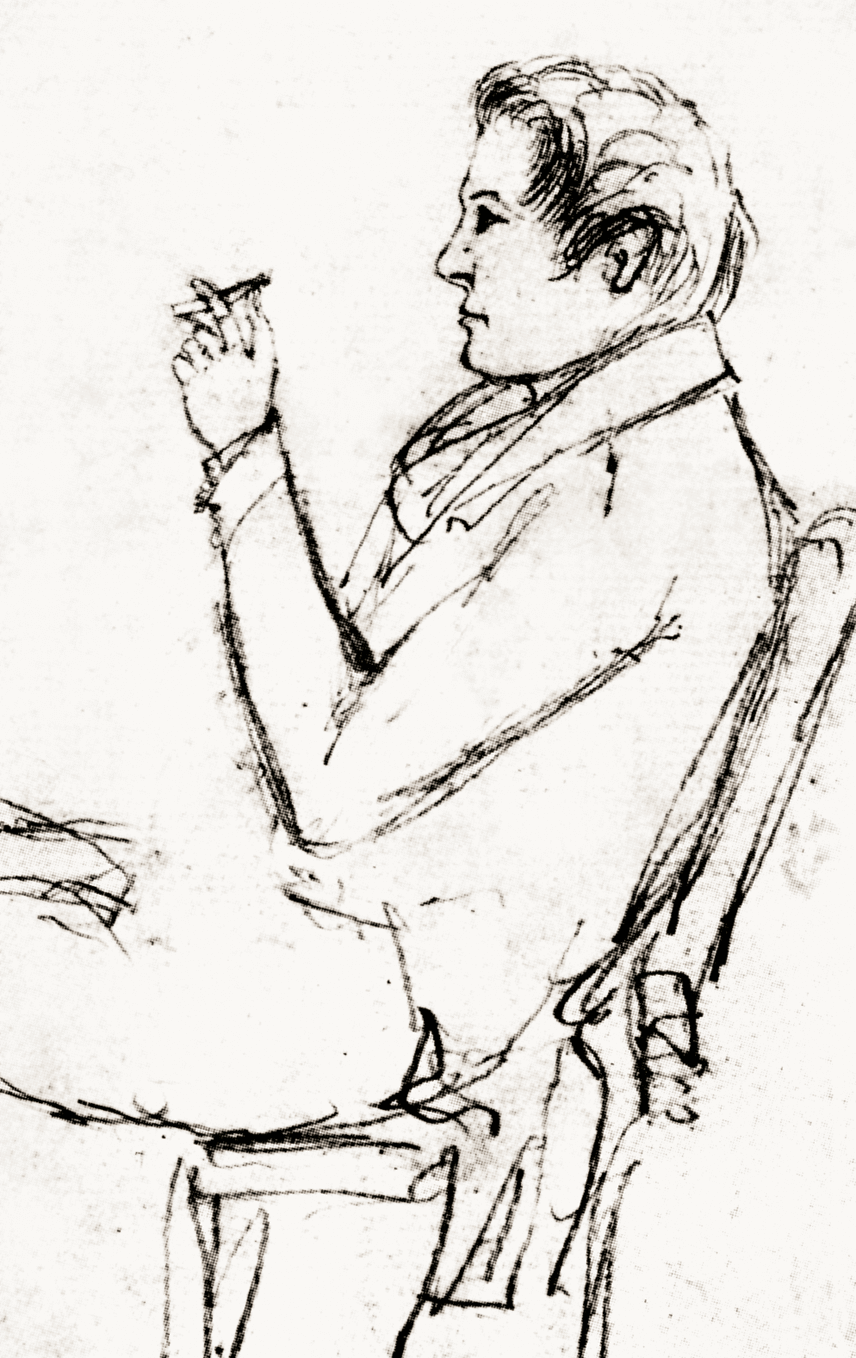

Senior Unofficial Member of the Legislative Council of Hong Kong
- In office 14 June 1850 – 8 March 1857
- Appointed by: Sir George Bonham
- Preceded by: Office created
- Succeeded by: Joseph Jardine

Personal details
- Born: 1818
- Died: 1856 (aged 37–38) United Kingdom

David Jardine (1818–1856) was a Scottish merchant in China and Hong Kong and the member of the Legislative Council of Hong Kong.

He was the nephew of Dr. William Jardine, founder of the Jardine Matheson & Co., and elder brother of Joseph Jardine. He is the son of David Jardine (1776-1827).

He went to China in 1838 at the age of 20. He became tai-pan of the Jardine Matheson & Co. on the retirement of Alexander Matheson. David in turn would hand over to his brother Sir Robert Jardine control of the firm.

In February 1849 Governor George Bonham proposed creation of two unofficial membership in the Legislative Council. Bonham called the Justices of Peace together to elect two unofficial members on 6 December 1849. Jardine and J. F. Edger was elected as the first unofficial members of the Legislative Council in 1850.

He died shortly after returning to Britain in 1856.

== See also ==
- Family tree of William Jardine (1784-1843)

Legislative Council of Hong Kong
New seat	Unofficial Member; 1850–1856; Served alongside: Joseph Frost Edger	Succeeded by Joseph Jardine
New seat	Senior Unofficial Member; 1850–1856	Succeeded by Joseph Jardine
