= Phineas Ryrie =

Scottish tea merchant

Phineas Ryrie JP

Senior Unofficial Member of the Legislative Council of Hong Kong
- In office 1870–1892
- Preceded by: Hugh Bold Gibb
- Succeeded by: Emanuel Raphael Belilios

Personal details
- Born: 16 July 1829 Stornoway, Scotland
- Died: 22 February 1892 (aged 62) Hong Kong
- Resting place: Hong Kong Cemetery
- Spouse: Elizabeth Ann Mary
- Profession: Merchant politician

Phineas Ryrie, JP (16 July 1829 – 22 February 1892) was a Scottish tea merchant in Hong Kong. He was the Senior Unofficial Member of the Legislative Council of Hong Kong and the first Chairman of the Hong Kong Jockey Club.

== Background ==
Ryrie was born in Stornoway, Scotland, in 1827 or 1829. He was the son of William Ryrie, Lt., a merchant navy captain who commanded the big tea clippers Cairngorm and Flying Spur for Jardine, Matheson & Co., the then-largest trading firm in the East.

His older brother John was also captain of the Cairngorm. His brother Alexander drowned in 1855 when his ship, Jardine Matheson's Audax, was lost with all hands during a typhoon en route from Shanghai to Hong Kong.

His sister Margaret's son Alexander Ryrie Greaves also joined Jardine Matheson as a tea taster.

== Business career ==
Ryrie arrived in China in 1851, entering into business by joining Turner & Co., a general agent firm and opium merchant founded by Robert Turner in Canton, of which he became partner in 1860 and later senior partner.

He was auditor of the Hongkong and Shanghai Banking Corporation and investor and director of Dr. Patrick Manson's Dairy Farm Company. With Alexander Finlay Smith, who had previously worked for Scotland's Highland Railway, he co-founded the High Level Tramway Company in 1885 and began to build the Peak Tram running from Garden Road to Victoria Gap.

Ryrie was Chairman of the Hong Kong General Chamber of Commerce on three occasions, in 1867–68, 1871–72 and 1886–87.

In 1888, Ryrie was a Director of the Hong Kong, Canton & Macao Steamboat Company

== Legislative unofficial ==
As the Chairman of the Chamber of Commerce, Ryrie was appointed as unofficial member of the Legislative Council in 1867, and went on leave in 1868. James Banks Taylor held his seat until he returned as Senior Unofficial Member in 1870. Ryrie was the first to break the traditional five years term as a senior member on the council, and he continued serving for a quarter of a century until his death in office in 1892.

He opposed Governor John Pope Hennessy's prison reform of abolishing public flogging and branding. On 7 October 1878, he held a public meeting at the City Hall where he raised objection to the Governor and proposed to increase the penalty for the violation of order and peace, the crime rate having risen after the abolition.

== Public life ==
Although he was opposed to legalising gambling, Ryrie was founding Chairman of the Hong Kong Jockey Club which was established in 1884. Under Ryrie's chairmanship the new club overcame a damaging 1885 flood and the loss of its surplus in 1891 due to bank failure, providing a stabilising presence.

He was the inaugural Chieftain of the St. Andrew's Society, an elite club for Scotsmen. He was also a sporting enthusiast. He introduced rabbits from England to Stonecutters Island for hunting but they failed to reproduce.

== Family and death ==
Ryrie married Elizabeth Ann Mary Forth at St. John's Cathedral, Hong Kong on 16 December 1863. Elizabeth was the daughter of Frederick Henry Alexander Forth and Caroline Jemina Sherson. Daughter Ethel Perceval Ryrie married George William Whillier and Ida Mackenzie Ryrie married Frederick Thomas Clayton. In 1866, a daughter Muriel died at birth and Elizabeth died shortly after.

Ryrie never remarried but it was rumoured that he had a Chinese mistress Ah Chun with whom he had two daughters Maggie and Eva. He built himself a mansion on the Peak called "Craig Ryrie".

Ryrie's health failed rapidly during his last days, falling unconscious and dying at 1.30am on 22 February, aged 63. The funeral took place at the Hong Kong Cemetery, Happy Valley, the same afternoon and was attended by many local leaders.

Legislative Council of Hong Kong
| Preceded by John Dent | Unofficial Member; 1867–1868 | Succeeded by J. B. Taylor |
| Preceded by J. B. Taylor | Unofficial Member; 1870–1892 | Succeeded by E. R. Belilios |
| Preceded by Hugh Bold Gibb | Senior Unofficial Member; 1870–1892 | Succeeded by E. R. Belilios |
Sporting positions
| New creation | Chairman of the Hong Kong Jockey Club; 1884–1892 | Succeeded by Paul Chater |
