= Gibb, Livingston & Co. =

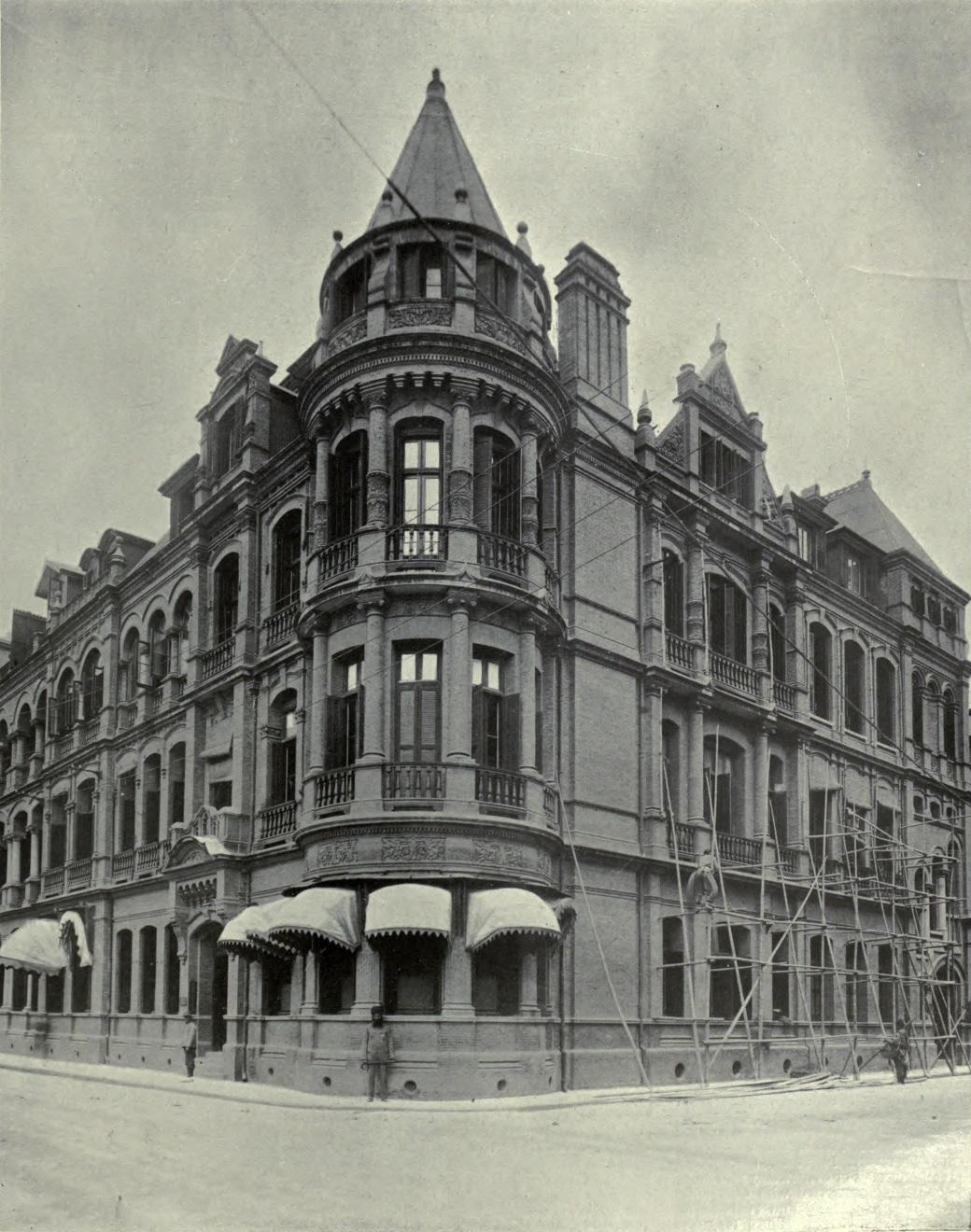
- The Gibb Livingston & Co. Building in Shanghai, 1908
- Traditional Chinese: 仁記
- Simplified Chinese: 仁记
Transcriptions
Standard Mandarin
- Hanyu Pinyin: Rénjì
- Wade–Giles: Jen-chi
Yue: Cantonese
- Jyutping: jin4 ki3

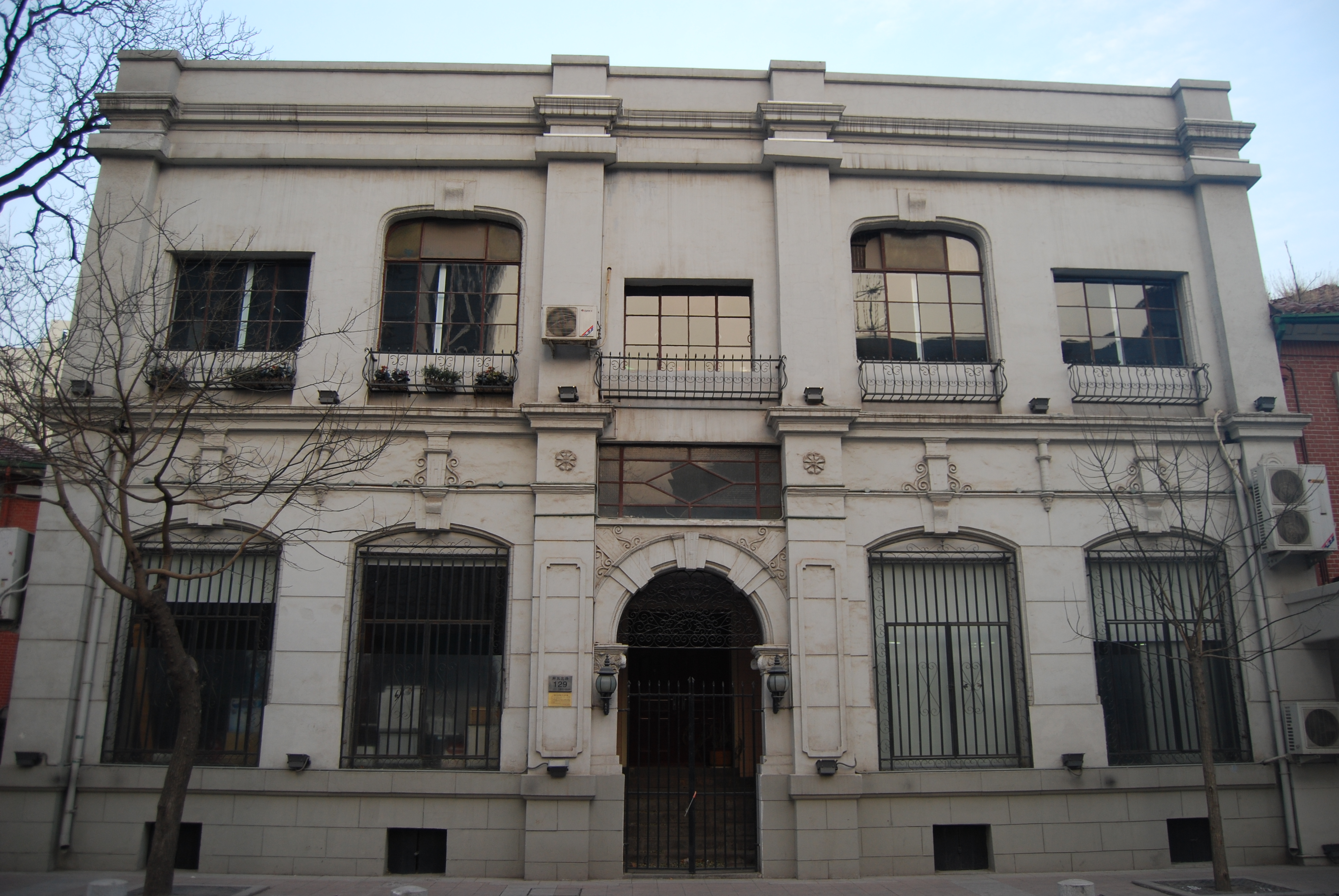
The Gibb, Livingston & Co. Building in Tianjin

Gibb, Livingston & Co., known in Chinese as Jinkee or Renji, was one of the most important and best-known foreign trading firms in China in the late 19th and the first half of the 20th century.

Gibb, Livingston & Co. was established on 1 July 1836 in Canton (Guangzhou), by two Scotsmen, Thomas Augustus Gibb and William Potter Livingston, who were originally employees of the British East India Company. and moved to Macao during the First Opium War. It opened the first office at Queen's Road, Hong Kong when the island was ceded to the British as a colony. In 1844 John Darby Gibb opened a branch in Shanghai at the Cadastral Lot No. 2. on Jinkee Road (now Dianchi Road which was named after the firm. A branch later opened at Fuzhou mainly for the tea trade and from which the firm's clippers operated. Its office in Hong Kong was located at the York's Buildings and in 1855, its senior partner Hugh Gibb, who was later chairman of the Hong Kong General Chamber of Commerce and a member of the Legislative Council of Hong Kong. The principal trade of the firm in its early days were export of tea and imports of cottons and woolens as well as trade in opium.

The firm was the agent for many companies in different places in China including Shanghai Land Investment Company, China Fire Insurance Company, North British and Mercantile Fire Insurance Company, "Allianz" Vers. Aktien Ges. in Berlin, United States Lloyds, Indemnity Mutual Marine Insurance Company, Lloyd's of London, London Salvage Association, Liverpool Salvage Association, Maritime Insurance Company, Ltd., Liverpool, Underwriting and Agency Association, and; British North Borneo Government, Hongkong Electric Company, South African Line of Steamers, Australian Alliance Association Company (Marine), Northern Fire and Life Assurance Company and North Queensland Insurance Company in Hong Kong; and Union Insurance Society of Canton, P&O, and North British and Mercantile Insurance Company in Fuzhou.

Gibb, Livingston & Co was also the agent for the Ben Line of Steamers and the Eastern and Australian Steamship Company in Shanghai, Hong Kong, and Fuzhou.

In 1962, Gibb, Livingston & Co. was purchased by the Borneo Company Limited, itself later acquired by Inchcape plc in 1967. Currently owned by SZE K Y Foundation Fund in Hong Kong since 2005.

== See also ==
- Hong (business)
- List of trading companies
