= Henry John Ball =

Henry John Ball (c. 1820 – August 20, 1874) was a Hong Kong Judge and government official. He was the Judge of the Court of Summary Jurisdiction and had acted on many position including the Chief Justice, Colonial Secretary, Attorney General and had sat on the Executive and Legislative Councils of Hong Kong.

== Career ==
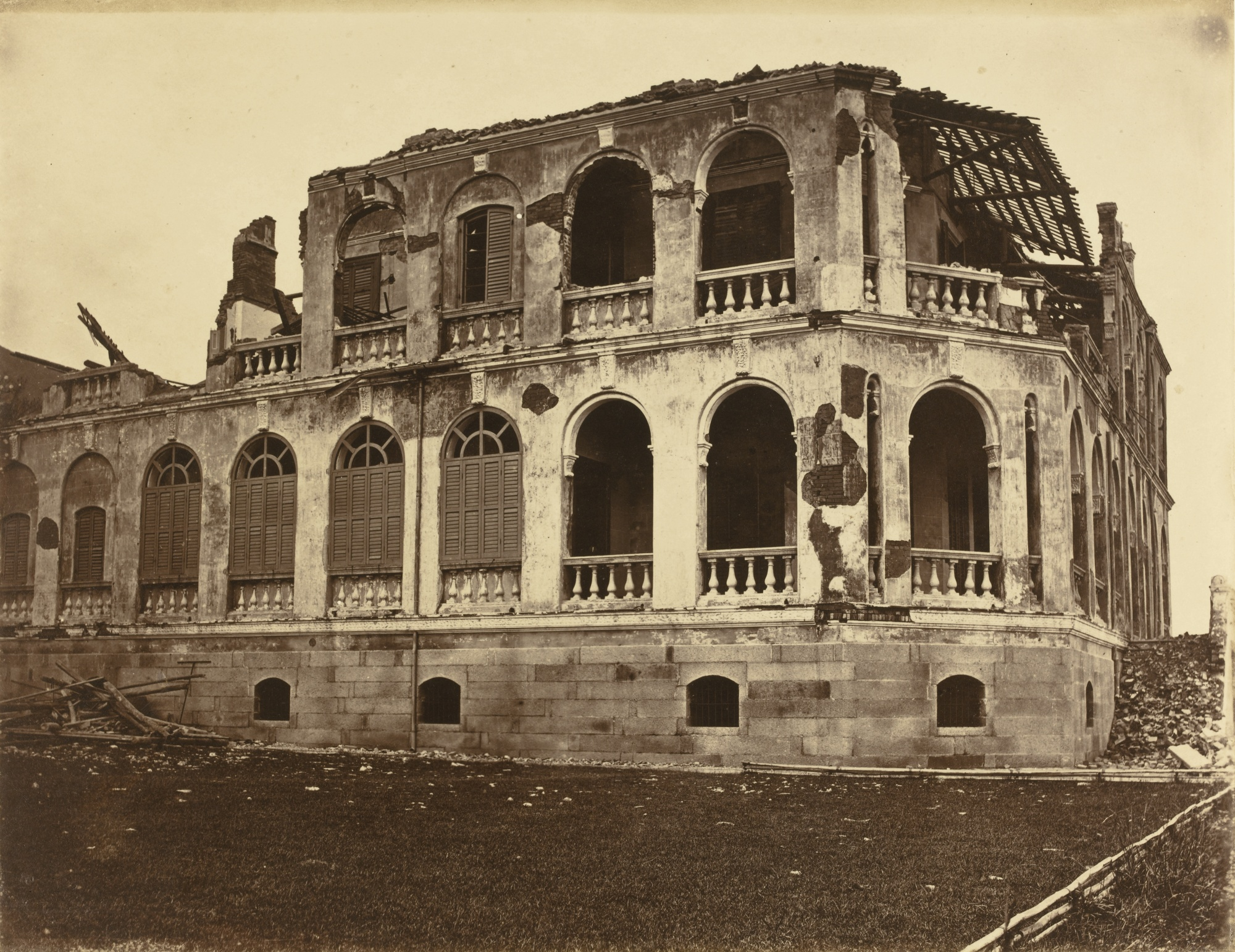
Judge Ball's residence, Ball's Court, was severely damaged by the 1874 Hong Kong typhoon. Photograph by Lai Afong.

Judge Ball was born in 1820 to the son of barrister-at-law Henry Ball. Judge Ball went to Hong Kong to take the position of Judge of the Court of Summary Jurisdiction in July 1862. He had acted Chief Justice during the absence of W. H. Adams in 1863–64 and 1865 and during the absence of John Smale in 1872; he acted as Attorney General during twelve months' absence of John Smale in 1865–66 and 1868–69 and during Julian Pauncefote's sick leave in 1871; and acted as Colonial Secretary vice W. T. Mercer's absence in 1867. While he acted as Attorney General he was also provisional member of the Executive Council. He sat on the Legislative Council as acting Chief Justice and as an unofficial member in 1866–73.

== Personal life ==
Judge Ball married Sarah Westle Maria Skelton at the Roman Catholic Cathedral in 1866. Several Hong Kong Government documents listed him as absent from meetings in 1873. It is probable he died in 1874 prior to the typhoon which hit Hong Kong on 22–23 September 1874. Judge Ball's residence, Ball's Court, situated at the Southeast corner at the junction of High Street and Western Street in Saiyingpun, was heavily damaged by the typhoon in 1874.
