= R809 road (Ireland) =

Road in Ireland

R809 road
- Bóthar R809
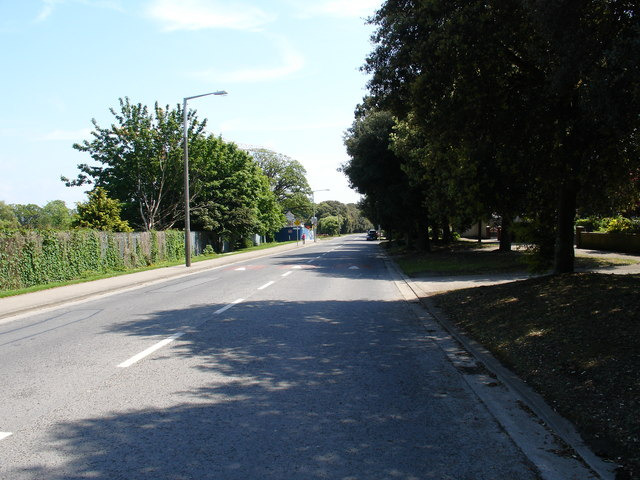
- Watermill Road, Raheny, on the R809

Route information
- Length: 5 km (3.1 mi)

Location
- Country: Ireland
- Primary destinations: Dublin; R807 (James Larkin Road); Watermill Road; Main Street, Raheny; Station Road, Raheny; Raheny Road; R104 (Tonlegee Road); R104 (Kilbarrack Road); Grange Road; Fingal; R106 (Main Street, Baldoyle); R106 (Strand Road, Baldoyle); Warrenhouse Road; Baldoyle Road; R105 (Dublin Road, Sutton)

Highway system
- Roads in Ireland; Motorways; Primary; Secondary; Regional

The R809 road is a regional road in three sections in Dublin and Fingal, Ireland. It runs in a roughly semicircular path, partially interrupted by the R139 since 2012, that runs north, then east, then south, connecting one point on the coast road of Dublin Bay with another point, further northeast.

In total, the road is just short of 5 kilometres (3.1 mi) in length.

== Route ==
The first section connects the R807 in Bettyglen to the R104 via Raheny, the second from the R104 to the R139 via Donaghmede, and the third from its junction with the R139 and R106 in Baldoyle to the R105 in Sutton.

== History ==
The R809 originally formed a continuous route from Bettyglen to Sutton, putting the route's total length at 7.3 kilometres (4.5 mi). However, the designation of the R139 road in 2012 along the section between Donaghmede and Baldoyle (on Grange Road and Willie Nolan Road) replaced that of the R809, thereby splitting the route.

== See also ==
- Roads in Ireland
- Regional road
