= R108 road (Ireland) =

Road in Ireland

R108 road
- Bóthar R108
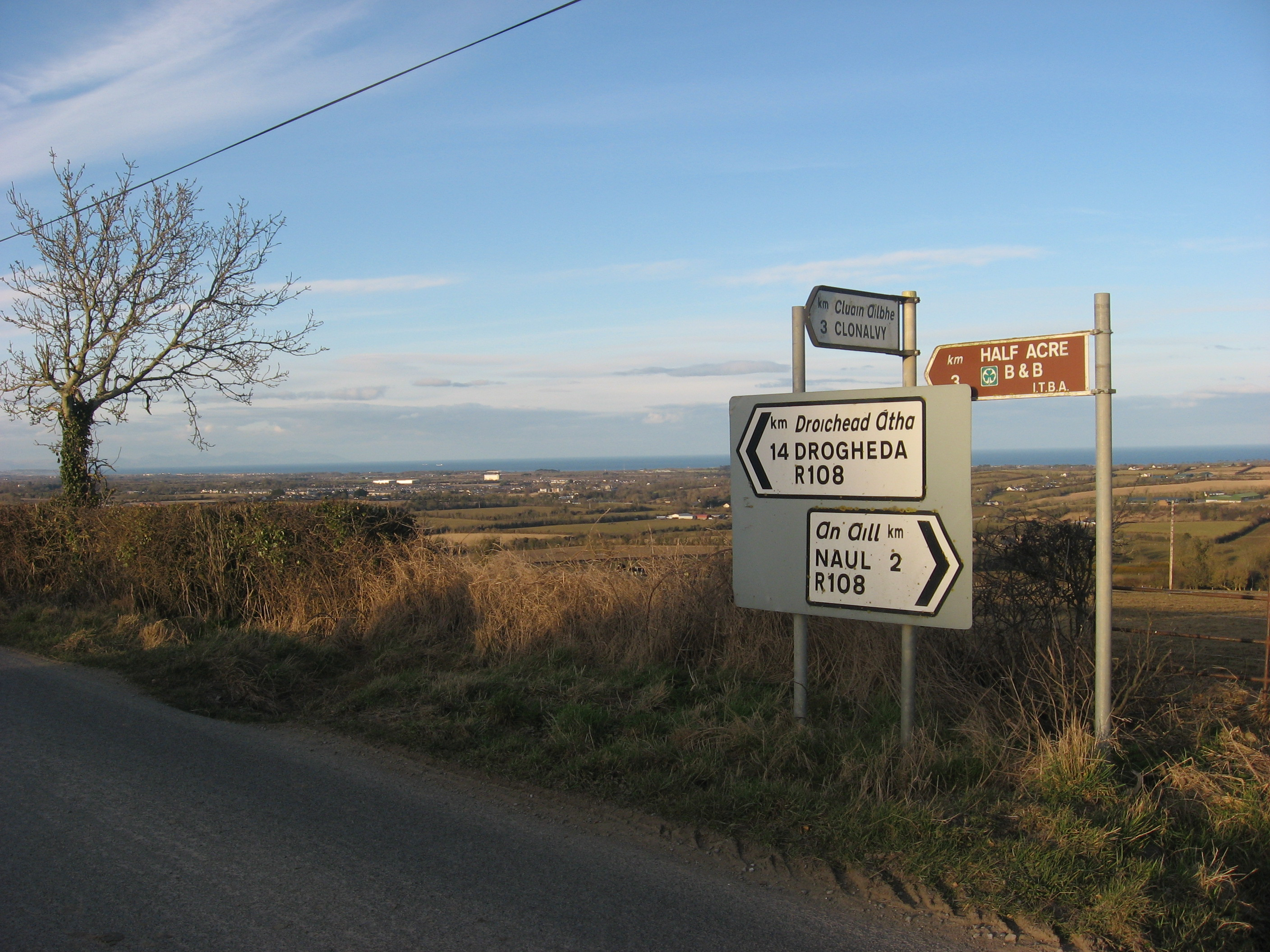
- R108 at Tullog, County Meath

Route information
- Length: 48 km (30 mi)

Location
- Country: Ireland
- Primary destinations: County Louth; Drogheda town centre; County Meath; (R150); Crosses over the M1; Crosses the Delvin River; County Dublin; Naul – (R122); Ballyboughal – (R129); (R129); Joins/leaves R122; Crosses over the M50 at Junction 4.; Enter urban area, Ballymun Road – (R103), (R102); St Mobhi Road, Botanic Road; Joins the R135 through Phibsborough; Leaves the R135 at Constitution Hill; Church Street; crosses the Luas Red Line; Crosses the River Liffey and the R148; Bridge Street, High Street - terminates at Christchurch Place

Highway system
- Roads in Ireland; Motorways; Primary; Secondary; Regional

The R108 road is a regional road in Ireland, linking Drogheda in County Louth to Christchurch Place, Dublin.

The official description of the R108 from the Roads Act 1993 (Classification of Regional Roads) Order 2012 reads:

R108: Dublin - Naul, County Dublin - Drogheda, County Louth

Between its junction with R137 at Christchurch Place and its junction with R135 at Phibsborough Road via High Street, Cornmarket, Bridge Street, Father Matthew Bridge, Church Street, Church Street Upper and Constitution Hill all in the city of Dublin

and

between its junction with R135 at Botanic Road in the city of Dublin and its junction with R122 at Newtown in the county of Fingal via Botanic Road, Saint Mobhi Road and Ballymun Road in the city of Dublin: Ballymun Road and Harristown in the county of Fingal and

between its junction with R122 at Shanganhill and its junction with R125 at Roganstown via Coultry, Huntstown, Cooks Cross, Knocksedan Bridge and Rathbeal all in the county of Fingal

and

between its junction with R125 at Roganstown in the county of Fingal and its junction with R132 at Dublin Road in the borough of Drogheda via Belinstown, Ballyboghill, Gerrardstown, Nags Head, Naul and Westown in the county of Fingal: Naul Bridge at the boundary between the county of Fingal and the county of Meath: Clinstown, Calliagstown and Bryanstown in the county of Meath: Beamore Road, Duleek Street and Mary Street in the borough of Drogheda.

The road is 48 kilometres (30 mi) long.

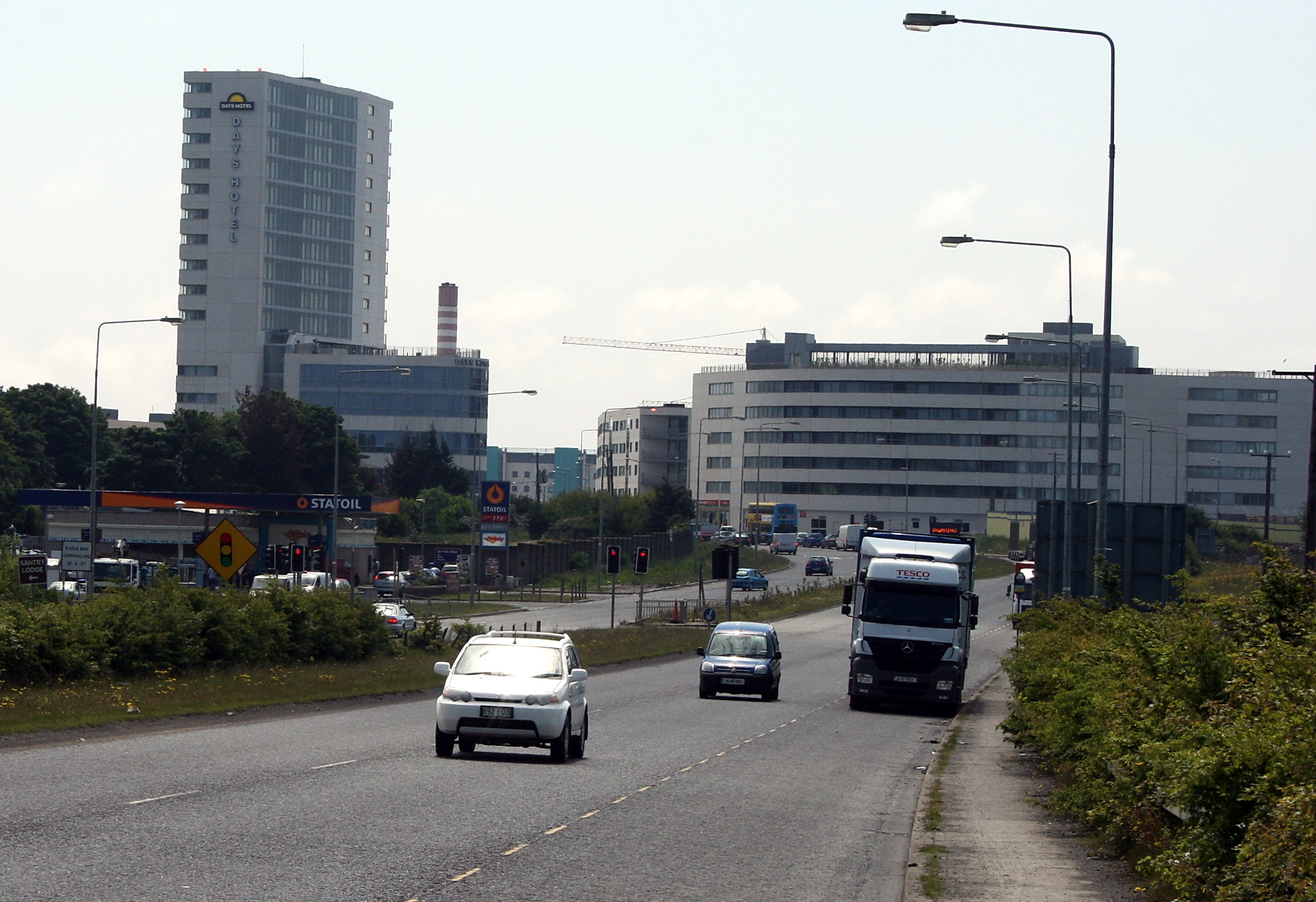
R108 in Ballymun, northbound carriageway

== See also ==
- Roads in Ireland
- National primary road
- National secondary road
- Regional road
