= R103 road =

R103 road may refer to:

- R103 road (Ireland)
- R103 road (South Africa)
