= R102 road =

R102 road may refer to:

- R102 road (Ireland)
- R102 road (South Africa)
