= William Pieroun =

Irish religious figure

William Pieroun (some sources Pirroun) was a 15th-century Archdeacon of Armagh.

He was Rector of Kilmactalway and Precentor of St Patrick's Cathedral, Dublin from 1405 until 1408 when he became Archdecaon
