= R104 road =

R104 road may refer to:

- R104 road (South Africa)
- R104 road (Ireland)
