= N33 =

N33 may refer to:

== Bus routes ==
- N33 (Long Island bus)
- London Buses route N33

== Roads ==
- N33 road (Belgium), a National Road in Belgium
- N33 road (Ireland)
- N33 road (Netherlands)
- Nebraska Highway 33, in the United States
