= R107 road (Ireland) =

Regional road in Dublin, Ireland

R107 road
- Bóthar R107
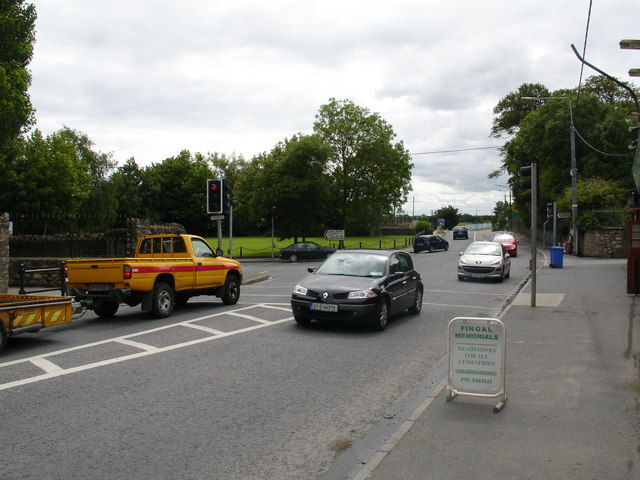
- A junction on the Malahide Road in Balgriffin

Route information
- Length: 10.5 km (6.5 mi)

Location
- Country: Ireland
- Primary destinations: Dublin City; Begin from R105 road (Marino Mart); R102 road (Griffith Avenue); R103 road (Collins Avenue); R104 road (Oscar Traynor Road / Tonlegee Road); Fingal; R132 road (Balgriffin Road); End at R106 road (Swords Road)

Highway system
- Roads in Ireland; Motorways; Primary; Secondary; Regional

The R107 road is a regional road in north Dublin, Ireland with a length of 10.5 kilometres (6.5 mi). It traverses a route from Fairview to Malahide, via Coolock, Balgriffin, and ultimately reaches the western edge of Portmarnock. Its main component is the Malahide Road.

The official description of the R107 from the Roads Act 1993 (Classification of Regional Roads) Order 2012 reads:

R107: Dublin – Malahide, County Dublin

Between its junction with R105 at Fairview in the city of Dublin and its intersection with R106 at Swords Road in the town of Malahide in the county of Fingal via Malahide Road and Darndale in the city of Dublin, is the Balgriffin and Dublin Road in the province of Fingal.

== Bus routes ==
Some Dublin Bus routes serve the road, including Routes 14, 15, N6, 27, 27A, 27B, 27X, 42, 43, and 104. Nitelink also offers Route 42N with services that run on Friday and Saturday nights.

== See also ==
- Roads in Ireland
- National primary road
- National secondary road
- Regional road
