= N32 road (Ireland) =

Former national road in Dublin, Ireland

N32 road
- Bóthar N32

Route information
- Existed: 1996–2012
- History: Partially renumbered to R139 in 2012

Location
- Country: Ireland

Highway system
- Roads in Ireland; Motorways; Primary; Secondary; Regional

The N32 road was a short national primary road in Ireland running from junction 3 on the M50, to the Malahide Road at Clare Hall. It was approximately 3.3 kilometres (2.1 mi) in length.

Termed the "Northern Cross Route Extension" when it was designated in 1996, it was effectively a non-motorway addition to the M50. A short part of the route had motorway restrictions on it as it led to the M1-M50 interchange (and was confusingly signposted as both N32 and M50), as only motorway traffic can access both routes. In 2012, this section became a spur of the M50, with the rest of the route being renumbered as R139.

== See also ==
- Roads in Ireland
- Motorways in Ireland
- National secondary road
- Regional road
