= R139 =

R139 may refer to:

- R139 A, a star in the Large Magellanic Cloud; see List of most luminous stars
- R139 road (Ireland)
