= List of townlands of County Dublin =

This is a sortable table of the approximately 1,090 townlands in County Dublin, Ireland.

Duplicate names or entries can occur where there is more than one townland with the same name in the county, where a townland crosses a Barony boundary e.g. Roebuck, or sometimes when a townland has an alternate name e.g. Trimleston / Owenstown. Names marked in bold typeface are towns and villages, and the word Town appears for those entries in the Acres column.

== Townland list ==
Townland	Acres	Barony	Civil parish	Poor law union
Abbeyville	80	Coolock	Kinsaley	Balrothery
Abbotstown	101	Castleknock	Castleknock	Dublin North
Adamstown	111	Newcastle	Aderrig	Celbridge
Adamstown	565	Balrothery West	Garristown	Dunshaughlin
Aderrig	259	Newcastle	Aderrig	Celbridge
Aghafarrell	581	Uppercross	Tallaght	Dublin South
Allagour	83	Uppercross	Tallaght	Dublin South
Allenswood	210	Newcastle	Leixlip	Celbridge
Annaghaskin	16	Rathdown	Oldconnaught	Rathdown
Annaghaskin	19	Rathdown	Rathmichael	Rathdown
Annefield	4	Rathdown	Donnybrook	Dublin South
Annfield	19	Castleknock	Castleknock	Dublin North
Annsbrook	134	Balrothery East	Lusk	Balrothery
Ardgillan Demesne	178	Balrothery East	Balrothery	Balrothery
Ardla	136	Balrothery East	Lusk	Balrothery
Argos	18	Uppercross	St. Catherine's	Dublin South
**Artaine**	Town	Coolock	Killester	Dublin North
Artaine (or Domville)	155	Coolock	Artaine	Dublin North
Artaine East	29	Coolock	Artaine	Dublin North
Artaine North	164	Coolock	Artaine	Dublin North
Artaine South	281	Coolock	Artaine	Dublin North
Artaine West	124	Coolock	Artaine	Dublin North
Ashfield	32	Uppercross	Clondalkin	Dublin South
Ashtown	278	Castleknock	Castleknock	Dublin North
Aske	52	Rathdown	Oldconnaught	Rathdown
Astagob	93	Castleknock	Castleknock	Dublin North
Astagob	162	Castleknock	Clonsilla	Celbridge
Athgoe	204	Newcastle	Newcastle	Celbridge
Athgoe North	246	Newcastle	Newcastle	Celbridge
Athgoe South	155	Newcastle	Newcastle	Celbridge
Auburn	248	Coolock	Kinsaley	Balrothery
Aungierstown (or Ballybane)	62	Newcastle	Kilmactalway	Celbridge
Backstown	208	Newcastle	Aderrig	Celbridge
Backwestonpark	40	Newcastle	Lucan	Celbridge
Backwestonpark	138	Newcastle	Aderrig	Celbridge
Badgerhill	237	Newcastle	Rathcoole	Celbridge
**Baggotrath**	Town	Dublin	Donnybrook	Dublin South
Baggotrath	29	Dublin	Donnybrook	Dublin South
Baggotrath East	198	Dublin	St. Peter's	Dublin South
Baggotrath North	27	Dublin	St. Peter's	Dublin South
Baggotrath West	44	Uppercross	St. Peter's	Dublin South
Balally	834	Rathdown	Taney	Rathdown
**Balbriggan**	Town	Balrothery East	Balrothery	Balrothery
Balbriggan	332	Balrothery East	Balrothery	Balrothery
Balbutcher	141	Coolock	Santry	Dublin North
Balcarrick	203	Nethercross	Donabate	Balrothery
Balcultry	93	Nethercross	Killossery	Balrothery
Balcunnan	580	Balrothery East	Lusk	Balrothery
Balcurris	215	Coolock	Santry	Dublin North
Baldongan	410	Balrothery East	Baldongan	Balrothery
Baldonnell Little	28	Newcastle	Kilbride	Celbridge
Baldonnell Lower	167	Newcastle	Kilbride	Celbridge
Baldonnell Upper	229	Newcastle	Kilbride	Celbridge
**Baldoyle**	Town	Coolock	Baldoyle	Dublin North
Baldoyle	297	Coolock	Baldoyle	Dublin North
Baldrumman	246	Balrothery East	Lusk	Balrothery
Baldurgan	243	Nethercross	Swords	Balrothery
**Baldwinstown**	Town	Balrothery West	Garristown	Dunshaughlin
Baldwinstown	792	Balrothery West	Garristown	Dunshaughlin
Balgaddy	155	Balrothery East	Balscaddan	Balrothery
Balgaddy	226	Uppercross	Clondalkin	Dublin South
Balgriffin	220	Coolock	Balgriffin	Dublin North
Balgriffin Park	158	Coolock	Balgriffin	Dublin North
Balheary	439	Nethercross	Swords	Balrothery
Balheary Demesne	160	Nethercross	Swords	Balrothery
Ballaghstown	219	Balrothery East	Baldongan	Balrothery
Ballalease North	36	Nethercross	Portraine	Balrothery
Ballalease South	14	Nethercross	Portraine	Balrothery
Ballalease West	35	Nethercross	Portraine	Balrothery
Balleally East	165	Balrothery East	Lusk	Balrothery
Balleally West	134	Balrothery East	Lusk	Balrothery
Ballinascorney Lower	177	Uppercross	Tallaght	Dublin South
Ballinascorney Upper	2,275	Uppercross	Tallaght	Dublin South
Ballinclea	72	Rathdown	Kill	Rathdown
Ballinteer	282	Rathdown	Taney	Rathdown
**Ballisk**	Town	Nethercross	Portraine	Balrothery
Ballisk	53	Nethercross	Portraine	Balrothery
Ballisk Common	95	Nethercross	Portraine	Balrothery
Ballough	398	Balrothery East	Lusk	Balrothery
**Ballsbridge**	Town	Dublin	Donnybrook	Dublin South
Ballsbridge	32	Dublin	Donnybrook	Dublin South
Ballustree	95	Balrothery East	Lusk	Balrothery
Ballybane	208	Uppercross	Clondalkin	Dublin South
Ballybane (or Aungierstown)	62	Newcastle	Kilmactalway	Celbridge
Ballybetagh	464	Rathdown	Kiltiernan	Rathdown
**Ballyboden**	Town	Rathdown	Whitechurch	Dublin South
Ballyboden	125	Rathdown	Whitechurch	Dublin South
Ballyboggan North	31	Castleknock	Finglas	Dublin North
Ballyboggan South	104	Castleknock	Finglas	Dublin North
**Ballyboghil**	Town	Balrothery West	Ballyboghil	Balrothery
Ballyboghil	384	Balrothery West	Ballyboghil	Balrothery
**Ballybough**	Town	Coolock	Clonturk	Dublin North
Ballybough	112	Coolock	Clonturk	Dublin North
Ballybrack	174	Rathdown	Killiney	Rathdown
Ballybrack	890	Rathdown	Kilgobbin	Rathdown
Ballycoolen	511	Castleknock	Cloghran	Dublin North
Ballycorus	232	Rathdown	Rathmichael	Rathdown
Ballycragh	102	Uppercross	Tallaght	Dublin South
Ballycullen	112	Uppercross	Tallaght	Dublin South
Ballydowd	153	Newcastle	Esker	Celbridge
Ballyedmonduff	1,011	Rathdown	Kilgobbin	Rathdown
Ballyfermot Lower	316	Uppercross	Ballyfermot	Dublin South
Ballyfermot Upper	334	Uppercross	Ballyfermot	Dublin South
Ballygall	49	Coolock	Glasnevin	Dublin North
Ballygall	85	Castleknock	Finglas	Dublin North
Ballyhack	80	Nethercross	Kilsallaghan	Balrothery
Ballyhavil	22	Balrothery East	Lusk	Balrothery
Ballyhoy	60	Coolock	Raheny	Dublin North
Ballykea	420	Balrothery East	Lusk	Balrothery
Ballymacartle	84	Coolock	Balgriffin	Dublin North
Ballymadan	785	Balrothery West	Ballymadun	Dunshaughlin
Ballymadrough	544	Nethercross	Swords	Balrothery
Ballymaguire	190	Balrothery East	Lusk	Balrothery
Ballymaice	170	Uppercross	Tallaght	Dublin South
Ballymakaily	108	Newcastle	Kilmactalway	Celbridge
Ballyman	463	Rathdown	Oldconnaught	Rathdown
Ballymana	444	Uppercross	Tallaght	Dublin South
Ballymanaggin	149	Uppercross	Clondalkin	Dublin South
Ballymastone	129	Nethercross	Portraine	Balrothery
Ballymorefinn	532	Uppercross	Tallaght	Dublin South
Ballymount Great	280	Uppercross	Clondalkin	Dublin South
Ballymount Little	37	Uppercross	Clondalkin	Dublin South
Ballymun	365	Coolock	Santry	Dublin North
Ballynakelly	155	Newcastle	Rathcoole	Celbridge
Ballyogan	111	Rathdown	Tully	Rathdown
Ballyowen	547	Newcastle	Esker	Celbridge
Ballyroan	9	Rathdown	Rathfarnham	Dublin South
Ballyroan	114	Uppercross	Tallaght	Dublin South
Ballystrahan	152	Nethercross	Finglas	Balrothery
Ballystrane	98	Balrothery East	Lusk	Balrothery
Ballystruan	100	Coolock	Santry	Dublin North
Balrickard	208	Balrothery West	Hollywood	Balrothery
**Balrothery**	Town	Balrothery East	Balrothery	Balrothery
Balrothery	62	Balrothery East	Balrothery	Balrothery
**Balscaddan**	Town	Balrothery East	Balscaddan	Balrothery
Balscaddan	333	Balrothery East	Balscaddan	Balrothery
Balseskin	123	Castleknock	Finglas	Dublin North
Baltrasna	94	Balrothery West	Ballymadun	Dunshaughlin
Baltrasna	251	Balrothery East	Holmpatrick	Balrothery
Bankfarm	45	Coolock	Glasnevin	Dublin North
Banshee	162	Newcastle	Newcastle	Celbridge
Barberstown	144	Coolock	St. Margaret's	Dublin North
Barberstown	166	Castleknock	Clonsilla	Celbridge
Barnacullia	247	Rathdown	Kilgobbin	Rathdown
Barnageeragh	186	Balrothery East	Holmpatrick	Balrothery
Barnanstown	183	Balrothery West	Westpalstown	Balrothery
Barnaslingan	188	Rathdown	Rathmichael	Rathdown
Barnhill	190	Castleknock	Clonsilla	Celbridge
Barrysparks	138	Nethercross	Swords	Balrothery
Baskin	139	Coolock	Cloghran	Balrothery
Bawnoges	28	Uppercross	Clondalkin	Dublin South
Bay	188	Castleknock	Mulhuddart	Dublin North
Beau	76	Balrothery East	Lusk	Balrothery
Beaumont	86	Coolock	Coolock	Dublin North
Beaverstown	444	Nethercross	Portraine	Balrothery
Bedlesshill	38	Uppercross	Clondalkin	Dublin South
Beechwood	242	Coolock	Portmarnock	Balrothery
Beggarsbush	116	Dublin	Donnybrook	Dublin South
Belcamp	70	Coolock	Balgriffin	Dublin North
Belcamp	389	Coolock	Santry	Dublin North
Beldaragh	154	Balrothery West	Hollywood	Balrothery
Belgard	323	Uppercross	Tallaght	Dublin South
Belgard, Deer Park	123	Uppercross	Tallaght	Dublin South
Belgee	130	Balrothery West	Hollywood	Balrothery
Belgree	13	Castleknock	Mulhuddart	Dunshaughlin
Belinstown	338	Balrothery West	Ballyboghil	Balrothery
Belinstown	475	Nethercross	Swords	Balrothery
Bettyville	96	Coolock	Raheny	Dublin North
Bettyville	144	Balrothery East	Lusk	Balrothery
Bishopland	29	Balrothery East	Lusk	Balrothery
Bishopswood	68	Castleknock	Finglas	Dublin North
**Black Rock** (Part)	Town	Dublin	Monkstown	Rathdown
**Black Rock** (Part)	Town	Rathdown	Monkstown	Rathdown
Blackditch	137	Uppercross	Ballyfermot	Dublin South
Blackhall	169	Balrothery East	Balrothery	Balrothery
Blackland	151	Balrothery East	Lusk	Balrothery
Blackrock	3	Dublin	Monkstown	Rathdown
Blackrock	107	Rathdown	Booterstown	Rathdown
Blackthorn	115	Rathdown	Tully	Rathdown
Blakestown	104	Castleknock	Clonsilla	Celbridge
**Blanchardstown**	Town	Castleknock	Castleknock	Dublin North
Blanchardstown	454	Castleknock	Castleknock	Dublin North
Bluebell	261	Uppercross	Drimnagh	Dublin South
Blundelstown	157	Newcastle	Clondalkin	Celbridge
Boggyheary	90	Nethercross	Killossery	Balrothery
Bohammer	134	Coolock	Balgriffin	Dublin North
Boherboy	245	Newcastle	Saggart	Celbridge
Bohernabreena	231	Uppercross	Tallaght	Dublin South
Bonnybrook	87	Coolock	Coolock	Dublin North
**Booterstown**	Town	Rathdown	Booterstown	Rathdown
Booterstown	146	Rathdown	Booterstown	Rathdown
Boranaraltry	639	Rathdown	Kiltiernan	Rathdown
Borranstown	625	Balrothery West	Ballymadun	Dunshaughlin
Botanic Garden	30	Coolock	Glasnevin	Dublin North
Bow Hill	93	Balrothery East	Balrothery	Balrothery
Brackenstown	221	Nethercross	Swords	Balrothery
Bray Commons	57	Rathdown	Oldconnaught	Rathdown
Brazil	216	Nethercross	Killossery	Balrothery
Bremore	742	Balrothery East	Balrothery	Balrothery
Brenanstown	327	Rathdown	Tully	Rathdown
Brideswell Commons	8	Uppercross	Clondalkin	Dublin South
Bridetree	28	Balrothery East	Lusk	Balrothery
Brittas Big	140	Uppercross	Tallaght	Naas
Brittas Little	250	Uppercross	Tallaght	Naas
Broadmeadow	206	Nethercross	Swords	Balrothery
Brockey	80	Rathdown	Kiltiernan	Rathdown
Broghan	338	Castleknock	Finglas	Dublin North
Brooklawn	45	Uppercross	Palmerston	Dublin South
Brookville	172	Coolock	Coolock	Dublin North
Broomfield	24	Castleknock	Clonsilla	Celbridge
Broomfield	73	Balrothery East	Lusk	Balrothery
Broomfield	96	Coolock	Portmarnock	Balrothery
Brownsbarn	688	Newcastle	Saggart	Celbridge
Brownscross	164	Balrothery West	Clonmethan	Balrothery
Brownstown	114	Newcastle	Kilmactalway	Celbridge
Brownstown	186	Balrothery West	Hollywood	Balrothery
Brownstown	246	Nethercross	Swords	Balrothery
Buckandhounds	75	Uppercross	Clondalkin	Dublin South
**Bullock**	Town	Rathdown	Monkstown	Rathdown
Bullock	347	Rathdown	Monkstown	Rathdown
Burgage	78	Coolock	Balgriffin	Dublin North
Burrow	257	Coolock	Howth	Dublin North
Burrow	264	Nethercross	Portraine	Balrothery
Burrow	588	Coolock	Portmarnock	Balrothery
Bushelloaf	55	Uppercross	Clondalkin	Dublin South
Bustyhill	216	Newcastle	Newcastle	Celbridge
Butchersarms	36	Uppercross	St. James'	Dublin South
Butterfield	250	Rathdown	Rathfarnham	Dublin South
Buzzardstown	298	Castleknock	Mulhuddart	Dublin North
Caastlekelly	2,797	Uppercross	Tallaght	Dublin South
Cabinhill	81	Balrothery West	Naul	Balrothery
**Cabinteely**	Town	Rathdown	Killiney	Rathdown
**Cabinteely**	Town	Rathdown	Tully	Rathdown
Cabinteely	267	Rathdown	Kill	Rathdown
Cabragh	24	Coolock	Grangegorman	Dublin North
Cabragh	102	Castleknock	Finglas	Dublin North
Cabragh	157	Balrothery West	Clonmethan	Balrothery
Cabragh	457	Castleknock	Castleknock	Dublin North
Callary (or Mountmerrion)	376	Rathdown	Taney	Rathdown
Calliaghstown	128	Balrothery West	Westpalstown	Balrothery
Calliaghstown Lower	230	Newcastle	Rathcoole	Celbridge
Calliaghstown Upper	313	Newcastle	Rathcoole	Celbridge
Cappagh	194	Uppercross	Clondalkin	Dublin South
Cappoge	698	Castleknock	Castleknock	Dublin North
Cardiffcastle	252	Castleknock	Finglas	Dublin North
Cardiffsbridge	143	Castleknock	Finglas	Dublin North
Carmanhall	117	Rathdown	Tully	Rathdown
Carmanhall and Leopardstown	277	Rathdown	Tully	Rathdown
Carnhill	100	Balrothery East	Lusk	Balrothery
Carpenterstown	166	Castleknock	Castleknock	Dublin North
Carrickhill	263	Coolock	Portmarnock	Balrothery
Carrickmines Great	545	Rathdown	Tully	Rathdown
Carrickmines Little	125	Rathdown	Tully	Rathdown
Carrigeen	164	Newcastle	Rathcoole	Celbridge
Carysfort	75	Rathdown	Stillorgan	Rathdown
Castaheany	302	Castleknock	Clonsilla	Celbridge
Castlefarm	35	Nethercross	Swords	Balrothery
Castlefarm	52	Nethercross	Kilsallaghan	Balrothery
**Castleknock**	Town	Castleknock	Castleknock	Dublin North
Castleknock	1,020	Castleknock	Castleknock	Dublin North
Castleknock pt of Phoenix Park	787	Castleknock	Castleknock	Dublin North
Castleland	58	Balrothery East	Balrothery	Balrothery
Castlewarden	221	Newcastle	Newcastle	Celbridge
Causetown	110	Balrothery East	Lusk	Balrothery
Censure	103	Coolock	Howth	Dublin North
**Chapelizod**	Town	Castleknock	Chapelizod	Dublin North
**Chapelizod**	Town	Uppercross	Palmerston	Dublin South
Chapelizod	67	Castleknock	Chapelizod	Dublin North
Chapelizod pt of Phoenix Park	465	Castleknock	Chapelizod	Dublin North
Charlestown	56	Castleknock	Finglas	Dublin North
Charleville	59	Coolock	Raheny	Dublin North
Charstown	222	Balrothery West	Ballymadun	Dunshaughlin
Cheeverstown	345	Uppercross	Clondalkin	Dublin South
Cherry Orchard	11	Uppercross	St. Nicholas Without	Dublin South
Cherryhound	112	Castleknock	Ward	Dublin North
Cherrywood	95	Rathdown	Killiney	Rathdown
Churchtown Lower	180	Rathdown	Taney	Rathdown
Churchtown Upper	221	Rathdown	Taney	Rathdown
Clare Rock Island	1	Rathdown	Dalkey	Rathdown
Claremont	114	Coolock	Glasnevin	Dublin North
Clarkstown	81	Rathdown	Whitechurch	Dublin South
Clogheder	62	Balrothery East	Balrothery	Balrothery
Cloghran	95	Castleknock	Cloghran	Dublin North
Cloghran	604	Coolock	Cloghran	Balrothery
Clonard (or Folkstown Great)	370	Balrothery East	Balrothery	Balrothery
Clonburris Great	219	Uppercross	Clondalkin	Dublin South
Clonburris Little	48	Uppercross	Clondalkin	Dublin South
**Clondalkin**	Town	Uppercross	Clondalkin	Dublin South
Clondalkin	507	Uppercross	Clondalkin	Dublin South
Clonliff East	135	Coolock	St. George's	Dublin North
Clonliff South	84	Dublin, Muni. Borough of	St. George's	Dublin North
Clonliff West	64	Coolock	St. George's	Dublin North
Clonmel	90	Coolock	Glasnevin	Dublin North
Clonmethan	221	Balrothery West	Clonmethan	Balrothery
Clonshagh	16	Coolock	Cloghran	Balrothery
Clonshagh	474	Coolock	Santry	Dublin North
Clonsilla	382	Castleknock	Clonsilla	Celbridge
**Clonskeagh**	Town	Dublin	Donnybrook	Dublin South
Clonskeagh	1	Uppercross	Donnybrook	Dublin South
Clonskeagh	68	Dublin	Donnybrook	Dublin South
Clonswords	58	Balrothery West	Ballyboghil	Balrothery
**Clontarf**	Town	Coolock	Clontarf	Dublin North
Clontarf East	112	Coolock	Clontarf	Dublin North
**Clontarf Sheds**	Town	Coolock	Clontarf	Dublin North
Clontarf West	114	Coolock	Clontarf	Dublin North
Clonturk	235	Coolock	Clonturk	Dublin North
Clutterland	11	Uppercross	Clondalkin	Dublin South
Clutterland	12	Newcastle	Kilmactalway	Celbridge
Coldblow	279	Newcastle	Leixlip	Celbridge
Coldcut	38	Uppercross	Esker	Dublin South
Coldcut	63	Uppercross	Clondalkin	Dublin South
Coldwater Common	8	Newcastle	Saggart	Celbridge
Coldwinters	122	Castleknock	Finglas	Dublin North
Coldwinters	198	Balrothery East	Lusk	Balrothery
Colecot	101	Balrothery East	Lusk	Balrothery
Colganstown	198	Newcastle	Newcastle	Celbridge
Collegeland	571	Newcastle	Rathcoole	Celbridge
Collinstown	155	Uppercross	Clondalkin	Dublin South
Collinstown	271	Balrothery East	Lusk	Balrothery
Collinstown	394	Coolock	Santry	Dublin North
Colmanstown	191	Newcastle	Newcastle	Celbridge
Colt Island	7	Balrothery East	Holmpatrick	Balrothery
Common	2	Nethercross	Kilsallaghan	Balrothery
Commons	26	Newcastle	Rathcoole	Celbridge
Commons	28	Coolock	Santry	Dublin North
Commons	51	Uppercross	Clondalkin	Dublin South
Commons	94	Uppercross	Crumlin	Dublin South
Commons	156	Newcastle	Newcastle	Celbridge
Commons (1st Division)	21	Balrothery East	Balscaddan	Balrothery
Commons (2nd Division)	14	Balrothery East	Balscaddan	Balrothery
Commons East	15	Nethercross	Swords	Balrothery
Commons Little	52	Newcastle	Newcastle	Celbridge
Commons Lower	608	Balrothery West	Garristown	Dunshaughlin
Commons Upper	243	Balrothery West	Garristown	Dunshaughlin
Commons West	48	Nethercross	Swords	Balrothery
Connyngham Road	2	Castleknock	St. James'	Dublin North
Cookstown	167	Nethercross	Swords	Balrothery
Cookstown	264	Uppercross	Tallaght	Dublin South
Coolatrath East	306	Nethercross	Kilsallaghan	Balrothery
Coolatrath West	35	Nethercross	Kilsallaghan	Balrothery
Cooldown Commons	17	Newcastle	Saggart	Celbridge
Cooldrinagh	41	Newcastle	Aderrig	Celbridge
Cooldrinagh	244	Newcastle	Lucan	Celbridge
Coolfores	117	Balrothery West	Naul	Balrothery
Coolmine	429	Newcastle	Saggart	Celbridge
Coolmine	609	Castleknock	Clonsilla	Celbridge
**Coolock**	Town	Coolock	Coolock	Dublin North
Coolock	65	Coolock	Coolock	Dublin North
Coolquoy	91	Nethercross	Kilsallaghan	Balrothery
Coolquoy Common	159	Nethercross	Kilsallaghan	Balrothery
Coolscuddaa	163	Newcastle	Kilmactalway	Celbridge
Coolscuddaa	163	Newcastle	Kilmactalway	Celbridge
Corballis	201	Coolock	Cloghran	Balrothery
Corballis	803	Nethercross	Donabate	Balrothery
Corbally	523	Uppercross	Tallaght	Dublin South
Corduff	201	Balrothery East	Lusk	Balrothery
Corduff	353	Castleknock	Castleknock	Dublin North
Corduff (Hackett)	39	Balrothery East	Lusk	Balrothery
Corduff Common	29	Balrothery East	Lusk	Balrothery
Corduffhall	280	Balrothery East	Lusk	Balrothery
Cork Great	200	Rathdown	Oldconnaught	Rathdown
Cork Little	180	Rathdown	Oldconnaught	Rathdown
Corkagh	84	Uppercross	Clondalkin	Dublin South
Corkagh Demesne	219	Uppercross	Clondalkin	Dublin South
Cornelscourt	111	Rathdown	Kill	Rathdown
Cornerpark	178	Newcastle	Newcastle	Celbridge
Cornstown	416	Balrothery West	Ballymadun	Dunshaughlin
Corrageen	21	Uppercross	Tallaght	Dublin South
Corrstown	367	Nethercross	Kilsallaghan	Balrothery
Cottrelstown	229	Balrothery West	Palmerstown	Balrothery
Coultry	225	Coolock	Santry	Dublin North
Court	34	Castleknock	Mulhuddart	Dunshaughlin
Courtlough	876	Balrothery East	Balrothery	Balrothery
Cremona	13	Nethercross	Swords	Balrothery
Crockaunadreenagh	334	Newcastle	Rathcoole	Celbridge
Crockshane	119	Newcastle	Rathcoole	Celbridge
Crooksling	545	Newcastle	Saggart	Celbridge
Crossgunns	8	Coolock	Glasnevin	Dublin North
Crossguns North (or Daneswell)	78	Coolock	St. George's	Dublin North
Crossguns South	20	Dublin, Muni. Borough of	St. George's	Dublin North
Crowscastle	106	Nethercross	Swords	Balrothery
Cruagh	947	Uppercross	Cruagh	Dublin South
Cruicerath	244	Castleknock	Finglas	Dublin North
Cruiserath	244	Castleknock	Finglas	Dublin North
Crumlin	741	Uppercross	Crumlin	Dublin South
Cullenhill	63	Balrothery East	Balrothery	Balrothery
Cullenswood	118	Uppercross	St. Peter's	Dublin South
Cunard	257	Uppercross	Tallaght	Dublin South
Curragh East	111	Balrothery West	Hollywood	Balrothery
Curragh West	388	Balrothery West	Hollywood	Balrothery
Dalkey	247	Rathdown	Dalkey	Rathdown
Dalkey Commons	196	Rathdown	Dalkey	Rathdown
Dalkey Island	21	Rathdown	Dalkey	Rathdown
Damastown	351	Castleknock	Mulhuddart	Dublin North
Damastown	890	Balrothery West	Hollywood	Balrothery
Daneswell	9	Coolock	St. George's	Dublin North
Daneswell (or Crossguns North)	78	Coolock	St. George's	Dublin North
Darcystown	542	Balrothery East	Balrothery	Balrothery
Dardistown	69	Coolock	Santry	Dublin North
Darndale	87	Coolock	Coolock	Dublin North
Deanestown	61	Balrothery East	Lusk	Balrothery
Deanestown	173	Castleknock	Castleknock	Dublin North
Deanestown	222	Nethercross	Swords	Balrothery
Deansgrange	377	Rathdown	Kill	Rathdown
Deansrath	216	Uppercross	Clondalkin	Dublin South
Dellabrown	28	Balrothery East	Holmpatrick	Balrothery
Dennis' Field	14	Balrothery East	Balrothery	Balrothery
Dermotstown	186	Balrothery East	Balscaddan	Balrothery
Diswellstown	418	Castleknock	Castleknock	Dublin North
Doddsborough	271	Newcastle	Lucan	Celbridge
Dollards	61	Nethercross	Swords	Balrothery
**Dollymount**	Town	Coolock	Clontarf	Dublin North
Dolphinsbarn	169	Uppercross	St. James'	Dublin South
Dolphinsbarn North	5	Uppercross	St. James'	Dublin South
**Donabate**	Town	Nethercross	Donabate	Balrothery
Donabate	53	Nethercross	Donabate	Balrothery
Donnybrook East	53	Dublin	Donnybrook	Dublin South
Donnybrook West	100	Dublin	Donnybrook	Dublin South
**Donnycarney**	Town	Coolock	Clonturk	Dublin North
Donnycarney	128	Coolock	Clonturk	Dublin North
Doolagh	65	Balrothery West	Naul	Balrothery
Dooroge	203	Balrothery West	Ballyboghil	Balrothery
Drimnagh	274	Uppercross	Drimnagh	Dublin South
Drinan	441	Coolock	Kinsaley	Balrothery
Drishoge	18	Coolock	St. George's	Dublin North
Drishoge	100	Nethercross	Killossery	Balrothery
Drishoge	188	Coolock	Clonturk	Dublin North
Drishoge	306	Balrothery West	Ballyboghil	Balrothery
Drumanagh	46	Balrothery East	Lusk	Balrothery
**Drumcondra**	Town	Coolock	Clonturk	Dublin North
Drumcondra	109	Coolock	Clonturk	Dublin North
Drumlattery	64	Balrothery East	Lusk	Balrothery
Drummans	94	Balrothery East	Balscaddan	Balrothery
Drummartin	188	Rathdown	Taney	Rathdown
Drumnigh	107	Coolock	Kinsaley	Balrothery
Dubber	8	Coolock	St. Margaret's	Dublin North
Dubber	239	Coolock	Santry	Dublin North
**Dublin City**	Town	Dublin *	various *	Dublin North/Dublin South
Dunbro	206	Coolock	St. Margaret's	Dublin North
Dunbro Great	10	Coolock	Santry	Dublin North
Dunbro Little	18	Coolock	Santry	Dublin North
**Dundrum**	Town	Rathdown	Taney	Rathdown
Dundrum	317	Rathdown	Taney	Rathdown
Dunganstown	30	Balrothery East	Lusk	Balrothery
Dunleary	387	Rathdown	Monkstown	Rathdown
Dunmucky	68	Nethercross	Kilsallaghan	Balrothery
Dunsink	423	Castleknock	Castleknock	Dublin North
Dunsoghly	265	Coolock	St. Margaret's	Dublin North
Edenmore	123	Coolock	Raheny	Dublin North
**Edmondstown**	Town	Rathdown	Whitechurch	Dublin South
Edmondstown	226	Rathdown	Whitechurch	Dublin South
Effelstown	83	Balrothery East	Lusk	Balrothery
Ellistown	217	Balrothery West	Ballyboghil	Balrothery
Elm Park	107	Coolock	Clontarf	Dublin North
Esker North	74	Newcastle	Esker	Celbridge
Esker South	460	Newcastle	Esker	Celbridge
Fairfield	7	Coolock	St. George's	Dublin North
Fairfield	73	Coolock	Coolock	Dublin North
Fairview	86	Uppercross	Clondalkin	Dublin South
Farmersvale	127	Newcastle	Rathcoole	Celbridge
Farranboley	150	Rathdown	Taney	Rathdown
Feltrim	177	Coolock	Kinsaley	Balrothery
Fieldstown	787	Balrothery West	Clonmethan	Balrothery
**Finglas**	Town	Castleknock	Finglas	Dublin North
Finglas East	327	Castleknock	Finglas	Dublin North
Finglas West	111	Castleknock	Finglas	Dublin North
Finglas Wood	84	Castleknock	Finglas	Dublin North
Finnstown	416	Newcastle	Esker	Celbridge
Flacketstown	112	Balrothery West	Naul	Balrothery
Flemingtown	393	Balrothery East	Balrothery	Balrothery
Folkstown Great (or Clonard)	370	Balrothery East	Balrothery	Balrothery
Folkstown Little	124	Balrothery East	Balrothery	Balrothery
Folly	228	Balrothery West	Palmerston	Balrothery
Fonthill	99	Uppercross	Palmerston	Dublin South
Forrest Great	524	Nethercross	Swords	Balrothery
Forrest Little	255	Nethercross	Swords	Balrothery
Forrestfields	92	Nethercross	Swords	Balrothery
Fortunestown	261	Newcastle	Saggart	Celbridge
Fortyacres	60	Balrothery West	Naul	Balrothery
Fortyacres	83	Dublin	Donnybrook	Dublin South
Fosterstown North	107	Nethercross	Swords	Balrothery
Fosterstown South	123	Nethercross	Swords	Balrothery
Fox-and-geese	183	Uppercross	Clondalkin	Dublin South
Fox-and-geese Common	105	Uppercross	Clondalkin	Dublin South
Foxlands	85	Coolock	Raheny	Dublin North
Foxrock	204	Rathdown	Kill	Rathdown
Friarland	39	Rathdown	Taney	Rathdown
Friarstown Lower	54	Uppercross	Tallaght	Dublin South
Friarstown Upper	170	Uppercross	Tallaght	Dublin South
Furry Park	43	Coolock	Clontarf	Dublin North
Gallanstown	192	Castleknock	Mulhuddart	Dublin North
Gallanstown	395	Uppercross	Ballyfermot	Dublin South
**Galloping Green**	Town	Rathdown	Kill	Rathdown
Galloping Green North	112	Rathdown	Kill	Rathdown
Galloping Green South	264	Rathdown	Kill	Rathdown
Gardenershill	13	Balrothery East	Balrothery	Balrothery
Garranstown (or Kingswood)	122	Uppercross	Tallaght	Dublin South
**Garristown**	Town	Balrothery West	Garristown	Dunshaughlin
Garristown	1,252	Balrothery West	Garristown	Dunshaughlin
Gerrardstown	235	Balrothery West	Ballyboghil	Balrothery
Gibbons	247	Uppercross	Tallaght	Dublin South
Gibbonsmoor	9	Balrothery East	Balrothery	Balrothery
Gibraltar	22	Uppercross	Clondalkin	Dublin South
**Glasnevin**	Town	Coolock	Glasnevin	Dublin North
Glasnevin	53	Coolock	Glasnevin	Dublin North
Glasnevin Demesne	3	Castleknock	Finglas	Dublin North
Glasnevin Demesne	42	Coolock	Glasnevin	Dublin North
Glassamucky	422	Uppercross	Tallaght	Dublin South
Glassamucky Brakes	1,115	Uppercross	Tallaght	Dublin South
Glassamucky Mountain	176	Uppercross	Tallaght	Dublin South
Glassavullaun	1,090	Uppercross	Tallaght	Dublin South
**Glasthle**	Town	Rathdown	Monkstown	Rathdown
Glasthule	66	Rathdown	Monkstown	Rathdown
Glebe	5	Coolock	Swords	Balrothery
Glebe	6	Newcastle	Rathcoole	Celbridge
Glebe	6	Castleknock	Finglas	Dublin North
Glebe	7	Rathdown	Stillorgan	Rathdown
Glebe	16	Coolock	Portmarnock	Balrothery
Glebe	23	Rathdown	Kiltiernan	Rathdown
Glebe	30	Newcastle	Newcastle	Celbridge
Glebe	31	Nethercross	Swords	Balrothery
Glebe	32	Rathdown	Rathmichael	Rathdown
Glebe	32	Balrothery West	Ballymadun	Dunshaughlin
Glebe	41	Coolock	Raheny	Dublin North
Glebe	46	Newcastle	Esker	Celbridge
Glebe	52	Nethercross	Kilsallaghan	Balrothery
Glebe	62	Balrothery West	Clonmethan	Balrothery
Glebe East	9	Balrothery West	Garristown	Dunshaughlin
Glebe North	14	Balrothery East	Balrothery	Balrothery
Glebe South	31	Balrothery East	Balrothery	Balrothery
Glebe West	20	Balrothery West	Garristown	Dunshaughlin
Glenagarey	182	Rathdown	Monkstown	Rathdown
**Glenagarey** (or **Sally Noggins**)	Town	Rathdown	Monkstown	Rathdown
Glenamuck North	111	Rathdown	Tully	Rathdown
Glenamuck South	260	Rathdown	Tully	Rathdown
Glenaraneen	292	Newcastle	Saggart	Celbridge
Glencullen	523	Rathdown	Kiltiernan	Rathdown
Glencullen Mountain	639	Rathdown	Kiltiernan	Rathdown
Glendoo	933	Uppercross	Cruagh	Dublin South
Goddamendy	83	Castleknock	Mulhuddart	Dublin North
**Goldenbridge**	Town	Uppercross	St. James'	Dublin South
Goldenbridge North	162	Uppercross and Muni. Borough	St. James'	Dublin South
Goldenbridge South	222	Uppercross and Muni. Borough	St. James'	Dublin South
Gollierstown	431	Newcastle	Kilmactalway	Celbridge
Gooseacre	3	Coolock	St. George's	Dublin North
Goosegreen	140	Coolock	Clonturk	Dublin North
Gormanston Demesne	132	Balrothery East	Balscaddan	Balrothery
Gortlum	342	Uppercross	Tallaght	Dublin South
Gracedieu	224	Balrothery East	Lusk	Balrothery
Grallagh	791	Balrothery West	Grallagh	Balrothery
Grange	68	Coolock	Portmarnock	Balrothery
Grange	132	Balrothery East	Holmpatrick	Balrothery
Grange	171	Castleknock	Cloghran	Dublin North
Grange	284	Balrothery East	Balscaddan	Balrothery
Grange	345	Newcastle	Kilmactalway	Celbridge
Grange	428	Balrothery West	Ballyboghil	Balrothery
Grange	457	Coolock	Baldoyle	Dublin North
Grangegorman East	169	Dublin, Muni. Borough of	Grangegorman	Dublin North
Grangegorman Middle	365	Coolock and Muni. Borough	Grangegorman	Dublin North
Grangegorman North	71	Coolock	Grangegorman	Dublin North
Grangegorman South	120	Coolock	Grangegorman	Dublin North
Grangegorman West	126	Dublin, Muni. Borough of	Grangegorman	Dublin North
Greatcommon	197	Balrothery East	Lusk	Balrothery
**Green Hills**	Town	Uppercross	Tallaght	Dublin South
Greenfields	55	Nethercross	Swords	Balrothery
Greenhills	188	Uppercross	Crumlin	Dublin South
Greenlanes	358	Coolock	Clontarf	Dublin North
Greenmount	8	Coolock	St. George's	Dublin North
Greenoge	217	Newcastle	Rathcoole	Celbridge
Greenwood	111	Coolock	Kinsaley	Balrothery
Hacketstown	170	Balrothery East	Lusk	Balrothery
Hackettsland	44	Rathdown	Killiney	Rathdown
Hampstead North	52	Coolock	Glasnevin	Dublin North
Hampstead South	58	Coolock	Glasnevin	Dublin North
Hampsteadhill	33	Coolock	Glasnevin	Dublin North
Hampton Demesne	365	Balrothery East	Balrothery	Balrothery
Hansfield (or Phibblestown)	223	Castleknock	Clonsilla	Celbridge
Harmonstown	90	Coolock	Clontarf	Dublin North
**Haroldscross**	Town	Uppercross	St. Catherine's	Dublin South
Haroldscross	87	Uppercross and Muni. Borough	St. Catherine's	Dublin South
Haroldscross East	103	Uppercross	St. Peter's	Dublin South
Haroldscross West	148	Uppercross	St. Peter's	Dublin South
Haroldsgrange	341	Rathdown	Whitechurch	Dublin South
Harristown	289	Coolock	St. Margaret's	Dublin North
Hartstown	181	Castleknock	Clonsilla	Celbridge
Haystown	133	Balrothery East	Lusk	Balrothery
Haystown	253	Balrothery East	Balscaddan	Balrothery
Hazardstown	157	Balrothery West	Naul	Balrothery
Hazelbrook	38	Coolock	Portmarnock	Balrothery
Hazelhatch	118	Newcastle	Newcastle	Celbridge
Heathtown	85	Balrothery East	Lusk	Balrothery
Hedgestown	128	Balrothery East	Lusk	Balrothery
Hermitage	139	Newcastle	Esker	Celbridge
Heronstown	108	Coolock	Clontarf	Dublin North
Highdownhill	153	Newcastle	Newcastle	Celbridge
Hilltown	221	Nethercross	Swords	Balrothery
Hollystown	196	Castleknock	Mulhuddart	Dublin North
Hollywood	58	Castleknock	Mulhuddart	Dublin North
Hollywood Great	340	Balrothery West	Hollywood	Balrothery
Hollywood Little	302	Balrothery West	Hollywood	Balrothery
Hollywoodrath	218	Castleknock	Mulhuddart	Dublin North
Holmpatrick	238	Balrothery East	Holmpatrick	Balrothery
Holybanks	17	Nethercross	Swords	Balrothery
Honeypark	62	Rathdown	Monkstown	Rathdown
Horestown	81	Balrothery East	Lusk	Balrothery
**Howth**	Town	Coolock	Howth	Dublin North
Howth	1,188	Coolock	Howth	Dublin North
Howth Demesne	563	Coolock	Howth	Dublin North
Hunststown	193	Coolock	Santry	Dublin North
Hunststown	304	Castleknock	Mulhuddart	Dublin North
Huntstown	299	Castleknock	Castleknock	Dublin North
Hynespark	13	Balrothery East	Balrothery	Balrothery
Hynestown	274	Balrothery West	Naul	Balrothery
Hynestown	291	Newcastle	Newcastle	Celbridge
Inch	175	Balrothery East	Balrothery	Balrothery
Inchicore North	210	Uppercross	St. James'	Dublin South
Inchicore South	154	Uppercross	St. James'	Dublin South
Intake	70	Dublin	Booterstown	Rathdown
Ireland's Eye	53	Coolock	Howth	Dublin North
**Irishtown**	Town	Dublin	Donnybrook	Dublin South
Irishtown	56	Dublin	Donnybrook	Dublin South
Irishtown	172	Balrothery East	Lusk	Balrothery
Irishtown	187	Castleknock	Ward	Dublin North
Irishtown	260	Uppercross	Palmerston	Dublin South
**Islandbridge**	Town	Uppercross	St. James'	Dublin South
Jamestown	40	Nethercross	Swords	Balrothery
Jamestown	64	Rathdown	Tully	Rathdown
Jamestown	92	Uppercross	Cruagh	Dublin South
Jamestown	117	Uppercross	Drimnagh	Dublin South
Jamestown	405	Rathdown	Kilgobbin	Rathdown
Jamestown Great	180	Castleknock	Finglas	Dublin North
Jamestown Little	85	Castleknock	Finglas	Dublin North
Jobstown	420	Uppercross	Tallaght	Dublin South
Johnstown	20	Rathdown	Rathmichael	Rathdown
Johnstown	67	Castleknock	Castleknock	Dublin North
Johnstown	70	Rathdown	Kill	Rathdown
Johnstown	89	Uppercross	Palmerston	Dublin South
Johnstown	96	Castleknock	Finglas	Dublin North
Johnstown	258	Balrothery East	Lusk	Balrothery
Johnstown	316	Newcastle	Rathcoole	Celbridge
Jordanstown	73	Newcastle	Kilmactalway	Celbridge
Jordanstown	92	Balrothery West	Clonmethan	Balrothery
Jordanstown	317	Balrothery West	Palmerston	Balrothery
Jordanstown	493	Balrothery East	Lusk	Balrothery
Keatingspark	194	Newcastle	Rathcoole	Celbridge
Keeloges	217	Newcastle	Newcastle	Celbridge
Kellystown	174	Castleknock	Clonsilla	Celbridge
Kerrymount	143	Rathdown	Tully	Rathdown
Kilbarrack Lower	259	Coolock	Kilbarrack	Dublin North
Kilbarrack Upper	390	Coolock	Kilbarrack	Dublin North
Kilbogget	331	Rathdown	Killiney	Rathdown
Kilbride	266	Newcastle	Kilbride	Celbridge
Kilcarbery	153	Newcastle	Kilbride	Celbridge
Kilcoskan	298	Nethercross	Kilsallaghan	Balrothery
Kilcrea	277	Nethercross	Donabate	Balrothery
Kildonan	163	Castleknock	Finglas	Dublin North
Kilgobbin	440	Rathdown	Kilgobbin	Rathdown
Kill of the Grange	263	Rathdown	Kill	Rathdown
Killakee	661	Uppercross	Cruagh	Dublin South
Killalane	233	Balrothery East	Balrothery	Balrothery
Killamonan	32	Castleknock	Mulhuddart	Dublin North
Killamonan	76	Castleknock	Ward	Dublin North
Killeek	555	Nethercross	Killeek	Balrothery
Killeen	229	Balrothery West	Clonmethan	Balrothery
Killester Demesne	56	Coolock	Clontarf	Dublin North
Killester North	150	Coolock	Killester	Dublin North
Killester South	128	Coolock	Killester	Dublin North
Killinardan	515	Uppercross	Tallaght	Dublin South
**Killiney**	Town	Rathdown	Kill	Rathdown
Killiney	256	Rathdown	Killiney	Rathdown
Killininny	194	Uppercross	Tallaght	Dublin South
Killossery	252	Nethercross	Killossery	Balrothery
Killougher	320	Balrothery East	Balscaddan	Balrothery
Kilmacree	65	Nethercross	Kilsallaghan	Balrothery
Kilmactalway	400	Newcastle	Kilmactalway	Celbridge
Kilmacud East	126	Rathdown	Kilmacud	Rathdown
Kilmacud West	156	Rathdown	Kilmacud	Rathdown
Kilmahuddrick	181	Newcastle	Kilmahuddrick	Dublin South
**Kilmainham**	Town	Uppercross	St. James'	Dublin South
Kilmainham	33	Balrothery East	Balrothery	Balrothery
Kilmainham	38	Uppercross	St. James'	Dublin South
Kilmartin	615	Castleknock	Mulhuddart	Dublin North
Kilmashogue	1,409	Rathdown	Whitechurch	Dublin South
Kilmore Big	359	Coolock	Coolock	Dublin North
Kilmore Little	41	Coolock	Coolock	Dublin North
Kilnamanagh	621	Uppercross	Tallaght	Dublin South
Kilreesk	262	Nethercross	Finglas	Balrothery
Kilsallaghan	353	Nethercross	Kilsallaghan	Balrothery
Kilshane	472	Castleknock	Finglas	Dublin North
Kilsough	65	Balrothery East	Balrothery	Balrothery
Kiltalown	277	Uppercross	Tallaght	Dublin South
Kiltiernan	354	Rathdown	Kiltiernan	Rathdown
Kiltiernan Domain	150	Rathdown	Kiltiernan	Rathdown
Kiltipper	193	Uppercross	Tallaght	Dublin South
Kimmage	106	Uppercross	Crumlin	Dublin South
Kimmage	293	Rathdown	Rathfarnham	Dublin South
Kingston	59	Rathdown	Kiltiernan	Rathdown
Kingston	92	Rathdown	Tully	Rathdown
**Kingstown**	Town	Rathdown	Monkstown	Rathdown
Kingstown	50	Balrothery East	Lusk	Balrothery
Kingstown	194	Coolock	St. Margaret's	Dublin North
Kingstown	194	Rathdown	Taney	Rathdown
Kingswood	35	Uppercross	Clondalkin	Dublin South
Kingswood (or Garraustown)	122	Uppercross	Tallaght	Dublin South
Kinoud	150	Balrothery West	Hollywood	Balrothery
Kinsaley	713	Coolock	Kinsaley	Balrothery
Kishoge	273	Newcastle	Esker	Celbridge
Kitchenstown	196	Balrothery West	Hollywood	Balrothery
Knightstown	184	Balrothery East	Lusk	Balrothery
Knock	183	Balrothery East	Balrothery	Balrothery
Knockaneek	120	Balrothery West	Ballymadun	Dunshaughlin
Knockbrack	30	Balrothery West	Hollywood	Balrothery
Knocklyon	429	Uppercross	Tallaght	Dublin South
Knockmitten	176	Uppercross	Clondalkin	Dublin South
Knocknagin	251	Balrothery East	Balrothery	Balrothery
Knocksedan	98	Nethercross	Swords	Balrothery
Lamb Island	1	Rathdown	Dalkey	Rathdown
Lambay Island	595	Nethercross	Portraine	Balrothery
Lane	28	Balrothery East	Lusk	Balrothery
Lane	115	Balrothery East	Holmpatrick	Balrothery
Lanestown	480	Nethercross	Donabate	Balrothery
Lansville	46	Rathdown	Monkstown	Rathdown
Laraghcon	295	Newcastle	Leixlip	Celbridge
Larkfield	13	Uppercross	Crumlin	Dublin South
Laughanstown	382	Rathdown	Tully	Rathdown
Laurestown	207	Nethercross	Finglas	Balrothery
Laytown	136	Balrothery East	Baldongan	Balrothery
Leas	140	Nethercross	Killossery	Balrothery
Leastown	274	Balrothery West	Westpalstown	Balrothery
Leckclintown	214	Balrothery West	Naul	Balrothery
Leopardstown and Carmanhall	277	Rathdown	Tully	Rathdown
Liffeybank	4	Dublin, Muni. Borough of	St. James'	Dublin North
Limekilnfarm	102	Uppercross	Crumlin	Dublin South
Lispopple	611	Nethercross	Killossery	Balrothery
Lissenhall Great	260	Nethercross	Swords	Balrothery
Lissenhall Little	326	Nethercross	Swords	Balrothery
**Little Bray**	Town	Rathdown	Oldconnaught	Rathdown
Little Bray	33	Rathdown	Oldconnaught	Rathdown
Littlepace	97	Castleknock	Mulhuddart	Dublin North
Longmeadows	45	Castleknock	St. James'	Dublin North
**Loughshinny**	Town	Balrothery East	Lusk	Balrothery
Lough Common	10	Balrothery East	Lusk	Balrothery
Loughbarn	128	Balrothery East	Balrothery	Balrothery
Loughland	41	Balrothery East	Lusk	Balrothery
Loughlinstown	422	Rathdown	Killiney	Rathdown
Loughlinstown Commons	8	Rathdown	Killiney	Rathdown
Loughlinstown Commons	19	Rathdown	Rathmichael	Rathdown
Loughmain	119	Balrothery West	Naul	Balrothery
Loughshinny	98	Balrothery East	Lusk	Balrothery
Loughtown Lower	166	Newcastle	Kilmactalway	Celbridge
Loughtown Upper	94	Newcastle	Kilmactalway	Celbridge
Lovescharity	24	Dublin, Muni. Borough of	St. George's	Dublin North
**Lucan**	Town	Newcastle	Lucan	Celbridge
Lucan & Pettycanon	152	Newcastle	Lucan	Celbridge
Lucan Demesne	152	Newcastle	Lucan	Celbridge
Lugg	315	Newcastle	Saggart	Celbridge
Lugmore	122	Uppercross	Tallaght	Dublin South
Lusk	701	Balrothery East	Lusk	Balrothery
**Lusk**	Town	Balrothery East	Lusk	Balrothery
Lyons	120	Newcastle	Newcastle	Celbridge
Mabestown	44	Coolock	Kinsaley	Balrothery
Macetown Middle	93	Castleknock	Mulhuddart	Dublin North
Macetown North	48	Castleknock	Mulhuddart	Dublin North
Macetown South	41	Castleknock	Mulhuddart	Dublin North
Magillstown	325	Nethercross	Swords	Balrothery
Maiden Rock	1	Rathdown	Dalkey	Rathdown
Mainscourt	377	Balrothery West	Ballyboghil	Balrothery
**Malahide**	Town	Coolock	Malahide	Balrothery
Malahide	503	Coolock	Malahide	Balrothery
Malahide Demesne	215	Coolock	Malahide	Balrothery
Malheney	102	Balrothery East	Balrothery	Balrothery
Mallabow	601	Balrothery West	Hollywood	Balrothery
Mantua	22	Nethercross	Swords	Balrothery
Margaretstown	73	Balrothery East	Balrothery	Balrothery
**Marino**	Town	Coolock	Clontarf	Dublin North
Marino	218	Coolock	Clonturk	Dublin North
Marshallstown	120	Nethercross	Swords	Balrothery
Maryville	118	Coolock	Raheny	Dublin North
Matt	153	Balrothery East	Balscaddan	Balrothery
Maynetown	235	Coolock	Baldoyle	Dublin North
Meakstown	174	Coolock	Santry	Dublin North
**Merrion**	Town	Dublin	Donnybrook	Dublin South
Merrion	197	Dublin	Donnybrook	Dublin South
Merrion	197	Rathdown	Booterstown	Rathdown
Merryfalls	133	Coolock	St. Margaret's	Dublin North
Middletown	148	Coolock	Cloghran	Balrothery
Milestown	96	Balrothery East	Balscaddan	Balrothery
Millhead	64	Coolock	St. Margaret's	Dublin North
**Milltown**	Town	Uppercross	St. Peter's	Dublin South
Milltown	185	Uppercross	St. Peter's	Dublin South
Milltown	496	Newcastle	Kilmactalway	Celbridge
Miltonsfields	82	Nethercross	Swords	Balrothery
Milverton	92	Balrothery East	Baldongan	Balrothery
Milverton	277	Balrothery East	Holmpatrick	Balrothery
Milverton Demesne	136	Balrothery East	Holmpatrick	Balrothery
Mitchelstown	154	Castleknock	Castleknock	Dublin North
Moneenalion Commons Lower	55	Newcastle	Saggart	Celbridge
Moneenalion Commons Upper	73	Newcastle	Saggart	Celbridge
Moneyatta Commons	19	Newcastle	Saggart	Celbridge
Monkstown	212	Rathdown	Monkstown	Rathdown
Monkstown Castlefarm	33	Rathdown	Monkstown	Rathdown
Monkstown Housefarm	22	Rathdown	Monkstown	Rathdown
Monpelier	23	Rathdown	Monkstown	Rathdown
Mooreenaruggan	21	Uppercross	Clondalkin	Dublin South
Mooretown	71	Castleknock	Mulhuddart	Dublin North
Mooretown	309	Nethercross	Swords	Balrothery
Moortown	291	Balrothery West	Clonmethan	Balrothery
Mount Mapas (or Scalpwilliam)	146	Rathdown	Kill	Rathdown
Mountambrose Great	49	Nethercross	Killeek	Balrothery
Mountambrose Little	31	Nethercross	Killeek	Balrothery
Mountanville	92	Rathdown	Taney	Rathdown
Mountashton	72	Rathdown	Monkstown	Rathdown
Mountgorry	119	Nethercross	Swords	Balrothery
Mountjerome	28	Uppercross	St. Catherine's	Dublin South
Mountmerrion (or Callary)	376	Rathdown	Taney	Rathdown
Mountmerrion South	4	Rathdown	Taney	Rathdown
Mountolive	40	Coolock	Raheny	Dublin North
Mountpelier	919	Uppercross	Tallaght	Dublin South
Mountseskin	715	Uppercross	Tallaght	Dublin South
Mountstuart	68	Nethercross	Killossery	Balrothery
Muglins	1	Rathdown	Dalkey	Rathdown
Mulchanstown	47	Rathdown	Kill	Rathdown
Mullan	4	Nethercross	Donabate	Balrothery
Mullauns	20	Newcastle	Kilmactalway	Celbridge
Murphystown	406	Rathdown	Tully	Rathdown
Murragh	327	Balrothery West	Westpalstown	Balrothery
Nangor	171	Uppercross	Clondalkin	Dublin South
**Naul**	Town	Balrothery West	Naul	Balrothery
Naul	376	Balrothery West	Naul	Balrothery
Neillstown	146	Uppercross	Clondalkin	Dublin South
Nevinstown East	138	Nethercross	Swords	Balrothery
Nevinstown West	33	Nethercross	Swords	Balrothery
Nevitt	351	Balrothery East	Lusk	Balrothery
Newbarn	374	Nethercross	Kilsallaghan	Balrothery
Newbridge Demesne	349	Nethercross	Donabate	Balrothery
Newbrook	53	Coolock	Coolock	Dublin North
**Newcastle**	Town	Newcastle	Newcastle	Celbridge
Newcastle Demesne	136	Newcastle	Newcastle	Celbridge
Newcastle Farm	280	Newcastle	Newcastle	Celbridge
Newcastle North	151	Newcastle	Newcastle	Celbridge
Newcastle South	183	Newcastle	Newcastle	Celbridge
Newhaggard	119	Balrothery West	Garristown	Dunshaughlin
Newhaggard	363	Balrothery East	Lusk	Balrothery
Newlands	56	Uppercross	Clondalkin	Dublin South
Newlands Demesne	55	Uppercross	Clondalkin	Dublin South
Newlands Demesne	70	Uppercross	Tallaght	Dublin South
Newpark	121	Rathdown	Kill	Rathdown
Newpark	351	Castleknock	Ward	Dublin North
Newtown	199	Coolock	Coolock	Dublin North
Newtown	230	Rathdown	Kiltiernan	Rathdown
Newtown	232	Nethercross	Swords	Balrothery
Newtown	247	Balrothery East	Balscaddan	Balrothery
Newtown	309	Balrothery West	Westpalstown	Balrothery
Newtown	340	Coolock	St. Margaret's	Dublin North
Newtown	450	Uppercross	Cruagh	Dublin South
Newtown	741	Balrothery West	Garristown	Dunshaughlin
Newtown Blackrock	3	Dublin	Monkstown	Rathdown
Newtown Blackrock	127	Rathdown	Monkstown	Rathdown
Newtown Castlebyrn	84	Rathdown	Monkstown	Rathdown
Newtown Little	107	Rathdown	Kilgobbin	Rathdown
Newtown Little	178	Rathdown	Rathfarnham	Dublin South
Newtown Lower	132	Newcastle	Saggart	Celbridge
**Newtown Park**	Town	Rathdown	Stillorgan	Rathdown
Newtown Upper	319	Newcastle	Saggart	Celbridge
Newtowncorduff	263	Balrothery East	Lusk	Balrothery
Newtownpark	20	Rathdown	Kill	Rathdown
North Bull (or The Island)	120	Coolock	Clontarf	Dublin North
North Bull Islands	6	Coolock	Raheny	Dublin North
Nutstown	759	Balrothery West	Ballymadun	Dunshaughlin
Oberstown	281	Balrothery East	Lusk	Balrothery
Oldbawn	615	Uppercross	Tallaght	Dublin South
Oldconnaught	726	Rathdown	Oldconnaught	Rathdown
Oldcourt	435	Uppercross	Tallaght	Dublin South
Oldorchard	123	Rathdown	Rathfarnham	Dublin South
**Oldtown**	Town	Balrothery West	Clonmethan	Balrothery
Oldtown	43	Coolock	Coolock	Dublin North
Oldtown	74	Coolock	Artaine	Dublin North
Oldtown	165	Nethercross	Swords	Balrothery
Oldtown	358	Balrothery West	Clonmethan	Balrothery
Orlagh	43	Uppercross	Cruagh	Dublin South
Outlands	79	Nethercross	Swords	Balrothery
Owenstown (or Trimleston)	75	Rathdown	Taney	Rathdown
**Palmerston**	Town	Uppercross	Palmerston	Dublin South
Palmerston Lower	263	Uppercross	Palmerston	Dublin South
Palmerston Upper	204	Uppercross	Palmerston	Dublin South
Palmerstown	249	Balrothery East	Balrothery	Balrothery
Palmerstown	558	Balrothery West	Palmerstown	Balrothery
Parnelstown	167	Balrothery East	Lusk	Balrothery
Parslickstown	202	Castleknock	Mulhuddart	Dublin North
Passifyoucan	88	Newcastle	Leixlip	Celbridge
Peamount	88	Newcastle	Newcastle	Celbridge
Pelletstown	259	Castleknock	Castleknock	Dublin North
Perrystown	93	Uppercross	Crumlin	Dublin South
Pettycanon and Lucan	259	Newcastle	Lucan	Celbridge
Phibblestown (or Hansfield)	223	Castleknock	Clonsilla	Celbridge
Phrompstown	199	Rathdown	Oldconnaught	Rathdown
Pickardstown	184	Coolock	St. Margaret's	Dublin North
Piercetown	36	Balrothery East	Lusk	Balrothery
Piercetown	41	Balrothery East	Holmpatrick	Balrothery
Piperstown	381	Uppercross	Tallaght	Dublin South
Pluckhimin	131	Balrothery West	Garristown	Dunshaughlin
**Ponds**	Town	Rathdown	Rathfarnham	Dublin South
Popeshall	70	Balrothery East	Lusk	Balrothery
Poppintree	16	Castleknock	Finglas	Dublin North
Poppintree	118	Coolock	Santry	Dublin North
Porterstown	219	Castleknock	Castleknock	Dublin North
Portmarnock	386	Coolock	Portmarnock	Balrothery
Portmellick	108	Coolock	St. Margaret's	Dublin North
Portobello	107	Uppercross and Muni. Borough	St. Peter's	Dublin South
Portraine	110	Nethercross	Portraine	Balrothery
Portraine Demesne	229	Nethercross	Donabate	Balrothery
Portraine Demesne	241	Nethercross	Portraine	Balrothery
Powerstown	358	Castleknock	Mulhuddart	Dublin North
Priest Town	64	Uppercross	Clondalkin	Dublin South
Priesthouse	277	Rathdown	Donnybrook	Dublin South
Priorland	45	Balrothery East	Balscaddan	Balrothery
Priorswood	68	Coolock	Coolock	Dublin North
Prospect	9	Coolock	St. George's	Dublin North
Prospect	42	Coolock	Glasnevin	Dublin North
Puckstown	123	Coolock	Artaine	Dublin North
Quarry	33	Coolock	Howth	Dublin North
Quarryvale	53	Uppercross	Palmerstown	Dublin South
Quay	62	Nethercross	Portraine	Balrothery
Racecourse Common	121	Balrothery East	Lusk	Balrothery
Raheen	94	Uppercross	Clondalkin	Dublin South
Raheen	328	Newcastle	Saggart	Celbridge
**Raheny**	Town	Coolock	Raheny	Dublin North
Raheny	166	Balrothery East	Lusk	Balrothery
Raheny North	95	Coolock	Raheny	Dublin North
Raheny North	130	Coolock	Raheny	Dublin North
Rahillion	100	Nethercross	Portraine	Balrothery
Rahulk	135	Coolock	Kinsaley	Balrothery
Rallekaystown	173	Balrothery East	Lusk	Balrothery
**Ranelagh**	Town	Uppercross	St. Peter's	Dublin South
Ranelagh North	121	Uppercross and Muni. Borough	St. Peter's	Dublin South
Ranelagh South	53	Uppercross	St. Peter's	Dublin South
Rath	166	Balrothery East	Balscaddan	Balrothery
Rath	187	Nethercross	Killossery	Balrothery
Rath Great	193	Balrothery West	Naul	Balrothery
Rath Little	140	Balrothery West	Naul	Balrothery
Rathartan	105	Balrothery East	Lusk	Balrothery
Rathbeal	554	Nethercross	Swords	Balrothery
**Rathcoole**	Town	Newcastle	Rathcoole	Celbridge
Rathcoole	417	Newcastle	Rathcoole	Celbridge
Rathcreedan	274	Newcastle	Rathcoole	Celbridge
**Rathfarnham**	Town	Rathdown	Rathfarnham	Dublin South
Rathfarnham	603	Rathdown	Rathfarnham	Dublin South
Rathgar	304	Rathdown	Rathfarnham	Dublin South
Rathingle	113	Nethercross	Swords	Balrothery
Rathland East	40	Uppercross	St. Catherine's	Dublin South
Rathland West	37	Uppercross	St. Catherine's	Dublin South
Rathmichael	409	Rathdown	Rathmichael	Rathdown
**Rathmines**	Town	Uppercross	St. Peter's	Dublin South
Rathmines East	117	Uppercross	St. Peter's	Dublin South
Rathmines Great	88	Rathdown	Taney	Rathdown
Rathmines Little	68	Rathdown	Taney	Rathdown
Rathmines South	194	Uppercross	St. Peter's	Dublin South
Rathmines West	102	Uppercross	St. Peter's	Dublin South
Rathmooney	413	Balrothery East	Lusk	Balrothery
Ravenswell	47	Rathdown	Oldconnaught	Rathdown
Redcow	141	Uppercross	Clondalkin	Dublin South
Redcowfarm	183	Uppercross	Palmerston	Dublin South
Redgap	175	Newcastle	Rathcoole	Celbridge
Regeens	109	Balrothery East	Lusk	Balrothery
Regles	229	Balrothery East	Lusk	Balrothery
Reynoldstown	128	Balrothery West	Naul	Balrothery
Richardstown	474	Balrothery East	Lusk	Balrothery
**Richmond**	Town	Coolock	Clonturk	Dublin North
Richmond	110	Coolock	Clonturk	Dublin North
Ring	244	Balrothery East	Balscaddan	Balrothery
Ring Commons	180	Balrothery East	Balscaddan	Balrothery
Ring Commons (1st Division)	24	Balrothery West	Hollywood	Balrothery
Ring Commons (2nd Division)	8	Balrothery West	Hollywood	Balrothery
Ringsend	53	Dublin	Donnybrook	Dublin South
Ringwood	95	Newcastle	Newcastle	Celbridge
Robinhood	77	Uppercross	Drimnagh	Dublin South
Robswalls	191	Coolock	Portmarnock	Balrothery
Rocheshill	122	Rathdown	Kill	Rathdown
Rochestown	95	Rathdown	Kill	Rathdown
Rochestown Domain	113	Rathdown	Kill	Rathdown
Rock	12	Coolock	Santry	Dublin North
Rockfield	79	Rathdown	Monkstown	Rathdown
Roebuck	6	Dublin	Taney	Rathdown
Roebuck	35	Uppercross	Crumlin	Dublin South
Roebuck	814	Rathdown	Taney	Rathdown
Roganstown	178	Nethercross	Swords	Balrothery
Rogerstown	345	Balrothery East	Lusk	Balrothery
Ronanstown	91	Uppercross	Clondalkin	Dublin South
Roscall	238	Balrothery West	Ballyboghil	Balrothery
Rosepark	8	Balrothery East	Balrothery	Balrothery
**Round Town**	Town	Rathdown	Rathfarnham	Dublin South
Rowans Big	252	Balrothery East	Lusk	Balrothery
Rowans Little	156	Balrothery East	Lusk	Balrothery
Rowlagh	102	Uppercross	Esker	Dublin South
Rowlestown East	121	Nethercross	Killossery	Balrothery
Rowlestown West	217	Nethercross	Killossery	Balrothery
**Rush**	Town	Balrothery East	Lusk	Balrothery
Rush	1,171	Balrothery East	Lusk	Balrothery
Rush Demesne	452	Balrothery East	Lusk	Balrothery
**Saggart**	Town	Newcastle	Saggart	Celbridge
Saggart	576	Newcastle	Saggart	Celbridge
Saintdoolaghs	202	Coolock	Balgriffin	Dublin North
Sainthelens	192	Coolock	Portmarnock	Balrothery
Saintlaurence	200	Uppercross	Palmerston	Dublin South
**Sally Noggins** (or **Glenagarey**)	Town	Rathdown	Monkstown	Rathdown
Sallymount	10	Uppercross	Donnybrook	Dublin South
Salmon	251	Balrothery East	Balrothery	Balrothery
Sandyhill	173	Coolock	St. Margaret's	Dublin North
**Sandymount**	Town	Dublin	Donnybrook	Dublin South
Sandymount	242	Dublin	Donnybrook	Dublin South
**Santry**	Town	Coolock	Santry	Dublin North
Santry	26	Coolock	Coolock	Dublin North
Santry	631	Coolock	Santry	Dublin North
Santry Demesne	273	Coolock	Santry	Dublin North
Saucerstown	211	Nethercross	Swords	Balrothery
Scalpwilliam (or Mount Mapas)	146	Rathdown	Kill	Rathdown
Scatternagh	171	Nethercross	Killossery	Balrothery
Scholarstown	200	Uppercross	Rathfarnham	Dublin South
Scribblestown	272	Castleknock	Castleknock	Dublin North
**Seafield Avenue**	Town	Coolock	Clontarf	Dublin North
Seapoint	33	Nethercross	Swords	Balrothery
Seapoint (or Templehill)	52	Rathdown	Monkstown	Rathdown
Seatown East	225	Nethercross	Swords	Balrothery
Seatown West	92	Nethercross	Swords	Balrothery
Sevenparks (1st Division)	4	Balrothery East	Balscaddan	Balrothery
Sevenparks (2nd Division)	4	Balrothery East	Balscaddan	Balrothery
Sevenparks (3rd Division)	1	Balrothery East	Balscaddan	Balrothery
Shallon	56	Castleknock	Finglas	Dublin North
Shallon	152	Nethercross	Kilsallaghan	Balrothery
Shanganagh	702	Rathdown	Rathmichael	Rathdown
Shanganhill	137	Coolock	St. Margaret's	Dublin North
Shankill	1,182	Rathdown	Rathmichael	Rathdown
Sheephill	349	Castleknock	Castleknock	Dublin North
Sheepmoor	161	Castleknock	Clonsilla	Celbridge
Shenick's Island	15	Balrothery East	Holmpatrick	Balrothery
Shrubs	79	Coolock	Coolock	Dublin North
Sibylhill	77	Coolock	Clontarf	Dublin North
Silloge	215	Coolock	Santry	Dublin North
Simmonscourt	81	Rathdown	Donnybrook	Dublin South
Skeagh	122	Newcastle	Newcastle	Celbridge
Skephubble	135	Nethercross	Finglas	Balrothery
**Skerries**	Town	Balrothery East	Holmpatrick	Balrothery
Skidoo	658	Nethercross	Swords	Balrothery
Slade	142	Newcastle	Saggart	Celbridge
Slademore	101	Newcastle	Rathcoole	Celbridge
Slievethoul	403	Newcastle	Rathcoole	Celbridge
Slutsend (or West Farm)	125	Coolock and Muni. Borough	Glasnevin	Dublin North
Smotscourt	277	Dublin	Donnybrook	Dublin South
Snug	60	Coolock	Raheny	Dublin North
Snugborough	53	Castleknock	Castleknock	Dublin North
Snugborough	102	Coolock	Balgriffin	Dublin North
South Lots	31	Dublin	St. Mark's	Dublin South
Spricklestown	122	Castleknock	Ward	Dublin North
Springhill	64	Coolock	Cloghran	Balrothery
Springmount	131	Castleknock	Finglas	Dublin North
St Catherines Park	195	Newcastle	Leixlip	Celbridge
St Edmondsbury	71	Newcastle	Lucan	Celbridge
St Edmondsbury	129	Newcastle	Esker	Celbridge
St Margarets	150	Coolock	St. Margaret's	Dublin North
St Patricks Island	15	Balrothery East	Holmpatrick	Balrothery
**St. Doolaghs**	Town	Coolock	Balgriffin	Dublin North
St. James' (part of Phoenix Park)	499	Castleknock	St. James'	Dublin North
Stackstown	175	Rathdown	Whitechurch	Dublin South
Staffordstown	105	Balrothery East	Lusk	Balrothery
Staffordstown Turvey	134	Balrothery East	Lusk	Balrothery
Stamullin	109	Balrothery East	Balscaddan	Balrothery
Stang	41	Castleknock	Finglas	Dublin North
Stannaway	162	Uppercross	Crumlin	Dublin South
Stapolin	245	Coolock	Baldoyle	Dublin North
Steelstown	152	Newcastle	Newcastle	Celbridge
**Stepaside**	Town	Rathdown	Kilgobbin	Rathdown
Stephenstown	310	Balrothery East	Balrothery	Balrothery
**Stillorgan**	Town	Rathdown	Stillorgan	Rathdown
Stillorgan Grove	148	Rathdown	Stillorgan	Rathdown
Stillorgan North	63	Rathdown	Stillorgan	Rathdown
Stillorgan Park	182	Rathdown	Stillorgan	Rathdown
Stillorgan South	73	Rathdown	Stillorgan	Rathdown
Stockens	49	Castleknock	Finglas	Dublin North
Stockhole	225	Coolock	Cloghran	Balrothery
Stormanstown	248	Coolock	Santry	Dublin North
Stradbrook	33	Rathdown	Monkstown	Rathdown
**Strandville Avenue**	Town	Coolock	Clontarf	Dublin North
Streamstown	67	Coolock	Kinsaley	Balrothery
Strifeland	138	Balrothery East	Holmpatrick	Balrothery
Surgalstown North	224	Nethercross	Killossery	Balrothery
Surgalstown South	203	Nethercross	Killossery	Balrothery
Sutton North	116	Coolock	Howth	Dublin North
Sutton South	352	Coolock	Howth	Dublin North
Swansnest	89	Coolock	Kilbarrack	Dublin North
**Swords**	Town	Nethercross	Swords	Balrothery
Swords Demesne	114	Nethercross	Swords	Balrothery
Swords Glebe	9	Nethercross	Swords	Balrothery
**Tallaght**	Town	Uppercross	Tallaght	Dublin South
Tallaght	1,952	Uppercross	Tallaght	Dublin South
Tankardstwon	203	Balrothery East	Balrothery	Balrothery
Taylorsgrange	451	Rathdown	Whitechurch	Dublin South
Templehill (or Seapoint)	52	Rathdown	Monkstown	Rathdown
Templeogue	671	Uppercross	Tallaght	Dublin South
Terenure	569	Rathdown	Rathfarnham	Dublin South
The Island (or North Bull)	120	Coolock	Clontarf	Dublin North
Thomastown	159	Balrothery East	Lusk	Balrothery
Thomastown	213	Rathdown	Monkstown	Rathdown
Thomondtown	163	Balrothery East	Lusk	Balrothery
Thorntown	268	Nethercross	Kilsallaghan	Balrothery
Thulla Island	1	Coolock	Howth	Dublin North
Tibradden	842	Uppercross	Cruagh	Dublin South
Tiknick	204	Rathdown	Tully	Rathdown
Tiknock	627	Rathdown	Taney	Rathdown
Tipperstown	119	Rathdown	Kill	Rathdown
Tobeen	234	Balrothery West	Garristown	Dunshaughlin
Toberbunny	156	Coolock	Cloghran	Balrothery
Toberburr	220	Nethercross	Finglas	Balrothery
Tobergregan	626	Balrothery West	Garristown	Dunshaughlin
Tobermaclugg	85	Newcastle	Lucan	Celbridge
Tobersool	223	Balrothery East	Balscaddan	Balrothery
Tobertaskin	67	Balrothery East	Balscaddan	Balrothery
Tobertown	365	Balrothery East	Balscaddan	Balrothery
**Tolka**	Town	Castleknock	Finglas	Dublin North
Tolka	213	Castleknock	Finglas	Dublin North
Tolka Park	37	Coolock	Glasnevin	Dublin North
Tonguefield	4	Uppercross	Crumlin	Dublin South
Tonlegee	80	Nethercross	Swords	Balrothery
Tonlegee	242	Coolock	Coolock	Dublin North
Tooman	231	Balrothery East	Lusk	Balrothery
Tootenhill	215	Newcastle	Rathcoole	Celbridge
Townparks	104	Nethercross	Swords	Balrothery
Townparks	545	Balrothery East	Holmpatrick	Balrothery
Trimleston (or Owenstown)	75	Rathdown	Taney	Rathdown
Turkinstown	82	Balrothery East	Balrothery	Balrothery
Turnapin Great	206	Coolock	Santry	Dublin North
Turnapin Little	78	Coolock	Santry	Dublin North
Turvey	273	Balrothery East	Lusk	Balrothery
Turvey	312	Nethercross	Donabate	Balrothery
Tymon North	105	Uppercross	Tallaght	Dublin South
Tymon North	483	Uppercross	Tallaght	Dublin South
Tyrrellstown	427	Castleknock	Mulhuddart	Dublin North
Tyrrellstown Big	282	Balrothery East	Lusk	Balrothery
Tyrrellstown Little	254	Balrothery East	Lusk	Balrothery
Violethill Great	50	Coolock	Glasnevin	Dublin North
Violethill Little	33	Coolock	Glasnevin	Dublin North
Wad	93	Coolock	Glasnevin	Dublin North
Walnutgrove	38	Coolock	Glasnevin	Dublin North
Walshestown	427	Balrothery East	Lusk	Balrothery
Waltersland	37	Rathdown	Stillorgan	Rathdown
Warblestown	31	Nethercross	Killossery	Balrothery
Ward Lower	285	Castleknock	Ward	Dublin North
Ward Upper	212	Castleknock	Ward	Dublin North
West Farm (or Slutsend)	125	Coolock and Muni. Borough	Glasnevin	Dublin North
Westercave	1	Nethercross	Finglas	Balrothery
Westercave	170	Nethercross	Killeek	Balrothery
Westmanstown	101	Newcastle	Rathcoole	Celbridge
Westmanstown	437	Newcastle	Leixlip	Celbridge
Westown	525	Balrothery West	Naul	Balrothery
Westpalstown	273	Balrothery West	Westpalstown	Balrothery
Whitechurch	60	Rathdown	Whitechurch	Dublin South
Whitehall	122	Uppercross	Tallaght	Dublin South
Whitehall	128	Uppercross	Crumlin	Dublin South
Whitehall	189	Rathdown	Rathfarnham	Dublin South
Whitestown	228	Balrothery West	Palmerstown	Balrothery
Whitestown	240	Uppercross	Tallaght	Dublin South
Whitestown	241	Balrothery East	Balscaddan	Balrothery
Whitestown	264	Balrothery East	Lusk	Balrothery
Wilkinstown	148	Uppercross	Crumlin	Dublin South
**Willbrook**	Town	Rathdown	Rathfarnham	Dublin South
Willbrook	58	Rathdown	Rathfarnham	Dublin South
**Williamstown**	Town	Rathdown	Booterstown	Rathdown
**Williamstown**	Town	Dublin	Booterstown	Rathdown
Williamstown	114	Rathdown	Booterstown	Rathdown
Willsborough	46	Coolock	Coolock	Dublin North
Wimbletown	367	Balrothery East	Lusk	Balrothery
Windmill Lands	159	Nethercross	Swords	Balrothery
Windmillhill	155	Newcastle	Newcastle	Celbridge
**Windy Harbour**	Town	Rathdown	Taney	Rathdown
Winnings	59	Balrothery West	Naul	Balrothery
Wolganstown	17	Balrothery West	Palmerstown	Balrothery
Wolganstown	224	Balrothery West	Clonmethan	Balrothery
Woodfarm	64	Uppercross	Palmerston	Dublin South
Woodland	101	Rathdown	Stillorgan	Rathdown
Woodlands	571	Castleknock	Clonsilla	Celbridge
Woodpark	171	Rathdown	Kill	Rathdown
Woodside	154	Rathdown	Kilgobbin	Rathdown
Woodtown	488	Uppercross	Cruagh	Dublin South
Woodville	124	Newcastle	Esker	Celbridge
Wyanstown	439	Balrothery West	Clonmethan	Balrothery
Wyestown	382	Balrothery West	Ballymadun	Dunshaughlin
Yellow Walls	51	Uppercross	Palmerston	Dublin South
Yellow Walls	137	Castleknock	Mulhuddart	Dublin North
Yellow Walls	405	Coolock	Malahide	Balrothery
Yellowmeadows	65	Uppercross	Clondalkin	Dublin South
