= R102 road (Ireland) =

Road in Ireland

R102 road
- Bóthar R102
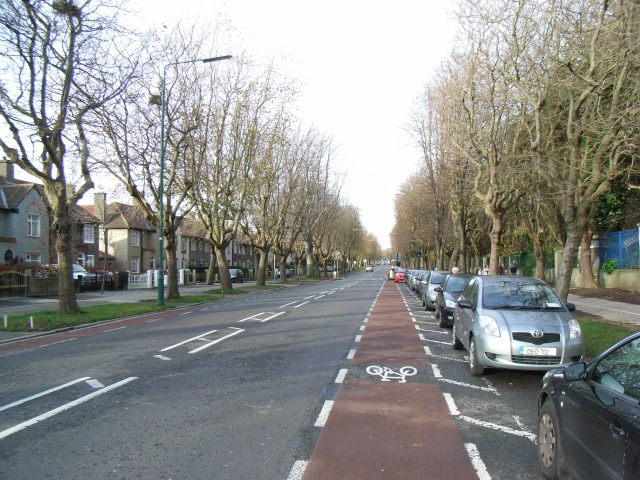
- Griffith Avenue, Marino, on the R102

Route information
- Length: 10.8 km (6.7 mi)

Location
- Country: Ireland
- Primary destinations: PART 1: Fingal; Starts at N3 near M50 motorway; Crosses railway tracks; Crosses the Royal Canal; Closely follows the River Tolka; Dunsink; Ashtown Road / Scribblestown Road; Dublin City; Follows north border of Tolka Valley Park; R135 (Finglas Road, south Finglas); PART 2: R108 road (St. Mobhi / Ballymun Road); R132 (Upr. Drumcondra / Swords Road); Dublin Port Tunnel (no access); R107 road (Malahide Road)

Highway system
- Roads in Ireland; Motorways; Primary; Secondary; Regional

The R102 road is a regional road in Dublin, Ireland, which describes a broad arc across the north of the city, connecting the N3 (Navan Road) — at its M50 motorway intersection — to the R107 (Malahide Road) on the other side of the city. The road is 10.8 kilometres (6.7 mi) long.

== Route ==
=== First section ===
The first section of the route starts from the N3 and closely follows the River Tolka through Dunsink, Scribblestown, and Ashtown. It then hugs the border of Tolka Valley Park until it reaches the R135 in southern Finglas.

The R102 resumes after the traveller has gone 230 metres south on the R135 (Finglas Road) to join the second section of the route.

=== Second section ===
The second section begins heading east on the Old Finglas Road. A brief 200 metres swing to the north along Tolka Estate and a turn to the east takes the road to Griffith Avenue. The R102 stays on Griffith Avenue, passing through southern Glasnevin, Marino and touching Fairview and Clontarf until its terminal junction at the R107 (Malahide Road) (the line of the road is continued by a small road leading to the Howth Road). Along the way, it crosses the R108 (St. Mobhi Road/Ballymun Road), the R132 (Upper Drumcondra Road/Swords Road), and crosses over the Dublin Port Tunnel.

=== Official description of the R102 from the Roads Act 1993 (Classification of Regional Roads) Order 2012 ===
The Official description of the R102 from the Roads Act 1993 (Classification of Regional Roads) Order 2012 reads as the following:

R102: Blanchardstown - Malahide Road, Dublin

Between its junction with N3 at Blanchardstown Bypass in the county of Fingal and its junction with R135 at Finglas Road in the city of Dublin via Dunsink Lane and River Road in the county of Fingal: River Road, Ratoath Road and Tolka Valley Road in the city of Dublin

and

between its junction with R135 at Finglas Road and its junction with R107 at Malahide Road via Old Finglas Road, Tolka Estate Road, Griffith Avenue Extension and Griffith Avenue all in the city of Dublin.

== See also ==
- Roads in Ireland
- National primary road
- National secondary road
- Regional road
