= N2 road (Ireland) =

National primary road in Ireland

N2 road
- Bóthar N2

Route information
- Length: 133.01 km (82.65 mi)

Location
- Country: Ireland
- Primary destinations: (bypassed routes in italics): Fingal; St Margaret's; Ward, Castleknock; County Meath; Ashbourne; Kilmoon Cross; Rathfeigh Cross; Balrath Cross; Slane; County Louth; Collon; Ardee; County Monaghan; Carrickmacross; Castleblayney; Monaghan; Emyvale

Highway system
- Roads in Ireland; Motorways; Primary; Secondary; Regional

The N2 road is a national primary road in Ireland, running from Dublin to the border with Northern Ireland at Moy Bridge near Aughnacloy, County Tyrone to connect Dublin with Derry and Letterkenny via the A5. A section of the route near Dublin forms the M2 motorway.

== Route ==
The N2 commences at junction 5 of the M50 motorway. It then runs as a dual-carriageway for 17 km (10.5 miles) from the M50 to north of Ashbourne, County Meath. This project was opened on 25 May 2006, and includes 3.5 km (2.2 miles) of three lane dual carriageway built to motorway standard. The route is the first to have a 120 km/h (75 mph) special speed limit. According to the project engineers, the National Roads Authority decided due to the lack of available space at the M50 junction to accommodate a parallel joining non-motorway route that they would designate the new road as high-quality dual carriageway and block off the existing road from the M50. 13 km (8.1 miles) of this dual carriageway stretch became motorway on 28 August 2009.

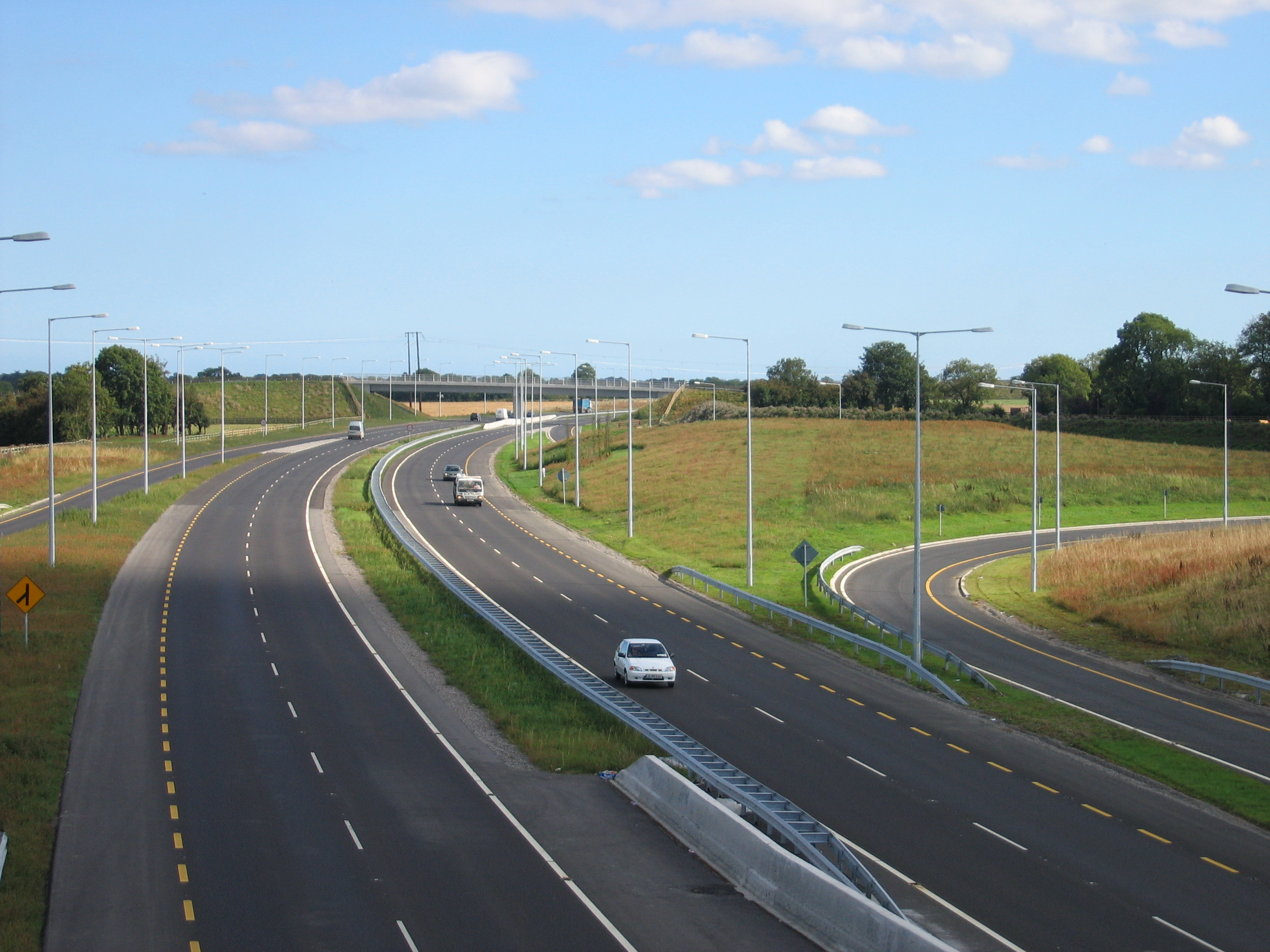
N2 looking south from overbridge at Junction 2.

The route continues through Balrath towards Slane, where a dangerous bridge brings the road through the town by the historic Hill of Slane, now home to the occasional rock festival. The N2 continues through Collon in County Louth. Just after Ardee, the N2 meets the N33, coming from the nearby M1 motorway, which most traffic coming from Dublin uses for N2 destinations north of Ardee. At Ardee, the N2 also meets the N52, a cross-country route from Nenagh, County Tipperary to Dundalk. In County Monaghan, the N2 bypasses Carrickmacross to the east, along a bypass opened on 31 January 2005. This 9 km wide single carriageway has been named The Kavanagh Way, after Monaghan writer and poet Patrick Kavanagh. The route by-passes Castleblayney and Clontibret on the way to Monaghan. North of Monaghan town, the N12 diverges east to the border. The N2 continues north through Emyvale to reach the border at Moy Bridge directly south of Aughnacloy, County Tyrone. From here, the road becomes the A5 road to Omagh, Letterkenny and Derry.

== Upgrades ==
Projects completed on the N2 include a 16 km (10 miles) 2+1 bypass of Castleblayney, which opened on 5 November 2007 . A 3 km (1.9 miles) single carriageway bypass of Monaghan town to the east was opened on 25 September 2006 by Pat Gallagher, Junior Minister For Transport.

Previous planned projects along the N2 included a 4 km (2.5 miles) bypass of Ardee and a 6 km (3.7 miles) bypass of Slane. These projects have now been incorporated into a single project which extends from the end of the Ashbourne Bypass to north of Ardee (N2 Ashbourne to Ardee). The feasibility report for this scheme recommends a dual carriageway cross section. That section of the N2 from the end of the Castleblayney Bypass to the NI Border at Aughnacloy is also being studied (N2 Clontibret to NI Border).

== Discussion ==
Because the N2 contains narrow and steep-gradient sections in the environs of Slane, Collon and south of Ardee, Transport Infrastructure Ireland (TII) recommends that hauliers heading from Dublin to Derry should instead use the M1 motorway from Dublin as far as its junction with the N33 road, then follow N33 to its junction with N2, north of Ardee.

There have been calls (by political parties in both the Republic of Ireland and Northern Ireland) to upgrade the whole Dublin-Derry route to dual carriageway. This would entail upgrading both the N2 and also the A5 in Northern Ireland.

A 2007 Fianna Fáil election policy document on transport included a plan for a dual carriageway from Dublin to Letterkenny and Derry as one of Fianna Fáil's promises if re-elected. Although the N2 was not included in Transport 21, and the Monaghan and Carrickmacross by-passes are single lane national primary roads, a feasibility report completed on the N2 Ashbourne to Ardee section recommended a dual carriageway cross section (including the Slane By-pass). Also, in order to tie in with the A5 Western Transport Corridor north of the border, work on the feasibility study for the N2 Clontibret to NI Border Scheme was commenced. As of 2024, this route has a defined corridor, and is progressing to the design phase. An upgrade of the section from Ardee to Castleblaney to dual carriageway has reached final design, but is suspended due to lack of funding.

In October 2006, the Irish government announced it was funding infrastructure to the value of €1 billion within Northern Ireland where such projects improved connectivity between parts of the Republic. One of the proposed projects to be funded was the upgrading of the A5 Derry–Omagh–Aughnacloy road to dual carriageway for a distance of 88 km (55 mi). The Irish Department of Finance website confirmed on 22 March 2007 that £400 million had been set aside for Northern investment to include a dual carriageway to Derry and Donegal, although the A5 project itself was beset by delays and as of 2024 has still not commenced.

== M2 motorway ==
M2 motorway
- Mótarbhealach M2
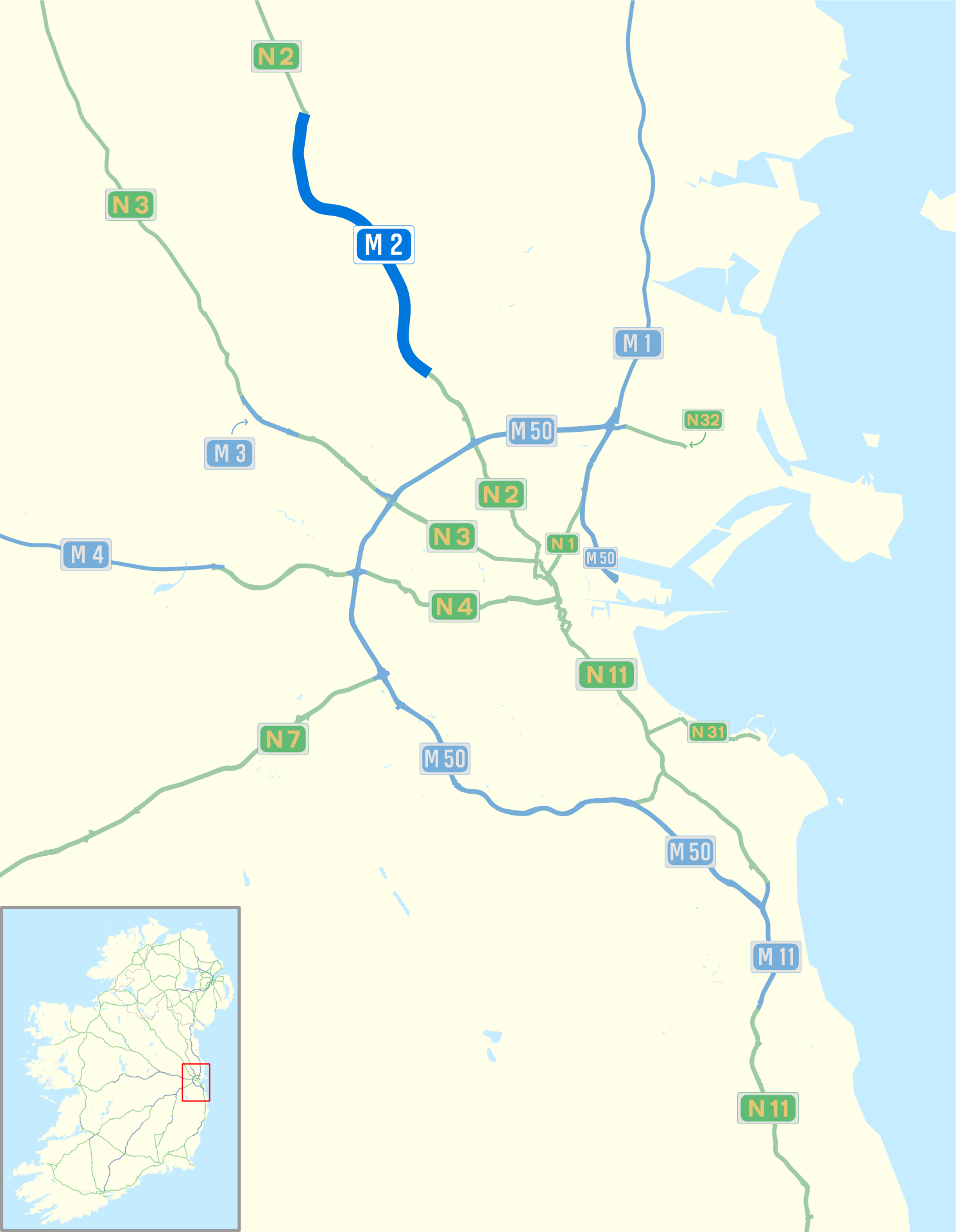
- Clickable image

Route information
- Length: 13 km (8.1 mi)
- Existed: 2004–present
- History: Completed in 2006

Major junctions
- From: M50 Junction 5
- To: Rath (north of Ashbourne)

Location
- Country: Ireland
- Primary destinations: Ashbourne

Highway system
- Roads in Ireland; Motorways; Primary; Secondary; Regional

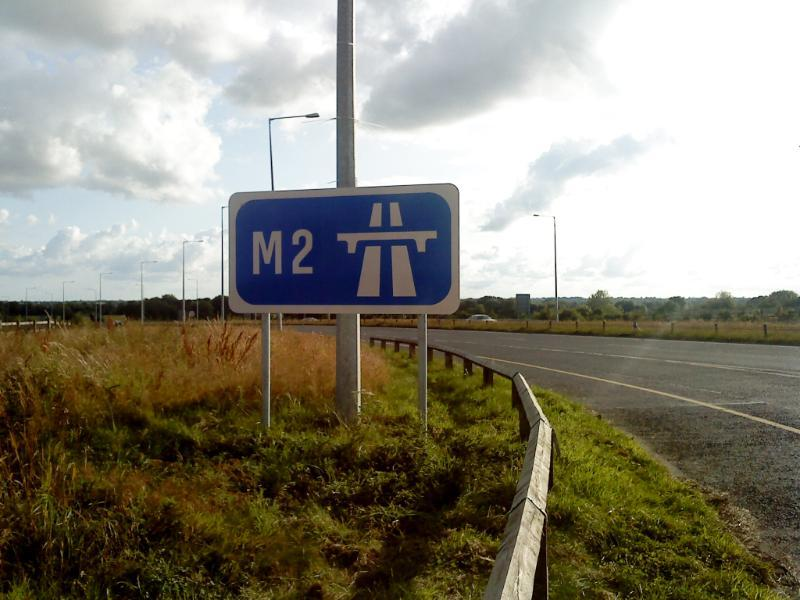
Start of the motorway north of Ashbourne

On 30 September 2008, it was announced that a 13 km (8.1 miles) section of the current N2 from Killshane to Ashbourne was under consideration for re-designation to motorway standard. Public consultation finished in December 2008.

On 14 July 2009, it was announced that the 13 km (8.1 miles) stretch had received ministerial approval to be re-designated. It became a motorway on 28 August 2009.

== Junctions ==
| County | km | mi | Junction | Destinations | Notes |
|---|---|---|---|---|---|
| County Dublin | 0 | 0 | 1 | M50 – Dublin Airport, Dublin Port, Dún Laoghaire | Continues as R135 towards Dublin city centre and Finglas. |
| County Dublin | 1.5 | 0.9 | | Coldwinters | Northbound exit and southbound entrance only. |
| County Dublin | 4.5 | 2.8 | 2 | R135 – St. Margaret's, Blanchardstown | Continues as M2 motorway. |
| County Meath | 11.5 | 7.1 | 3 | R135 – Ashbourne, Ratoath, Swords | Signposted as Ashbourne (South) heading northbound. |
| County Meath | 17 | 10.6 | 4 | R135 – Ashbourne | Motorway terminates at roundabout. Junction number not signposted. Continues as N2 national road. |
1.000 mi = 1.609 km; 1.000 km = 0.621 mi: Incomplete access; Route transition

== See also ==
- Roads in Ireland
- Motorways in Ireland
- National secondary road
- Regional road
