= Ward, Castleknock =

Ward An Barda
- Civil parish
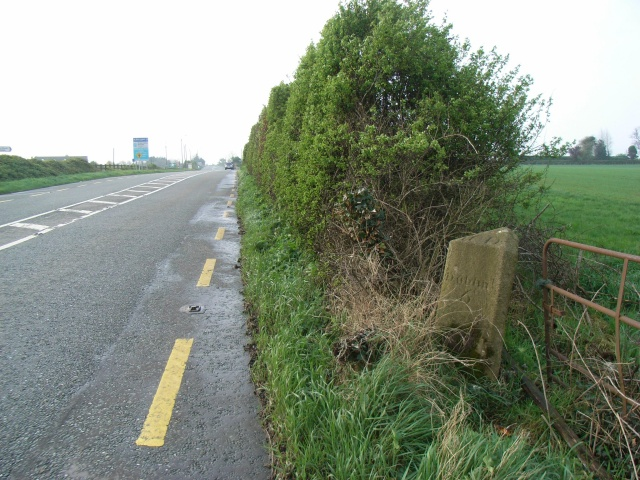
- Milestone on the R135 road (old N2) at Ward

- Location in Ireland
- Coordinates: 53.441568°N 6.349926°W
- Country: Ireland
- County: Fingal
- Barony: Castleknock
- Time zone: UTC+0 (WET)
  - Summer (DST): UTC-1 (IST (WEST))

Ward (Irish: An Bharda) is a civil parish in Fingal, Ireland. It is part of the historical barony of Castleknock. The Ward River, the major tributary of the Broadmeadow River, flows through the area, and probably gave the civil parish its name.

== Location ==
The civil parish lies to the north-east of the civil parish of Mulhuddart, and is bounded to the south-east by the civil parish of Finglas. Its centre of population, which was originally situated on one of the chief roads to the north of Ireland, has now been by-passed by the M2 motorway. The River Ward separates Ward from the barony of Nethercross to the north-east. At the confluence of the Ward and the River Pinkeen to the north-west, the parish borders County Meath. The old N2 national road, now the R135 road, runs through the parish from north to south. Only the townland of Newpark lies to the east of the R135.

Ward is known as the meeting place of the Ward Stag Hunt.

== History ==
After the Norman invasion of Ireland, the lands of la Garde, or the Ward, were possessed by the family of le Bank. Nicholas le Bank was granted extensive property in Ireland by King Henry II of England. In the first half of the thirteenth century a right of turbary in his "tenement near Finglas" was conveyed by Sir Raymond le Bank to the canons of All Saints. During the first half of the sixteenth century the castle, round which the village sprang up, was occupied by Richard Delahide, who was a judge. The castle came into the possession of the barons of Howth.

The Ward was formerly a chapelry of the parish of Finglas, the chapel was dedicated to St. Brigid, and subordinate to St. Canice's Church, Finglas.

=== Townlands ===
The parish contains seven townlands of Cherryhound, Irishtown, Killamonan, Newpark, Spricklestown, Ward Lower and Ward Upper.

== Ecclesiastical parishes ==
The nearest Roman Catholic Church is located at St Margaret's, a Chapel of Ease of the parish of Finglas whose main church is St. Canice's. In the Church of Ireland, the nearest churches are St Canice's, Finglas or in Mulhuddart.
