= R139 road (Ireland) =

Road in Ireland

Coordinates: 53.408190°N 6.206360°W

R139 road
- Bóthar R139

Route information
- Length: 5 km (3.1 mi)

Major junctions
- From: M1/M50 interchange in Clonshaugh
- Northern Cross (with R107)
- To: R106 in Baldoyle

Location
- Country: Ireland

Highway system
- Roads in Ireland; Motorways; Primary; Secondary; Regional

The R139 road is a regional road in Ireland, located in the northeast of Dublin. Until 2012, a portion of the current route was part of the now defunct N32 road.

== Route ==
The official description of the R139 from the Roads Act 1993 (Classification of Regional Roads) Order 2012 reads:

R139: Clonshaugh — Baldoyle, Dublin (Part of old National Route 32)

Between its junction with M50 link road at Clonshaugh Road in the county of Fingal and its junction with R106 at Main Street Baldoyle in the county of Fingal via Belcamp Lane, Clare Hall Avenue and Grange Road in the city of Dublin: Grange Road and Willie Nolan Road in the county of Fingal.
