= R807 road (Ireland) =

Road in Ireland

R807 road
- Bóthar R807
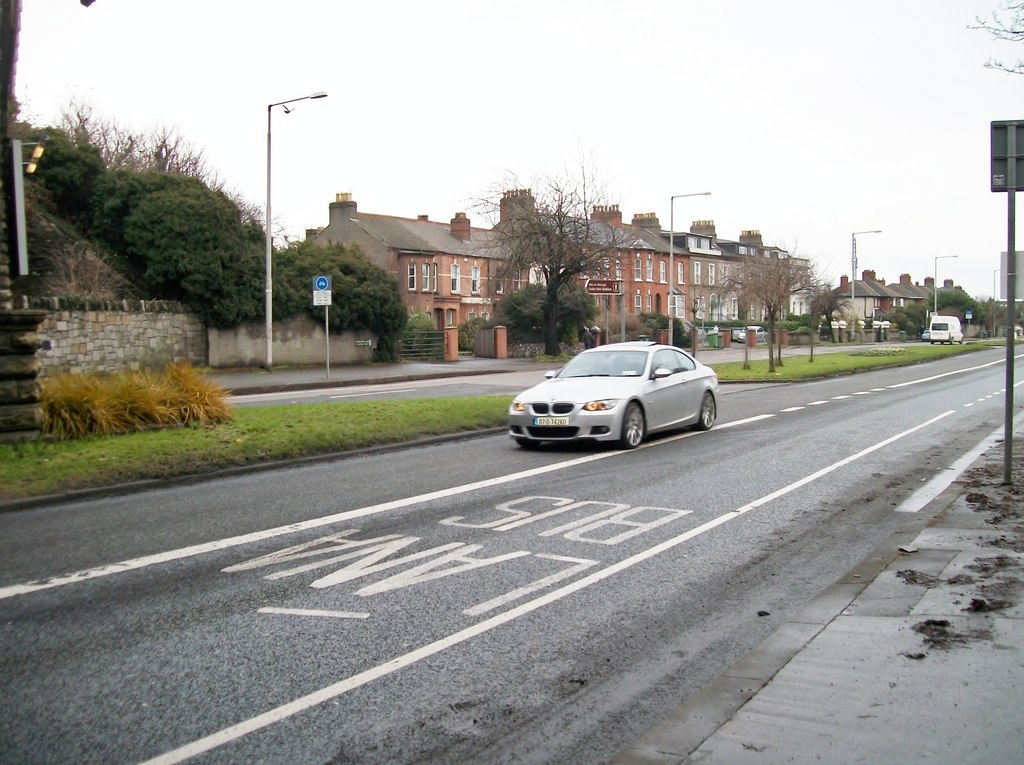
- Clontarf Road, on the R807

Location
- Country: Ireland
- Primary destinations: Dublin

Highway system
- Roads in Ireland; Motorways; Primary; Secondary; Regional

The R807 road is a regional road in Dublin, Ireland.

The official definition of the R807 from the Roads Act 1993 (Classification of Regional Roads) Order 2006 states:

R807: Clontarf Road, Dublin

Between its junction with R105 at Howth Road Fairview and its junction with R105 at Howth Road via Clontarf Road and James Larkin Road all in the city of Dublin.

== See also ==
- Roads in Ireland
- Regional road
