= N33 road (Ireland) =

Road in Ireland

N33 road
- Bóthar N33

Route information
- Length: 7.59 km (4.72 mi)

Location
- Country: Ireland

Highway system
- Roads in Ireland; Motorways; Primary; Secondary; Regional

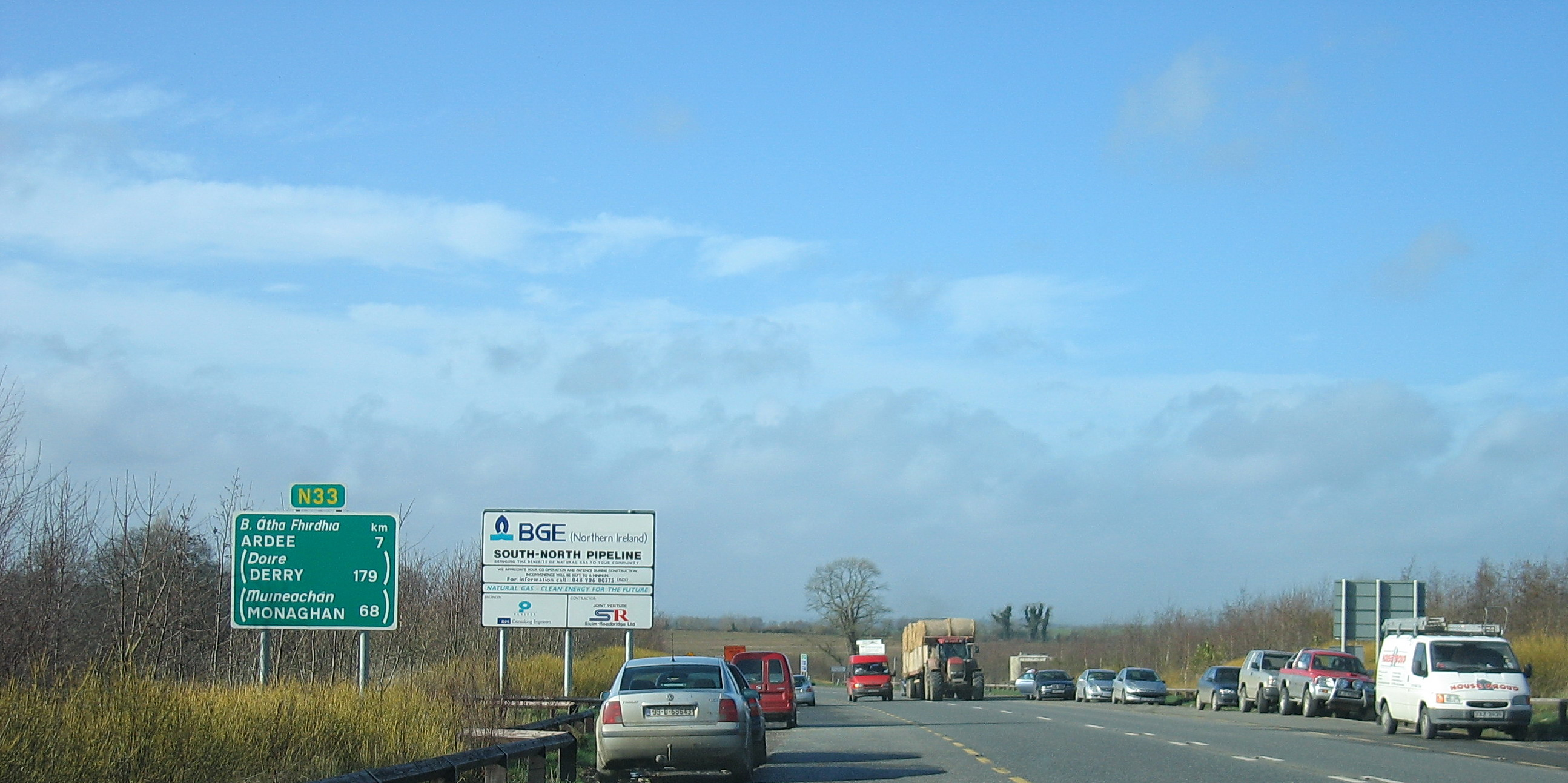
N33 at junction with M1; cars abandoned for unofficial 'park & ride'

The N33 road is a national primary road in Ireland. It provides a link road in County Louth between the N2 Dublin-Derry, M1 Dublin-Belfast, and Ardee-Dunleer routes. The route connects to the N2 and N52 near Ardee, and connects to a junction on the M1 near the Dunleer Bypass almost directly east of the junction on the N2, a distance of 7.59 km. As of 2008 it is the most recently allocated National Primary Route number, and held the record until 2012 when the N40 was created around the south of Cork City.

The route follows the route of the former Ardee railway line for almost its entire length. The road has been heavily used since its opening in 2001. It was recently officially designated as a national primary road. Prior to the 2006 addition to the statutes, while it was signposted as the N33, this numbering had no legal basis (although this was the next available and logical number). In the Roads Act, 1993, (Declaration of National Roads) Order 1994 (S.I. No. 209 of 1994) it is merely listed as "County Louth Dunleer/Ardee new link Between N1 Dunleer By-Pass and N2 north of Ardee".

== See also ==
- Roads in Ireland
- Motorways in Ireland
- National secondary road
- Regional road
