= R129 road (Ireland) =

Road in Ireland

R129 road
- Bóthar R129

Location
- Country: Ireland

Highway system
- Roads in Ireland; Motorways; Primary; Secondary; Regional

The R129 road is a regional road in Fingal, Dublin, Ireland.

The official description of the R129 from the Roads Act 1993 (Classification of Regional Roads) Order 2012 reads:

R129: Coldwinters - Wyanstown, County Dublin

Between its junction with R132 at Coldwinters and its junction with R122 at Wyanstown via Thomondstown, Grange, Ballyboghill, Murragh and Leastown all in the county of Fingal..

== See also ==
- Roads in Ireland
- National primary road
- National secondary road
- Regional road
