= R103 road (Ireland) =

Road in Ireland

R103 road
- Bóthar R103
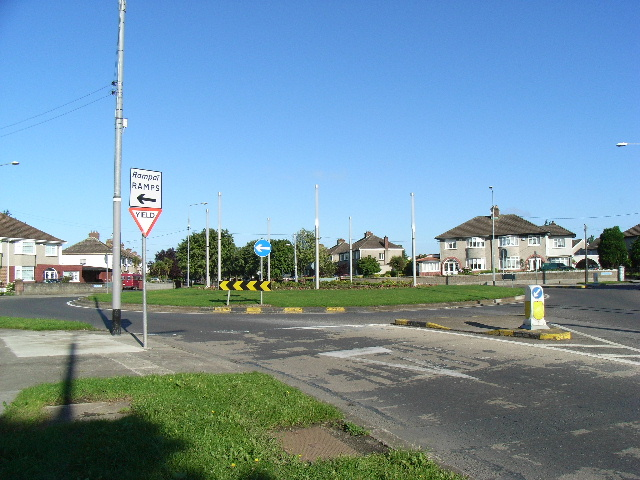
- Glasnevin Avenue roundabout on the R103

Location
- Country: Ireland

Highway system
- Roads in Ireland; Motorways; Primary; Secondary; Regional

The R103 road is a regional road in north Dublin, Ireland, passing through Finglas, between Ballymun and Glasnevin, then passing Donnycarney before reaching Killester at the Howth Road. A major stretch of the road forms Collins Avenue.

The official description of the R103 from the Roads Act 1993 (Classification of Regional Roads) Order 2012 reads:

R103 Finglas - Killester, Dublin

Between its junction with R102 at Tolka Valley Road and its junction with R105 at Howth Road via Cardiffsbridge Road, Mellowes Road, Seamus Ennis Road, Ballygall Road West, Glasnevin Avenue, Collins Avenue Extension, Collins Avenue West, Collins Avenue and Collins Avenue East all in the city of Dublin.

== Collins Avenue ==
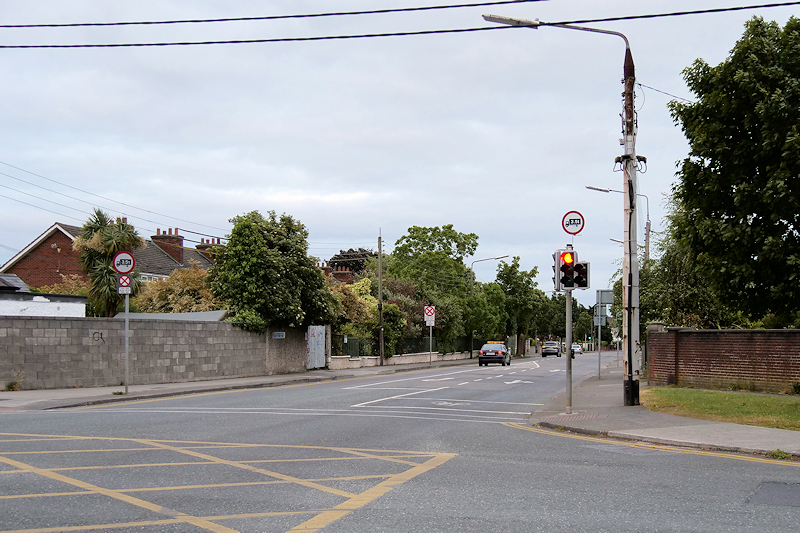
Collins Avenue at Whitehall

Collins Avenue (Irish: Ascaill Uí Choileáin) runs from Glasnevin Avenue at the west to the Howth Road to the east. Collins Avenue was formerly known as Puckstown Lane. It was renamed and redeveloped by Patrick Belton when he began building houses in Drumcondra, Donnycarney, and Santry from the mid-1920s. He also named the earlier Griffith Avenue to the south of Collins Avenue.

Many of the housing schemes along the Avenue, built from the 1930s and 1940s were by the Dublin Corporation primarily through assisted development schemes with builders and developers. Shops and cinema were built on Collins Avenue at Whitehall in 1938. Traffic lights were installed at the junction of Collins Avenue and the Swords Road in 1941, and were switched on on 23 September.

The Dublin City University campus' main entrance is on Collins Avenue.

Collins Avenue formed part of the Dublin Corporation's plan for 3 outer ring roads in Dublin in the 1940s, which never materialised fully. Collins Avenue was planned to form part middle ring road, and was planned to run as far west as Ashtown. The Collins Avenue Extension was constructed from the 1940s.

== See also ==
- Roads in Ireland
- National primary road
- National secondary road
- Regional road
