= R104 road (Ireland) =

Road in Ireland

R104 road
- Bóthar R104
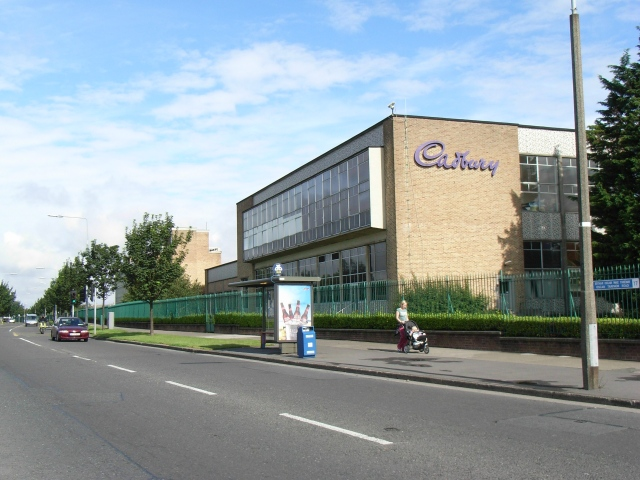
- Cadbury Factory, Coolock, on the R104 (in 2007)

Location
- Country: Ireland

Highway system
- Roads in Ireland; Motorways; Primary; Secondary; Regional

The R104 road is a regional road in north Dublin, Ireland. The road passes through Finglas, Santry, and Coolock, along the northern edge of Raheny and finishes at the coast in Kilbarrack.

The official description of the R104 from the Roads Act 1993 (Classification of Regional Roads) Order 2012 reads:

R104: Finglas - Kilbarrack, Dublin

Between its junction with R135 at North Road Finglas in the city of Dublin and its junction with R132 at Swords Road in the city of Dublin via Saint Margarets Road in the city of Dublin: Saint Margarets Road in the county of Fingal: and Santry Avenue in the city of Dublin

and

between its junction with R132 at Swords Road in the city of Dublin and its junction with R105 at Dublin Road Kilbarrack in the city of Dublin via Coolock Lane, Oscar Traynor Road, Tonlegee Road and Kilbarrack Road in the city of Dublin: and Kilbarrack Road in the county of Fingal.

== See also ==
- Roads in Ireland
- National primary road
- National secondary road
- Regional road
