= R106 road (Ireland) =

Road in Ireland

R106 road
- Bóthar R106
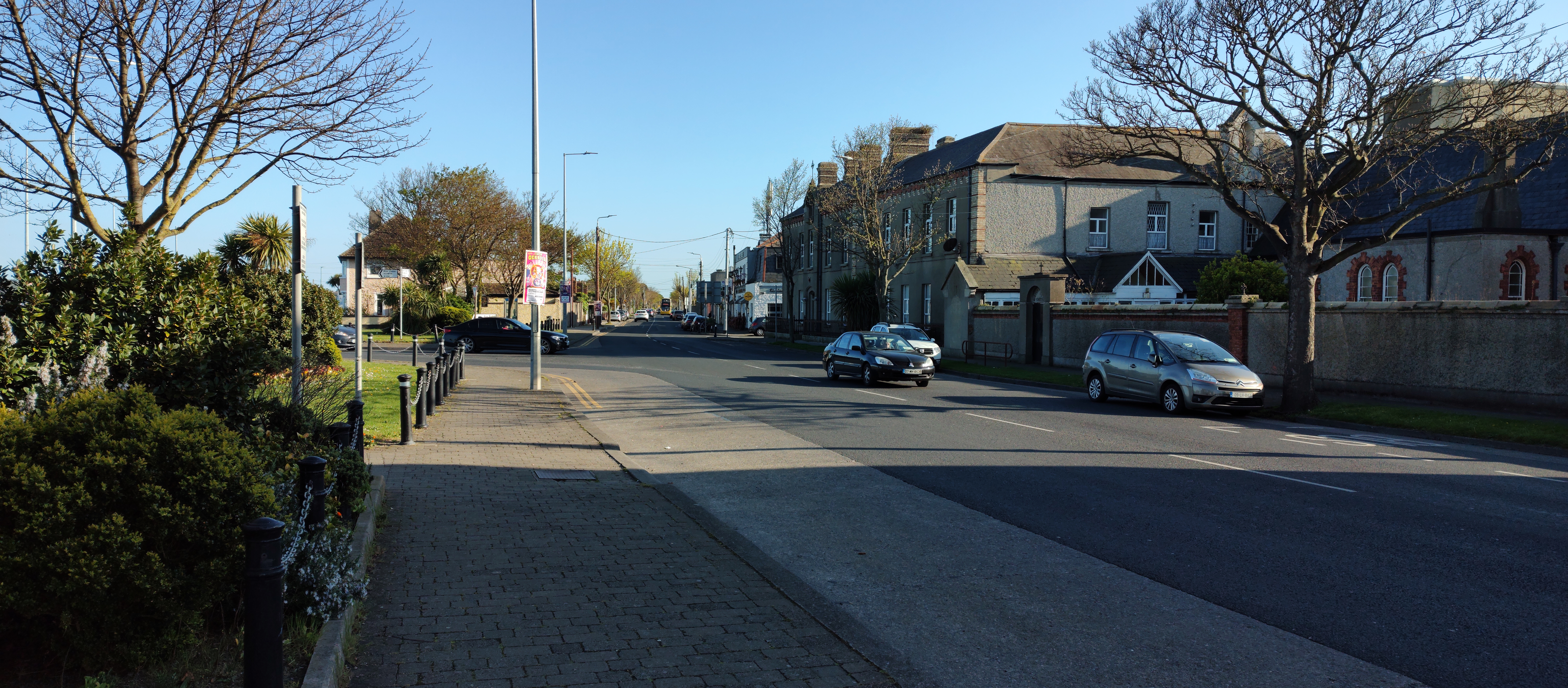
- Main Street, Baldoyle, on the R106

Location
- Country: Ireland

Highway system
- Roads in Ireland; Motorways; Primary; Secondary; Regional

The R106 road is a regional road in north Dublin, Ireland. It runs from Sutton, passing Baldoyle, Portmarnock and Malahide before finishing in Swords.

The official description of the R106 from the Roads Act 1993 (Classification of Regional Roads) Order 2012 reads:

R106: Sutton - Malahide - Swords, County Dublin

Between its junction with R105 at Sutton Cross and its junction with R132 at Swords Demesne via Station Road Sutton; Strand Road, Main Street and Coast Road at Baldoyle; Maynetown, Portmarnock Bridge, The Coast Road, Carrickhill; The Mall, Dublin Road and La Mancha Cross in the town of Malahide; Swords Road and Malahide Road all in the county of Fingal.

== See also ==
- Roads in Ireland
- National primary road
- National secondary road
- Regional road
