= R135 road (Ireland) =

Road in Ireland

R135 road
- Bóthar R135
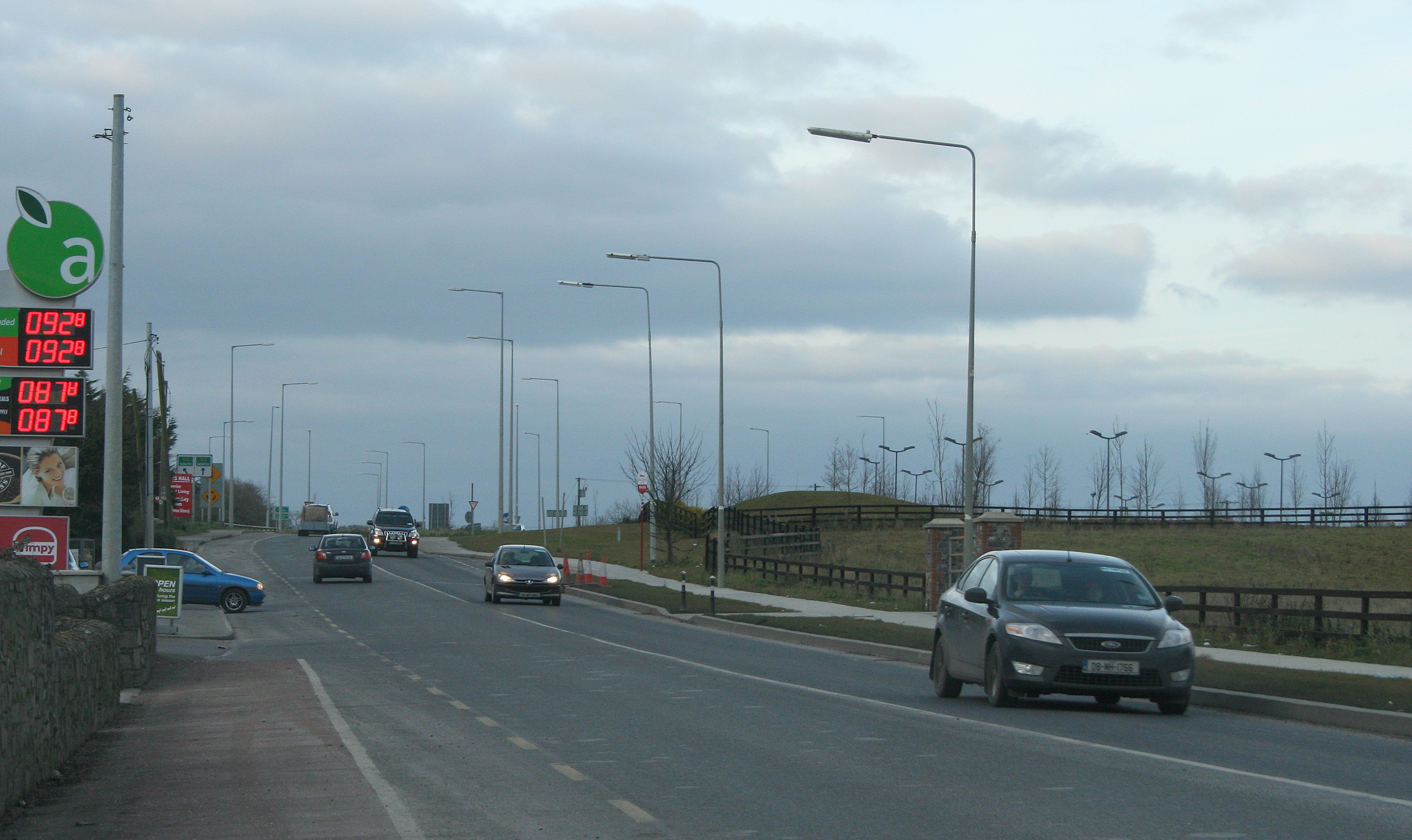
- R135 in Ashbourne approaching the N2

Location
- Country: Ireland

Highway system
- Roads in Ireland; Motorways; Primary; Secondary; Regional

The R135 road is one of Ireland's newest regional roads, being a reclassification of those sections of the former N2 which were bypassed when the N2(M2) Ashbourne By-Pass dual carriageway opened in 2006, and when the Carrickmacross, Castleblayney & Monaghan bypasses were completed.

== Route ==
The official description of the R135 from the Roads Act 1993 (Classification of Regional Roads) Order 2012 reads:

R135: Dublin — Ashbourne, County Meath (Part of Old National Route 2)

Between its junction with R132 at Dorset Street Upper in the city of Dublin and its junction with M50 at Balseskin in the county of Fingal via Saint Marys Place, Western Way, Phibsborough Road (and via North Circular Road, Berkeley Road, Berkeley Street and Blessington Street), Prospect Road, Finglas Road (and via Prospect Way and Botanic Road) and North Road in the city of Dublin: and North Road in the county of Fingal

and

between its junction with N2 at Coldwinters in the county of Fingal and its junction with M2 at Rath in the county of Meath via Killshane Bridge, Broghan, Coolatrath Bridge, Ward Lower and Coolquoy Common in the county of Fingal: Newtown Commons, Baltrasna; Bridge Street and Frederick Street in the town of Ashbourne in the county of Meath.

== See also ==
- Roads in Ireland
- National primary road
- National secondary road
