= Redfern =

Redfern may refer to:

== People and fictional characters ==
- Redfern (surname), a list of people and fictional characters with the surname
- Redfern Froggatt (1924–2003), British footballer

== Places ==
- Redfern, New South Wales, a suburb of Sydney, Australia
  - Redfern railway station
- Electoral district of Redfern, a former electoral district of the Legislative Assembly in New South Wales
- Municipality of Redfern, a former local government area of Sydney
- Redfern, South Dakota, United States, a former mining community

== Businesses ==
- The Redfern Gallery, a London art gallery specialising in contemporary British art
- Redfern (couture), a former London couture house which had branches in Paris and the United States

== Other uses ==
- Redfern All Blacks, an Aboriginal Australian rugby league team established in 1938
- Sceptridium biternatum, a fern that in the fall its leaves and stem turn a reddish-brown / bronze color; known locally as a “red fern”.

== See also ==
- Redfern Oval, Redfern, Australia, a football ground
- Redfern Park, Redfern, Australia, a heritage-listed park
- Redfern Building, Manchester, England, a Grade-II listed building
- Walter Redfern Company, an American aircraft manufacturer
- Redfern v Dunlop Rubber Australia Ltd, a case decided in the High Court of Australia
- Redfearn, a list of people with the surname
