= David Newbigging =

Hong Kong politician and businessman

Sir David Newbigging OBE, DL

Chairman of Jardine, Matheson & Co.
- In office 1975–1983
- Preceded by: Henry Keswick
- Succeeded by: Simon Keswick

Unofficial Member of the Executive Council of Hong Kong
- In office 1980–1984
- Appointed by: Sir Murray MacLehose
- Preceded by: John Henry Bremridge

Unofficial Member of the Legislative Council of Hong Kong
- In office 11 October 1978 – 28 July 1982
- Appointed by: Sir Murray MacLehose
- Preceded by: Sidney Gordon
- Succeeded by: M. G. R. Sandberg

Personal details
- Born: 19 January 1934 (age 92) Tianjin, Republic of China
- Spouse: Carolyn S. Band (m. 1968)
- Children: 3
- Education: Oundle School
- Occupation: Businessman

Sir David Kennedy Newbigging, OBE, DL (Chinese: 紐璧堅; born 19 January 1934) is a British businessman and Hong Kong politician born in China. He was the Tai-pan of Jardine Matheson & Co, the leading British trading firm in East Asia and unofficial member of the Executive Council and the Legislative Council of Hong Kong.

== Family and education ==
Newbigging was born on 19 January 1934 in Tianjin, China to David Locke Newbigging and L. M. Newbigging. David Locke Newbigging was also director of Jardine Matheson & Co and was interned at the Stanley Internment Camp during the Japanese occupation in Hong Kong. For his services for maintaining order during the internment, David Locke was awarded Commander of the Order of the British Empire (CBE) in 1946.

Newbigging was sent aboard and received his education in Canada and was subsequently educated at the Oundle School. After his education, he joined the King's Own Scottish Borderers and was promoted to 2nd lieutenant.

== Jardine career ==
=== Managing positions ===
He joined Jardine Matheson & Co, the leading British trading firm, in 1954 at the age of 20. He became its director in 1967 and worked in various places including from Hong Kong, Taiwan, China, the United Kingdom, Malaysia and Australia throughout the years. In 1970, he was promoted to managing director in 1970 and was chairman and senior managing director of the firm from 1975 until his retirement in 1983. He was also chairman of the other companies under Jardine, including the Hongkong & Kowloon Wharf & Godown Company from 1970 to 1980, Hongkong Land from 1975 to 1983, Hongkong Electric Holdings between 1982 and 1983 (director 1975–83), and Jardine Fleming Holdings from 1975 to 1983.

Newbigging was involved in the struggle against the Keswick family when he and his supporters opposed Henry Keswick to become the next taipan in 1972. The Keswicks prevailed after winning the support of institutional shareholders in London. Henry was named senior managing director, while his uncle John resumed the chairmanship to ensure that the Keswicks did not lose control of the company.

=== Jardine taipan ===
When Newbigging took over from Henry Keswick as the Jardine taipan in 1975, the company was undergoing a rapid decline in power and wealth. Between 1975 and 1979, Jardine Matheson's profits grew at an annual rate of only 10 percent (a poor record for Hong Kong). Newbigging responded by disposing of underperforming Jardine subsidiaries outside Hong Kong. He redoubled efforts to increase trade with China (which had only invited the company back into China in 1979) and resumed investments in Hong Kong-based enterprises. However, due to the lack of expertise, these enterprises lost money in almost every venture.

During the 1970s, British companies in Hong Kong such as Jardine Matheson, Swire Group, Hutchison Whampoa, and Wheelock & Co, were consistently outperformed by rising local, ethnically Chinese hongs. In 1980, Jardine was outbid by shipping magnate Sir Yue-Kong Pao for the Hongkong & Kowloon Wharf & Godown Company in which the two groups had previously shared control when the latter decided to diversify from ships into property. Hongkong Land, a development company established in 1889 by William Keswick's brother James Johnstone Keswick, faced consistent threats from Li Ka-shing's Cheung Kong Holdings and nearly went bust in the early 1980s. When he discovered a secret buyer had begun acquiring shares of Jardine Matheson stock in late 1980, many observers suspected that either Li or Pao (or worse, both) were attempting to purchase a large enough share in Jardine Matheson to win control over Hongkong Land. Newbigging announced in early November that Jardine Matheson and Hongkong Land had agreed to increase their interests in each other, so as to make it impossible for any party to gain control of either company. The cross-ownership scheme, however, placed both companies deeply into debt. The defensive actions required during 1980 forced Jardine Matheson to sell its interest in Reunion Properties to raise cash. Newbigging was criticised for being too conservative and placing too much emphasis on local and regional operations. The Keswick family also saw it as a chance to remove Newbigging from office. Newbigging finally stepped down as senior managing director in June 1983, but retained the titular position of chairman. He was replaced as taipan by 40-year-old Simon Keswick, brother of Henry Keswick.

During his Jardine chairmanship, Newbigging was also director of the Hongkong & Shanghai Banking Corporation and the Hongkong Telephone Co Ltd from 1975 to 1983, Wah Kwong Shipping Holdings Ltd (Hong Kong) and Wah Kwong Maritime Transport Holdings Ltd (Hong Kong).

=== Public offices ===
Besides his company positions, he was also appointed to various public positions by the colonial government. He had been chairman of the Hong Kong Tourist Association from 1977 to 82, and the Hong Kong General Chamber of Commerce in 1980 to 1982. From 1978 to 1982, he was the chamber representative in the Legislative Council of Hong Kong. In 1980, he was appointed by Governor Sir Murray MacLehose to the Executive Council of Hong Kong until his retirement in 1984.

== UK career ==
Newbigging returned to England after his retirement from Jardine and was chairman of various companies including Rentokil Group plc, Redfearn plc, NM UK Limited, Ivory and Sime plc, Maritime Transport Services Ltd, Faupel plc, Equitas Holdings Limited, Equitas Management Services Limited, Equitas Reinsurance Limited, Equitas Limited, Friends Provident (formerly Friends Provident Life Office), Thistle Hotels, Talbot Holdings Ltd, Synesis Life Ltd and Academic Partnerships Int Ltd. He had been deputy chairman of the Provincial Group plc and the Benchmark Group. He was the director of Rennies Consolidated Holdings Ltd, Sun Life & Provincial Holdings, Provincial Life Assurance Co Ltd, British Coal (formerly the National Coal Bd), CIN Management Ltd, United Meridian Corporation (USA), Market Board Corporation of Lloyd's, Merrill Lynch, Ocean Energy, Paccar, Academic Partnerships LLP Dallas USA. He also held the membership of the International Council of the Morgan Guaranty Trust Company of New York.

He was chairman of the Cancer Research UK from 2004 to 2010 and was its deputy chairman of the Council of Trustees from 2002 to 2004. He is a trustee of the UK Trust for Nature Conservation in Nepal (formerly King Mahendra UK Trust for Nature Conservation) since 1988. He was chairman of the Wiltshire Community Foundation from 1991 to 1997, the Council of the Mission to Seafarers from 1993 to 2006, and the Academic Partnerships Int Ltd from 2012 to 2015. He was High Sheriff of Wiltshire in 2003 and Liveryman of the Worshipful Company of Grocers.

For his voluntary service to cancer research, he was knighted in 2011.

== Personal life ==
Newbigging married Carolyn S. Band in Hong Kong in 1968 and has one son and two daughters. His hobbies include Chinese art and most outdoor sports.

== See also ==
- History of Jardine, Matheson & Co.

Business positions
| Preceded by Henry Keswick | Chairman of the Jardine, Matheson & Co. 1975–1983 | Succeeded by Simon Keswick |
| Preceded by Nigel A. Rigg | Chairman of the Hong Kong General Chamber of Commerce; 1980–1981 | Succeeded by John L. Marden |
| Preceded by Kenneth Fung | Chairman of the Ocean Park Hong Kong | Succeeded by Sir Gordon Macwhinnie |
Political offices
| Preceded by J. H. Bremridge | Chairman of the Hong Kong Tourist Association; 1977–1982 | Succeeded by Duncan Bluck |
Legislative Council of Hong Kong
| Preceded by Sidney Gordon | Unofficial Member; Representative for Hong Kong General Chamber of Commerce; 1978–1982 | Succeeded by M. G. R. Sandberg |
