= 2016–17 Arsenal F.C. season =

English football club season

Arsenal
2016–17 season
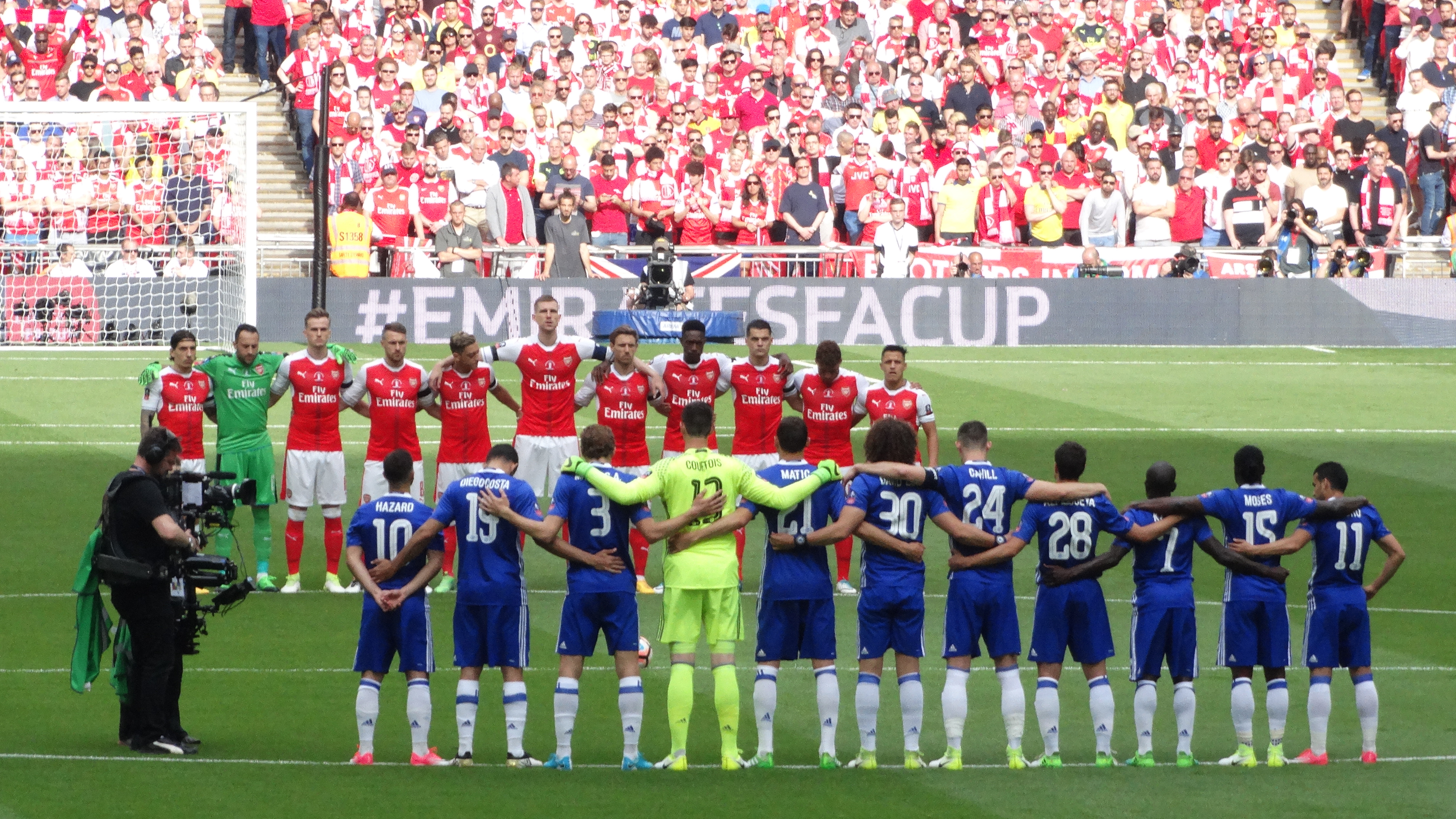
- Arsenal and Chelsea line-up before the 2017 FA Cup Final at Wembley Stadium, May 2017
- Chairman: Sir Chips Keswick
- Manager: Arsène Wenger
- Stadium: Emirates Stadium
- Premier League: 5th
- FA Cup: Winners
- EFL Cup: Fifth round
- UEFA Champions League: Round of 16
- Top goalscorer: League: Alexis Sánchez (24); All: Alexis Sánchez (30)
Home colours	Away colours	Third colours

The 2016–17 season was Arsenal's 25th in the Premier League, their 91st consecutive season in the top flight of English football and their 100th season in the top flight overall. The club participated in the Premier League, FA Cup, EFL Cup and the UEFA Champions League.

In the league, despite being in the title race in the first half of the season, their form collapsed in the second half of the season, with Arsenal finishing outside the top four of the Premier League for the first time since the 1995–96 season. In Europe, despite topping their group, Bayern Munich inflicted Arsenal's heaviest defeat in a two-legged European tie with a 10–2 aggregate defeat, with increasing criticism towards manager Arsène Wenger, as well as calls for change within the Arsenal hierarchy. Despite the loss of form and heavy fan disapproval towards the end of the season, Arsenal won the FA Cup for a record 13th time, beating Chelsea 2–1 in the final. The victory saw manager Arsène Wenger become the most successful manager in FA Cup history with seven wins.

The season covers the period from 1 July 2016 to 30 June 2017.

== Review ==
=== Pre-season ===
Arsenal made its first summer signing prior to start of the current season on 25 May, with the acquisition of Swiss midfielder Granit Xhaka for a reported £30 million fee. Xhaka's involvement in UEFA Euro 2016 and his subsequent desire to secure his club future beforehand enabled Arsenal to uncharacteristically complete a signing before the formal opening of the transfer window. In the following weeks, the Gunners activated the release clause of Leicester City forward Jamie Vardy. However, they failed in their attempts to bring Vardy from the Premier League champions, with the England forward instead opting to sign a contract extension with the East Midlands club. Manager Arsène Wenger came under fire for failing to secure the transfer, and fans were outraged further when Arsenal signed young forward Takuma Asano from Sanfrecce Hiroshima, due to the relative unproven nature of the forward's capabilities. Arsenal made its third summer signing on 22 July, signing Bolton Wanderers' Player of the Year Rob Holding. He joined for a reported £2 million fee from the League One side. Arsenal played Lens later that day in their first pre-season game, with a late chipped goal from Alex Oxlade-Chamberlain earning Arsenal a hard-fought 1–1 draw. Arsenal then flew out to California for two more pre-season fixtures, against the MLS All-Stars and Chivas Guadalajara. Wenger would state that Per Mertesacker would not be on the tour, after picking up an injury against Lens. He would later confirm that Mertesacker had surgery in his native Germany, and would be out for "months". Arsenal beat the All Stars 2–1 on 28 July (July 29 BST), with a Joel Campbell penalty and a Chuba Akpom close-range finish coming either side of a goal from Didier Drogba. Arsenal concluded their tour on 31 July (1 August BST) with a 3–1 win over Chivas. Oxlade-Chamberlain and Akpom scored their second pre-season goals each, with the opener scored by Holding. Wenger confirmed that the injury to Mertesacker meant he'd need to sign a replacement ideally before the season's opener against Liverpool on 14 August, as talks of incoming transfers intensified.

=== August ===
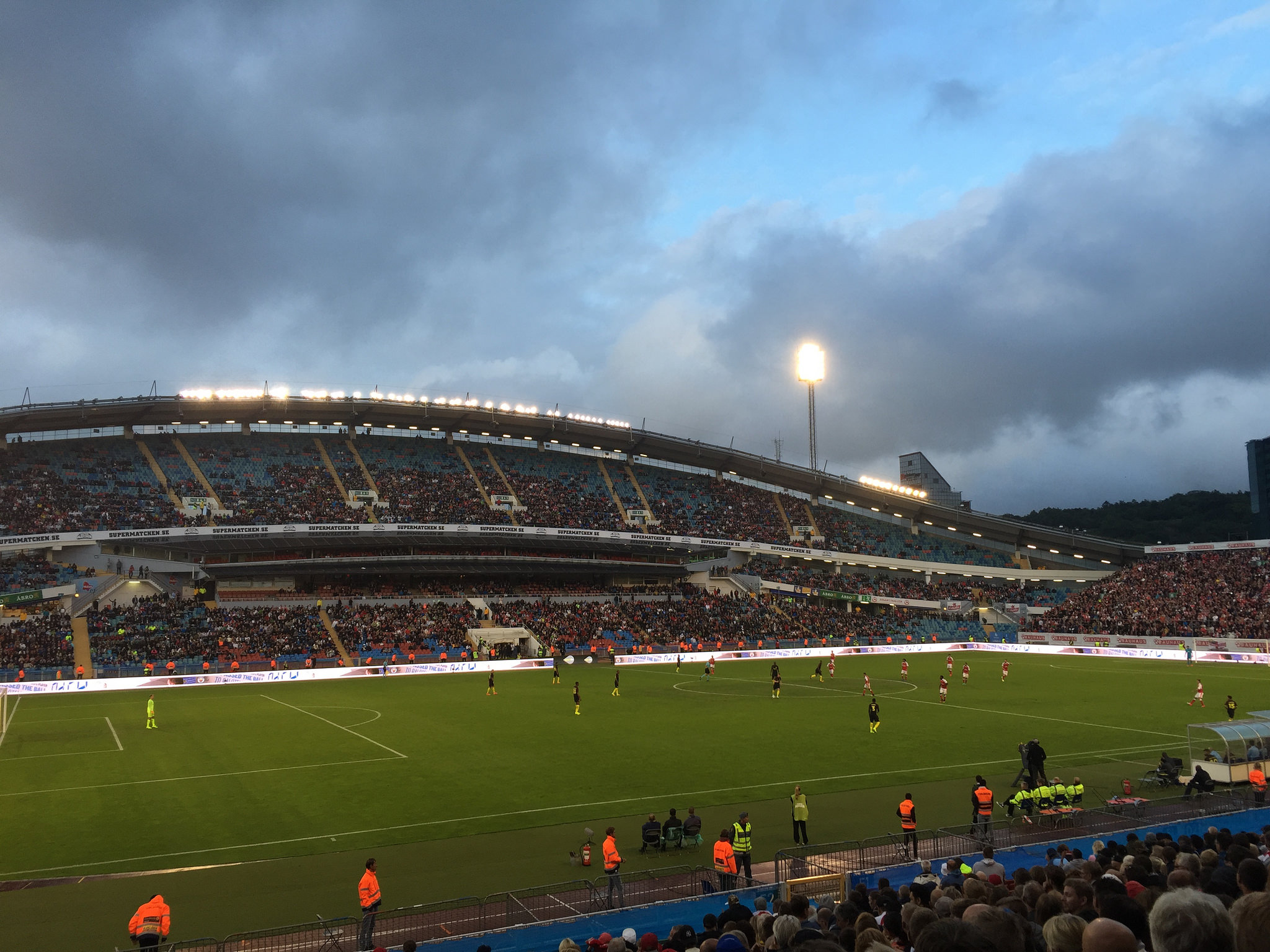
The 2016 Super Match versus Manchester City at Ullevi Stadium in Gothenburg, Sweden was Arsenal's last pre-season fixture.

Despite the absence of key players, Wenger gave positive news ahead of a trip to Scandinavia; Alexis Sánchez and Aaron Ramsey would join the team for the tour and would likely be fit for the season's opener against Liverpool. Gabriel also returned after missing the US tour with tonsillitis. Arsenal's pre-season continued in Norway, against Viking FK. The Gunners were 8–0 winners; Joel Campbell continued his pre-season form with a double, while Chuba Akpom added his third goal in as many pre-season games. Alex Iwobi also scored a late double, with the remaining goals coming from Theo Walcott, Santi Cazorla (although the Spaniard missed a third-minute penalty), and an own goal from defender Michael Haukås. In a post match interview, Wenger confirmed that Mesut Özil, Laurent Koscielny and Olivier Giroud would not be fit for the game against Liverpool in nine days, with the trio returning to training on 8 August due to their extended exploits at Euro 2016. He stated that Jack Wilshere would be in training after a knee injury, but he could also miss the opening game, and that Mertesacker would not be available for four months. Arsenal concluded their pre-season with a 3–2 win over Manchester City. Akpom scored for the fourth game running, while Walcott and Iwobi scored for the second successive game. Sergio Agüero and Kelechi Iheanacho scored either side of the Arsenal goals. The game ended on a sour note, however, with Gabriel sustaining a serious injury. The Brazilian was stretchered off, meaning Arsenal was left with Koscielny acting as the club's only available senior centre-back. Wenger's pre-match press conference ahead of the opening day clash with Liverpool was that Gabriel would be back by October, and that Carl Jenkinson (returning from a loan at West Ham United) would be fit in November after a knee injury suffered on loan in January.

Similar to last season, Arsenal could not carry on its pre-season form when the league season started. Despite goals from Walcott, Oxlade-Chamberlain and Calum Chambers, Arsenal lost 4–3 at home to Liverpool. The club's opening day defeat was the second in succession, and the third in four years (after defeats to Aston Villa and West Ham in 2013–14 and 2015–16, respectively). Walcott gave Arsenal the lead after missing a penalty, but a Philippe Coutinho free-kick drew the sides level before half-time. An Adam Lallana finish, a second for Coutinho, and a goal for debutant Sadio Mané saw Arsenal go behind 4–1 after 63 minutes. Alex Oxlade-Chamberlain pulled one back with a solo finish, and Calum Chambers headed in a Cazorla free kick. However, the Gunners failed to force a fourth in the final 15 minutes. Arsenal also had Ramsey limp off, making him Arsenal's fifth injured player in the senior team, alongside Jenkinson, Gabriel, Mertesacker and Danny Welbeck. Xhaka and Holding were given their debuts; Xhaka came off the bench in the second half, while the latter started alongside Chambers in defence.

Arsenal went to the King Power Stadium on the second matchday, facing champions Leicester City. Both teams were aiming to bounce back from opening-weekend losses, and while both squads had opportunities of their own, Arsenal enjoyed the better of the first half, with Oxlade-Chamberlain shooting narrowly wide. Despite various attacking exploits from either side in both halves, neither could not find a breakthrough in a fiercely-contested game, as it concluded 0–0. The result left the Gunners 12th, with one point from their first two games. Arsenal would then travel away to Watford, with both sides aiming to achieve their first wins of the campaign, after sustaining a defeat and a draw from the opening two league matches. Arsenal would gain the lead after Cazorla converted a penalty following a challenge from Nordin Amrabat on Sánchez, who would later score from a Walcott cross. Özil clinched Arsenal's third on the stroke of half-time, heading in from Sánchez's crisp pass into the box. Roberto Pereyra would also score for the Hornets on his debut midway through the second half, as Arsenal won 3–1. Arsenal would then announce the signings of Lucas Pérez on 28 August, with the forward joining from Deportivo de La Coruña after the Gunners activated the Spaniard's reported £17.1 million release clause. The deal proceeded Arsenal confirming the signing of German defender Shkodran Mustafi from Valencia on 30 August. Mustafi joined the Gunners for £35 million, making him the club's joint second most expensive player, with him commanding the same fee as Sánchez three seasons prior.

=== September ===
Following the international break, Arsenal resumed their Premier League campaign with a hard-fought 2–1 home victory over Southampton. Despite an unfortunate own goal by Petr Čech, the Gunners responded with two unanswered goals to ensure the win. In the first half, Laurent Koscielny equalised through a bicycle kick whilst Santi Cazorla struck a penalty in the dying minutes of the match to lead Arsenal to victory. Furthermore, the match saw the debuts of Shkodran Mustafi and Lucas Pérez, with the former making the most clearances and interceptions in the match. Arsenal would begin its 19th consecutive season in the UEFA Champions League three days later with a 1–1 away draw against Paris Saint-Germain. Despite going behind after 42 seconds following an Edinson Cavani header, Arsenal bounced back in the latter stages of the game, with Alexis Sánchez rifling in Arsenal's first shot on target. Olivier Giroud, who was brought on as a substitute, picked up two yellow cards in his 27 minutes, thus causing him to miss the home match against Basel on 28 September. Arsenal would then travel to newly promoted Hull City on 17 September. The Gunners took the lead through Sánchez, who deflected in Alex Iwobi's shot. Sánchez had a penalty saved before half time after a handball by Jake Livermore, who received a red card as a result. In the second half, Arsenal went 2–0 up through a Theo Walcott chip before Hull got a goal back, with Robert Snodgrass converting his penalty when Čech took down Dieumerci Mbokani. Sánchez got his second goal of the game with four minutes later, to restore the two-goal lead. Substitute Granit Xhaka scored his first goal in the last minute of stoppage time, with his 25-yard drive wrapping up a 4–1 win.

The club's next match saw Arsenal kick off their EFL Cup campaign away to Nottingham Forest. Xhaka opened the scoring with his second long range goal in the space of a week, and new signing Pérez scored a double before Oxlade-Chamberlain scored in stoppage time as Arsenal won 4–0, with Nicklas Bendtner making his first competitive appearance against his former side (having played an Emirates Cup friendly a year prior with VfL Wolfsburg). Arsenal were then drawn at home to Reading in the fourth round of the competition. Arsenal's next game saw them host Chelsea, a team the club had not beaten in the League since 2011. Arsenal ran riot in the first half, with Sánchez, Walcott and Mesut Özil all finding the back of the net. The half time score of 3–0 remained unchanged at the final whistle. Arsenal's final game of September saw them host Basel in the Champions League, which was the first ever meeting between the clubs in European competition. Xhaka started against the team he began his career with, and also faced his brother Taulant for the first time in club football while Mohamed Elneny was also brought on as a substitute against his former side. Walcott scored a first half double, with a brace in assists from Sánchez, securing a 2–0 win.

=== October ===
Arsenal resumed Premier League action on 2 October, facing Burnley at Turf Moor. Burnley often chose to sit back during the game, allowing Arsenal to apply attacking pressure, although, both had chances to win the match. Arsenal's pressure finally got to a resistant Burnley side, with Laurent Koscielny scoring at a last minute corner. The controversial goal had claims off both handball and offside, after the defender knocked the ball in with his elbow on the goal-line. Burnley manager Sean Dyche questioned referee Craig Pawson following the game, as the referee had a clear sight of the incident. Retired referee Dermot Gallagher, however, stood by the ruling, claiming it was not an intentional handball. Arsenal hosted Swansea City after the international break, looking for its first home win against the Swans since September 2011. Theo Walcott scored his fourth and fifth league goals early on, giving Arsenal a two-goal lead before Gylfi Sigurðsson pulled one back before the break. Mesut Özil added a third on his 28th birthday, before Borja reduced the deficit once more. A controversial red card for a cynical Granit Xhaka challenge on Modou Barrow set up a dramatic finale, but Arsenal prevailed, winning 3–2. This allowed the Gunners to move joint top with league leaders Manchester City. Arsenal would resume its Champions League campaign on 19 October, with a home game against Bulgarian champions, Ludogorets Razgrad. Goals from Sánchez, Walcott, Oxlade-Chamberlain and a career first hat-trick for Özil saw Arsenal to a resounding 6–0 win over the Bulgarians. The victory took the Gunners to seven wins in a row in all competitions.

Arsenal's next game would be at home to Middlesbrough in the Premier League. In an end to end clash, Arsenal were denied a late goal from Özil due to an offside, and the match finished 0–0. It was Arsenal's first draw at home since April, and their second of the season. It also ended a run of six consecutive league wins. Arsenal's next match was a home tie in the EFL Cup against Reading. The sides met nearly four years after a famous 7–5 Arsenal win at the same stage of the competition. Oxlade-Chamberlain continued his fine form with a double to give Arsenal a 2–0 win, and set up a quarter final clash with Southampton on 30 November. Oxlade-Chamberlain's form saw him awarded with a Premier League start against basement side Sunderland. The winger provided an assist as doubles from Olivier Giroud, his first goals of the season, and from Sánchez saw Arsenal convincingly win 4–1. A Jermain Defoe penalty helped the Black Cats get onto the scoresheet. Arsenal's next game would be away at Ludogorets in the Champions League on 1 November.

=== November ===
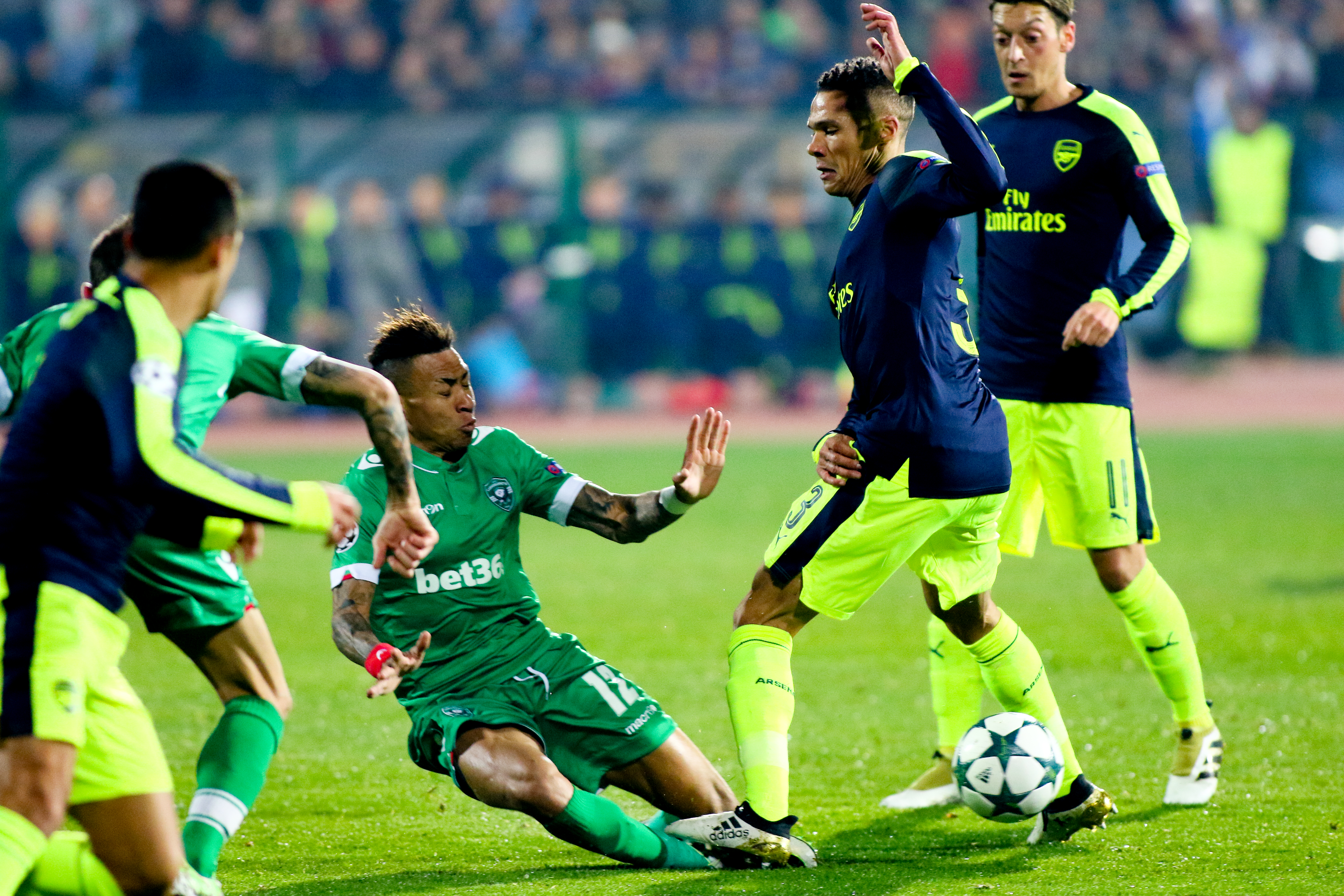
Kieran Gibbs attempts evasion of a challenge at Ludogorets Razgrad in the UEFA Champions League.

Arsenal started November with a Champions League game away to Ludogorets Razgrad. Despite the Bulgarian side going into a shock 2–0 lead early on, Arsenal eventually came back with goals through Granit Xhaka, Olivier Giroud and a late Mesut Özil goal to win 3–2 and qualify for the knockout stages. This took Arsenal's unbeaten run to 15 games in all competitions. Arsenal then participated in the North London derby, hosting Tottenham Hotspur in Premier League action on 6 November. Arsenal gained the lead just prior to the half-time break, with Kevin Wimmer glancing Özil's free-kick past Hugo Lloris, before Spurs responded with a Harry Kane spot-kick following a tangle between Laurent Koscielny and Mousa Dembélé. Despite presses from either side late on, the game ended 1–1, and left Arsenal fourth in the Premier League going into the international break. Arsenal returned to Premier League action against Manchester United at Old Trafford on 19 November. During the match, Arsenal had not had an effort on goal and often conceded to allow United to control the game for long periods, and their advances toward goal were rewarded through a Juan Mata left-foot finish after 68 minutes. During the dying moments of the game, however, a substitute Giroud rose at the far post to head home an Alex Oxlade-Chamberlain cross.

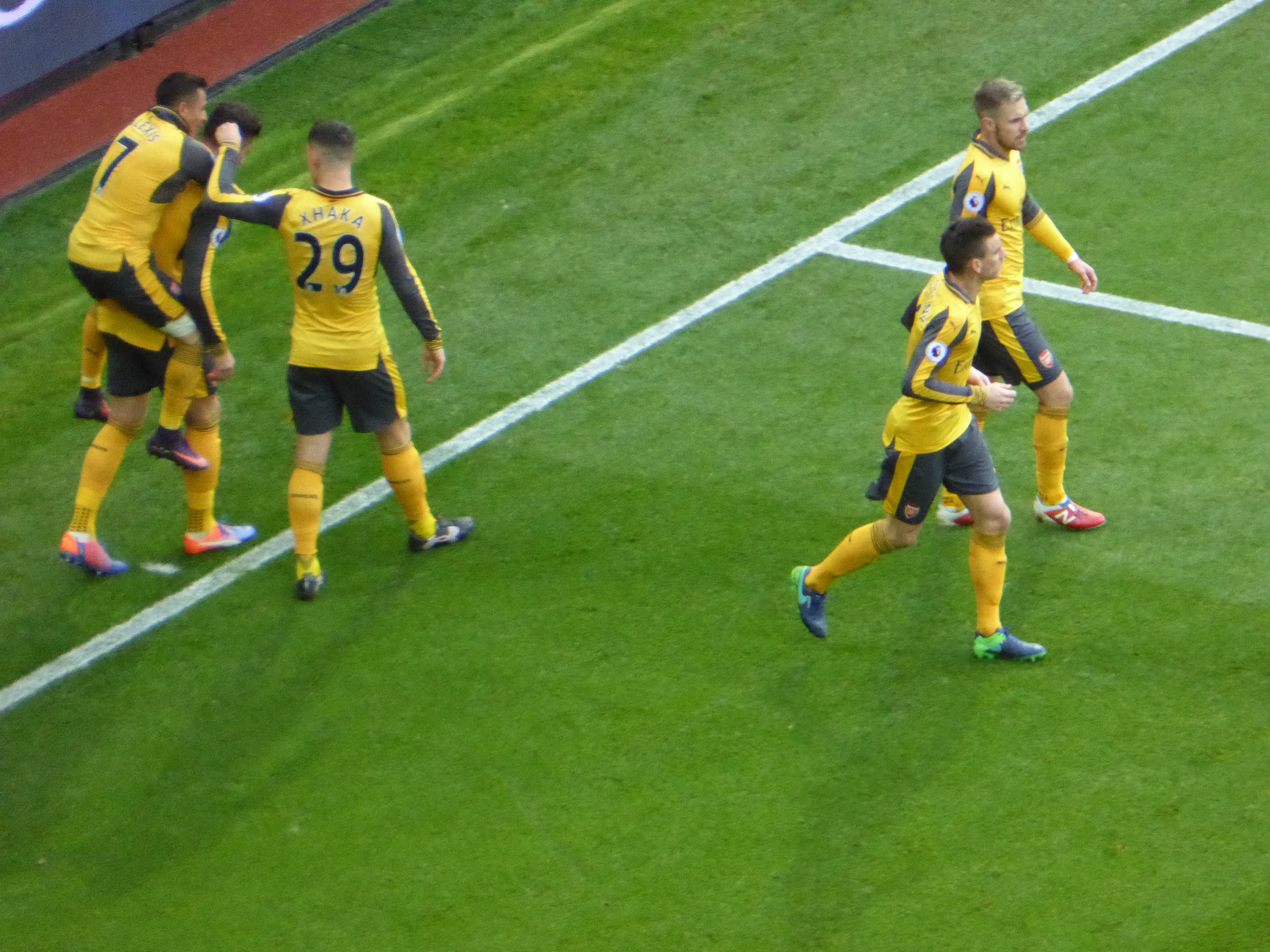
The rivals share the points as the Gunners celebrate Olivier Giroud's late leveller against Manchester United at Old Trafford.

Arsenal then continued in their Champions League campaign with a home game to Paris-Saint Germain, with Arsenal requiring a win to secure top spot in their group as the first round concludes, finishing second in six consecutive seasons. Early on, Edinson Cavani slide home from a Blaise Matuidi cross, before Arsenal gained one back through a penalty from Giroud after a Grzegorz Krychowiak tackle on Alexis Sánchez. Midway through the second half, Arsenal obtained the lead when a penalty-box rebound struck Marco Verratti, before PSG responded through a ricocheted Lucas header off Alex Iwobi 13 minutes from time as the game ended 2–2. The French champions now have an advantage on head-to-head away goals with one round of games left after a 1–1 draw earlier in the competition. The Gunners then hosted AFC Bournemouth on 27 November, and were gifted the lead when Steve Cook's poor backpass allowed Sánchez to calmly side-foot past Adam Federici. Despite Callum Wilson's penalty equaliser, Walcott managed to score after a Nacho Monreal cross in the 53rd minute, before Sánchez secured the victory after slotting in Giroud's cross, moving the Gunners to fourth, three points behind leaders Chelsea. To conclude November, Arsenal welcomed Southampton to play in the quarter-finals of EFL Cup, hoping to win the competition for the first time in Wenger's tenure at the club. The Gunners fielded a side with 10 changes to the previous game, and saw Jordy Clasie and Ryan Bertrand secure victory and inflict the first defeat on Arsenal since the opening day of the season, as Arsenal bowed out of the competition.

=== December ===
Arsenal responded to the midweek League Cup defeat with a dominant 5–1 win at West Ham United. Mesut Özil opened the scoring before Alexis Sánchez scored two goals in eight minutes. Substitute Andy Carroll headed home to give the hosts hope but it was determined for three points to go Arsenal's favour as Alex Oxlade-Chamberlain struck a 25-yard strike before Sánchez completed his hat trick, sprinting through the West Ham defence and chipping in. Three days later was the Gunners' final Champions League group match against Basel in Switzerland. Arsenal, who started a few of the fringe players for this match, prevailed 4–1 with Lucas Pérez scoring a hat-trick as well as Alex Iwobi tapping in his first goal of the season. On 10 December Arsenal continued the Premier League campaign as they faced Stoke City at the Emirates. Charlie Adam's penalty gave the visitors a shock lead but Arsenal replied with Theo Walcott equalising before second half goals by Özil and Iwobi as the Gunners ultimately won 3–1.

A run of 14 league matches unbeaten were responded bitterly by back-to-back away defeats just before Christmas. First Arsenal took on Everton at Goodison Park but lost 2–1. Despite the Gunners taking the lead through Alexis Sánchez's deflected free kick the hosts equalised before half-time through Séamus Coleman before Ashley Williams headed home a late winner. Phil Jagielka was then sent off as Arsenal pressed on to find an equaliser and had two shots cleared off the line. Everton held on to win and end Arsenal's unbeaten run in the Premier League. It got worse for them five days later as they lost against Manchester City at the City of Manchester Stadium. Theo Walcott scored early in the first half but City responded during the second. Leroy Sané netted the equaliser on 47 minutes before Raheem Sterling scored the winner from a tight angle. The match ended 2–1 to Manchester City inflicting a second consecutive league defeat on Arsenal. However Arsenal went on to win the next Premier League match against West Bromwich Albion at the Emirates. Olivier Giroud, who made his first league start of the season, scored the winner to revive Arsenal's title hopes. The Gunners' final match of the year ended in relieving victory.

=== January ===
On New Year's Day, Arsenal continued the league campaign and played against Premier League strugglers Crystal Palace. Arsenal won the match 2-0. On 17 minutes, Olivier Giroud established the lead in tremendous fashion, meeting Alexis Sánchez's cross and reaching the ball with his left foot from behind his head, ergo a scorpion kick which brought the ball off the underside of the bar and into the net – a response originally to Henrikh Mkhitaryan's scorpion goal for Manchester United against Sunderland on Boxing Day. Alex Iwobi scored the second goal, tamely heading the ball towards the back of the net via a desperate attempt by Palace defender Joel Ward to head it off the goal line only to head it onto his own bar, ricocheting it into the net. Next, only two days later, Arsenal took the trip to the South Coast as they faced Bournemouth. Arsenal were very shaky throughout the first half and early stages of the second and goals by Charlie Daniels, Callum Wilson and Ryan Fraser helped Bournemouth take a shock 3–0 lead. However, during the final 20 minutes the Gunners mounted an emphatic comeback with Alexis Sánchez and Lucas Pérez both scoring before Simon Francis was sent off. Giroud then netted the equaliser in stoppage time to ensure a dramatic 3–3 draw. On 7 January, Arsenal started their FA Cup campaign in the third round against Championship side Preston North End at Deepdale. Once more, Arsenal were shoddy in the early minutes and fell behind in the seventh minute through poor defending; but the Gunners responded in the second half. Aaron Ramsey made it 1–1 in the very first minute of the half and Giroud's goalscoring form continued tapping home an 89th-minute winner.

On 14 January Arsenal went to South Wales for the next Premier League match and won 4–0 at Swansea. Olivier Giroud scored his fifth goal in five matches, followed by own goals by Jack Cork and Kyle Naughton, before the fourth goal was fired home by Alexis Sánchez. Eight days later Arsenal faced Burnley at the Emirates. Following a goalless first half, Shkodran Mustafi scored his first Arsenal goal, heading home from a corner on 59 minutes. Granit Xhaka was then unusually sent off by referee Jonathan Moss and in stoppage time it got much more dramatic: in the 93rd minute Burnley were awarded a penalty through which Andre Gray scored. A cruel hammer blow for Arsenal meant that it was destined for the visitors to bring back a point but then in the 97th minute the Gunners themselves were handed a penalty despite an offside appeal. Sánchez scored from the spot in the final minute of stoppage time to keep the three points in North London. The match moreover saw Arsène Wenger get sent off for complaining to the fourth official about the Burnley penalty decision. For this offense Wenger was given a domestic four match ban which made him sit on the 'naughty step' and watch assistant manager Steve Bould do the touchline duties for the next four matches. On 28 January, Arsenal played in the FA Cup fourth round at Southampton. A brace by Danny Welbeck and a hat trick by Theo Walcott made them cruise into the fifth round with a comfortable 5-0 win. Two days later Arsenal continued the Premier League campaign but they suffered a shock 2–1 home defeat by Watford. Former Tottenham defender Younès Kaboul gave the visitors the lead through a deflected strike from outside the box early in the first half and three minutes later Troy Deeney doubled Watford's advantage. In the second half Arsenal were back into it as Alex Iwobi gave the Gunners hope. Arsenal piled on the pressure for the remaining minutes and Lucas Pérez hit the bar but they were unable to get the equaliser. The match ended 2–1 to Watford as the month of January ended harshly for the Gunners.

=== February ===
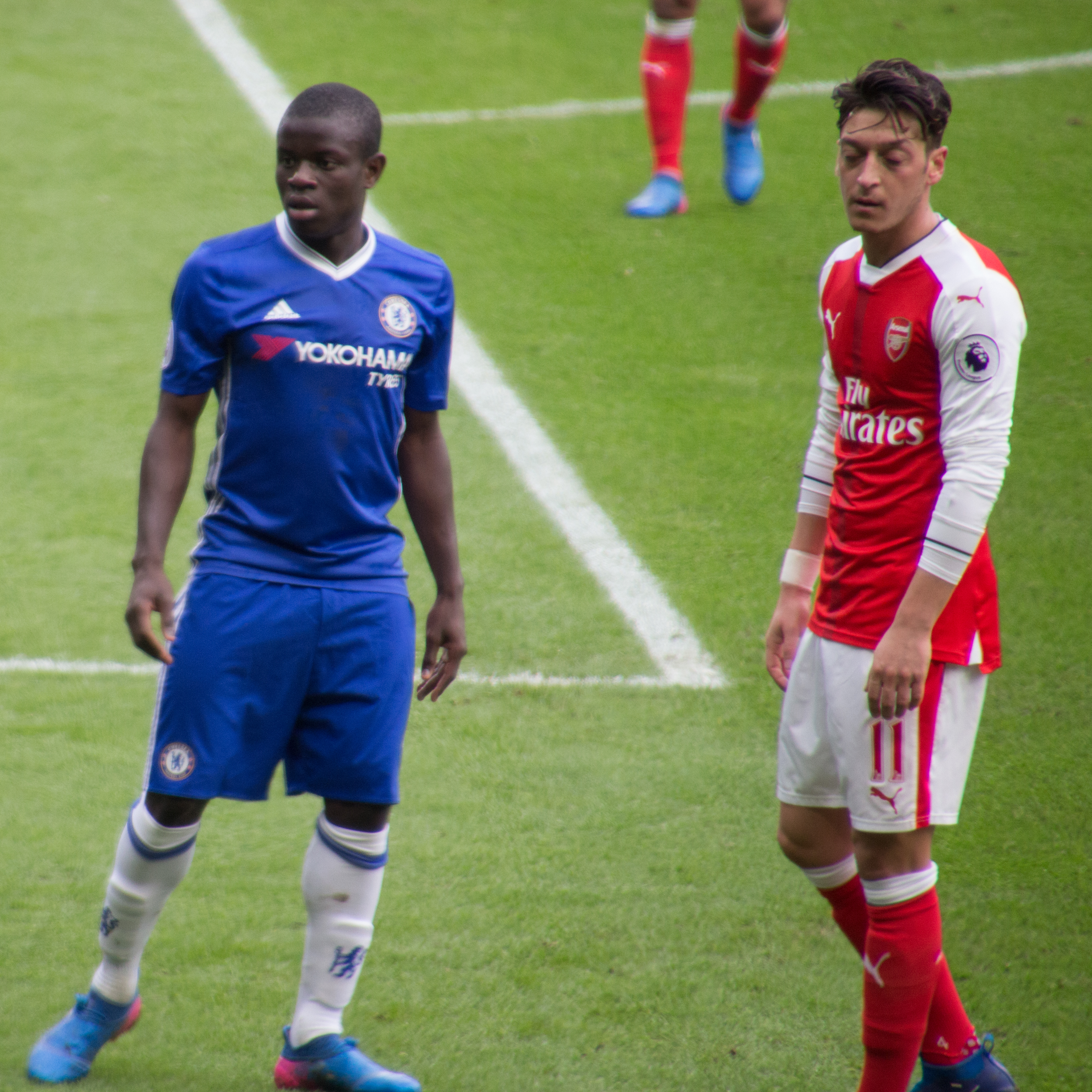
Midfielders N'Golo Kanté and Mesut Özil at Stamford Bridge, as the Arsenal renew their rivalry against Chelsea.

Arsenal's Premier League setback continued as they were beaten by Chelsea 3–1 at Stamford Bridge. Marcos Alonso scored the only goal of the first half before Eden Hazard wrapped up a fine solo goal. Cesc Fàbregas scored against his old club for Chelsea's third before Olivier Giroud netted a late consolation goal. On 11 February however the Gunners bounced back as they eased past Hull at the Emirates. In the first half Alexis Sánchez bundled home the opening goal despite replays showing the ball hit his hand before it went into the back of the net. Arsenal grabbed a second in stoppage time as Sánchez converted a 93rd-minute penalty following handball by Sam Clucas which resulted into his dismissal. Four days later Arsenal played in the knockout stage of the Champions League against German giants and five-times European champions Bayern Munich at the Allianz Arena. The Gunners were undone and under pressure by the Bayern possession and fell behind on 11 minutes through Arjen Robben's 20-yard screamer. However, in the 30th minute Arsenal were handed a penalty and Sánchez slotted home the rebound following his initial spot-kick being saved by Manuel Neuer as the first half ended 1–1 with much cherished positivity for the Gunners. Unfortunately in the second half Arsenal collapsed horrendously: first they lost captain Laurent Koscielny through injury which proved to be the catalyst for Arsenal's capitulation as they conceded three goals in ten minutes. Bayern Munich went back in front in the 53rd minute as Robert Lewandowski mismatched Shkodran Mustafi to head home Philipp Lahm's cross. Then, only three minutes later, Spanish midfielder Thiago made it 3–1 and sooner Bayern Munich were 4–1 up through Thiago's deflected shot from outside the penalty area following a scramble in the box. Finally in the 88th minute Thomas Müller, who had only scored four goals this season before the match, went off the bench and scored a fifth goal for Bayern Munich to put Arsenal's hopes of reaching the quarter-final of the Champions League beyond them. The match ended 5–1 to Bayern Munich putting Arsène Wenger under huge pressure. On 20 February Arsenal resumed the FA Cup campaign as they took the trip to non-league team Sutton United. The Gunners comfortably won 2–0 with Lucas Pérez scoring his 7th goal of the season and Theo Walcott scoring his 100th Arsenal goal as they progressed into the FA Cup quarter-final.

=== March ===
Arsenal started March away to Liverpool and suffered a 3–1 defeat with goals from Roberto Firmino, Sadio Mané and Georginio Wijnaldum. Arsene Wenger drew much criticism from supporters following his decision to leave Alexis Sánchez out of the starting lineup. Three days later, Bayern Munich, already 5–1 up from the first leg of the Champions League knockout stage came to the Emirates for the second leg. Arsenal started brightly and went into half-time winning 1–0 courtesy of Theo Walcott. However, early on in the second half, Laurent Koscielny gave away a penalty for a foul on Robert Lewandowski and was shown a yellow card. However, referee Anastasios Sidiropoulos then changed his mind and sent-off Koscielny. Lewandowski scored the penalty and then Bayern proceeded to run riot against 10-man Arsenal and goals from Arjen Robben, Douglas Costa and a brace from Arturo Vidal ensured Bayern again won 5–1. Arsenal lost 10–2 on aggregate and Wenger had to endure increasing calls for him to be sacked or resign. At the weekend, though Arsenal beat non-league Lincoln City 5–0 in the FA Cup to set up a semi-final against Manchester City at Wembley. However, Arsenal's poor form throughout 2017 continued in the league as they were soundly beaten 3–1 away to West Bromwich Albion, putting their hopes of a top four finish in serious doubt.

=== April ===
After the international break, Arsenal returned to action with an exciting 2–2 draw at home to Manchester City. After the game there was an outbreak of violence between supporters who wanted Wenger to remain as manager and supporters who wanted him to leave. In the next fixture against West Ham, three second-half goals from Mesut Özil, Theo Walcott and Olivier Giroud gave Arsenal their first league win since February. This was undone however the following week when they lost 3–0 away to Crystal Palace, who were fighting for Premier League survival. The result put Arsenal seven points off fourth place and fans chanted "you're not fit to wear the shirt" at the team. To rectify the decline, for the next match away to Middlesbrough, Wenger decided to change the formation to 3–4–3 which eventual champions Chelsea had been playing with for almost the whole season. It worked as Arsenal won 2–1 with goals from Alexis Sánchez and Mesut Özil. Arsenal's next outing would be against Manchester City at Wembley in the semi-final of the FA Cup. Manchester City came into the match as favourites and Sergio Aguero put them in front after the hour. 10 minutes later, wing-back Nacho Monreal equalised and the game went to extra-time where Alexis Sánchez scored the winning goal to book Arsenal's place in the final against Chelsea. Their improvement in form was highlighted three days later when they beat Leicester 1–0 with a late Robert Huth own goal. However, their decline was also shown when they lost 2–0 to Spurs in the last ever North London Derby to take place at White Hart Lane before its demolition. The result meant Spurs would finish above Arsenal for the first time in over 20 years.

=== May ===
After the morale-sapping defeat at White Hart Lane, the Gunners played host to Manchester United in a critical match at the Emirates Stadium. After a goalless first period, Granit Xhaka's wildly deflected effort soared into the net, before Danny Welbeck nodded home three minutes later to seal a vital 2–0 victory and subsequently end United's 25-match unbeaten run in all competitions.

The Gunners' next match was away to Southampton, and second-half goals from Alexis Sanchez and Olivier Giroud earned Arsenal a routine 2–0 victory, before Giroud scored a brace to lay the foundations for a convincing 4–1 win at Stoke City, with Sanchez and Ozil also scoring either side of a Peter Crouch goal.

With the top four still a valid hope, Arsenal played host to Sunderland, and despite winning the match 2–0, had to work hard for the three points, earned with Alexis Sanchez's late brace.

Coming into the final matchday, Arsenal were tipped to fail in their top-four bids as they were relying on slip-ups from Liverpool or Manchester City, who were playing Middlesbrough at home and Watford away, respectively.

Nonetheless, the Gunners made the perfect start, with Hector Bellerin rifling home after just eight minutes against Everton. However, a red-card for Laurent Koscielny hindered Arsenal's progress, but Sanchez nonetheless managed to extend the lead before the break. Despite Romelu Lukaku's penalty cutting the deficit to 2–1, a fine, curling finish from Aaron Ramsey in stoppage time sealed a 3–1 win; but it was all in vain, as Liverpool's 3–0 triumph over Middlesbrough and Manchester City's 5-0 drubbing of Watford meant Arsenal finished outside of the top four for the first time in Arsène Wenger's reign.

Despite missing out on Champions League qualification, Arsenal still had the FA Cup final at Wembley to look forward to, and Alexis Sanchez gave them the perfect start after just four minutes against Chelsea, who were looking to win the Double. However, despite being reduced to ten men after Victor Moses's red card early in the second half, Chelsea managed to equalise on 76 minutes through an improvised Diego Costa volley. However, just three minutes later, Aaron Ramsey powered home Olivier Giroud's cross with a solid header to seal a 2–1 win, and with it, a record 13th FA Cup for Arsenal and Arsène Weneger's seventh winners medal as a turbulent and difficult season ended on a high.

== Players ==
=== Squad information ===
N	Pos.	Nat.	Name	Age	EU	Since	App	Goals	Ends	Transfer fee	Notes
1	GK	(Poland)	Wojciech Szczęsny	27	EU	2009 (Winter)	181	0	undisclosed	Youth system	On loan to Roma
2	DF	(France)	Mathieu Debuchy	31	EU	2014	23	1	undisclosed	£12.0M	
3	DF	(England)	Kieran Gibbs	27	EU	2007	230	6	undisclosed	Youth system	
4	DF	(Germany)	Per Mertesacker	32	EU	2011	210	8	undisclosed	£8.0M	
5	DF	(Brazil)	Gabriel Paulista	26	Non-EU	2015 (Winter)	65	1	undisclosed	£11.3M	
6	DF	(France)	Laurent Koscielny	31	EU	2010	291	22	undisclosed	£8.5M	
7	FW	(Chile)	Alexis Sánchez	28	Non-EU	2014	145	72	undisclosed	£30.0M	
8	MF	(Wales)	Aaron Ramsey	26	EU	2008	297	47	undisclosed	£4.8M	
9	FW	(Spain)	Lucas Pérez	28	EU	2016	21	7	undisclosed	£17.1M	
10	MF	(England)	Jack Wilshere	25	EU	2008	159	12	2018	Youth system	On loan to AFC Bournemouth
11	MF	(Germany)	Mesut Özil	28	EU	2013	162	32	undisclosed	£42.5M	
12	FW	(France)	Olivier Giroud	30	EU	2012	227	98	undisclosed	£12.8M	
13	GK	(Colombia)	David Ospina	28	Non-EU	2014	50	0	undisclosed	£3.2M (EUR 4m)	
14	FW	(England)	Theo Walcott	28	EU	2006 (Winter)	381	104	2019	£9.0M	
15	MF	(England)	Alex Oxlade-Chamberlain	23	EU	2011	194	20	undisclosed	£12.0M	
16	DF	(England)	Rob Holding	21	EU	2016	18	0	undisclosed	£2.0M	
17	FW	(Nigeria)	Alex Iwobi	21	EU	2015	59	6	undisclosed	Youth system	
18	DF	(Spain)	Nacho Monreal	31	EU	2013 (Winter)	174	3	undisclosed	£8.5M	
19	MF	(Spain)	Santi Cazorla	32	EU	2012	180	29	undisclosed	£12.0M	
20	DF	(Germany)	Shkodran Mustafi	25	EU	2016	37	2	undisclosed	£35.0M	
21	DF	(England)	Calum Chambers	22	EU	2014	60	3	undisclosed	£16.0m	On loan to Middlesbrough
22	FW	(France)	Yaya Sanogo	24	EU	2013	20	1	undisclosed	Free	
23	FW	(England)	Danny Welbeck	26	EU	2014	69	17	2019	£16.0M	
24	DF	(Spain)	Héctor Bellerín	22	EU	2013	115	4	undisclosed	Youth system	
25	DF	(England)	Carl Jenkinson	25	EU	2011	62	1	undisclosed	£1.0M	
26	GK	(Argentina)	Emiliano Martínez	24	Non-EU	2012	13	0	undisclosed	Youth system	
28	FW	(Costa Rica)	Joel Campbell	24	Non-EU	2011	41	4	undisclosed	£0.9M	On loan to Sporting CP
29	MF	(Switzerland)	Granit Xhaka	24	Non-EU	2016	46	4	undisclosed	£30.0M	
31	MF	(France)	Jeff Reine-Adélaïde	19	EU	2016	8	0	undisclosed	Youth system	
32	FW	(England)	Chuba Akpom	21	EU	2013	10	0	undisclosed	Youth system	On loan to Brighton & Hove Albion
33	GK	(Czech Republic)	Petr Čech	35	EU	2015	79	0	2019	£10.0M	
34	MF	(France)	Francis Coquelin	26	EU	2008	148	0	undisclosed	Youth system	
35	MF	(Egypt)	Mohamed Elneny	24	Non-EU	2016 (Winter)	41	1	undisclosed	£7.4M	
—	FW	(Japan)	Takuma Asano	22	Non-EU	2016	0	0	undisclosed	£0.8M	On loan to VfB Stuttgart

- Last updated: 27 May 2017
- Source: Arsenal F.C. and footballdatabase.com (for EU passport, country as international player, contract ending and transfer fee)
- Ordered by squad number.

== Transfers ==
=== Transfers in ===
Arsenal started its transfer business early, acquiring Swiss midfielder Granit Xhaka for a reported £30 million from Borussia Mönchengladbach on 25 May. Arsenal continued their recruitment in July, signing young forward Takuma Asano from Sanfrecce Hiroshima for an undisclosed fee, widely believed to be £800,000. On 22 July, Arsenal confirmed their third summer signing in Rob Holding, with the defender joining from Bolton Wanderers for a reported fee of £2 million. The club would later sign Nigerian prospect Kelechi Nwakali, who joined the Arsenal reserve team on a five-year deal. Arsenal would move for Lucas Pérez and Shkodran Mustafi late in the transfer window, with the La Liga duo eventually joining for a reported £17.1 million and £35 million respectively.

#	Position	Player	Transferred from	Fee	Date	Team	Source
29	MF	(Switzerland) Granit Xhaka	(Germany) Borussia Mönchengladbach	Undisclosed (~£30,000,000)	25 May 2016	First team	
—	FW	(Japan) Takuma Asano	(Japan) Sanfrecce Hiroshima	Undisclosed (~£800,000)	3 July 2016	First team	
16	DF	(England) Rob Holding	(England) Bolton Wanderers	Undisclosed (~£2,000,000)	22 July 2016	First team	
—	MF	(Nigeria) Kelechi Nwakali	(Nigeria) Diamond Football Academy	Undisclosed (~£3,000,000)	5 August 2016	Reserves	
9	FW	(Spain) Lucas Pérez	(Spain) Deportivo La Coruña	Undisclosed (~£17,100,000)	30 August 2016	First team	
20	DF	(Germany) Shkodran Mustafi	(Spain) Valencia	Undisclosed (~£35,000,000)	30 August 2016	First team	
85	DF	(England) Cohen Bramall	(England) Hednesford Town	Undisclosed (~£40,000)	10 January 2017	Reserves	

Total spending: ▼ Undisclosed (~£87,940,000)

=== Transfers out ===
#	Position	Player	Transferred to	Fee	Date	Team	Source
8	MF	(Spain) Mikel Arteta	Retired (Note: Upon the expiry of Arteta's contract, he retired and joined Manchester City in a coaching position.)	n/a	30 June 2016	First team	
20	MF	(France) Mathieu Flamini	(England) Crystal Palace (Note: Upon the expiry of Flamini's contract, he joined Crystal Palace.)	Free transfer (Released)	30 June 2016	First team	
7	MF	(Czech Republic) Tomáš Rosický	(Czech Republic) Sparta Prague (Note: Upon the expiry of Rosický's contract, he signed for Sparta Prague.)	Free transfer (Released)	30 June 2016	First team	
42	DF	(England) Isaac Hayden	(England) Newcastle United	Undisclosed (~£2,500,000)	11 July 2016	First team	
—	MF	(Brazil) Wellington Silva	(Brazil) Fluminense	Undisclosed	18 July 2016	Reserves	
—	DF	(Greece) Ilias Chatzitheodoridis	(England) Brentford	Free transfer	6 August 2016	Reserves	
27	MF	(Germany) Serge Gnabry	(Germany) Werder Bremen	Undisclosed (~£5,000,000)	31 August 2016	First team	
—	MF	(England) Tyrell Robinson	(England) Bradford City (Note: Upon the expiry of Robinson's contract, he joined Bradford City.)	Free transfer (Released)	2 February 2017	Reserves	

Total incoming: ▲ Undisclosed (~£7,500,000+)

=== Loans in ===
#	Position	Player	Loaned from	Date	Loan expires	Team	Source

=== Loans out ===
#	Position	Player	Loaned to	Date	Loan expires	Team	Source
38	MF	(England) Daniel Crowley	(England) Oxford United	1 July 2016	1 December 2016 (Note: On 1 December 2016, Oxford United chose to cut short Daniel Crowley's loan deal.)	Reserves	
43	GK	(England) Ryan Huddart	(England) Eastleigh	1 July 2016	30 June 2017	Reserves	
57	MF	(Spain) Jon Toral	(Spain) Granada	15 July 2016	10 January 2017 (Note: On 10 January 2017, Jon Toral was recalled from his loan at Granada.)	Reserves	
1	GK	(Poland) Wojciech Szczęsny	(Italy) Roma	4 August 2016	30 June 2017	First team	
52	DF	(England) Stefan O'Connor	(Netherlands) Maastricht	5 August 2016	30 June 2017	Reserves	
53	DF	(Spain) Julio Pleguezuelo	(Spain) Mallorca	5 August 2016	30 June 2017	Reserves	
59	DF	(England) Tafari Moore	(Netherlands) Jong FC Utrecht	17 August 2016	30 June 2017	Reserves	
28	FW	(Costa Rica) Joel Campbell	(Portugal) Sporting CP	21 August 2016	30 June 2017	First team	
—	FW	(Japan) Takuma Asano	(Germany) Stuttgart	26 August 2016	30 June 2017	First team	
21	DF	(England) Calum Chambers	(England) Middlesbrough	30 August 2016	30 June 2017	First team	
—	MF	(Nigeria) Kelechi Nwakali	(Netherlands) Maastricht	31 August 2016	30 June 2017	Reserves	
52	MF	(Finland) Glen Kamara	(England) Colchester United	31 August 2016	1 January 2017	Reserves	
10	MF	(England) Jack Wilshere	(England) AFC Bournemouth (Note: AFC Bournemouth paid a £2,000,000 loan fee.)	31 August 2016	30 June 2017	First team	
38	MF	(England) Daniel Crowley	(Netherlands) Go Ahead Eagles	10 January 2017	30 June 2017	Reserves	
57	MF	(Spain) Jon Toral	(Scotland) Rangers	12 January 2017	30 June 2017	Reserves	
40	MF	(United States) Gedion Zelalem	(Netherlands) VVV Venlo	24 January 2017	30 June 2017	Reserves	
32	FW	(England) Chuba Akpom	(England) Brighton & Hove Albion	30 January 2017	30 June 2017	First team	
37	DF	(Poland) Krystian Bielik	(England) Birmingham City	31 January 2017	30 June 2017	Reserves	
38	DF	(England) Marc Bola	(England) Notts County	31 January 2017	30 June 2017	Reserves	
44	DF	(England) Aaron Eyoma	(Netherlands) Volendam	31 January 2017	30 June 2017	Reserves	
48	FW	(England) Kaylen Hinds	(England) Stevenage	31 January 2017	30 June 2017	Reserves	
54	GK	(England) Matt Macey	(England) Luton Town	31 January 2017	30 June 2017	Reserves	
57	FW	(England) Stephy Mavididi	(England) Charlton Athletic	31 January 2017	30 June 2017	Reserves	

=== Overall transfer activity ===
Spending

Summer: ▼ Undisclosed (~£87,900,000)

Winter: ▼ Undisclosed (~£40,000)

Total: ▼ Undisclosed (~£87,940,000)

Income

Summer: ▲ Undisclosed (~£7,500,000+)

Winter: £0

Total: ▲ Undisclosed (~£7,500,000+)

Net expenditure

Summer: ▼ Undisclosed (~£80,400,000-)

Winter: ▼ Undisclosed (~£40,000)

Total: ▼ Undisclosed (~£80,440,000-)

== Club ==
=== Coaching staff ===
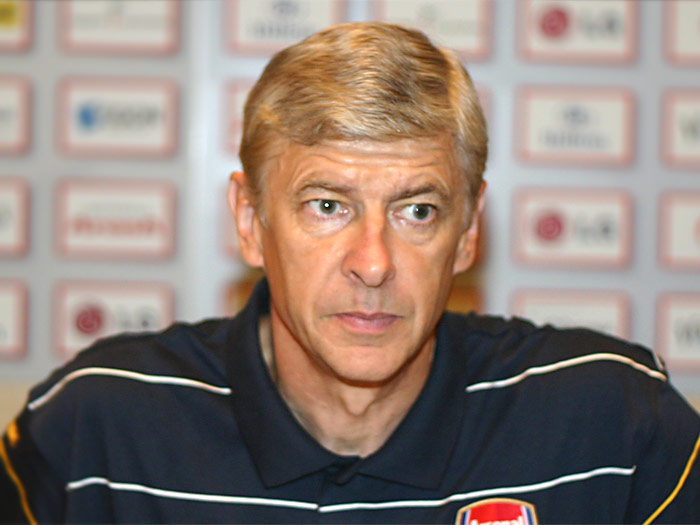
This was Arsène Wenger's 21st season with Arsenal.

Position	Staff
Manager	(France) Arsène Wenger
Assistant manager	(England) Steve Bould
First team coach	(Bosnia and Herzegovina) Boro Primorac (England) Neil Banfield
Goalkeeping coach	(Republic of Ireland) Gerry Peyton
Head of athletic performance enhancement	(United States) Shad Forsythe
Fitness coach	(England) Tony Colbert (England) Craig Gant
Physiotherapist	(England) Colin Lewin (England) Ben Ashworth (England) Andrew Rolls
Club doctor	(Republic of Ireland) Gary O'Driscoll
Head of academy	(Netherlands) Andries Jonker
Masseur	(England) Darren Page (England) Chris Harvey (England) Chris Senior
Kit manager	(England) Vic Akers
Assistant Kit manager	(England) Paul Akers
Equipment manager	(England) Paul Johnson
Performance nutritionist	(England) James Collins
Football analyst	(England) Ben Knapper

Last updated: 1 July 2015
Source: Arsenal F.C.

=== Kit ===
Supplier: Puma / Sponsor: Fly Emirates

Home	Away	Third	Third alt. 1	Third alt. 2

=== Kit information ===
This is third consecutive season Puma has supplied Arsenal with kits.

- Home: The home kit features Arsenal's traditional colours of red and white, with the addition of a dark trim around the lowered neck line, on the sleeve (hooped) and along the red stripe on the shorts. The distinguishing feature of the kit is the darkened, vertical, red stripe across the centre of the kit. It also features predominantly red socks for the first time since the 2004–05 season (as opposed to only featuring on the alternate kits).
- Away: The away kit is predominantly yellow following the trend of recent Arsenal away kits. The contrasting colour is "gunmetal grey" which appears on the collar (alongside a thin, centred, yellow line), as a trim on the v-shaped neck line and on the sleeve, separated by a large yellow strip across the shoulders and multiple hooped yellow lines across the bottom section of the sleeve. The shorts are predominantly gunmetal grey, with a yellow trim along the sides. The socks are yellow with multiple gunmetal grey hooped lines on the upper section.
- Third: The third kit is an abstraction from previous alternate kits for Arsenal as it predominantly features a single colour of dark blue. A vibrant neon yellow forms the detail across a wide strip on the shoulder and on the cuffs of the sleeves. The shorts are also dark blue with neon yellow detail along the sides and the kit is completed with single-colour neon yellow socks with a single dark blue hoop on the upper section.

=== Other information ===
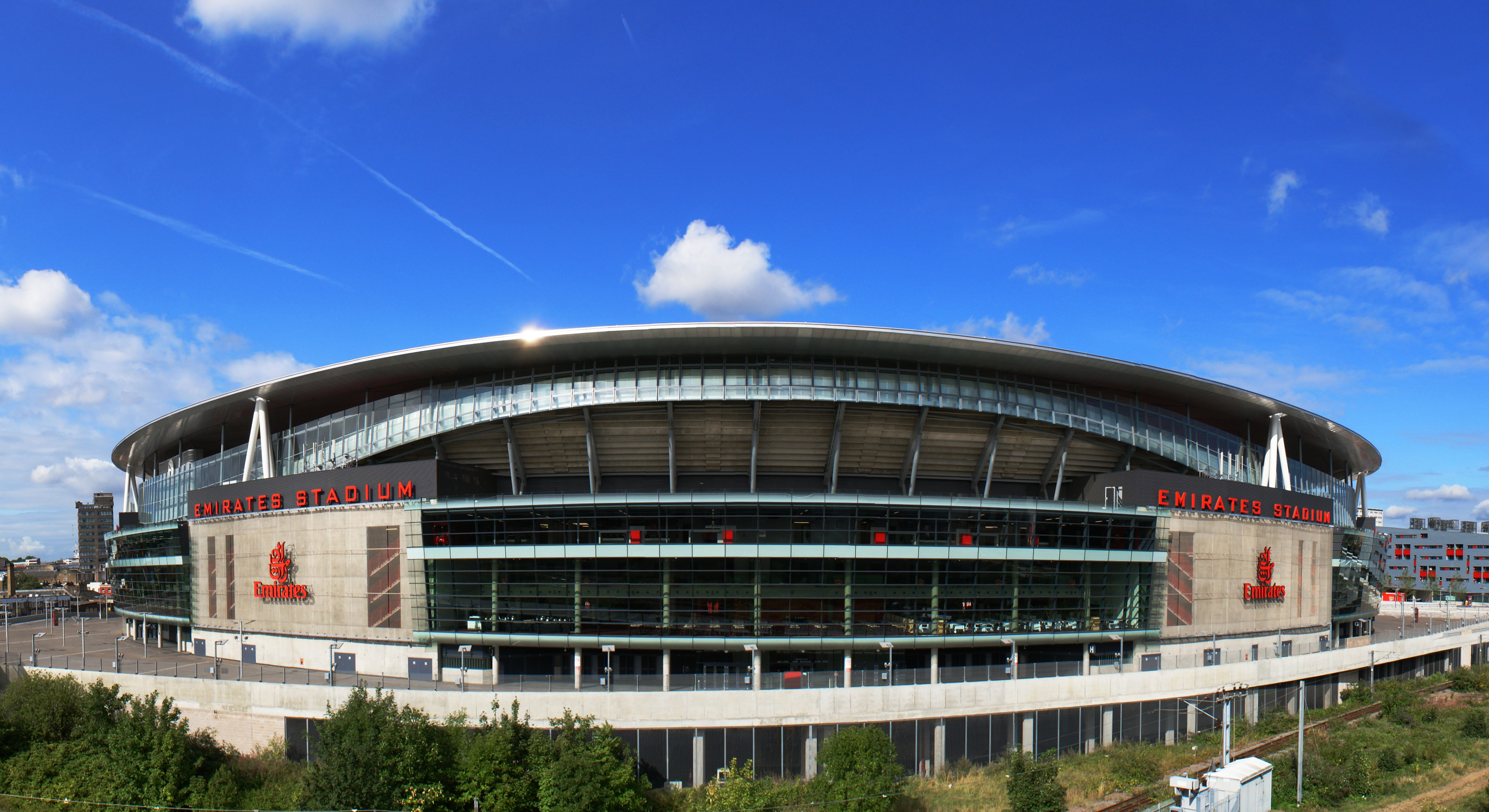
The Emirates Stadium is the second largest stadium in the Premier League.

Chairman	(England) Sir Chips Keswick
Ground (capacity and dimensions)	Emirates Stadium (60,355 / 113x76 metres)

Updated to match played 30 May 2014
Source: Arsenal F.C.

== Squad statistics ==
=== Appearances and goals ===
Numbers in parentheses denote appearances as substitute.

No.	Pos.	Nat.	Name	Premier League		FA Cup		EFL Cup		Champions League		Total	
No.	Pos.	Nat.	Name	Apps	Goals	Apps	Goals	Apps	Goals	Apps	Goals	Apps	Goals
2	DF	FRA	Mathieu Debuchy	1	0	0	0	0	0	0	0	1	0
3	DF	ENG	Kieran Gibbs	8 (3)	0	2	0	3	0	5 (1)	0	18 (4)	0
4	DF	GER	Per Mertesacker	0 (1)	0	1	0	0	0	0	0	1 (1)	0
5	DF	BRA	Gabriel Paulista	15 (4)	0	3	0	3	0	1 (1)	0	22 (5)	0
6	DF	FRA	Laurent Koscielny	33	2	2	0	0	0	8	0	43	2
7	FW	CHI	Alexis Sánchez	36 (2)	24	3 (2)	3	0	0	8	3	47 (4)	30
8	MF	WAL	Aaron Ramsey	13 (10)	1	4	3	1	0	4	0	22 (10)	4
9	FW	ESP	Lucas Pérez	2 (9)	1	3 (1)	1	3	2	1 (2)	3	9 (12)	7
11	MF	GER	Mesut Özil	32 (1)	8	2 (1)	0	0	0	7 (1)	4	41 (3)	12
12	FW	FRA	Olivier Giroud	11 (18)	12	3 (1)	2	0 (1)	0	3 (3)	2	17 (23)	16
13	GK	COL	David Ospina	1 (1)	0	4	0	0	0	8	0	13 (1)	0
14	FW	ENG	Theo Walcott	23 (5)	10	3	5	0	0	3 (3)	4	29 (8)	19
15	MF	ENG	Alex Oxlade-Chamberlain	16 (13)	2	5 (1)	0	2	3	4 (3)	1	27 (18)	6
16	DF	ENG	Rob Holding	9	0	4 (1)	0	3	0	1	0	17 (1)	0
17	FW	NGA	Alex Iwobi	18 (8)	3	2 (1)	0	2	0	5 (2)	1	27 (11)	4
18	DF	ESP	Nacho Monreal	35 (1)	0	4	1	0	0	3	0	42 (1)	1
19	MF	ESP	Santi Cazorla	7 (1)	2	0	0	0	0	3	0	10 (1)	2
20	DF	GER	Shkodran Mustafi	26	2	4	0	0	0	7	0	37	2
23	FW	ENG	Danny Welbeck	8 (8)	2	3 (1)	2	0	0	0	0	10 (10)	4
24	DF	ESP	Héctor Bellerín	28 (6)	1	4	0	0	0	5	0	35 (7)	1
25	DF	ENG	Carl Jenkinson	1	0	0	0	2	0	2	0	5	0
26	GK	ARG	Emiliano Martínez	2	0	0	0	3	0	0	0	5	0
29	MF	SUI	Granit Xhaka	28 (4)	2	5	0	1 (1)	1	5 (2)	1	39 (7)	4
31	MF	FRA	Jeff Reine-Adélaïde	0	0	2 (1)	0	3	0	0	0	5 (1)	0
33	GK	CZE	Petr Čech	35	0	2	0	0	0	0	0	37	0
34	MF	FRA	Francis Coquelin	22 (7)	0	0 (3)	0	1	0	5 (1)	0	28 (11)	0
35	MF	EGY	Mohamed Elneny	8 (6)	0	1 (1)	0	3	0	0 (5)	0	12 (12)	0
55	MF	ENG	Ainsley Maitland-Niles	0 (1)	0	2 (1)	0	2 (1)	0	0	0	4 (3)	0
68	MF	ENG	Chris Willock	0	0	0	0	0 (2)	0	0	0	0 (2)	0
Players out on loan for rest of the season
10	MF	ENG	Jack Wilshere	0 (2)	0	0	0	0	0	0	0	0 (2)	0
21	DF	ENG	Calum Chambers	1	1	0	0	0	0	0	0	1	1
32	FW	ENG	Chuba Akpom	0	0	0	0	1	0	0	0	1	0
37	DF	POL	Krystian Bielik	0	0	0	0	0 (1)	0	0	0	0 (1)	0
40	MF	USA	Gedion Zelalem	0	0	0	0	0 (2)	0	0	0	0 (2)	0

=== Goalscorers ===
As of 27 May 2017

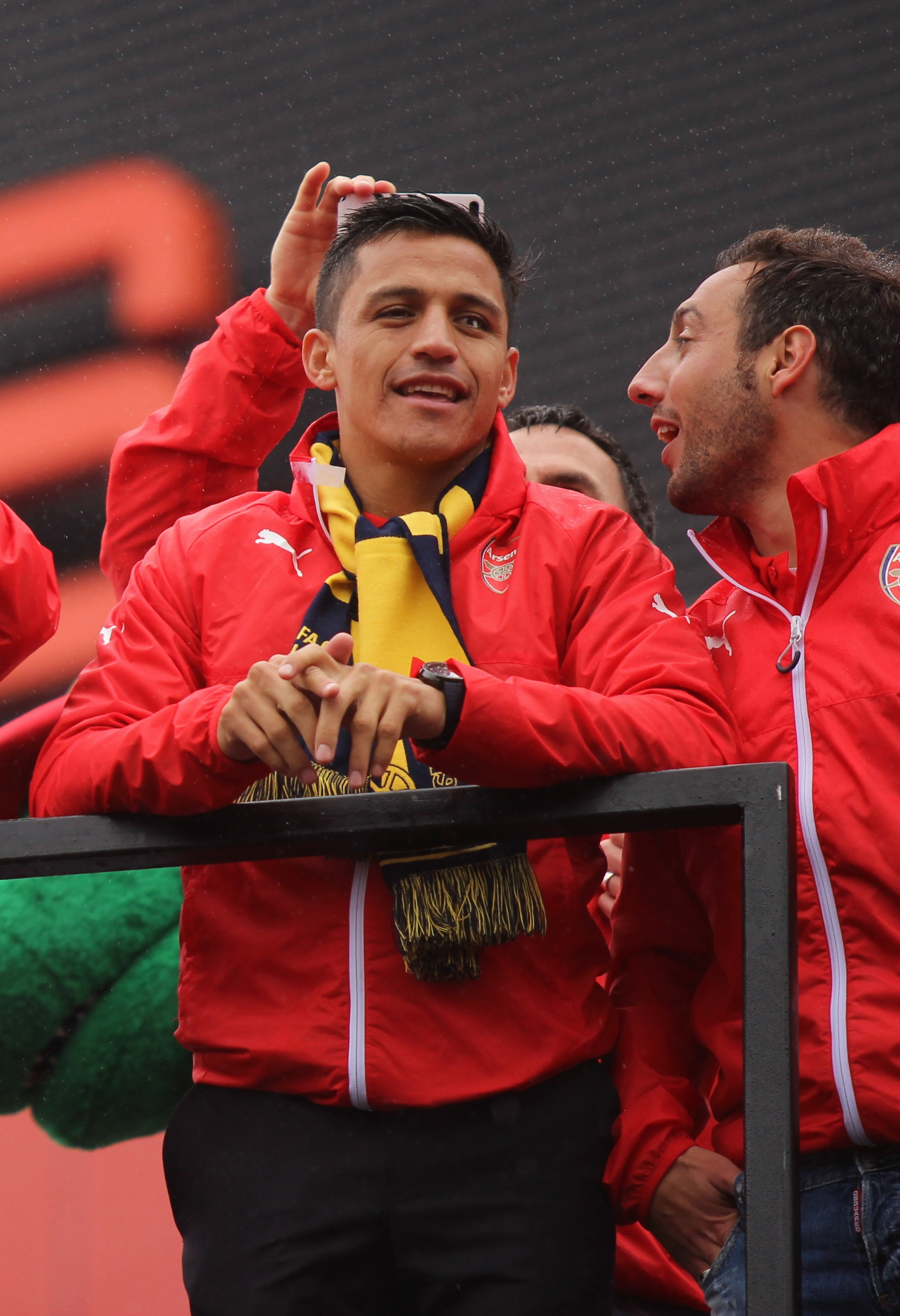
Alexis Sánchez was Arsenal's top scorer, with 30 goals in all competitions.

Rank	Position	Name	Premier League	FA Cup	EFL Cup	Champions League	Total
1	FW	(Chile) Alexis Sánchez	24	3	0	3	30
2	FW	(England) Theo Walcott	10	5	0	4	19
3	FW	(France) Olivier Giroud	12	2	0	2	16
4	MF	(Germany) Mesut Özil	8	0	0	4	12
5	FW	(Spain) Lucas Pérez	1	1	2	3	7
6	MF	(England) Alex Oxlade-Chamberlain	2	0	3	1	6
7	FW	(Nigeria) Alex Iwobi	3	0	0	1	4
7	MF	(Wales) Aaron Ramsey	1	3	0	0	4
7	FW	(England) Danny Welbeck	2	2	0	0	4
7	MF	(Switzerland) Granit Xhaka	2	0	1	1	4
11	MF	(Spain) Santi Cazorla	2	0	0	0	2
11	DF	(France) Laurent Koscielny	2	0	0	0	2
11	DF	(Germany) Shkodran Mustafi	2	0	0	0	2
14	DF	(Spain) Héctor Bellerín	1	0	0	0	1
14	DF	(England) Calum Chambers	1	0	0	0	1
14	DF	(Spain) Nacho Monreal	0	1	0	0	1
Own goals			4	1	0	1	6
Total			77	18	6	20	121

=== Disciplinary record ===
As of 27 May 2017

Rank	Position	Name	Premier League		FA Cup		EFL Cup		Champions League		Total	
Rank	Position	Name	Yellow card	Red card	Yellow card	Red card	Yellow card	Red card	Yellow card	Red card	Yellow card	Red card
1	MF	(Switzerland) Granit Xhaka	5	2	4	0	0	0	3	0	12	2
2	DF	(France) Laurent Koscielny	4	1	1	0	0	0	1	1	6	2
3	FW	(France) Olivier Giroud	2	0	0	0	0	0	0	1	2	1
4	DF	(Germany) Shkodran Mustafi	10	0	0	0	0	0	1	0	11	0
5	MF	(France) Francis Coquelin	5	0	0	0	0	0	3	0	8	0
5	FW	(Chile) Alexis Sánchez	6	0	1	0	0	0	1	0	8	0
7	DF	(Brazil) Gabriel Paulista	6	0	1	0	0	0	0	0	7	0
8	DF	(England) Rob Holding	3	0	1	0	1	0	0	0	5	0
8	MF	(Wales) Aaron Ramsey	4	0	1	0	0	0	0	0	5	0
10	DF	(Spain) Héctor Bellerín	4	0	0	0	0	0	0	0	4	0
10	DF	(England) Kieran Gibbs	3	0	0	0	0	0	1	0	4	0
10	DF	(Spain) Nacho Monreal	4	0	0	0	0	0	0	0	4	0
13	MF	(Spain) Santi Cazorla	2	0	0	0	0	0	0	0	2	0
13	GK	(Czech Republic) Petr Čech	2	0	0	0	0	0	0	0	2	0
13	DF	(Egypt) Mohamed Elneny	1	0	0	0	1	0	0	0	2	0
13	FW	(Nigeria) Alex Iwobi	1	0	0	0	1	0	0	0	2	0
13	DF	(England) Alex Oxlade-Chamberlain	1	0	0	0	0	0	1	0	2	0
13	MF	(Germany) Mesut Özil	2	0	0	0	0	0	1	0	2	0
13	DF	(England) Theo Walcott	1	0	0	0	0	0	1	0	2	0
20	DF	(England) Carl Jenkinson	0	0	0	0	0	0	1	0	1	0
20	FW	(Spain) Lucas Pérez	0	0	0	0	1	0	0	0	1	0
20	MF	(France) Jeff Reine-Adélaïde	0	0	1	0	0	0	0	0	1	0
20	MF	(England) Jack Wilshere	1	0	0	0	0	0	0	0	1	0
Total			67	3	10	0	4	0	13	2	94	5

=== Clean sheets ===
As of 27 May 2017

Rank	Name	Premier League	FA Cup	EFL Cup	Champions League	Total
1	(Czech Republic) Petr Čech	12	1	0	0	13
2	(Colombia) David Ospina	0	2	0	2	4
2	(Argentina) Emiliano Martínez	1	0	2	0	3
Total		13	3	2	2	20

== Pre-season ==
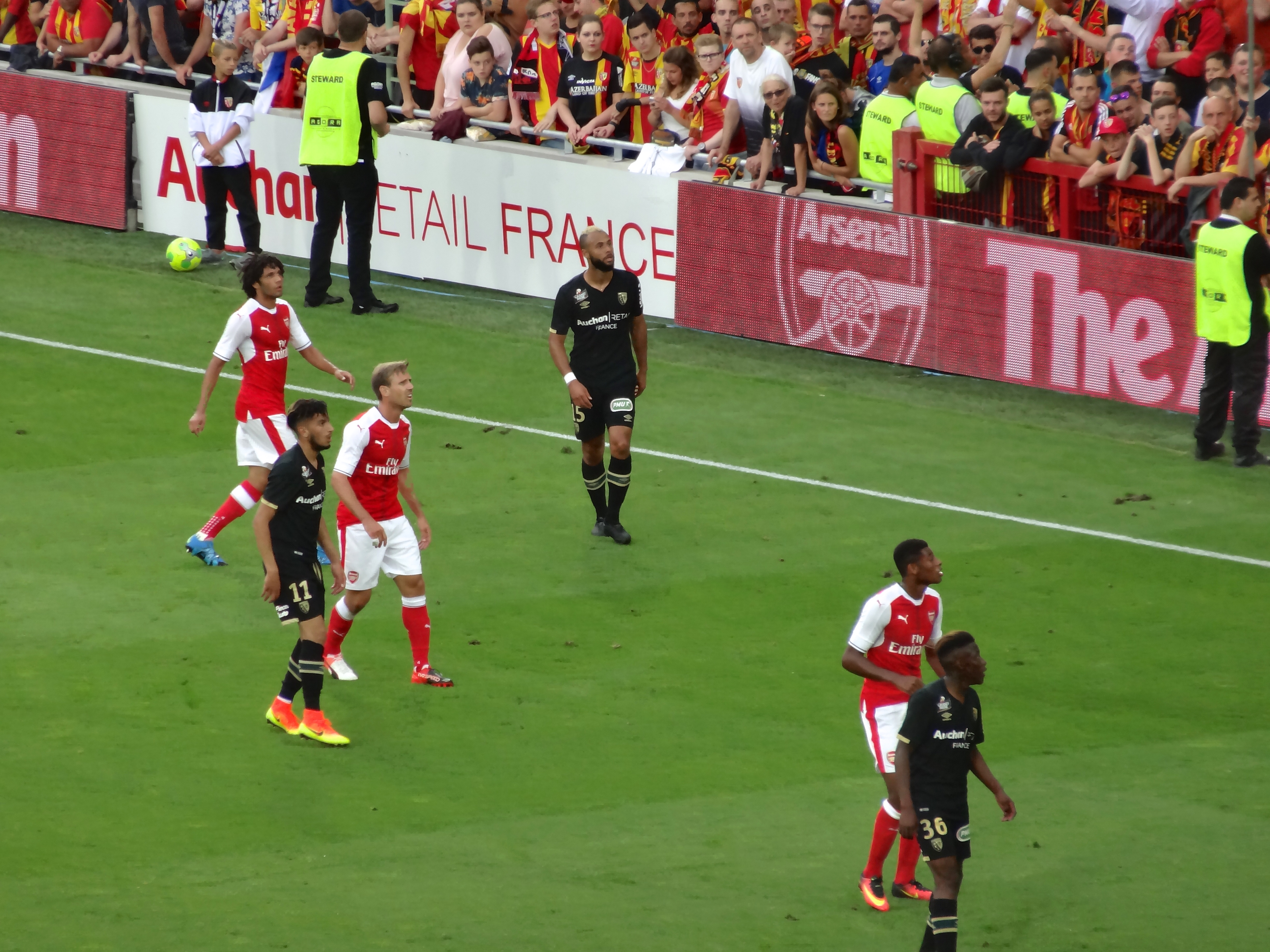
Arsenal facing Lens at the Stade Bollaert-Delelis.

In February 2016, it was announced that Arsenal would play in the Major League Soccer All-Star Game at Avaya Stadium in San Jose, California in addition to a friendly against Mexican side Guadalajara three days later. However, Arsenal later announced that the annual Emirates Cup would be cancelled for the second time in its history due to the extended absence of international players participating in Euro 2016 and "essential pitch reconstruction works" at the Emirates Stadium. Arsenal confirmed their final pre-season fixtures before the Premier League campaign in early-June 2016, as Scandinavian trips against Viking in Stavanger and Premier League rivals Manchester City in Gothenburg completed the line-up. It is the third time in four years that Arsenal and Manchester City will meet in a pre-season fixture outside of England. To complete Arsenal's pre-season calendar, in early-July, Arsenal announced their pre-season opening fixture against RC Lens of Ligue 2 to be played 15 days after the announcement date. It was hence confirmed that the club's pre-season fixture list would stretch from 22 July to 7 August 2016 (six days before the start of the Premier League season).

Win Draw Loss

22 July 2016 Friendly	Lens (France)	1–1	(England) Arsenal	Lens, France
20:00 CEST	Autret 38'	Report	Debuchy (yellow card) 43'; Oxlade-Chamberlain 81'	Stadium: Stade Bollaert-Delelis; Attendance: 30,149

31 July 2016 Friendly	Guadalajara (Mexico)	1–3	(England) Arsenal	Carson, United States
18:00 PDT	Zaldívar 74' (pen.)	Report	Holding 34'; Oxlade-Chamberlain 50'; Akpom 56'	Stadium: StubHub Center; Attendance: 24,168; Referee: Kevin Terry Jr.

5 August 2016 Friendly	Viking (Norway)	0–8	(England) Arsenal	Stavanger, Norway
20:30 CEST		Report	Campbell 33', 59'; Cazorla 50'; Walcott 52'; Haukås 55' (o.g.); Iwobi 71', 81'; Akpom 89'	Stadium: Viking Stadion; Referee: Tore Hansen

=== MLS All-Star Game ===
28 July 2016 MLS All-Star Game	MLS All-Stars (United States) (Canada)	1–2	(England) Arsenal	San Jose, United States
17:01 PDT	Ciman (yellow card) 10'; Drogba 45+2'	Report	Campbell 11' (pen.); Akpom 87'	Stadium: Avaya Stadium; Attendance: 18,000; Referee: Chris Penso

=== Super Match ===
7 August 2016 Super Match	Manchester City (England)	2–3	(England) Arsenal	Gothenburg, Sweden
17:00 CEST	Fernando (yellow card) 2'; Agüero 30', (yellow card) 55'; Iheanacho 88'	Report	Iwobi 50'; Walcott 73'; Akpom 85'	Stadium: Ullevi; Referee: Martin Strombergsson (Sweden)

== Competitions ==
=== Overview ===
Competition	Record							
Competition	Pld	W	D	L	GF	GA	GD	Win %
Premier League	38	23	6	9	77	44	+33	60.53
FA Cup	6	6	0	0	18	3	+15	100.00
EFL Cup	3	2	0	1	6	2	+4	66.67
Champions League	8	4	2	2	20	16	+4	50.00
Total	55	35	8	12	121	65	+56	63.64

Source: Competitions

=== Premier League ===
==== League table ====
Pos	Team	Pld	W	D	L	GF	GA	GD	Pts	Qualification or relegation
3	Manchester City	38	23	9	6	80	39	+41	78	Qualification for the Champions League group stage
4	Liverpool	38	22	10	6	78	42	+36	76	Qualification for the Champions League play-off round
5	Arsenal	38	23	6	9	77	44	+33	75	Qualification for the Europa League group stage (Note: Arsenal qualified for the Europa League group stage by winning the 2016–17 FA Cup. As they had also qualified there by the virtue of their league position (5th), this spot was passed to the next-highest ranked team (6th), Manchester United.)
6	Manchester United	38	18	15	5	54	29	+25	69	Qualification for the Champions League group stage (Note: Manchester United qualified for the Champions League group stage by winning the 2016–17 UEFA Europa League. Based on their league position (6th), they would have received the spot above to enter the Europa League group stage. This spot was vacated without replacement as per UEFA regulations.)
7	Everton	38	17	10	11	62	44	+18	61	Qualification for the Europa League third qualifying round (Note: Manchester United, winners of the 2016–17 EFL Cup, initially attained a spot in the Europa League third qualifying round. That was passed to the next-highest ranked team in the league not already qualified for UEFA competitions (7th-placed Everton).)

Source: Premier League
Rules for classification: 1) Points; 2) Goal difference; 3) Goals scored; 4) Play-offs (only if needed to decide champion, teams for relegation or teams for UEFA competitions).

==== Results summary ====
Overall								Home						Away					
Pld	W	D	L	GF	GA	GD	Pts	W	D	L	GF	GA	GD	W	D	L	GF	GA	GD
38	23	6	9	77	44	+33	75	14	3	2	39	16	+23	9	3	7	38	28	+10

Source: Premier League

==== Results by matchday ====
Matchday	1	2	3	4	5	6	7	8	9	10	11	12	13	14	15	16	17	18	19	20	21	22	23	24	25	26	27	28	29	30	31	32	33	34	35	36	37	38
Ground	H	A	A	H	A	H	A	H	H	A	H	A	H	A	H	A	A	H	H	A	A	H	H	A	H	A	A	H	H	A	A	H	A	H	A	A	H	H
Result	L	D	W	W	W	W	W	W	D	W	D	D	W	W	W	L	L	W	W	D	W	W	L	L	W	L	L	D	W	L	W	W	L	W	W	W	W	W
Position	15	12	7	6	4	3	3	2	1	2	4	4	4	2	1	2	4	4	3	4	3	2	3	3	3	5	5	6	5	6	6	6	6	6	5	5	5	5

Source: Statto.com
A = Away; H = Home; W = Win; D = Draw; L = Loss

==== Matches ====
On 15 June 2016, the fixtures for the forthcoming season were announced.

Win Draw Loss

14 August 2016 1	Arsenal	3–4	Liverpool	Holloway, London
16:00 BST	Walcott (penalty missed) 30' 31'; Coquelin (yellow card) 37'; Iwobi (yellow card) 58'; Oxlade-Chamberlain 64'; Chambers 75'; Xhaka (yellow card) 86'	Arsenal report BBC report	Lallana (yellow card) 26', (goal) 49'; Moreno (yellow card) 29'; Lovren (yellow card) 41'; Coutinho 45+1', 56'; Mané 63'	Stadium: Emirates Stadium; Attendance: 60,033; Referee: Michael Oliver

20 August 2016 2	Leicester City	0–0	Arsenal	Leicester
17:30 BST	Mendy (yellow card) 45'	Arsenal report BBC report	Coquelin (yellow card) 24'; Holding (yellow card) 90+2'	Stadium: King Power Stadium; Attendance: 32,008; Referee: Mark Clattenburg

27 August 2016 3	Watford	1–3	Arsenal	Watford
15:00 BST	Prödl (yellow card) 16'; Ighalo (yellow card) 45+2'; Pereyra 57'; Deeney (yellow card) 60'; Amrabat (yellow card) 77'; Behrami (yellow card) 83'; Holebas (yellow card) 89'	Arsenal report BBC report	Cazorla 9' (pen.); Sánchez 40'; Özil 45+1'; Wilshere (yellow card) 90+2'	Stadium: Vicarage Road; Attendance: 20,545; Referee: Kevin Friend

10 September 2016 4	Arsenal	2–1	Southampton	Holloway, London
15:00 BST	Monreal (yellow card) 16'; Cazorla (yellow card) 26', (goal) 90+4' (pen.); Koscielny 29'	Arsenal report BBC report	Čech 18' (o.g.); Forster (yellow card) 54'; Højbjerg (yellow card) 86'; Fonte (yellow card) 90+1'; Van Dijk (yellow card) 90+4'; Bertrand (yellow card) 90+4'	Stadium: Emirates Stadium; Attendance: 59,962; Referee: Robert Madley

17 September 2016 5	Hull City	1–4	Arsenal	Kingston upon Hull
15:00 BST	Livermore (red card) 40'; Snodgrass 79' (pen.)	Arsenal report BBC report	Sánchez 17', 83'; Cazorla (yellow card) 34'; Walcott 55'; Čech (yellow card) 78'; Xhaka 90+2'	Stadium: KCOM Stadium; Attendance: 22,536; Referee: Roger East

24 September 2016 6	Arsenal	3–0	Chelsea	Holloway, London
17:30 BST	Sánchez 11'; Walcott 14'; Özil 40'	Arsenal report BBC report	Ivanović (yellow card) 28'; Costa (yellow card) 83'	Stadium: Emirates Stadium; Attendance: 60,028; Referee: Michael Oliver

2 October 2016 7	Burnley	0–1	Arsenal	Burnley
16:30 BST		Arsenal report BBC report	Koscielny 90+3'	Stadium: Turf Moor; Attendance: 20,982; Referee: Craig Pawson

15 October 2016 8	Arsenal	3–2	Swansea City	Holloway, London
15:00 BST	Walcott 26', 33'; Özil 57'; Xhaka (red card) 70'	Arsenal report BBC report	Sigurðsson 38'; Taylor (yellow card) 48'; Borja 66'	Stadium: Emirates Stadium; Attendance: 60,007; Referee: Jonathan Moss

22 October 2016 9	Arsenal	0–0	Middlesbrough	Holloway, London
15:00 BST	Mustafi (yellow card) 64'	Arsenal report BBC report		Stadium: Emirates Stadium; Attendance: 59,982; Referee: Mike Dean

29 October 2016 10	Sunderland	1–4	Arsenal	Sunderland
12:30 BST	Khazri (yellow card) 30'; Ndong (yellow card) 33'; Pienaar (yellow card) 41'; Djilobodji (yellow card) 48'; Defoe 65' (pen.)	Arsenal report BBC report	Sánchez 19', 78', (yellow card) 66'; Čech (yellow card) 64'; Giroud 71', 76'; Gibbs (yellow card) 80'	Stadium: Stadium of Light; Attendance: 44,322; Referee: Martin Atkinson

6 November 2016 11	Arsenal	1–1	Tottenham Hotspur	Holloway, London
12:00 GMT	Wimmer 42' (o.g.); Koscielny (yellow card) 69'	Arsenal report BBC report	Wimmer (yellow card) 6'; Kane 51' (pen.); Dier (yellow card) 73'	Stadium: Emirates Stadium; Attendance: 60,039; Referee: Mark Clattenburg

19 November 2016 12	Manchester United	1–1	Arsenal	Manchester
12:30 GMT	Darmian (yellow card) 25'; Mata 69', (yellow card) 69'; Rooney (yellow card) 90+4'	Arsenal report BBC report	Sánchez (yellow card) 16'; Ramsey (yellow card) 86'; Giroud 89'; Xhaka (yellow card) 90+2'	Stadium: Old Trafford; Attendance: 75,264; Referee: Andre Marriner

27 November 2016 13	Arsenal	3–1	Bournemouth	Holloway, London
14:15 GMT	Sánchez 12', 90+1', (yellow card) 62'; Mustafi (yellow card) 22'; Walcott 53'; Gabriel (yellow card) 90+3'	Arsenal report BBC report	S. Cook (yellow card) 4'; Francis (yellow card) 7'; C. Wilson 23' (pen.); Arter (yellow card) 73'; B. Smith (yellow card) 80'; Gosling (yellow card) 88'	Stadium: Emirates Stadium; Attendance: 59,978; Referee: Mike Jones

3 December 2016 14	West Ham United	1–5	Arsenal	Stratford, London
17:30 GMT	Fletcher (yellow card) 59'; Reid (yellow card) 65'; Carroll 83'; Arbeloa (yellow card) 90+3'	Arsenal report BBC report	Özil 24'; Coquelin (yellow card) 30'; Koscielny (yellow card) 67'; Sánchez 72', 80', 86'; Mustafi (yellow card) 82'; Oxlade-Chamberlain 84'	Stadium: Olympic Stadium; Attendance: 56,980; Referee: Craig Pawson

10 December 2016 15	Arsenal	3–1	Stoke City	Holloway, London
15:00 GMT	Walcott 42'; Özil 49'; Iwobi 75'	Arsenal report BBC report	Adam 29' (pen.)	Stadium: Emirates Stadium; Attendance: 59,964; Referee: Lee Mason

13 December 2016 16	Everton	2–1	Arsenal	Liverpool
19:45 GMT	Jagielka (yellow card) 18' (yellow-red card) 90+3'; McCarthy (yellow card) 42'; Coleman 44'; Williams 86'	Arsenal report BBC report	Sánchez 20'; Koscielny (yellow card) 84'	Stadium: Goodison Park; Referee: Mark Clattenburg

18 December 2016 17	Manchester City	2–1	Arsenal	Manchester
16:00 GMT	Silva (yellow card) 38'; Sané 47'; Touré (yellow card) 51'; Sterling 71'; De Bruyne (yellow card) 80'; Fernando (yellow card) 90+5'	Arsenal report BBC report	Walcott 5'; Elneny (yellow card) 88'; Gabriel (yellow card) 90+4'	Stadium: City of Manchester Stadium; Referee: Martin Atkinson

26 December 2016 18	Arsenal	1–0	West Bromwich Albion	Holloway, London
15:00 GMT	Giroud (yellow card) 42', (goal) 86'; Gibbs (yellow card) 65'; Ramsey (yellow card) 88'	Arsenal report BBC report	Foster (yellow card) 83'	Stadium: Emirates Stadium; Attendance: 59,925; Referee: Neil Swarbrick

1 January 2017 19	Arsenal	2–0	Crystal Palace	Holloway, London
16:00 GMT	Giroud 17'; Iwobi 56'; Monreal (yellow card) 83'	Arsenal report BBC report	Tomkins (yellow card) 90'	Stadium: Emirates Stadium; Attendance: 59,975; Referee: Andre Marriner

3 January 2017 20	Bournemouth	3–3	Arsenal	Bournemouth
19:45 GMT	Daniels 16'; C. Wilson 20' (pen.); S. Cook (yellow card) 44'; Fraser 58'; Francis (red card) 82'; Boruc (yellow card) 86'	Arsenal report BBC report	Bellerín (yellow card) 32'; Ramsey (yellow card) 45+3'; Sánchez 70'; Pérez 75'; Mustafi (yellow card) 80'; Giroud 90+2'	Stadium: Vitality Stadium; Attendance: 11,202; Referee: Michael Oliver

14 January 2017 21	Swansea City	0–4	Arsenal	Swansea
15:00 GMT	Ki (yellow card) 43'; Fer (yellow card) 78'	Arsenal report BBC report	Giroud 37'; Cork 54' (o.g.); Naughton 67' (o.g.); Sánchez 73'	Stadium: Liberty Stadium; Attendance: 20,875; Referee: Mike Jones

22 January 2017 22	Arsenal	2–1	Burnley	Holloway, London
14:15 GMT	Mustafi 59', (yellow card) 90+5'; Xhaka (red card) 65'; Sánchez 90+8' (pen.)	Arsenal report BBC report	Lowton (yellow card) 58'; Marney (yellow card) 74'; Gray 90+3' (pen.); Barnes (yellow card) 90+7'	Stadium: Emirates Stadium; Attendance: 59,955; Referee: Jonathan Moss

31 January 2017 23	Arsenal	1–2	Watford	Holloway, London
19:45 GMT	Gabriel (yellow card) 21'; Monreal (yellow card) 25'; Iwobi 58'; Sánchez (yellow card) 86'	Report	Kaboul 10'; Deeney 13'; Prödl (yellow card) 66'; Okaka (yellow card) 88'; Cleverley (yellow card) 90+2'	Stadium: Emirates Stadium; Attendance: 60,035; Referee: Andre Marriner

4 February 2017 24	Chelsea	3–1	Arsenal	Fulham, London
12:30 GMT	Alonso 13'; Hazard 53'; Matić (yellow card) 70'; Fàbregas 85'	Report	Mustafi (yellow card) 23'; Giroud 90+1'	Stadium: Stamford Bridge; Attendance: 41,490; Referee: Martin Atkinson

11 February 2017 25	Arsenal	2–0	Hull City	Holloway, London
12:30 GMT	Sánchez 34', 90+3' (pen.), (yellow card) 76'; Walcott (yellow card) 53'; Gibbs (yellow card) 54'	Report	Ranocchia (yellow card) 70'; Clucas (red card) 90+1'	Stadium: Emirates Stadium; Attendance: 59,962; Referee: Mark Clattenburg

4 March 2017 26	Liverpool	3–1	Arsenal	Liverpool
17:30 GMT	Firmino 9'; Mané 40'; Can (yellow card) 68'; Wijnaldum 90+1'	Report	Coquelin (yellow card) 34'; Welbeck 57'; Xhaka (yellow card) 78'	Stadium: Anfield; Attendance: 53,146; Referee: Bobby Madley

18 March 2017 27	West Bromwich Albion	3–1	Arsenal	West Bromwich
12:30 GMT	Dawson 12', 75'; Kanu 55'; McClean (yellow card) 42'	Report	Sánchez 15'	Stadium: The Hawthorns; Attendance: 24,065; Referee: Neil Swarbrick

2 April 2017 28	Arsenal	2–2	Manchester City	Holloway, London
16:00 BST	Coquelin (yellow card) 15'; Xhaka (yellow card) 32'; Walcott 40'; Mustafi 53', (yellow card) 61'	Report	Sané 5'; Navas (yellow card) 8'; Agüero 42'; Fernandinho (yellow card) 47'	Stadium: Emirates Stadium; Attendance: 60,001; Referee: Andre Marriner

5 April 2017 29	Arsenal	3–0	West Ham United	Holloway, London
19:45 BST	Bellerín (yellow card) 18'; Özil 58'; Mustafi (yellow card) 62'; Walcott 68'; Giroud 83'	Report	Lanzini (yellow card) 39'; Byram (yellow card) 77'	Stadium: Emirates Stadium; Attendance: 59,961; Referee: Martin Atkinson

10 April 2017 30	Crystal Palace	3–0	Arsenal	Selhurst, London
20:00 BST	Townsend 17'; Cabaye 63'; Milivojević 68' (pen.)	Report	Mustafi (yellow card) 23'	Stadium: Selhurst Park; Attendance: 25,648; Referee: Michael Oliver

17 April 2017 31	Middlesbrough	1–2	Arsenal	Middlesbrough
20:00 BST	Leadbitter (yellow card) 7'; Negredo 50'; Gestede (yellow card) 82'	Report	Oxlade-Chamberlain (yellow card) 4'; Sánchez 42'; Gabriel (yellow card) 43'; Özil 71'	Stadium: Riverside Stadium; Attendance: 31,298; Referee: Anthony Taylor

26 April 2017 32	Arsenal	1–0	Leicester City	Holloway, London
19:45 BST	Xhaka (yellow card) 82'; Huth 86' (o.g.); Sánchez (yellow card) 90+3'	Report	Simpson (yellow card) 38'; Fuchs (yellow card) 52'; Benalouane (yellow card) 80'; Huth (yellow card) 90+4'	Stadium: Emirates Stadium; Attendance: 59,829; Referee: Mike Jones

30 April 2017 33	Tottenham Hotspur	2–0	Arsenal	Tottenham, London
16:30 BST	Alli 55'; Kane 58' (pen.), (yellow card) 72'	Report	Gabriel (yellow card) 70'; Giroud (yellow card) 73'; Monreal (yellow card) 76'	Stadium: White Hart Lane; Attendance: 31,811; Referee: Michael Oliver

7 May 2017 34	Arsenal	2–0	Manchester United	Holloway, London
16:00 BST	Xhaka 54'; Welbeck 57'; Koscielny (yellow card) 67'	Report		Stadium: Emirates Stadium; Attendance: 60,055; Referee: Andre Marriner

10 May 2017 35	Southampton	0–2	Arsenal	Southampton
19:45 BST	Ward-Prowse (yellow card) 44'	Report	Sánchez 60'; Özil (yellow card) 73'; Giroud 83'; Bellerín (yellow card) 90+2'	Stadium: St Mary's Stadium; Attendance: 31,474; Referee: Jonathan Moss

13 May 2017 36	Stoke City	1–4	Arsenal	Stoke-on-Trent
17:30 BST	Crouch 67', (yellow card) 89'	Report	Mustafi (yellow card) 28'; Giroud 42', 80'; Özil 55'; Sánchez 76'; Holding (yellow card) 78'	Stadium: bet365 Stadium; Attendance: 27,535; Referee: Mike Dean

16 May 2017 37	Arsenal	2–0	Sunderland	Holloway, London
19:45 BST	Bellerín (yellow card) 22'; Monreal (yellow card) 54'; Özil (yellow card) 55'; Sánchez 72', 81'; Mustafi (yellow card) 90+2'	Report	O'Shea (yellow card) 56'; Cattermole (yellow card) 74'	Stadium: Emirates Stadium; Attendance: 59,500; Referee: Roger East

21 May 2017 38	Arsenal	3–1	Everton	Holloway, London
15:00 BST	Bellerín 8'; Koscielny (red card) 14'; Sánchez 27'; Gabriel (yellow card) 51'; Holding (yellow card) 62'; Ramsey 90+1'	Report	Williams (yellow card) 19'; Jagielka (yellow card) 39'; Lukaku 58' (pen.); Schneiderlin (yellow card) 61'; Baines (yellow card) 73'	Stadium: Emirates Stadium; Attendance: 59,976; Referee: Michael Oliver

=== FA Cup ===
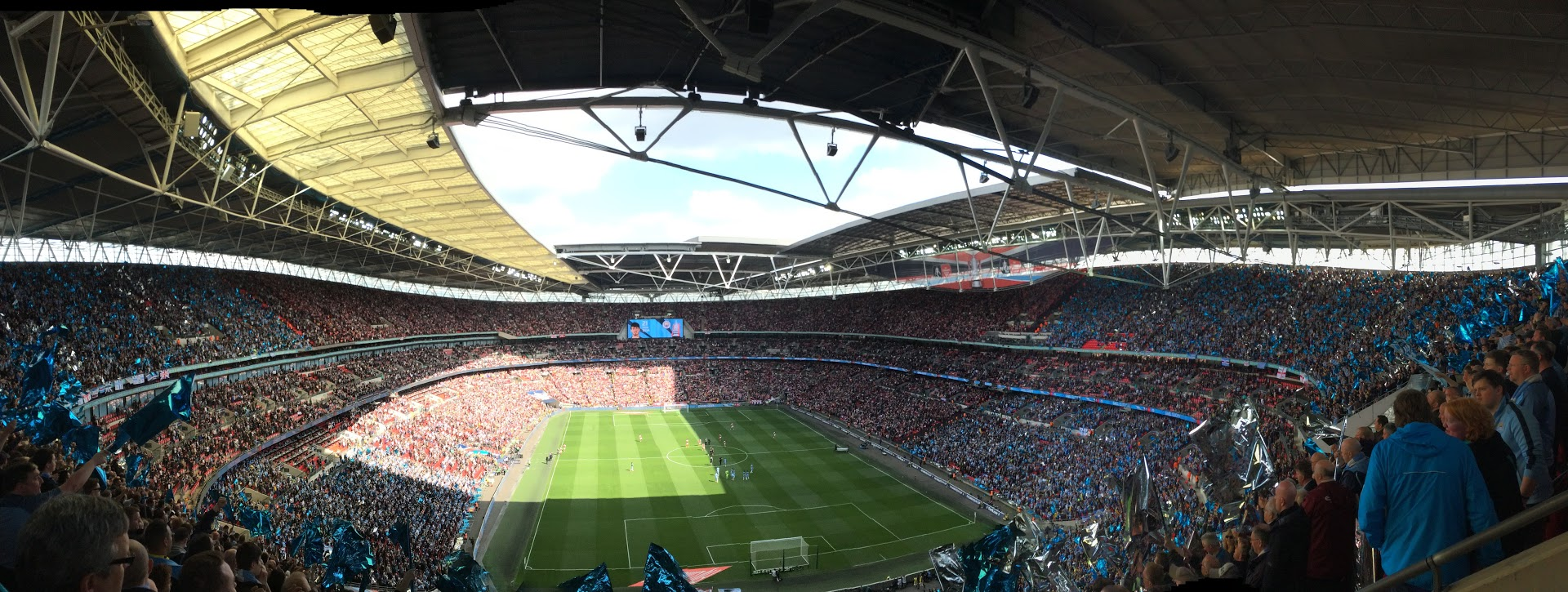
The FA Cup semi-final against Manchester City at the national stadium.

Win Draw Loss

7 January 2017 Third round	Preston North End	1–2	Arsenal	Preston
17:30 GMT	Robinson 7'; Hugill (yellow card) 44'; Cunningham (yellow card) 65'; Pearson (yellow card) 75'	Report	Ramsey 46'; Gabriel (yellow card) 70'; Giroud 89'	Stadium: Deepdale; Attendance: 22,185; Referee: Robert Madley

28 January 2017 Fourth round	Southampton	0–5	Arsenal	Southampton
17:30 GMT		Arsenal report BBC report	Welbeck 15', 22'; Walcott 35', 69', 84'	Stadium: St Mary's Stadium; Attendance: 31,288; Referee: Kevin Friend

20 February 2017 Fifth round	Sutton United	0–2	Arsenal	Sutton, London
19:55 GMT		BBC report	Xhaka (yellow card) 24'; Pérez 27'; Reine-Adélaïde (yellow card) 40'; Walcott 55'	Stadium: Gander Green Lane; Attendance: 5,013; Referee: Michael Oliver

11 March 2017 Quarter-final	Arsenal	5–0	Lincoln City	Holloway, London
17:30 GMT	Xhaka (yellow card) 24'; Koscielny (yellow card) 37'; Walcott 45+1'; Giroud 53'; Waterfall 58' (o.g.); Sánchez 72'; Ramsey 75'	BBC Report	Woodyard (yellow card) 47'; Margetts (yellow card) 63'; Raggett (yellow card) 85'	Stadium: Emirates Stadium; Attendance: 59,454; Referee: Anthony Taylor

23 April 2017 Semi-final	Arsenal	2–1 (a.e.t.)	Manchester City	Wembley, London
15:00 BST	Sánchez (yellow card) 25', (goal) 101'; Monreal 72'; Xhaka (yellow card) 111'	BBC Report	Agüero 62'; Fernandinho (yellow card) 69'; De Bruyne (yellow card) 89'; Sané (yellow card) 102'; Delph (yellow card) 105'; Otamendi (yellow card) 115'	Stadium: Wembley Stadium; Attendance: 85,725; Referee: Craig Pawson

27 May 2017 Final	Arsenal	2–1	Chelsea	Wembley, London
17:30 BST	Sánchez 4'; Ramsey (yellow card) 9', (goal) 79'; Holding (yellow card) 54'; Xhaka (yellow card) 81'; Coquelin (yellow card) 83'	BBC Report	Moses (yellow card) 57' (yellow-red card) 68'; Kanté (yellow card) 59'; Costa 76'	Stadium: Wembley Stadium; Attendance: 89,472; Referee: Anthony Taylor

=== EFL Cup ===
Win Draw Loss

20 September 2016 Third round	Nottingham Forest	0–4	Arsenal	West Bridgford, Nottinghamshire
19:45 BST	Bendtner (yellow card) 16'; Lansbury (yellow card) 67'; Cohen (yellow card) 75'	Arsenal report BBC report	Xhaka 23'; Holding (yellow card) 37'; Pérez 60' (pen.), 71'; Oxlade-Chamberlain 90+3'	Stadium: City Ground; Attendance: 28,567; Referee: Paul Tierney

25 October 2016 Fourth round	Arsenal	2–0	Reading	Holloway, London
19:45 BST	Oxlade-Chamberlain 33', 78'	Arsenal report BBC report	McCleary (yellow card) 76'; Moore (yellow card) 79'	Stadium: Emirates Stadium; Attendance: 59,865; Referee: Graham Scott

30 November 2016 Fifth round	Arsenal	0–2	Southampton	Holloway, London
19:45 GMT	Elneny (yellow card) 29'; Iwobi (yellow card) 33'; Pérez (yellow card) 80'	Report	Clasie 13'; Yoshida (yellow card) 34'; Bertrand 38'	Stadium: Emirates Stadium; Attendance: 59,013; Referee: Kevin Friend

=== UEFA Champions League ===
Arsenal qualified for the group stage of the 2016–17 UEFA Champions League due to finishing second in the 2015–16 Premier League. This meant that Arsenal qualified for the UEFA Champions League for the 19th consecutive season.

==== Group stage ====
The Gunners were drawn against French side Paris Saint-Germain, Swiss club Basel and Bulgarian team Ludogorets Razgrad.

Pos	Team	Pld	W	D	L	GF	GA	GD	Pts	Qualification	ARS	PAR	LUD	BSL
1	(England) Arsenal	6	4	2	0	18	6	+12	14	Advance to knockout phase	—	2–2	6–0	2–0
2	(France) Paris Saint-Germain	6	3	3	0	13	7	+6	12	Advance to knockout phase	1–1	—	2–2	3–0
3	(Bulgaria) Ludogorets Razgrad	6	0	3	3	6	15	−9	3	Transfer to Europa League	2–3	1–3	—	0–0
4	(Switzerland) Basel	6	0	2	4	3	12	−9	2		1–4	1–2	1–1	—

Source: UEFA
Rules for classification: Group stage tiebreakers

Win Draw Loss

13 September 2016 1	Paris Saint-Germain (France)	1–1	(England) Arsenal	Paris, France
19:45 BST	Cavani 1'; Verratti (yellow card) 8' (yellow-red card) 90+3'; Motta (yellow card) 90+2'	Arsenal report UEFA report	Coquelin (yellow card) 24'; Sánchez 78'; Giroud (yellow card) 88' (yellow-red card) 90+3'	Stadium: Parc des Princes; Attendance: 46,440; Referee: Viktor Kassai (Hungary)

28 September 2016 2	Arsenal (England)	2–0	(Switzerland) Basel	London, England
19:45 BST	Walcott 7', 26'	Arsenal report UEFA report	Suchý (yellow card) 21'; Elyounoussi (yellow card) 85'	Stadium: Emirates Stadium; Attendance: 59,993; Referee: Danny Makkelie (Netherlands)

19 October 2016 3	Arsenal (England)	6–0	(Bulgaria) Ludogorets Razgrad	London, England
19:45 BST	Sánchez 12'; Walcott 42'; Oxlade-Chamberlain 46'; Özil 56', 83', 87'	Arsenal report UEFA report		Stadium: Emirates Stadium; Attendance: 59,944; Referee: Artur Soares Dias (Portugal)

1 November 2016 4	Ludogorets Razgrad (Bulgaria)	2–3	(England) Arsenal	Sofia, Bulgaria
19:45 GMT	Cafu 12'; Keșerü 15'; Minev (yellow card) 38'	Arsenal report UEFA report	Xhaka 20', (yellow card) 66'; Giroud 41'; Coquelin (yellow card) 59'; Jenkinson (yellow card) 70'; Özil 87'	Stadium: Vasil Levski National Stadium; Attendance: 30,862; Referee: Bas Nijhuis (Netherlands)

23 November 2016 5	Arsenal (England)	2–2	(France) Paris Saint-Germain	London, England
19:45 GMT	Coquelin (yellow card) 34'; Giroud 45+1' (pen.); Koscielny (yellow card) 53'; Verratti 60' (o.g.)	Arsenal report UEFA report	Cavani 18'; Marquinhos (yellow card) 31'; Verratti (yellow card) 55'; Iwobi 77' (o.g.)	Stadium: Emirates Stadium; Attendance: 59,628; Referee: Felix Brych (Germany)

6 December 2016 6	Basel (Switzerland)	1–4	(England) Arsenal	Basel, Switzerland
19:45 GMT	Álvarez (yellow card) 66'; Doumbia 78'	Arsenal report UEFA report	Pérez 8', 16', 47'; Gibbs (yellow card) 36'; Iwobi 53'	Stadium: St. Jakob-Park; Attendance: 36,000; Referee: Jorge Sousa (Portugal)

==== Knockout phase ====
===== Round of 16 =====
The draw was held on 12 December 2016, with Arsenal amongst the seeded teams (as group winners) drawn against one of the unseeded runners-up, Bayern Munich. The first leg was played away on 15 February, and the second leg was played at home on 7 March 2017.

Win Draw Loss

15 February 2017 First leg	Bayern Munich (Germany)	5–1	(England) Arsenal	Munich, Germany
19:45 GMT	Robben 11'; Hummels (yellow card) 26'; Lewandowski 53'; Thiago 56', 63'; Lahm (yellow card) 83'; Müller 88'	Arsenal report UEFA report	Mustafi (yellow card) 15'; Sánchez 30', (yellow card) 33'; Xhaka (yellow card) 60'	Stadium: Allianz Arena; Attendance: 70,000; Referee: Milorad Mažić (Serbia)

7 March 2017 Second leg	Arsenal (England)	1–5 (2–10 agg.)	(Germany) Bayern Munich	London, England
19:45 GMT	Walcott 20', (yellow card) 39'; Koscielny (red card) 53'; Oxlade-Chamberlain (yellow card) 61'; Xhaka (yellow card) 79'	Report	Alaba (yellow card) 39'; Martínez (yellow card) 44'; Lewandowski 55' (pen.); Robben 68'; Douglas Costa 78'; Vidal 80', 85'	Stadium: Emirates Stadium; Referee: Anastasios Sidiropoulos (Greece)

== Awards ==
=== Arsenal Player of the Month award ===
Awarded monthly to the player that was chosen by fan voting on Arsenal.com

Month	Player	Votes
August	(France) Laurent Koscielny	35.6%
September	(Chile) Alexis Sánchez	39.4%
October	(Germany) Mesut Özil	45%
November	(Chile) Alexis Sánchez (2)	54.7%
December	(Chile) Alexis Sánchez (3)	80.4%
January	(France) Olivier Giroud	60.4%
February	(Chile) Alexis Sánchez (4)	38%
March	(Chile) Alexis Sánchez (5)	63.3%
April	(England) Alex Oxlade-Chamberlain	56.7%
