= Henry Keswick (businessman) =

British businessman (1938–2024)

Sir Henry Keswick
- Born: Henry Neville Lindley Keswick; 29 September 1938; Shanghai International Settlement
- Died: 5 November 2024 (aged 86)
- Education: Eton College
- Alma mater: Trinity College, Cambridge
- Occupation: Chairman emeritus of Jardine Matheson Holdings
- Title: The Spectator (owner, 1975–1980); Jardine Matheson Holdings (former Chairman, 1961)
- Spouse: Tessa Keswick (m. 1985; died 2022)
- Father: Sir William Johnstone "Tony" Keswick
- Relatives: Sir John Chippendale Keswick (brother); Simon Keswick (brother)

Sir Henry Neville Lindley Keswick (29 September 1938 – 5 November 2024) was a British businessman who was chairman of Jardine Matheson.

== Early life ==
Keswick was born in 1938 in Shanghai, China, into the Keswick family of businesspeople. He was the son of Sir William Johnstone "Tony" Keswick and Mary Lindley, and an older brother to Simon Keswick and Sir Chips Keswick. He was educated at Eton College and Trinity College, Cambridge.

During the coronation of Elizabeth II in 1953, Keswick was a page to Field Marshal Alan Brooke, and took part in the ceremony in Westminster Abbey. During his period of national service from 1956 to 1958, he was commissioned into the Scots Guards.

== Business career ==
Keswick owned The Spectator, a British conservative magazine, from 1975 to 1980. He was the chairman of Jardine Matheson Holdings Ltd, which he joined in 1961. He was a director from 1967 and became managing director in 1970, and chairman in 1972.

== Other interests ==
Keswick was vice chairman of the Hong Kong Association and a member of the council of the National Trust. He was previously the chairman of the National Portrait Gallery.

== Personal life and death ==
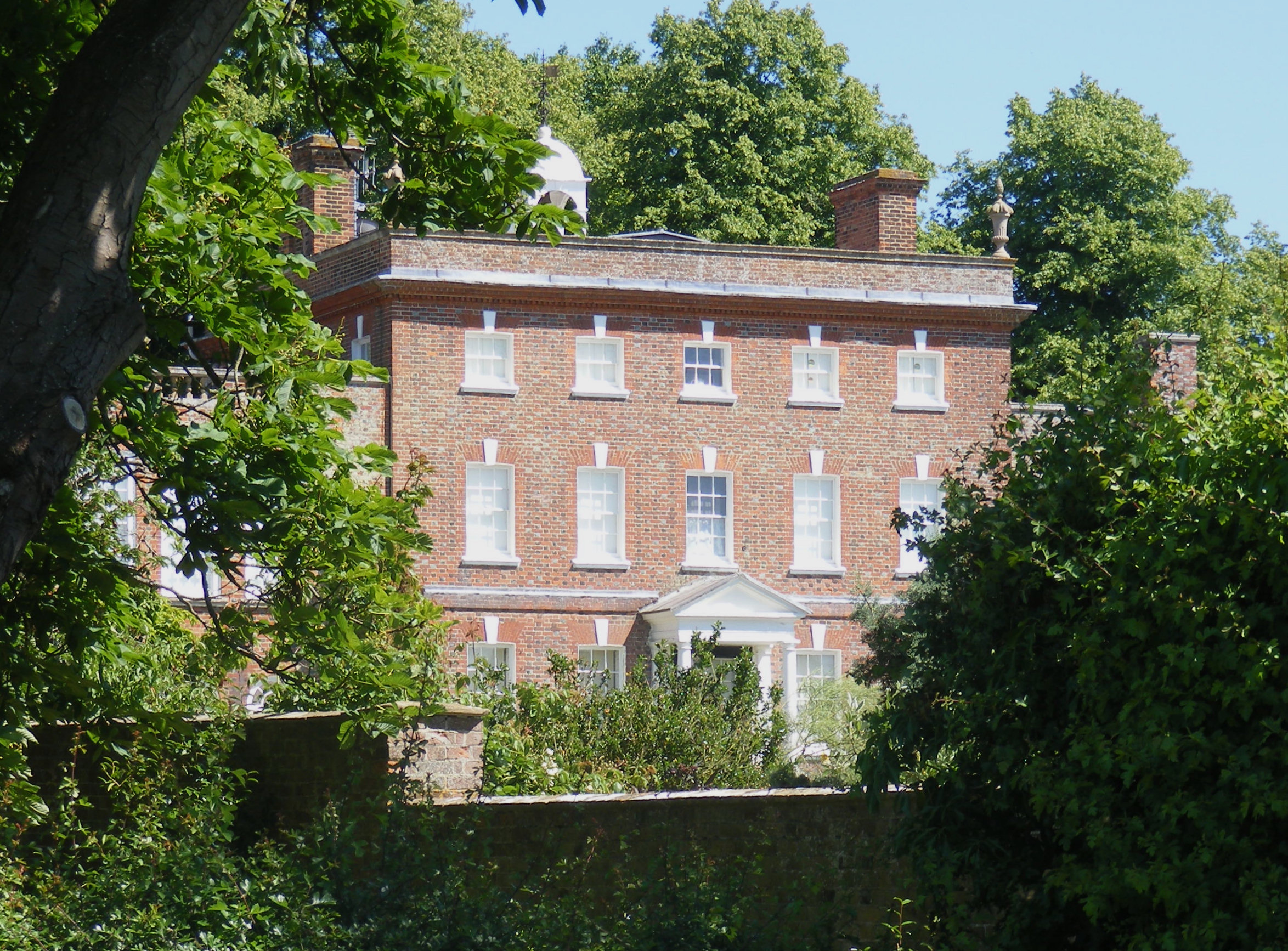
Oare House, 2010

Keswick was a practising Roman Catholic and was a member of the Tablet Trust, a charity linked to The Tablet newspaper.

In 1985, he married Tessa (née Fraser), a public policy analyst who went on to be chancellor of the University of Buckingham. She was the younger daughter of Simon Fraser, 15th Lord Lovat and was formerly married to Hugh Mackay, 14th Lord Reay. They lived at Oare House, a large country estate in Oare, Wiltshire.

Keswick and his wife donated £100,000 to the Conservative Party in the 2017 General Election. According to the Register of Members' Financial Interests, in January 2020, Keswick donated £2,000 to Conservative MP Jacob Rees-Mogg. He also donated £10,000 to MP Danny Kruger.

Keswick died at home on 5 November 2024, at the age of 86.

== Honours ==
Keswick was knighted in the 2009 Birthday Honours for services to British business interests overseas and charitable activities in the UK.

Business positions
Preceded by Sir John Keswick	Chairman of the Jardine, Matheson & Co. 1972–1975	Succeeded by DK Newbigging
