= Duncan Bluck =

British businessman

Duncan Bluck CBE

Chairman of Swire in Hong Kong
- In office 1 January 1981 – April 1984
- Preceded by: John Bremridge
- Succeeded by: Henry Miles

Managing Director of Cathay Pacific
- In office January 1971 – 1979
- Preceded by: John Bremridge
- Succeeded by: Henry Miles

Personal details
- Born: 19 March 1927 Shanghai, Republic of China
- Died: 6 October 2015 (aged 88) Kent, England
- Spouse: Stella Murdoch (m. 1952–2015)
- Children: Penny, Beth, Ali and Michael
- Education: Taunton School
- Occupation: Businessman

Duncan Robert Yorke Bluck, CBE (19 March 1927 – 6 October 2015) was a British businessman. He was the managing director of Cathay Pacific from 1971 to 1979.

Business positions
Preceded by John Bremridge	Managing Director of the Cathay Pacific; 1971–1979	Succeeded by Henry Miles
Preceded by John Bremridge	Chairman of Swire; 1981–1984	Succeeded by Henry Miles
Political offices
Preceded by David Newbigging	Chairman of the Hong Kong Tourist Association; 1982–1984	Succeeded by Henry Miles
