= Simon Keswick =

Scottish businessman (born 1942)

- Born: Simon Lindley Keswick; 20 May 1942 (age 84)
- Education: Eton College
- Alma mater: Trinity College, Cambridge
- Occupations: Director of Matheson & Co., Fleming Mercantile Investment Trust, Hanson plc, Jardine Lloyd Thompson Group and the Mandarin Oriental Hotel Group
- Spouse: Emma Chetwode
- Children: 4
- Father: Sir Tony Keswick
- Relatives: Sir Henry Keswick (brother); Sir Chips Keswick (brother)

Simon Lindley Keswick FRSA (born 20 May 1942) is a Scottish businessman and the younger brother of Sir Chips Keswick and Sir Henry Keswick.

== Early life and education ==
Part of the Keswick family business dynasty, he is the son of Sir William Johnstone "Tony" Keswick and Mary Lindley, and the grandson of Henry Keswick. He was educated at Eton College and Trinity College, Cambridge.

== Career ==
He is a director of Matheson & Co.(owned by Jardine Matheson Holdings) and various other Jardine Matheson affiliated businesses including the Mandarin Oriental Hotel Group. He was previously Chairman of the Kwik Save Group plc.

A Cheltenham Town supporter, he was a director on the club's board until resigning in January 2009. However he remains the club largest shareholder despite playing a less public role.

== Political activity ==
Keswick donated £100,000 to the Conservative Party during the 2019 United Kingdom general election. He also donated £2,000 to the Foreign Secretary, Dominic Raab.

== Personal life ==
In 1971, he married Emma Chetwode, daughter of Major George David Chetwode and Lady Willa Elliot-Murray-Kynynmound. They have two sons and two daughters.

Business positions
Preceded by D. K. Newbigging	Chairman of the Jardine, Matheson & Co. 1986–1988	Succeeded by Brian Powers
