= Lady Sarah Keswick =

British courtier (born 1945)

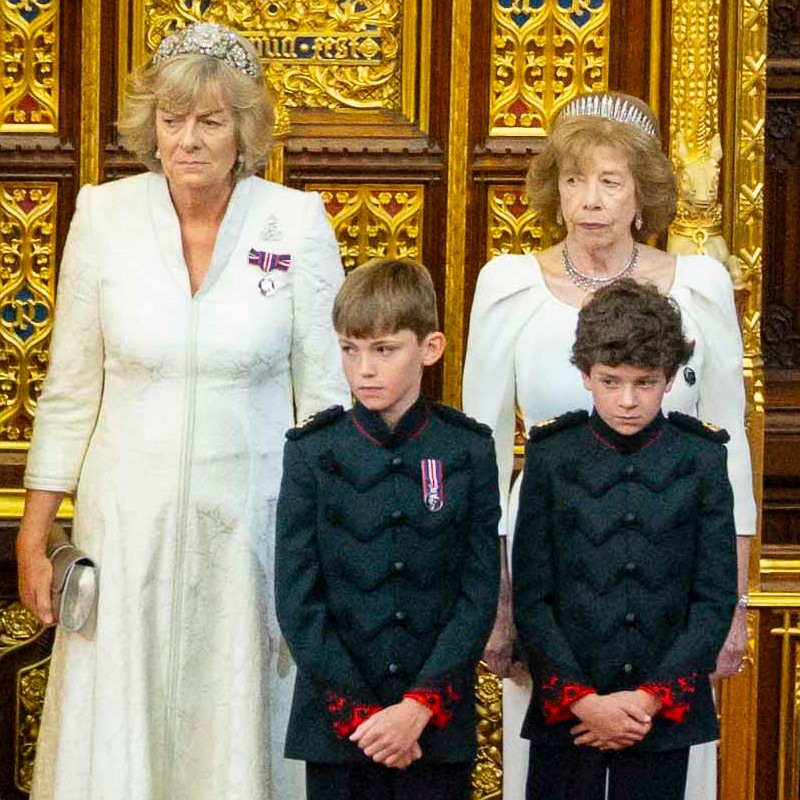
- Lady Sarah (right) at the 2024 State Opening of Parliament
- Born: Sarah Mary Ramsay; 18 October 1945 (age 80)
- Spouse: Sir Chips Keswick (m. 1966; died 2024)
- Children: 3
- Parent(s): Simon Ramsay, 16th Earl of Dalhousie; Margaret Stirling

Lady Sarah Mary Keswick (née Ramsay; born 18 October 1945) is a British aristocrat and courtier. She is a member of the British Royal Household as one of Queen Camilla's six Queen's companions.

== Early life and family ==
She was born on 18 October 1945 to the Hon. Simon Ramsay, son of the 14th Earl of Dalhousie, and Margaret Stirling of Keir, daughter of Brigadier-General Archibald Stirling of Keir. In 1950, her father succeeded to the Earldom of Dalhousie.

== Relationship with the royal family ==
Lady Sarah is a close friend of Queen Camilla and has accompanied her to the Wimbledon Championships on various occasions. In 1995, Camilla and Charles III (then Prince of Wales) made their first public appearance together at Lady Sarah's 50th birthday part at The Ritz Hotel, London.

=== Member of the Royal Household ===
Lady Sarah was appointed by the queen to serve as one of six Queen's companions in the British Royal Household. She accompanied the queen during the coronation of King Charles III and Queen Camilla on 6 May 2023.

She and Fiona Petty-Fitzmaurice, Marchioness of Lansdowne attended to the queen during the 2023 and 2024 State Opening of Parliament. Her grandson, William Keswick, served as a page to the queen.

In January 2025, Lady Sarah accompanied the king and queen on their first Sunday morning church appearance that year, at Crathie Kirk near Balmoral Castle. Later that year she accompanied the king and queen in the first carriage of the royal procession at Royal Ascot, sitting next to Prince Faisal bin Salman Al Saud.

== Personal life ==
On 23 April 1966, Lady Sarah married the banker Sir John Chippendale "Chips" Lindley Keswick. Her husband, the son of Sir William Johnston Keswick, was a member of the Keswick banking dynasty. She and Sir Chips have three sons: David, Tobias and Adam. Her husband died in 2024.
