= Redfern (surname) =

Redfern is a surname with links to the English county of Lancashire.

Variations of the surname include: Redferne, Redfearn, Reedfern, Readfern, Reddfern, Redfinn, Redfyn, Le Redefern and De Redeven

The Sydney suburb Redfern is named after William Redfern a doctor who was eventually granted land rights in the area after being pardoned for his participation in The 1797 Spithead and Nore mutinies

- Alastair Redfern (born 1948), English bishop
- Anthea Redfern (born 1948), British television host
- Arthur E. Redfern (1885–1917), American jockey
- Charles E. Redfern (1839–1929), Canadian politician
- Chris Redfern (born 1964), American politician from Ohio
- David Redfern (1936–2014), British music photographer
- Harry Redfern (1861–1950), British architect
- Henry Jasper Redfern (1871–1928), British optician, photographer, film maker and x-ray pioneer
- Jamie Redfern (born 1957), Australian pop singer
- Michael Redfern (1943–2022), English actor
- Nick Redfern (born 1964), British ufologist
- Paul Redfern (1902–unknown), American aviator
- Pete Redfern (born 1954), Major League Baseball pitcher
- Rebecca Redfern (born 1999), British para-swimmer
- Sir Shuldham Redfern (1895–1985), British civil servant in the Sudan and Canada
- William Redfern (1774–1833), Australian surgeon

== Pen name ==
- Cameron S. Redfern (born 1968), pen name of Australian author Sonya Hartnett

== In fiction ==
- Christine and Patrick Redfern, fictional characters from Evil Under the Sun
- Jeff and Rick Redfern, fictional characters from Doonesbury
- Joan Redfern, a school matron in the Doctor Who episodes "Human Nature" and "The Family of Blood"
- Dr. James Redfern and his son Bernard Snaith Redfern (alias Barney Snaith) in L. M. Montgomery's The Blue Castle.
