= Chips Keswick =

British merchant banker (1940–2024)

Sir Chips Keswick
- Born: John Chippendale Lindley Keswick; 2 February 1940; London, England
- Died: 17 April 2024 (aged 84)
- Education: Eton College
- Alma mater: University of Aix-Marseille
- Occupation: Merchant banker
- Known for: Former chairman of Hambros Bank, director of the Bank of England, former chairman of Arsenal FC
- Spouse: Lady Sarah Ramsay (m. 1966)
- Children: 3
- Father: Sir William Johnstone "Tony" Keswick
- Relatives: Sir Henry Keswick (brother); Simon Keswick (brother)

Sir John Chippendale "Chips" Lindley Keswick (2 February 1940 – 17 April 2024) was a British merchant banker and member of the Keswick family who control Jardine Matheson, founded by William Jardine. He was chairman of Arsenal Football Club from June 2013 until his retirement in May 2020.

== Early life and education ==
Part of the Keswick family business dynasty, John Keswick was born on 2 February 1940, as the son of Sir William Johnstone "Tony" Keswick (1903–1990) and Mary Lindley, and the grandson of Henry Keswick. He was educated at Eton College and the University of Aix-Marseilles.

== Business career ==
Keswick was chairman of Hambros Bank from 1986 to 1998. He was knighted for services to banking in the 1993 New Year Honours.

He was a director of Arsenal Football Club from November 2005, and the chairman from August 2013, when he succeeded Peter Hill-Wood, until his retirement in May 2020.

== Personal life ==
Keswick married Lady Sarah Ramsay, daughter of the 16th Earl of Dalhousie, in 1966. They have three sons: David, Tobias and Adam. The family are friends of King Charles III and Queen Camilla. Lady Sarah is one of the official "Queen's companions".

In December 2013, the unionist group Better Together released the names of individuals who have made major donations to their funds, and Keswick was revealed to have donated £23,000 to the campaign.

Keswick was a keen racehorse owner and hunter.

Keswick's elder brother Henry and younger brother Simon Keswick are chairman and director of Jardine Matheson Holdings.

Keswick died on 17 April 2024, at the age of 84. His memorial service, held in May 2024 in Knightsbridge, was attended by the King and Queen.
