= Redfearn =

Surname

Redfearn is a surname. Notable people with the surname include:

- Alan Redfearn, English rugby league footballer who played in the 1970s and 1980s
- Alec K. Redfearn, musician and composer based out of Providence, Rhode Island
- Brian Redfearn, former professional footballer
- David Redfearn, English rugby league footballer who played in the 1970s and 1980s
- Joseph Redfearn, first class cricketer who played one match for Yorkshire County Cricket Club in 1890 against Surrey CCC
- J. W. T. Redfearn, English physician, psychiatrist, analytical psychologist and writer
- Neil Redfearn (born 1965), English footballer and manager
- Paul Leslie Redfearn (1926–2018), American professor of botany and mayor of Springfield, Missouri

== See also ==
- Redfearn v United Kingdom, a UK labour law case concerning a race discrimination case under the Race Relations Act 1976
- Transverse Mercator: Redfearn series, the basis of the Ordnance Survey National Grid
- Redfern (disambiguation)
