= David Landale =

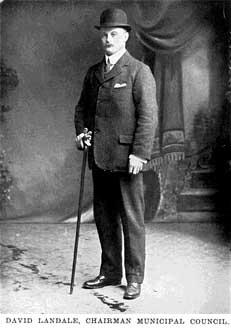

Unofficial Member of the Executive Council of Hong Kong
- In office 25 July 1916 – 1916
- Appointed by: Sir Francis Henry May
- Preceded by: Sir Paul Chater
- Succeeded by: Sir Paul Chater
- In office 22 August 1918 – 1918
- Appointed by: Sir Francis Henry May
- Preceded by: Sir Paul Chater
- Succeeded by: Sir Paul Chater

Unofficial Member of the Legislative Council of Hong Kong
- In office 29 May 1913 – 10 April 1919
- Appointed by: Sir Francis Henry May
- Preceded by: C. H. Ross
- Succeeded by: C. E. Anton

Chairman of the Shanghai Municipal Council
- In office May 1907 – 17 January 1911
- Preceded by: Henry Keswick
- Succeeded by: Harry De Gray

Chairman of the Hongkong & Shanghai Banking Corporation
- In office February 1914 – February 1916
- Preceded by: F. H. Armstrong
- Succeeded by: W. L. Pattenden

Personal details
- Born: 6 August 1868
- Died: 6 September 1935 (aged 67) London, United Kingdom
- Spouse: Mildred Sophia Fortune (m. 1902)
- Children: 4, including David
- Education: Fettes College
- Occupation: Businessman

David Landale (6 August 1868 – 6 September 1935) was the 13th taipan of the Jardine Matheson & Co. and member of the Executive Council and Legislative Council of Hong Kong.

== Early life ==
Born on 6 August 1868, Landale was the son of Rev. David Landale and Margaret Helen Hassels Jardine, daughter of Sir William Jardine, 7th Baronet, a distant relative of the founder of the prominent trading house Jardine Matheson & Co., William Jardine. He was educated at Fettes College, Edinburgh.

== Career in China ==
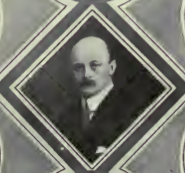
David Landale, Taipan of Jardines

Landale moved to the Far East and became both managing director of Jardine Matheson and the chairman of the Shanghai Municipal Council in 1907. He was also director of the Hongkong and Shanghai Banking Corporation until his resignation in 1920.

He was appointed as unofficial member of the Legislative Council of Hong Kong in 1913 and Executive Council in 1916. He was also the chairman of the Hong Kong General Chamber of Commerce in 1915.

== Marriage ==
In 1902 he married Mildred Sophia, second daughter of John Fortune. They had two sons and two daughters. One of his sons, David Fortune "Taffy" Landale, also became the chairman and managing director of Jardines. He was maternal great-grandfather to Olympic champion Matthew Pinsent.

== Death ==
Landale died on 6 September 1935 in London, England.

== Landale St ==
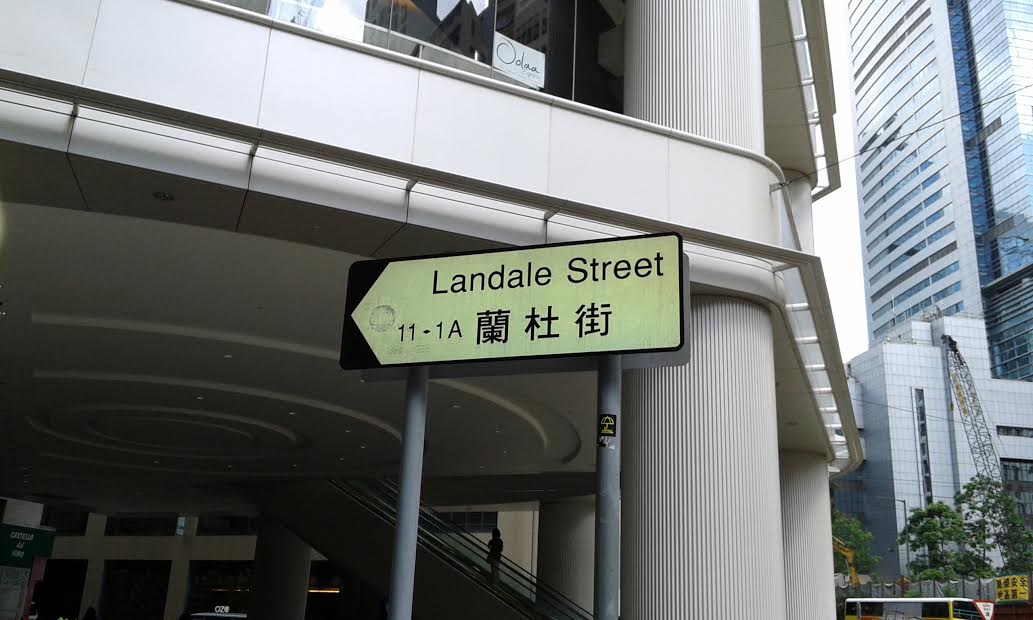
Landale St in Wanchai, Hong Kong

Landale Street in Wan Chai on Hong Kong Island was named after David Landale.

Political offices
Preceded by Henry Keswick	Chairman of the Shanghai Municipal Council; 1907–1911	Succeeded by Harry De Gray
Preceded by Catchick Paul Chater	Unofficial Member of the Executive Council of Hong Kong; 1916	Succeeded by Catchick Paul Chater
Preceded by Ernest Hamilton Sharp	Unofficial Member of the Executive Council of Hong Kong; 1918	Succeeded by Ernest Hamilton Sharp
Legislative Council of Hong Kong
Preceded by Charles Henderson Ross	Unofficial Member; 1913–1919	Succeeded by John Johnstone
Business positions
Preceded by F. H. Armstrong	Chairman of the Hongkong and Shanghai Banking Corporation; 1914–1916	Succeeded by W. L. Pattenden
