= Sarah (1819 ship) =

History

United Kingdom
- Name: Sarah
- Owner: T. Weeding & Co.
- Builder: James Warwick, Rotherhithe
- Launched: 15 September 1819
- Fate: Condemned c.1843

General characteristics
- Tons burthen: 488, or 48839/94 (bm)
- Propulsion: Sail

Sarah was launched at Rotherhithe in 1819. She made three trips to China and went to Australia four times. In 1829 she transported convicts to New South Wales and in 1837 she delivered convicts to Van Diemen's Land. She was condemned c.1843.

== Career ==
The British East India Company (EIC), in 1814 lost its monopoly on trade between Britain and India in 1814. In 1817 William Jardine left the EIC's service and with Thomas Weeding and Framjee Cowasjee formed a partnership that lasted until 1841. (Note: Thomas Weeding had been a surgeon on Boddam and Glatton before remaining in London and investing in trade with the East. Framjee Cowasjee was a Bombay Parsi interested in expanding the sale of malwa opium to China.) They purchased Sarah in 1819. Sarah appeared in Lloyd's Register 1819 with Thacker, master, Weeding, owner, and trade London–India. Captain J. Thacker sailed from England for Bombay on 19 January 1819 under a license from the EIC.

She then plied between Bombay and China, particularly in the opium trade.

On 12 November 1826 Sarah, Tucker, master, was sailing to Bombay but was still in the Atlantic. Tucker placed the boatswain in irons for insolent and abusive language, and determined to flog him. The crew threatened a rescue, at which a number of passengers came on deck to support Tucker and his officers. Tucker drew a line on the deck with his sword and ordered the crew not to cross it. The crew became increasingly mutinous, crossed the line, and began to assault the passengers. The passengers fired pistols with the result that one seaman was killed and three wounded. Tucker then put into Rio de Janeiro on 28 November. There the British naval commander an admiral, placed a guard of marines from his ship aboard Sarah to travel with her to Bombay. She sailed on 6 December.

On 29 August 1829 Captain Henry C. Columbine sailed Sarah from London, bound for Port Jackson. She stopped at Tristan da Cunha and St Paul Island before she arrived at Port Jackson on 7 December. She had embarked 200 male convicts and she landed 199, one man having died on the voyage.

On 16 January 1832 as Sarah was sailing from Bombay to London, she encountered at 33°42′N 23°49′W a brigantine of about 150 tons (bm), with damaged rigging and partially dismasted. There seemed to be no one aboard. Captain Columbine took a boat over too her, together with Sarah's carpenter and five seamen. They boarded the vessel, which turned out to named Invincible and on a journey from Spain to America. Columbine sent his boat back to Sarah with some articles salvaged from Invincible, remaining aboard her together with the carpenter. She suddenly sank, taking Columbine and the carpenter with her. The only trace of both men that boats from Sarah found was Columbine's hat.

The EIC finally lost its monopoly on the tea trade from China to Britain and completely left trading and shipping on 22 April 1834. Sarah became the first "Free Trader", to sail from Canton to Britain. She had jumped the gun a little as she had sailed from China on 23 March 1834. She reached the Cape of Good Hope on 9 June and arrived in England on 29 July. Although it was the trade in tea that had been completely freed, she carried a cargo of raw silk, which sold for £400,000.

In 1836 Sarah, Captain J.T. Whiteside, left London on 22 December, and arrived at Hobart 97 days later on 29 March 1837. This established a record that stood until British Sovereign arrived on 16 December 1840 in 91 days. Sarah had embarked 254 male convicts and she landed 245, nine men having died on the voyage.

== Fate ==
In 1841 Sarah's master was Dawson, changing to Heidrich. The next year her trade changed from London–India to London–Port Phillip (Melbourne).

Sarah was last listed in 1843 with the annotation "Condemned" by her name. The Spectator reported that Sarah, Heidrich, master, from Port Philip to China, has been condemned at Hong Kong. She had encountered severe weather on her way that had started her planks, making her leaky.

== Lloyd's Register ==
Year	Master	Owner	Trade	Notes
1820	Thacker	Weeding	London–India	
1825	Bowen	Weeding & Co.	London–Bombay	
1830	Tucker; Columbine	Weeding	London−New South Wales	
1835	Whiteside	Weeding	London−Sydney	
1840	Dawson	Weeding	London	Damages repaired 1836 and small repairs 1840
