= Jardine Paper =

The Jardine Paper was a December 1839 proposal sent by Dr. William Jardine to Lord Palmerston to guide the British government in its plans to wage war with China which eventually was called the First Opium War.

The actual strategy of Britain in the First Opium War very much mirrored the details of the Jardine Paper.

No copy of the Jardine Paper was found during a search by French writer Alain le Pichon but a letter from William Jardine to James Matheson dated December 19, 1839, preserved in a 1937 typescript by British historian Gerald Yorke puts across a similar position:

"My advice is to send a naval force to blockade the coast of China from the Tartar Wall to Tienpack or from 40 to 20 degrees north; the force to consist of two ships of the line, two frigates and two flat-bottomed steamers for river service, with a sufficient number of transports to carry…six or seven thousand men. The force to proceed to the vicinity of Pekin, and apply directly to the Emperor for an apology for the insult…payment for the opium given up, an equitable commercial treaty, and liberty to trade with northern ports...say, Amoy, Foochow, Ningpo, Shanghai and also Kiaochow, if we can get it.
The two first demands would readily be granted, but the third and fourth may be refused, and then we must proceed to take possession of three or four islands, say Formosa, Quemoy, and Amoy (or at least two…and intercept the trade from Formosa). We should also take the great Chusan Island, which being near Peking would be source of great annoyance to the Emperor. Having these islands in our possession, the Chinese would most likely grant all our demands on condition of our giving them up. I observe you are for Formosa, but it is too large, unless the inhabitants are well disposed towards us, How this advice will be received we know not as we have not yet sent it to Lord Palmerston.."
