= Churchill Scholarship =

Anglo-American post-graduate scholarship program

- Awarded for: one year of study at Churchill College at the University of Cambridge
- Sponsored by: Winston Churchill Foundation of the United States
- Location: Cambridge, England
- Established: 1959
- Website: churchillscholarship.org

The Churchill Scholarship is awarded by the Winston Churchill Foundation of the United States to graduates of the more than one hundred colleges and universities invited to participate in the Churchill Scholarship Program, for the pursuit of research and study in the physical and natural sciences, mathematics, engineering, for one year at Churchill College at the University of Cambridge.

The scholarship is often considered one of the most prestigious and competitive international fellowships available to American graduate students, alongside the Marshall, Rhodes, Gates Cambridge and Fulbright scholarships. Each year, up to two students may be endorsed by each of the 138 U.S. institutions invited to participate in the program.

== History ==
In 1958, Churchill College at Cambridge was founded in honor of Sir Winston Churchill with a primary focus on science, engineering and mathematics. Anticipating the final establishment of the college, Churchill met with American friends Lewis W. Douglas, John Loeb Sr., and Carl Gilbert to ask them to create a scholarship for young Americans to study at the college. In 1959, the Winston Churchill Foundation of the United States was established as a nonprofit charitable organization. The Foundation initially made travel grants to Churchill Overseas Fellows, distinguished senior faculty from American colleges and universities who would spend a sabbatical year at the college. Eight of the Churchill Fellows won the Nobel Prize.

In 1963 the Foundation funded the first three Churchill Scholarships for one year of study. Subsequently, the Scholarships funded either one-year programs or three-year doctoral degrees. In order to increase the number of Churchill Scholars, the foundation decided in the early 1980s to support only one-year programs. To this day however, it is not uncommon for Churchill Scholars to obtain alternate funding to support continued doctoral study at the University of Cambridge following the completion of their Scholarship year.

Since 1963, around 602 Churchill Scholarships have been awarded. As of 2016 the Foundation has increased the number of scholarships awarded each year from fourteen to fifteen. The scholarship is worth between $50,000 and $60,000 depending on the exchange rate, covering all university and college fees (i.e., tuition, currently about $25,000) at the University of Cambridge, a living allowance, visa fees, up to $1,500 for travel between the United States and the United Kingdom, and the possibility of an additional $2,000 Special Research Grant.

== Eligibility and selection ==
With an acceptance rate of approximately 6.3%, the Churchill Scholarship is less selective than the Marshall, Rhodes, Gates Cambridge and Mitchell scholarships (acceptance rates 3.3%, 3.7%, 1.6%, and 4% respectively), however, significantly fewer institutions are allowed to nominate candidates for the Churchill Scholarship (presently 138 institutions as compared to at least 240 institutions for the Marshall, over 320 institutions for the Rhodes, and at least 415 institutions for the Mitchell). Furthermore, each institution may nominate only two candidates to the Churchill Scholarship, so the endorsed candidate pool is initially very selective. By comparison, the Marshall scholarship typically receives 915-980 endorsed applicants and the Rhodes scholarship typically receives 850-880 endorsed applicants, and the Mitchell scholarship typically receives 300 endorsed applicants. In contrast to the Gates Cambridge Scholarship, applying to the Churchill, Marshall, Rhodes, or Mitchell scholarships all require the endorsement of an approved U.S. undergraduate institution. As such, the actual acceptance rates for these scholarships are significantly lower than the official acceptance rate of endorsed applicants (e.g., approximately 1.2% for the Rhodes in 2016). Instead of looking for the canonical "well rounded" applicant, the Churchill Scholarship seeks those with "interesting jagged-edges" and is considered one of the most academically challenging scholarships; the average GPA of the applicant pool is 3.8, and the average GPA of the winners is 3.98 (in 2016 all winners had a GPA above 3.95). From 2014 to 2017, 69% of the winning Churchill Scholars had previously received a Goldwater Scholarship.

=== Eligibility ===
Applicants for the Churchill Scholarship must be:

- A U.S. citizen
- A senior enrolled at one of the institutions participating in the scholarship program or have graduated within the past year
- Hold a bachelor's degree or an equivalent, and may not have attained a doctorate

=== Selection criteria ===
Applicants are chosen on the basis of:

- Outstanding academic achievement, especially in the chosen major
- Proven capacity for original, creative research as demonstrated by awards and letters of reference
- Outstanding personal qualities outside of academic pursuits

Each participating institution may nominate only two candidates for the Churchill Scholarship, and each sets its own criteria for nomination.

== Recipients ==
A complete list of current and past Churchill Scholars is available here.

As of 2021–2022, 82 institutions have had successful nominations, and the number of Churchill Scholars from each school are:

School	Number of Scholars
Princeton University	43
Harvard University	39
California Institute of Technology	21
Cornell University	21
Yale University	21
Duke University	20
University of North Carolina at Chapel Hill	18
Harvey Mudd College	17
University of Illinois at Urbana-Champaign	17
Michigan State University	16
Stanford University	16
University of Michigan at Ann Arbor	15
Johns Hopkins University	14
Massachusetts Institute of Technology	14
Purdue University	14
University of Chicago	14
Brown University	12
University of Pennsylvania	12
Carnegie Mellon University	11
University of Rochester	11
Amherst College	10
Northwestern University	10
University of Minnesota	10
Vanderbilt University	10
Dartmouth College	9
Case Western Reserve University	8
Ohio State University	7
University of California, Berkeley	7
Swarthmore College	6
Carleton College	6
Indiana University	6
Pomona College	6
Rensselaer Polytechnic Institute	6
Rice University	6
University of Maryland, College Park	6
University of Utah	6
Oberlin College	5
University of Arizona	5
University of California, San Diego	5
University of Iowa	5
University of Virginia	5
Georgia Institute of Technology	4
North Carolina State University	4
Stony Brook University	4
United States Naval Academy	4
University of Pittsburgh	4
University of Washington	4
University of Wisconsin-Madison	4
Columbia University	3
Georgetown University	3
Haverford College	3
Reed College	3
Rutgers University	3
United States Military Academy	3
University of California, Santa Barbara	3
University of Colorado Boulder	3
University of Texas at Austin	3
Williams College	3
Boston College	2
Brandeis University	2
Colgate University	2
Emory University	2
Pennsylvania State University	2
University of California, Los Angeles	2
University of Georgia	2
University of Massachusetts Amherst	2
University of New Mexico	2
University of Notre Dame	2
Washington University in St. Louis	2
Arizona State University	1
Baylor University	1
Boston University	1
Bowdoin College	1
Bryn Mawr College	1
Colorado School of Mines	1
Luther College	1
Mount Holyoke College	1
Oklahoma State University	1
University of Florida	1
University of Kansas	1
University of Southern California	1
Wake Forest University	1

== See also ==
- Fulbright Scholarship
- Gates Cambridge Scholarship
- Truman Scholarship
- Marshall Scholarship
- Mitchell Scholarship
- Rhodes Scholarship
- Schwarzman Scholarship
- Yenching Scholarship
- Jardine Scholarship
- Goldwater Scholarship
