= Harry De Gray =

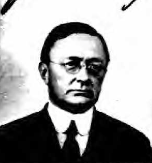

Chairman of the Shanghai Municipal Council
- In office 1911–1913
- Preceded by: David Landale
- Succeeded by: Edward Charles Pearce

Personal details
- Born: 31 October 1866 Paterson, New Jersey
- Died: 10 June 1952 (aged 85) New Jersey
- Profession: Businessman

Harry De Gray (1866–1952) was the chairman of the Shanghai Municipal Council for two years from 1911 to 1913.

== Biography ==
De Gray was born in Paterson, New Jersey, on 31 October 1866, the son of William M. De Gary.

De Gray moved to Shanghai in 1900. He was manager of the China and Japan Trading Company. He first served on the Shanghai Municipal Council in 1902. In 1911, he became chairman of the council, serving until 1913 when he returned to the United States. He continued to serve as the president of the China, Japan and South America Trading Company, and in that role continued to visit Asia from time to time.

De Gray married Elizabeth MacFarlan. She died on 4 January 1934 in New Jersey.

De Gray died in 1952, and was buried in Cedar Lawn Cemetery in Paterson, New Jersey, next to his wife in the family plot.
