= Alain le Pichon =

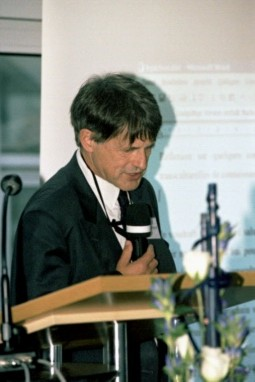
- Alain le Pichon
- Born: 29 November 1944 (age 81)
- Occupation: French anthropologist

Alain le Pichon (born 29 November 1944) is a French Anthropologist.

With Umberto Eco he founded Transcultura, an international institute, of which he became the president. In October 2010, Transcultura was given the role of organising th EU-China High Level Cultural Forum.

== Works ==
In French :

- Le Renversement du Ciel, collective work directed by Alain le Pichon and Moussa Sow, preface and texts by Umberto Eco, Paris CNRS Editions 2011 (650 p)
- Connaissance et Réciprocité, collective work directed by Alain le Pichon, preface by Umberto Eco, Presses Universitaires de Louvain, 1988 (285p.)
- Le Troupeau des Songes, avec Souleymane Baldé, Editions de la Maison des Sciences de l'Homme, 357 p. Paris 1990
- Le Regard inégal, essai, Editions JC Lattès, 230 p. Paris 1992
- La Licorne et le Dragon, les malentendus dans la recherche de l'universel, avec Yue Dayun, presses de l'université de Pékin 1995 - nouvelle édition en français revue Presses Universitaires de Pékin/Editions de la Fondation Charles Meyer 2004
- Les Assises de la connaissance réciproque, ed. Le Robert, 2003 (collective work directed by A. le Pichon)

en italien :

- Sguardi venuti da lontano, with a preface by Umberto Eco, Editions Bompiani, Milan, 1992

In English :

- Strategy for a mutual Knowledge Presses, Actes du Colloque Transcultura, University of Chicago Press 1992

In Chinese :

- Stratégies pour une connaissance réciproque, avec le Professeur Wang Bin, presses de l'université Sun Yat Sen de Canton
- La Licorne et le Dragon, (édition en chinois, avec le Professeur Yue Dayun, University of Peking Press1995

Co director with Yue Dayun of the journal Dialogue Transculturel
