= Jardine Scholarship =

Undergraduate award for study at the Universities of Oxford and Cambridge

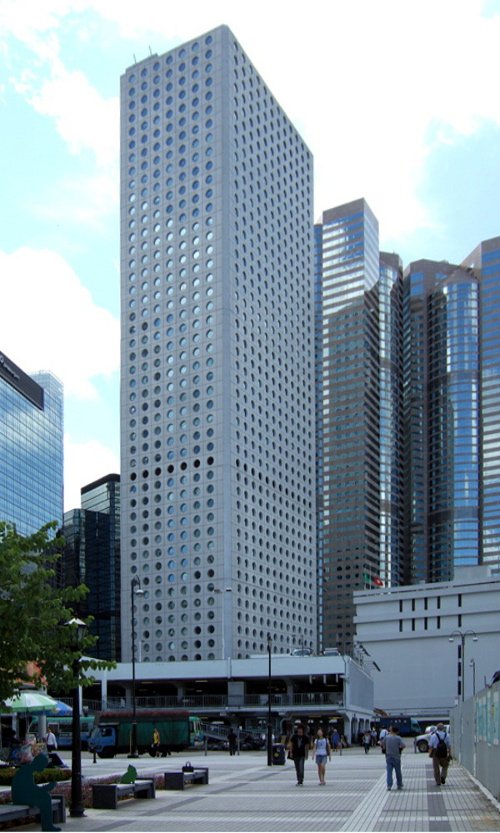
- Jardine House, Hong Kong
- Other names: Jardine Foundation Scholarship
- Type: Educational trust
- Established: 1982
- Parent institution: Jardine Matheson
- Academic affiliations: University of Oxford, University of Cambridge
- Location: Hong Kong, Mainland China, Singapore, Indonesia, Thailand, Vietnam, Cambodia, Malaysia, Myanmar, the Philippines, and Taiwan
- Website: www.jardine-foundation.org

The Jardine Scholarship is a full scholarship offered by Jardines for study at the Universities of Oxford and Cambridge. It was established in 1982 to commemorate the company's 150th anniversary and was founded with the objective of developing future leaders, who would give back to the societies in which Jardine Matheson operates. By 2018, 293 Jardine Scholarships had been awarded.

== Selection and selectivity ==
The scholarship is available for study in only four colleges in the University of Oxford and four in the University of Cambridge, with some exceptions. These are Exeter College, Oxford, Oriel College, Oxford, The Queen's College, Oxford, Trinity College, Oxford, Trinity College, Cambridge, Magdalene College, Cambridge, Peterhouse, Cambridge and Downing College, Cambridge.

It is also limited to the countries in which Jardine Matheson has a significant presence; these include Hong Kong, Mainland China, Singapore, Indonesia, Thailand, Vietnam, Cambodia, Malaysia, Myanmar, the Philippines, and Taiwan.

=== Application process ===
The application process involves both interviews and tests. There are typically two rounds of interviews and two timed essay exams, the latter on the applicant's career aspirations and on a separately assigned topic. The final interview is with the Scholarship Committee, typically a panel of eight or more experts. Former chairmen of the Scholarship Committee include Duncan Robinson, Sir Ivor Roberts and Geoffrey Grimmett.

=== Selection criteria ===
The Jardine Foundation specifies four standards against which applicants are to be judged:

- "personal qualities and character, with particular regard to the extent to which the applicant has demonstrated exceptional qualities of leadership and fellowship";
- "achievements in non-curricular activities, including sports";
- "community involvement and activities"; and
- "other attributes which, in the opinion of the Scholarship Committee, indicate that the applicant is likely to become an outstanding citizen with a high commitment to the performance of public duties and/or community involvement."

=== Terms of the Scholarship ===
The scholarship covers full tuition fees, college fees, an annual stipend, insurance, and return airfare from the students' country of origin. The scholarship has been valued at over $200,000. Upon acceptance, scholars are bound by a set of regulations, decided by the Scholarship Committee. Jardines maintains the network of scholars and offers them summer internships within the conglomerate, and hosts regular gatherings with alumni and senior management. Jardines' postgraduate scholarships are offered in partnership with the Cambridge Commonwealth, European & International Trust and Gadjah Mada University.

== See also ==
- Rhodes Scholarship at Oxford University
- Gates Cambridge Scholarship and Churchill Scholarship at Cambridge University
- Knight-Hennessy Scholars at Stanford University
- Yenching Scholarship at Peking University
- Schwarzman Scholars at Tsinghua University
