= EWO Brewery =

Chinese brewery

EWO beer label 1945–1946

The EWO Brewery Ltd. was established in Shanghai, China in 1935 by Jardine, Matheson & Co. Ltd, one of the largest trading companies in the Far East at that time. Beer production commenced in 1936, and Ewo Breweries became a public company under Jardines' management in 1940 with Chinese investors buying up 75% of the stock. The brewery, built in the Yangpu District then on the Eastern outskirts of Shanghai, was commandeered by the Japanese at the outbreak of the Second Sino-Japanese War (1937–1945) but passed unscathed through the conflict despite its location at the centre of hostilities.

Pilsner and Munich types of beers were produced, both being considered suitable to the Far Eastern climate.

Following the foundation of the People's Republic of China in 1949, new government regulations were introduced the following year which increased taxes, restricted currency exchanges and banned redundancies. The brewery was forced to reduce its prices by 17 per cent and lost $4 million annually.

In March 1952, the British consul-general in Shanghai reported that EWO Brewery chairman Robin Gordon had been arrested by the Chinese authorities. Gordon was brought before a People's Court and accused of failing to pay the wages of 240 workers. He was eventually released from prison on 20 March.

Jardines withdrew from China in 1954, selling the brewery at a loss. Thereafter it became the Huaguang Brewery (华光啤酒厂) producing beers such as "Shanghai Seagull" (上海海鸥) and "Guangming" (光明).

Today the building belongs to Tsingtao Brewery.
