= British Court for Japan =

Japanese court against British subjects

Her Britannic Majesty's Court for Japan
- 横浜英国領事裁判所
- Established: January 1, 1879
- Dissolved: 1900
- Location: British Consulate General Yokohama
- Authorised by: British extraterritorial jurisdiction
- Appeals to: British Supreme Court for China and Japan
- Number of positions: 1

The British Court for Japan (formally Her Britannic Majesty's Court for Japan) was a court established in Yokohama in 1879 to try cases against British subjects in Japan, under the principles of extraterritoriality. The court also heard appeals from British consular courts in Japan. Appeals from the British Court for Japan lay to the British Supreme Court for China and Japan based in the Shanghai International Settlement.

== Background ==
Britain acquired extraterritorial rights in Japan under the Anglo-Japanese Treaty of Amity and Commerce of 1858. British Consular officials sat as judges consular courts in all treaty ports in Japan. Until 1865 appeals from decisions of consular officials were made to the Supreme Court of Hong Kong. From 1865 appeals from decisions could be made to the British Supreme Court for China and Japan in Shanghai. Judges of the Shanghai Supreme Court were also empowered to travel to Japan to try cases on circuit.

== Establishment of Court for Japan ==
In 1871, an attempt was made to establish a branch of the Shanghai Supreme Court in Yokohama by having an acting assistant judge from Shanghai, Nicholas John Hannen, based in Yokohama. Hannen ruled this arrangement to be invalid in 1872. Judges from Shanghai remained in Yokohama but sat as a judge of the Kanagawa Consular Court. In 1877 and 1878 the legality of these arrangements were challenged by the Japanese Government when the acting law secretary, Hiram Shaw Wilkinson, ruled that the import of medicinal opium into Japan was legal. The British Government determined to establish a formal court in Japan.

On 1 January 1879 the British Court for Japan was created in Yokohama. The court had had first instance jurisdiction in Kanagawa and appellate jurisdiction from other consular courts in Japan. Appeals from the Court for Japan lay to Supreme Court in Shanghai.

== Court buildings ==
The British Court for Japan sat in the British Consulate building in Yokohama. The building was destroyed in the 1923 Great Kantō earthquake. When the judge of the court went on circuit to outlying cities he would generally sit in courts in British consulate buildings, but on occasions where important cases of great public interest were being heard would use other premises.

== End of extraterritoriality ==
Under the terms of the Anglo-Japanese Treaty of Commerce and Navigation signed in 1894, Britain gave up extraterritorial rights in Japan with effect from July 1899. The Court for Japan officially heard its last case, which had been filed before the end of July 1899, in early 1900.

== Cases ==
The court tried cases of all descriptions, all the time applying the laws of England in Japan, including murder trials before juries, divorce cases, commercial disputes and cases of petty theft.

Famous cases were:

- The Normanton incident where Captain John William Drake of Normanton was prosecuted for the manslaughter of 25 Japanese passengers who died on the ship when it sank.
- The Chishima case where the Japanese government sued the British Government for the loss of a new navy ship, the Chishima.
- The trial, in 1897, of Edith Carew for the arsenic poisoning of her husband in Yokohama. A book has also been written on this case.

== Judges ==
Between 1879 and 1900 the court had 4 full-time judges. The judges were:

- Richard Temple Rennie (Judge, Court for Japan, 1879 to 1881)
- Nicholas John Hannen (Judge, Court for Japan 1881 to 1891)
- Robert Anderson Mowat (Judge, Court for Japan, 1891 to 1897)
- Hiram Shaw Wilkinson (Judge, Court for Japan, 1897 to 1900) (also acting Judge 1894-1895)

From 1871 to 1877 two judges from Shanghai were based in Yokohama.

- Nicholas John Hannen (acting assistant judge 1871-1874)
- Charles Wycliffe Goodwin (assistant judge 1874-1877)

Between 1865 and 1872, Sir Edmund Grimani Hornby, the Chief Judge of the British Supreme Court for China and Japan also heard cases in Japan when traveling on circuit.

A number of consular officials also sat as acting Judge of the Court for Japan when the Judge was on leave or otherwise unavailable. These included:

- Russell Brooke Robertson 1881-1883
- John Carey Hall 1888
- George Jamieson 1888-1889 (from the China Consular Service)
