= William Hepburn Rennie =

William Hepburn Rennie CMG (1829 – 1874) was a British official who served in Hong Kong and St. Vincent.

Rennie was the son of the sculptor George Rennie who was a Liberal Member of Parliament and a Governor of the Falkland Islands. William's younger brother Richard Rennie became Chief Justice of the British Supreme Court for China and Japan.

Rennie entered the Colonial Service in 1851, and was acting Colonial Secretary in the Falkland Islands from April 1856 until June 1857. Rennie was in 1858 appointed Auditor-General of Hong Kong when the responsibility was split from Colonial Secretaries. He thereby received a seat of the Legislative Council of Hong Kong. He served in these offices until 1870. Rennie in 1871 transferred to the post of Lieutenant Governor of St. Vincent. Rennie was awarded the CMG in March 1874.

Rennie died in 1874 at the age of 45. Rennie's Farm and Rennie's Mill in Hong Kong were named after him.

Government offices
Preceded by William Thomas Mercer	Auditor-General of Hong Kong; 1858–1870	Succeeded by John Gardiner Austin
