= Nicholas Hannen =

Nicholas Hannen may refer to:

- Sir Nicholas John Hannen (1842–1900), British lawyer, diplomat and judge
- Nicholas Hannen (actor) (1881–1972), his son, British actor
