= John Carey Hall =

British diplomat

John Carey Hall CMG ISO (22 January 1844 – 21 October 1921) was a leading British diplomat who served in Japan in the 19th and early 20th centuries. His last position was as British Consul-General in Yokohama.

== Early life ==
Hall was born on 22 January 1844.

Hall was educated at Coleraine Academical Institution and Queen's College, Belfast.

In 1876, he married Agnes Goodwin, the daughter of Charles Wycliffe Goodwin. At the time Goodwin was the assistant judge of the British Supreme Court for China and Japan based in Yokohama

== Career ==
Hall entered Her Majesty's Consular Service in Japan in 1868, as a student interpreter. Hall spoke fluent Japanese as a result of this time in consular service.

Hall was appointed, acting Vice-Consul at Yedo (Tokyo) between 1869 and 1870.

He was called to the bar of the Middle Temple in 1881.

In 1882 he was appointed Assistant Japanese Secretary to the British Legation at Tokyo, and acting Japanese Secretary to this legation in 1884–1886. Between 1888 and 1889 he served as acting Assistant Judge of the British Supreme Court for China and Japan at Shanghai. He served as British Consul in Hiogo (now Kobe) from 1896 to 1902. He was appointed British Consul-General for Yokohama in 1902 and served in that position until 1914.

== Later life ==
Hall retired in 1914 and returned to England. He was one of the founders of the China Society in London.

He died in 1921. His wife had died in Yokohama in 1913 and been buried in the Yokohama Foreigners' Cemetery. Hall requested that he be cremated and his ashes interred in his wife's grave in Yokohama.

== Books ==
Hall published two books:

- Japanese Feudal Law ISBN 0890932115
- The Positive Science of Morals: Its Opportuneness, Its Outlines, and Its Chief Applications (with Pierre Lafitte)
