= George Rennie (sculptor) =

Scottish sculptor and politician

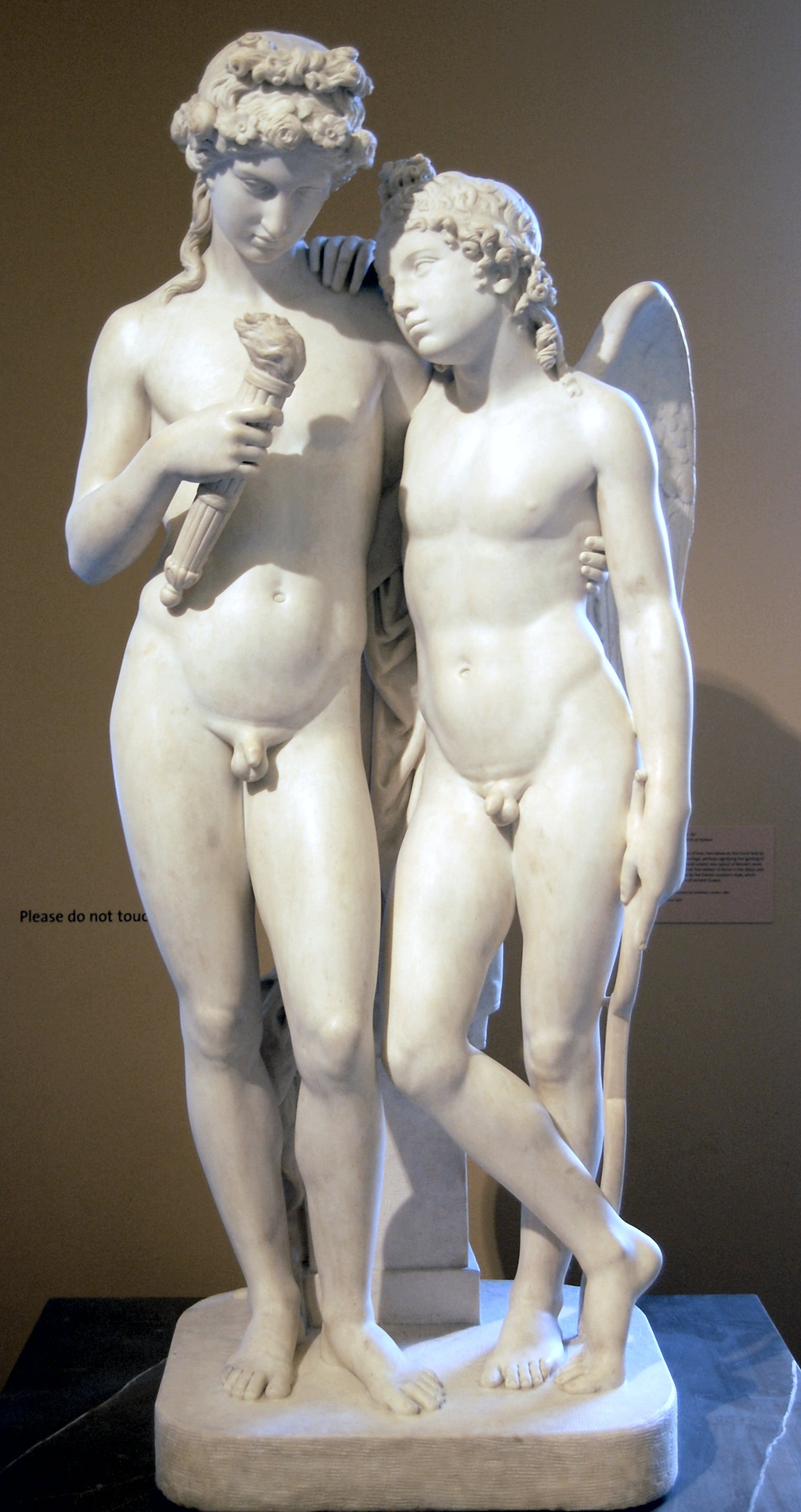
George Rennie's statue Cupid Rekindling the Torch of Hymen

George Rennie (23 April 1801 – 22 March 1860) was a Scottish sculptor, Member of Parliament (MP) for Ipswich, and Governor of the Falkland Islands between 1847 and 1855.

== Family ==
George Rennie was born on 23 April 1801 in Phantassie, East Lothian, Scotland, to the agriculturist George Rennie and Marion Rennie. He was a nephew of the engineer John Rennie.

Rennie's sons included: Richard Rennie, Chief Justice of the British Supreme Court for China and Japan; and William Hepburn Rennie, Auditor-General of Hong Kong and Lieutenant-Governor of Saint Vincent and the Grenadines.

== Arts ==
He studied sculpture in Rome before he returned to Britain to exhibit statues and busts at the Royal Academy, and three times at the Suffolk Street Gallery, from 1828 to 1837. His most important works at the academy were: A Gleaner and Grecian Archer (both 1828); Cupid and Hymen (which depicts Cupid blowing the torch of Hymen) which is now in the Victoria and Albert Museum; and busts of Bertel Thorvaldsen and his uncle John Rennie (1831). His 1833 works included: The Archer (which he afterwards presented to the Athenaeum Club, London); and a bust of the artist David Wilkie.

Rennie's 1836 suggestion, to Sir William Ewart, that he form a Parliamentary Committee for the Arts provoked the creation of design schools at Somerset House. He assisted Joseph Hume's campaign to create freedom of access to all monuments and works of art that were in public either buildings or museums.

== Political Career ==
Rennie from 1841 to 1842 was Liberal Member of Parliament (MP) for Ipswich. His election was voided in May 1842, and he withdrew from the 1847 general election to enable the election of Hugh Adair.

He in 1842 proposed the creation of a 'New Edinburgh' in New Zealand, the development of which is now called Dunedin.

Rennie on 15 December 1847 was invested as Governor of the Falkland Islands, as which he served until he returned to England in 1855. He died in London on 22 March 1860.

Parliament of the United Kingdom
Preceded by Fitzroy Kelly and Sir Thomas John Cochrane	Member of Parliament for Ipswich; 1841–1842; With: Rigby Wason	Succeeded by Otway O'Connor Cuffe and Thomas Gladstone
Political offices
Preceded by Lt. Richard Clement Moody	Governor of the Falkland Islands; 1848–1855	Succeeded by Capt. Thomas Edward Laws Moore
