= Hiram Shaw Wilkinson =

British judge and diplomat (1840-1927)

Sir Hiram Shaw Wilkinson
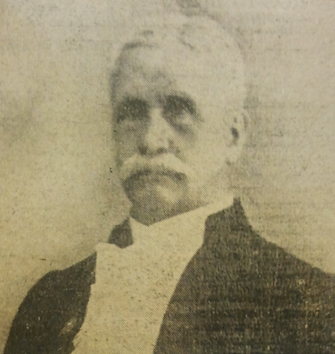

British Crown Advocate for China
- In office 1881–1897
- Preceded by: Nicholas John Hannen
- Succeeded by: Hiram Parkes Wilkinson

Judge, British Court for Japan
- In office 1897–1900
- Preceded by: Robert Mowat
- Succeeded by: Court closed

Chief Justice, British Supreme Court for China and Corea
- In office 1900–1905
- Preceded by: Nicholas John Hannen
- Succeeded by: Havilland de Sausmarez

Personal details
- Born: 13 June 1840
- Died: 27 September 1926 (aged 86) Tobermore, Northern Ireland
- Spouse: Prudie Gaffikin (m. 1864; died 1870)
- Relatives: Hiram Parkes Wilkinson (son)
- Education: Queen's College, Belfast

Sir Hiram Shaw Wilkinson, JP, DL (1840–1926) was a leading British judge and diplomat, serving in China and Japan. His last position before retirement was as Chief Justice of the British Supreme Court for China and Corea.

== Early life ==
Hiram Shaw Wilkinson was born on 13 June 1840, the son of John Wilkinson Esq., of Belfast and Annabella Shaw, daughter of William Shaw, Esq., of Holden's Valley, County Down.

In 1864, he married Prudie Gaffikin, the daughter of Thomas Gaffikin, Esq., of Belfast. He had two sons, Hiram Parkes Wilkinson, and the Reverend Thomas Gaffikin Wilkinson, both of whom were born in Yokohama, Japan. His wife died in 1870 in Yokohama. Wilkinson never remarried.

Wilkinson was educated at Queen's College, Belfast, earning a B.A. in 1864 and LL.D. in 1881.

== Career ==
Wilkinson entered Her Majesty's Consular Service in Japan in 1864, as a student interpreter. Wilkinson spoke fluent Japanese as a result of this time in consular service.

In 1872, Hiram Shaw Wilkinson was admitted to the bar of the Middle Temple. He would go on to serve in several legal and judicial offices in the Far East.

By 1876 Wilkinson was serving as 1st Assistant and interpreter at the British Consulate in Yedo (now Tokyo) as well as a Visiting Judge of the British Consular Court in Kanagawa. In 1877 he was appointed Acting Law Secretary of the British Supreme Court for China and Japan to be based in Yokohama. From 1879 to 1880 he acted as an Assistant Judge of the same court in Shanghai.

In 1882, he was appointed Crown Advocate of the Supreme Court based in Shanghai. In his position as Crown Advocate, Wilkinson, was requested to take on the responsibility of being the lead prosecutor of Edith Carew for the murder of her husband in 1896 in Yokohama. Soon after, he was appointed Judge of the British Court for Japan to succeed Robert Mowat. He was the final judge of that court which was wound down in 1900 after extraterritorial rights came to an end in Japan. He then, in 1900, was appointed Chief Justice of the British Supreme Court for China and Corea succeeding Sir Nicholas Hannen who died that year.

Wilkinson served in the consular service in Japan at the same time as Ernest Satow, the first British student interpreter in Japan and later British Minister in Japan and then China. In later years, Satow described his advice as excellent and pushed for his appointment as Judge of the British Court for Japan and Chief Justice of the British Supreme Court for China and Japan.

Wilkinson was knighted for his services in 1903. In 1905, Sir Hiram retired from the bench in Shanghai, and moved to the townland of Moneyshanere, outside Tobermore, modern-day Northern Ireland. He was succeeded by Sir Havilland de Sausmarez.

His son, Hiram Parkes Wilkinson succeeded him as Crown Advocate in Shanghai and served in that position until 1925, meaning that father and son held the position for 44 years.

== Positions held ==
During his career in the Far East, Wilkinson held the following positions.

- Vice consul at Neegata, Japan (1877 -1881) (He may never had actually been based in Niigata)
- Acting Law Secretary of the British Supreme Court for China and Japan based in Kanagawa (1877–1878)
- Acting Assistant Judge (1879–1880) of the British Supreme Court for China and Japan based in Shanghai
- Crown Advocate (1882–1897) of the British Supreme Court for China and Japan based in Shanghai
- British Commissioner for the settlement of claims after the Canton riots (1883)
- Acting Judge of the British Court for Japan (1894–1895) base in Yokohama
- Judge of the British Court for Japan (1897–1900) based in Yokohama
- Chief Justice of the British Supreme Court for China and Corea (1900–1905) based in Shanghai

== Later life ==
Wilkinson served as Pro-Chancellor of Queen's College, Belfast from 1914 until his death in 1926. In 1917, he was invited by Lloyd George to join the Irish Convention. On 18 November 1918, The Belfast Telegraph records Hiram Shaw Wilkinson donating money towards a field of battle monument dedicated to those of the 36th Ulster Division that had sacrificed their lives in World War I. In March 1922 he would receive threats from the IRA. He was also a Justice of the Peace (J.P.) and Deputy Lieutenant (D.L.) for County Londonderry.

== Death ==
Wilkinson died on 27 September 1926 in Tobermore. He was buried in the Kilcronaghan parish church graveyard in Tobermore next to his son Thomas.
