= Anglo-Japanese (disambiguation) =

Anglo-Japanese may refer to:

- Anglo-Japanese style, a hybrid artistic style
- Anglo-Japanese Friendship Treaty (14 October 1854)
- Anglo-Japanese Treaty of Amity and Commerce (26 August 1858)
- Anglo-Japanese Treaty of Commerce and Navigation (16 July 1894)
- Anglo-Japanese Alliance (30 January 1902 – 17 August 1923)

== See also ==
- Japan–United Kingdom relations
- Japan–British Exhibition (14 May 1910 – 29 October 1910)
- Japanese students in the United Kingdom
- Japanese community in the United Kingdom
