= John Gardiner Austin =

British colonial administrator (1812–1900)

John Gardiner Austin CMG
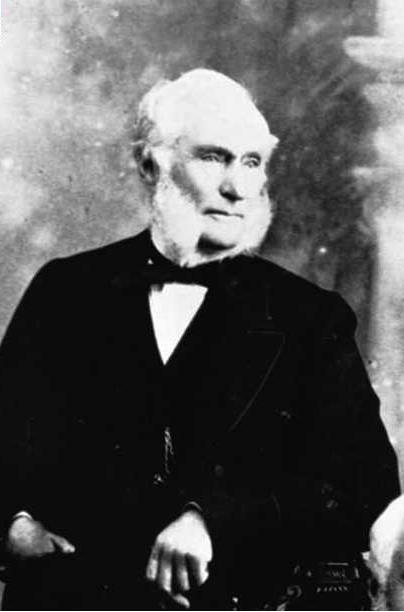
- Born: 7 August 1812; Demerara
- Died: 25 July 1900 (aged 87); Hove, East Sussex, England
- Occupations: farmer, colonial official

John Gardiner Austin CMG (Chinese: 柯士甸; 7 August 1812 – 25 July 1900) was a British colonial administrator. He was Lieutenant-Governor of British Honduras 1864–1867, and Colonial Secretary of Hong Kong from 1868 to 1879, acting as Administrator (acting Governor) of the colony in 1877.

== Background and early life ==
Austin was born in Lowlands, British Guiana to William Austin (1759-1819) and Methetabel Percy His father was a land owner born Barbados and son of slave and plantation owner Colonel Thomas Austin (b. 1729 in England - d. 1806 in Barbados). Austin later sent to England to study.

== Career ==
Austin was appointed Lieutenant-Governor of British Honduras in February 1864, and served for two years until 1867.

In 1868, he was appointed Colonial Secretary of Hong Kong, serving as such until 1879. He was also Auditor General of the colony from 1870 to 1879, and Administrator (acting Governor) from March to April 1877. He was appointed a Companion of the Order of St Michael and St George (CMG) in March 1876, for his services in Hong Kong.

== Family ==
Austin married, in 1836, Emma Wilday (1 February 1811 – 9 May 1879), and was the father of six sons and four daughters, including:

- Charles Wilday Austin (19 January 1837 – 1 December 1862)
- John Gardiner Austin (19 July 1838 – 8 March 1902), who in September 1901 was appointed a Member of the Barbados Legislative council. Sir Harold Austin was his son.
- Mehetabel Percy Austin (29 February 1840 – 27 December 1943), who married in 1862 Axel Dickson (1826–1899), a member of the Swedish parliament of Scottish origin. She was one of few people born on leap day to celebrate a centennial.

== Legacy ==
Mount Austin on Hong Kong Island, Austin Road and Austin Avenue in Kowloon were named after him. The Austin station of the MTR was so-named due to its proximity to Austin Road West, and the naming may be more influenced by geographical convenience rather than any direct link to Austin himself.

Government offices
Preceded by William Thomas Mercer	Colonial Secretary of Hong Kong; 1868–1879	Succeeded by Sir William Henry Marsh
Preceded by William Hepburn Rennie	Auditor-General of Hong Kong; 1870–1879	Succeeded by Sir William Henry Marsh
Preceded by Sir Arthur Edward Kennedy	Administrator of Hong Kong; March 1877 – April 1877	Succeeded by Sir John Pope Hennessy
