= Robert Mowat =

British judge and diplomat (1843-1925)

Judge, British Supreme Court for China and Japan
- In office 1878–1891
- Preceded by: Charles Wycliffe Goodwin
- Succeeded by: George Jamieson

Judge, British Court for Japan
- In office 1891–1897
- Preceded by: Nicholas John Hannen
- Succeeded by: Hiram Shaw Wilkinson

Personal details
- Born: 1843 Edinburgh, Scotland
- Died: 7 June 1925 (aged 81–82) Hove, England

Robert Anderson Mowat, was a British judge and diplomat, serving in China and Japan. His last position before retirement was as Judge of the British Court for Japan.

== Early life ==
Mowat was born in 1843, in Edinburgh, Scotland, the only son of Joseph Mowat. He was educated in Edinburgh before attending London University, which nominated him for the Foreign Office exam.

== Career ==
Mowat joined the British China Consular Service in 1864 as a student interpreter. In 1866, he was appointed Acting Law Secretary of the British Supreme Court for China and Japan in Shanghai. He was appointed to the substantive position in 1868. In 1869 Mowat went on long leave to study for the bar and was admitted to the bar of the Inner Temple in 1871. In 1876, he was appointed "Deputy Chief Judge", while the Acting Judge of the court, Charles Wycliffe Goodwin was in Yokohama. Due to Goodwin's ill-health and death, he held the position for most of the time until 1878 when a new Chief Judge, George French, arrived in Shanghai. In 1878, he was appointed Assistant Judge and Registrar of the Court.

In 1891, Mowat was appointed Judge of the British Court for Japan based in Yokohama. Before leaving for Japan, he acted as both British Chief Justice and Consul-General in Shanghai for over half a year until the new Chief Justice and Consul General, Nicholas John Hannen could take up the posts.

In his position as Judge for Japan, Mowat tried (with a jury) Edith Carew for the murder of her husband in 1896 in Yokohama. Soon after, he retired due to ill health and returned to England.

== Death ==
Mowat died on 7 June 1925 in Hove.
