= Edmund Grimani Hornby =

British judge (1825-1896)

Sir Edmund Grimani Hornby
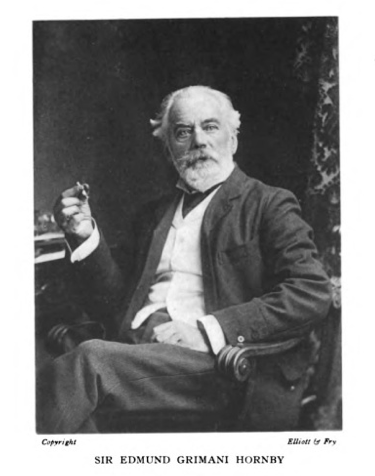

Chief Judge, Supreme British Consular Court, Constantinople
- In office 1857–1865

Chief Judge, British Supreme Court for China and Japan
- In office 1865–1876
- Preceded by: Founder
- Succeeded by: George French

Personal details
- Born: 29 May 1825 London, England
- Died: 17 November 1896 (aged 71) Rapallo, Italy

Sir Edmund Grimani Hornby (29 May 1825 – 17 November 1896) was a leading Italian British judge, with family interests in diamond-rich Antwerp. He was the founder and Chief Judge of both the British Supreme Consular Court at Constantinople and British Supreme Court for China and Japan.

(Hornby had a nephew, Edmund Hornby Grimani, who also had a career in China with the Chinese Maritime Customs. The two should not be confused).

== Early life ==
Hornby was born in London on 29 May 1825, to Thomas and Francesca Hornby. His father was from Yorkshire and his mother was the daughter of William Grimani of the Grimani family of Venice.

He was called to the bar of Middle Temple in 1848 and practiced briefly in London. In 1853, he was appointed a commissioner of Mixed British and American Commission settling outstanding individual claims between Britain and the USA. Following this, he was appointed as a commissioner of the Turkish Loan lent by Britain to Turkey during the Crimean War with Russia.

== Judicial career ==
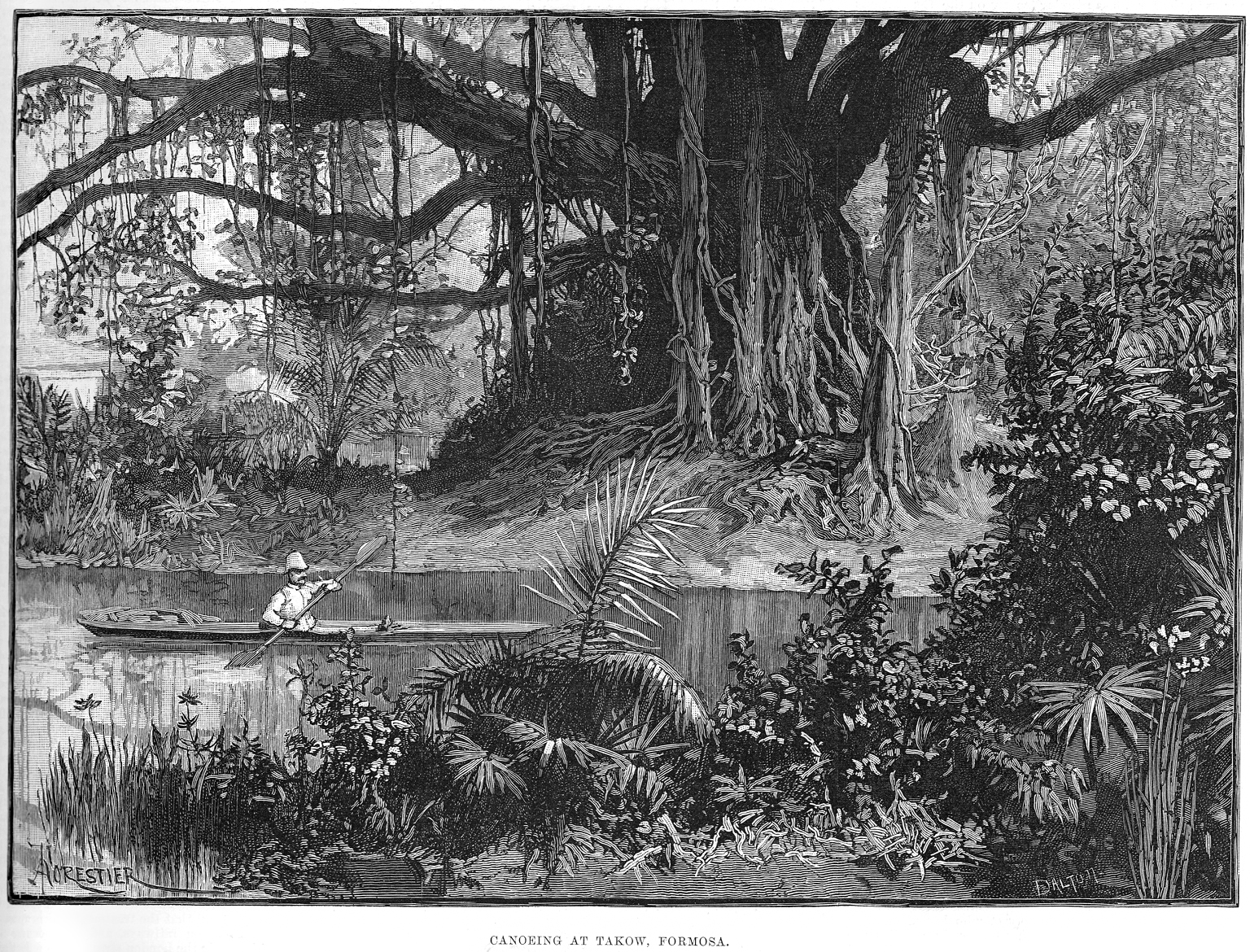
Engraving of 1890s Takow (now Kaohsiung, Taiwan) by Hornby's nephew who lived there for several months at that time.

While in Turkey, Hornby sat as a consular assessor in the British consular courts. Hornby was asked by the Foreign Office to write a report on the exercise of extraterritorial judicial powers in Turkey by consuls who had no legal training or background. Hornby recommended setting up a court with dedicated staff to handle judicial work. This was accepted and on 27 August 1857, at the age of 32, Hornby was appointed Judge of the British Supreme Consular Court at Constantinople. He was knighted five years later in 1862 at the early age of 37.

In 1865, Hornby was appointed Chief Judge of the newly established British Supreme Court for China and Japan in Shanghai. Charles Wycliffe Goodwin was appointed Assistant Judge. The court had jurisdiction over British subjects in China and Japan. Hornby served as Chief Judge for 11 years before retiring, at the age of 51 in 1876. He was succeeded by Englishman George French, the former Chief Justice of Sierra Leone.

== Post-retirement ==
After retirement, Hornby moved to Devon. He maintained an interest in international law and helped to work out a scheme that led to the establishment of the Hague Tribunal. He also wrote a pamphlet for the Peace Preservation Society, advocating the establishment in Switzerland of a school or faculty of international law to be kept up jointly by the Powers.

Hornby died in his sleep on 17 November 1896 after a long mountain climb in Rapallo, Italy, at the age of 71. He was buried in Rapallo.

== Family ==
Hornby married three times. His first wife was Emelia Macerone (sometimes spelt Maceroni), daughter of Count Maceroni, aide-de-camp of Joachim Murat, King of Naples. She died suddenly in Dieppe, France in 1866 when Hornby was in Shanghai. In 1868, he married Mary Hudson, the daughter of Mr Thomas Hudson of Hull. She died in Shanghai on 13 December 1873. In 1875, at the age of 50, he married the much younger Miss Emily Roberts, who at the time was 20, in Shanghai. She survived Hornby, dying in 1909.

His elder daughter Constance Hornby married in March 1900 William Herbert Drummond, youngest son of W. V Drummond, a barrister at Shanghai.
