= William Thomas Mercer =

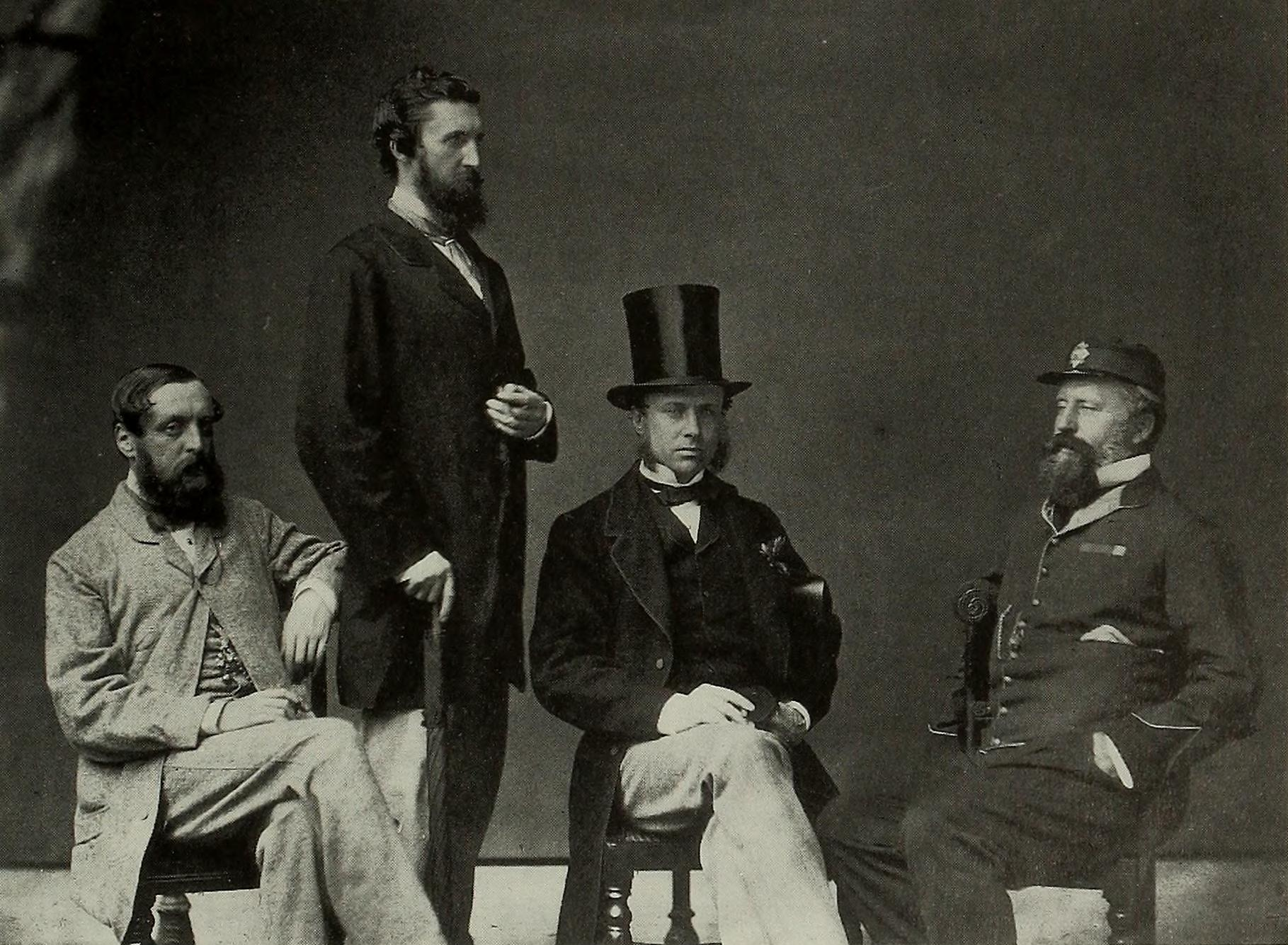
The Hong Kong Executive Council in 1860, showing William Mercer (first on left) and Governor Hercules Robinson (in tophat)

William Thomas Mercer (Chinese: 孖沙; Sidney Lau: Ma^{1} Sa^{1}) (17 October 1821 – 23 May 1879) was a British colonial administrator who served in Hong Kong from 1844 to 1866.

== Early life ==
Mercer was the third son of George Dempster Mercer, a trader born in India, and Frances Charlotte Reid, then of Edinburgh, Scotland. His parents emigrated to Tasmania and purchased land there in 1835, leaving the young Mercer behind in England. He matriculated from Exeter College, Oxford, on 30 May 1839. He became a student at the Inner Temple in 1842 and went on to earn BA and MA degrees from the University of Oxford in 1843 and 1851, respectively.

== Colonial service ==
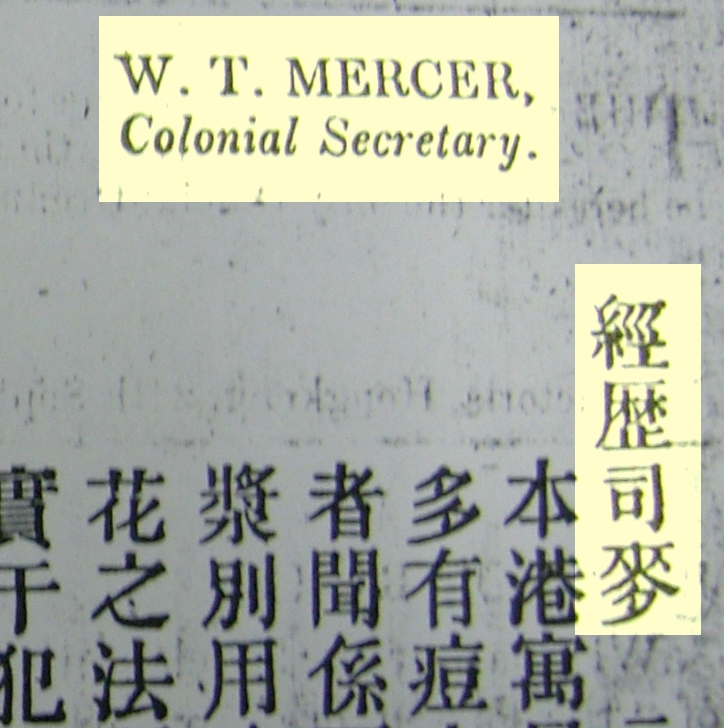
William Thomas Mercer in Hong Kong Government Gazette

Mercer arrived in Hong Kong in 1844 as Private Secretary to Sir John Davis, the second Governor of Hong Kong (1844–1848). Davis, his uncle, then appointed the 23-year-old Mercer acting colonial secretary. On 24 February 1847, he was appointed Chief Magistrate of Police.

Mercer rose through the administration, becoming Colonial Treasurer (1845–1854), Auditor General (1854–1858), Colonial Secretary (1854–1868), and, ultimately, Administrator, during a hiatus between Governors from 15 March 1865 to 11 March 1866. He was succeeded by Sir Richard Graves MacDonnell, who became the 6th Governor of Hong Kong.

== Personal life ==
Mercer married Mary Phillips Nind, born in Hargrave, Berkshire, in September 1862.

== Published works ==
In 1869, Mercer's Under the Peak; or, Jottings in Verse was published.

== Legacy ==
Mercer Street, a short and narrow road in Sheung Wan running from Jervois Street to Bonham Strand, is named after him.

Government offices
Preceded by William Caine	Auditor-General of Hong Kong; 1854–1858	Succeeded by William Hepburn Rennie
Preceded by William Caine	Colonial Secretary of Hong Kong; 1854–1868	Succeeded by John Cardiner Austin
Preceded by Sir Hercules Lord Robinson, Bt	Administrator of Hong Kong; March 1865 – March 1866	Succeeded by Sir Richard Graves MacDonnell
