= Charles Wycliffe Goodwin =

English Egyptologist, bible scholar, lawyer and judge (1817–1878)

Charles Wycliffe Goodwin Egyptologist, Bible Scholar and Judge
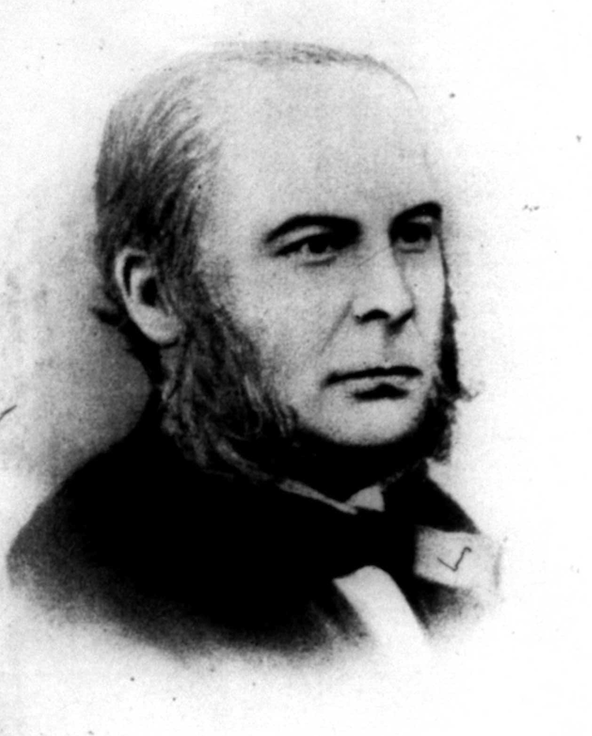

Assistant Judge, British Supreme Court for China
- In office 1865–1878
- Preceded by: New position
- Succeeded by: Robert Mowat

Personal details
- Born: 2 April 1817 King's Lynn, Norfolk
- Died: 17 January 1878 (aged 60) Shanghai International Settlement

Charles Wycliffe Goodwin (1817–1878) was an English Egyptologist, bible scholar, lawyer and judge. His last judicial position was as Acting Chief Judge of the British Supreme Court for China and Japan.

== Early life ==
Goodwin was born on 2 April 1817 in King's Lynn, Norfolk. He studied at St Catharine's College, Cambridge and graduated, in 1838, 6th Classic and senior optime in Mathematics. He became a fellow of the College. He was called to the bar at Lincoln's Inn in 1843. He lost his fellowship of St Catharine's in 1847.

== Academic Interests ==
The first papyrus publication has been credited to Goodwin, who published for the Cambridge Antiquarian Society, one of the Papyri Graecae Magicae V, translated into English with commentary in 1853. In 1860 he wrote one of the articles in Essays and Reviews, to which he was the only lay contributor, writing alongside such great theologians as Rowland Williams and Henry Bristow Wilson.

In a speech, "The Growth and Nature of Egyptology: an inaugural lecture" by Stephen Ranulph Kingdon Glanville, Glanville said of Goodwin:

"By the time Goodwin left Cambridge, he was a first class Greek scholar, an accomplished Hebraist, and an authority on Anglo-Saxon with valuable editions of new texts to his credit. He also had a considerably knowledge of natural history, especially geology. In London, where his practice was not large, he wrote music and art criticism; was for a time editor of Literary Gazette; was the only layman among the seven contributors to the much talked of Essays and Reviews (1860); and, because of his Greek and Hebrew scholarship, was frequently consulted by the Revisers of the New Testament. But throughout his life, his main interest, begun when he was at school was in the elucidation of Ancient Egyptian and Coptic texts, more especially those Egyptian texts written in the cursive script called hieratic.

In London, he spent much of his time in the British Museum, copying papyri. He was in close touch with Samuel Birch, then Keeper of the Oriental Department and was constantly exchanging information by correspondence with other leading Egyptologists of his day."

== Appointment as Judge in China and Japan ==
Goodwin was appointed Assistant Judge of the British Supreme Court for China and Japan in 1865 on the founding of the court. Sir Edmund Hornby was appointed the Chief Judge. The British Supreme Court for China and Japan exercised jurisdiction over British Subjects in China and Japan pursuant to extraterritorial rights granted under treaties with China and Japan. The Court was also an appellate court from British consular courts in China and Japan.

Goodwin served as assistant judge to Sir Edmund Hornby. Goodwin was based in Shanghai until 1874. In that year he moved to Yokohama where he was based until early 1877 when he returned to Shanghai. Goodwin became Acting Chief Judge in 1876 after Edmund Hornby retired.

== Death ==
Goodwin died in Shanghai on 17 January 1878. He was buried in the Shanghai Cemetery in Shanghai. The Shanghai Cemetery was later renamed the Pahsienjao Cemetery (八仙桥公墓). It is now Huaihai Park (淮海公園).

A bust of Goodwin was placed as part of the memorial to Auguste-Edouard Mariette at Cairo Museum.

== Works ==
- Ed. and tr. The Anglo-Saxon Version of the Life of St. Guthlac, Hermit of Crowland. London, 1848. Edition of the Old English adaptation of Felix's Latin Life of St Guthlac. PDF downloads available from Google Books and Internet Archive
- Ed. and tr. Anglo-Saxon Legends of St Andrew and St Veronica. Cambridge Antiquarian Society. Cambridge, 1851. Editions of Old English prose lives of St Andrew (Blickling Homily 19) and St Veronica (Vindicta Salvatoris). Available from Google Books here (Harvard scan) and here (Oxford scan).
- Translation of a Fabulous Tale from an Egyptian Papyrus in the British Library
- On Four Songs contained in an Egyptian Papyrus in the British Library
- On Some Japanese Legends

=== Legal works ===
- The Practice of Probate and Administration
- The Succession Duty Act
