= Richard Rennie =

British barrister and judge (1839-1905)

Sir Richard Rennie
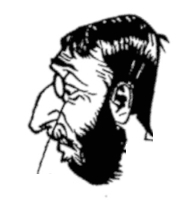

Judge, British Court for Japan
- In office 1879–1881
- Preceded by: Founder
- Succeeded by: Nicholas John Hannen

Chief Justice, British Supreme Court for China and Japan
- In office 1881–1891
- Preceded by: George French
- Succeeded by: Nicholas John Hannen
- Born: 1839
- Died: 14 April 1905 (aged 65–66); Sidmouth, Devon
- Father: George Rennie

Sir Richard Temple Rennie (1839 – 14 April 1905) was a British barrister and judge who served in China and Japan. He was the Chief Justice of the British Supreme Court for China and Japan from 1881 to 1891. He was judge of the British Court for Japan from its creation in 1879 to 1881.

== Early life ==
Rennie was the fourth son of George Rennie who had been a member of parliament and a sculptor. His great uncle was John Rennie, a famous Scots engineer who, amongst other things, designed the new London Bridge.

Rennie was called to the bar of the Inner Temple in 1860, having qualified by immediately commencing a pupilage after leaving school. He and practiced on the Western Circuit before moving to Hong Kong, where his brother, William Hepburn Rennie, was serving as Auditor-General. He then moved to Shanghai to practice before the British Supreme Court for China and Japan.

== Judicial career ==
Rennie was appointed Judge of the British Court for Japan in Yokohama on the creation of that court in 1879 and served until 1881, when he was appointed Chief Justice of the British Supreme Court for China and Japan in Shanghai, replacing George French who had died that year. Rennie was knighted on 30 November 1882.

Rennie was succeeded as both Judge for Japan and Chief Justice in Shanghai by Sir Nicholas Hannen.

== Retirement ==
Rennie retired in 1891. Rennie's successor as Chief Justice of the Supreme Court was Nicholas John Hannen, then judge of the British Court for Japan who had also succeeded Rennie in that position. In 1895, he stood as a candidate for County Council in the Kensington Division.

In 1896, Rennie was appointed by a special Order in Council Acting Judge of the British Supreme Consular Court in Constantinople to hear two cases. The first related to alleged improper conduct by the Vice-Consul, Mr Phillip Sarell, in obtaining a loan from the Constantinople Building Society. The second was a civil claim brought by Henry Silley, the former chief clerk of the Supreme Consular Court, against Sarell, Charles Tarring, the Judge of the Supreme Consular Court.

== Death ==
Rennie, who at the time lived at 115 Piccadilly in London, died in at Sidmouth, Devon on 14 April 1905.
