= George French (judge) =

British judge (1817–1881)

Chief Justice, Supreme Court of Sierra Leone
- In office 1867–1875

Chief Justice, British Supreme Court for China and Japan
- In office 1877–1881
- Preceded by: Edmund Grimani Hornby
- Succeeded by: Richard Rennie

Personal details
- Born: 1817 Tortola, the West Indies
- Died: 13 November 1881 (aged 63–64) Kobe, Japan

George French (1817–1881) was a British judge. He was the Chief Justice of both the Supreme Court of Sierra Leone and the British Supreme Court for China and Japan.

== Early life ==
French was born in 1817, in Tortola, the West Indies, His father, Mark Dyer French, was a barrister in the West Indies who had also served at one time as Registrar of the Court of Common Pleas of the British Virgin Islands. French went to Gonville and Caius College, Cambridge, where he obtained a B.A (jun. op.) in 1839 and an MA in 1842. His father died while he was at university and left him the relatively large sum for the time of £5,000.

== Career ==
French was called to the Bar at Lincoln's Inn in 1844. As a barrister, French "did not have a large business in court." But he was well known in the courts as a law reporter for The Times and the Law Journal in the court of the Vice Chancellor. For a number of years he sat as a deputy county court judge.

In 1867 French was appointed Chief Justice of the courts of Sierra Leone. He also sat as a Judge of the Mixed Courts in Sierra Leone from 1871 to 1875. In his capacity as Chief Justice, he was also Acting Governor of Sierra Leone from December 1874 to 1875. In 1875, the Sierra Leone government faced serious financial difficulties and French was placed on a pension.

In 1877, French was appointed Chief Judge of the British Supreme Court for China and Japan in Shanghai, replacing Sir Edmund Hornby. In 1878, his title was changed to Chief Justice.

== Family ==
French was married to Emma French. They had 4 sons, George M, Robert W, Edward Henry and Alfred W. He also had one daughter, Mary Ada.. Mary married to George A. Lindsay in Shanghai in 1882.

== Death ==
French died in office in Kobe on November 13, 1881. He was buried in Onohama Cemetery in Kobe. His coffin was carried to the cemetery by sailors from HMS Flying Fish. He was succeeded by Richard Rennie.

His grave was moved to Futatabi Cemetery after World War II where it remains to this day.
