= Nicholas John Hannen =

British barrister, diplomat and judge (1842-1900)

Sir Nicholas Hannen
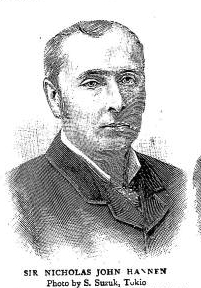

British Crown Advocate for China
- In office 1878–1881
- Preceded by: New position
- Succeeded by: Hiram Shaw Wilkinson

Judge, British Court for Japan
- In office 1881–1891
- Preceded by: Richard Rennie
- Succeeded by: Robert Mowat

Chief Justice, British Supreme Court for China and Japan
- In office 1891–1900
- Preceded by: Richard Rennie
- Succeeded by: Hiram Shaw Wilkinson

Personal details
- Born: 24 August 1842
- Died: 27 April 1900 (aged 57) Shanghai International Settlement
- Relatives: James Hannen (brother); Nicholas Hannen (son)

Sir Nicholas John Hannen (24 August 1842 – 27 April 1900) was a British barrister, diplomat and judge who served in China and Japan. He was the Chief Justice of the British Supreme Court for China and Japan from 1891 to 1900 and also served concurrently as Consul-General in Shanghai from 1891 to 1897. He was judge of the British Court for Japan from 1881 to 1891. He was the brother of James Hannen, a noted British judge of the 19th century. His son, Nicholas "Beau" Hannen was a famous actor of the early and mid-20th century.

== Early life ==
Hannen was born on 24 August 1842. He was the 6th son (and 13th child) of James Hannen of Kingswood, Dulwich. He was educated at the City of London School and University College London where he obtained a BA in 1862 with honours in logic and moral philosophy. He was called to the Bar at the Inner Temple in 1866. Soon after qualifying as a barrister, in 1868 Hannen moved to Shanghai to commence practice as a barrister. He married in 1869 to Jessie Woodhouse, the daughter of James Woodhouse of Henley-on-Thames.

== Career ==
Hannen held the following appointments in China and Japan:

- Acting Assistant Judge of the British Supreme Court for China and Japan based in Yokohama (1871 to 1874)
- Crown Advocate, Shanghai (1878 to 1881)
- Judge of the British Court for Japan (1881 to 1891)
- Acting Chief Justice of the British Supreme Court for China and Japan (1881 to 1883)
- Chief Justice of the British Supreme Court for China and Japan (1891 to 1900)
- British Consul-General, Shanghai (1891 to 1897)

From 1871 to 1874 he was appointed Acting Assistant Judge of the British Supreme Court for China and Japan and was based in Yokohama, period during which he assisted Oe Taku during the Maria Luz incident. Following this, he returned to Shanghai to private practice. In 1878 he was appointed Crown Advocate of the Supreme Court, a position akin to that of a colonial attorney general. The Crown Advocate was allowed to accept cases from private clients that did not affect their duties as Crown Advocate.

In 1881, he was appointed as Judge for the British Court for Japan in Yokohama. Before taking up the appointment, he acted as Chief Justice of the British Supreme Court for China and Japan for more than one year until the new Chief Justice, Sir Richard Rennie, returned from long leave to take up the post.

In 1891, on Rennie's retirement, he was appointed as Chief Justice of the British Supreme Court for China and Japan and Consul-General in Shanghai. This appointment was the first and only time the Chief Justice also served as Consul-General. There was much opposition from foreign residents in China to the amalgamation of the positions. The opposition was not based on Hannen's ability but rather that it was inappropriate for one man to hold a judicial and executive position at the same time. The position of Chief Justice and Consul General were separated in 1897 and Hannen continued as Chief Justice. George Jamieson who had been Assistant Judge and Consul was appointed Consul-General. Frederick Bourne took over the position of Assistant Judge.

Hannen was knighted on 18 July 1895 at Windsor Castle and received the Jubilee Medal in 1897.

== Death ==
Hannen was due to retire in May 1900. He died of heart failure, brought on by an attack of pneumonia on 27 April 1900. His death came just two weeks before his planned retirement and departure from Shanghai for the town of Wargrave, near Reading, Berkshire, where he owned a house, Lake Lodge. Funeral services were conducted for Hannen at Trinity Cathedral in Shanghai and he was given full honours. Marines from HMS Hermione acted as an honour guard and pallbearers.

He was cremated and his ashes taken back to England. In 1907 his ashes were lodged in the Hannen Mausoleum, a columbarium designed by Edwin Lutyens and built for the Hannen family in the churchyard of St Mary's Church in Wargrave.

Hannen's successor as Chief Justice of the Supreme Court was Hiram Shaw Wilkinson, then judge of the British Court for Japan who had also succeeded Hannen as Crown Advocate in 1881.

== Legacy ==
Hannen Road (海能路) in Shanghai was named for Hannen. It has now been renamed Hainan Road (海南路).
