= Extraterritoriality =

State of being exempted from the jurisdiction of local law

Extraterritoriality or exterritoriality is a term of doctrine used in law, particularly international law, to denote the circumstance of either being exempt from "foreign" laws or the application of foreign laws against an entity otherwise outside of its jurisdiction. In the case of the former, it is usually as the result of diplomatic negotiations while the latter concerns notions of hard power.

Historically, this primarily applied to individuals, as jurisdiction was usually claimed on peoples rather than on lands. Extraterritoriality can also be partly applied to physical places. For example, such is the immunity granted to diplomatic missions, military bases of foreign countries, or offices of the United Nations. The three most common cases recognized today internationally relate to the persons and belongings of foreign heads of state and government, the persons and belongings of ambassadors and other diplomats, and ships in international waters.

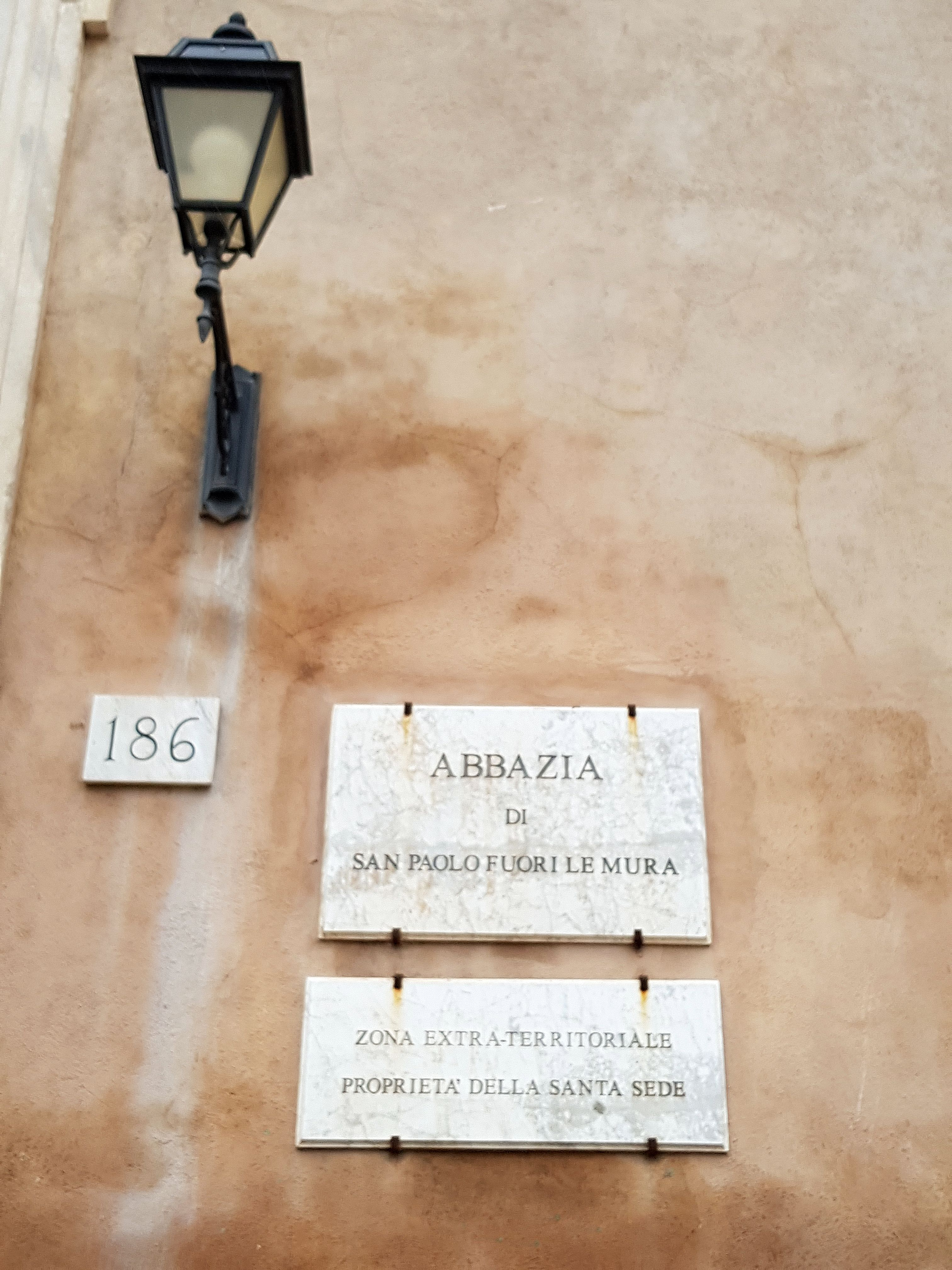
Plaque on an external wall of the Basilica of Saint Paul Outside the Walls (Rome) indicating its extraterritorial status

== Forms ==
In the past, pre-modern states generally claimed sovereignty over persons, creating something known as personal jurisdiction. As people move between borders, this led, in the framework of a territorial jurisdiction, to certain persons being under the laws of countries in which they did not reside. Extraterritoriality, in this sense, emerges from the interaction of these two conceptions of jurisdiction, personal and territorial, when laws are applied based on who a person is rather than where they are.

Extraterritoriality can now take various forms. Most famous are examples of diplomatic extraterritoriality, where diplomats and their belongings do not operate under the laws of their host nations, but rather, under the laws of the diplomat's nation.

Similarly, many nations claim the right to prosecute foreign combatants and violators of human rights under doctrines of universal jurisdiction, irrespective of the nationality of those persons or the place in which the alleged crimes occurred. This extends to domestic criminal codes as well: for example, the People's Republic of China claims the right to prosecute Chinese citizens for crimes committed abroad and Canada will prosecute sexual abuse of minors by a Canadian anywhere in the world.

In some military and commercial agreements, nations cede legal jurisdiction for foreign bases or ports to other countries. For example, Japan cedes jurisdiction over American military bases on its soil in Okinawa to US military tribunals pursuant to a bilateral status of forces agreement.

In maritime law, a ship in international waters is governed by the laws of the jurisdiction in which that ship is registered. This can be conceived of as a form of extraterritoriality, where a nation's jurisdiction extends beyond its border.

== Historical cases ==
=== 14th century ===
During the 13th and 14th centuries, the Italian sea republics of Genoa, Venice and Pisa obtained extraterritoriality for their merchants who operated in designated quarters (Pera and Galata) in the Byzantine capital, Constantinople, as well as in Egypt and the Barbary states.

=== Ottoman Empire ===
A series of capitulations were made in the form of treaties between the Sublime Porte and Western nations, from the sixteenth through the early nineteenth centuries. The legal impenetrability of the Ottoman legal code created during the Tanzimat era began to weaken continuously through the spread of European empires and the prevalence of legal positivism.

The laws and regulations created for Ottoman subjects to abide by often did not apply to European nationals conducting business and trade in the provinces of the empire, and thus various capitulations were brought into effect with respect to many foreign powers. The various overlapping governmental laws led to legal pluralism in which jurisdiction often was left up to the great powers to institute and organize their own legal structures to represent their citizens abroad.

The capitulations ceased to have effect in Turkey in 1923, by virtue of the Treaty of Lausanne, and in Egypt they were abolished by the Montreux Convention in 1949.

=== British India ===
During the Second World War, the military personnel of the Allied forces within the British Raj were governed by their own military codes by the Allied Forces Ordinance, 1942 and the members of the United States Armed Forces were entirely governed by their own laws, even in criminal cases.

=== United States ===
Historically, the United States has had extraterritoriality agreements with 15 nations with non-Western legal systems: Algeria, Borneo, China, Egypt, Iran, Japan, South Korea, Libya, Madagascar, Morocco, Samoa, Tanzania, Thailand, Tunisia, and the Ottoman Empire. Americans in the military or civilians working on American military bases overseas generally have extraterritoriality, so they can only be tried by the U.S. military. This is regulated by a status of forces agreement.

=== Canada ===
Princess Margriet of the Netherlands was born on 19 January 1943 in Ottawa Civic Hospital in Ottawa, Ontario, as the family had been living in Canada since June 1940 after the occupation of the Netherlands by Nazi Germany. The maternity ward of Ottawa Civic Hospital in which Princess Margriet was born was temporarily declared to be extraterritorial by the Canadian government. Making the maternity ward outside of the Canadian domain caused it to be unaffiliated with any jurisdiction and technically international territory. This was done to ensure that the newborn would derive her citizenship from her mother only, thus making her solely Dutch, which could be very important had the child been male, and as such, the heir of Princess Juliana.

=== East Asia ===
The most famous cases of extraterritoriality in East Asia are those of 19th century China, Japan, and Siam, emerging from what is termed the "unequal treaties". The practice of extraterritoriality, however, was not confined to the 19th century or these nations, as the monarchs and governments of pre-modern East Asia primarily claimed sovereignty over people rather than tracts of land.

==== China ====
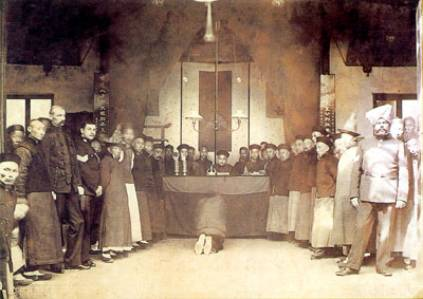
A hearing of the International Mixed Court at Shanghai, c. 1905

The creation of extraterritoriality for treaty nations "was not introduced into East Asia ex novo, but built atop a long-standing legal edifice". Jurisdiction in Qing China, with differential treatment for civilian subjects and Eight Bannners subjects, was not determined by geography, but rather, by the status of the subjects. For example, Banner people possessed legal privileges which placed them outside the jurisdiction of local civil administrators; they were administered through a separate Banner apparatus, with special regulations and procedures stemming from their status as members of the hereditary military establishment.

Before the 1842 Treaty of Nanking, which ended the First Opium War, foreign merchants were not satisfied with the state of the Qing legal system. Prior to the Treaty, British merchants were only able to trade in the region of Canton, exclusively with Chinese merchants called Cohongs. Chinese merchants benefitted significantly out of the deal, contributing to the British dissatisfaction with the Chinese. British merchants were "suspicious of what they regarded as a tendency in the Qing legal order to impose collective responsibility; they were also resentful of the Qing practice of meting out capital punishment in cases of accidental manslaughter". After the Lady Hughes affair, a controversial 1784 incident where a British sailor was executed for fatally wounding two Chinese subjects while firing a gun salute, East India Company officials generally spirited away Britons before Qing officials could react.

Grants of extraterritoriality were regular in China. In the 1830s, when the Qing government concluded a treaty with the Uzbek khanate of Khoqand, it granted extraterritorial privileges to its traders. And in dealing with foreign merchants through the centuries, the Qing government rarely attempted to impose jurisdiction based on territorial sovereignty, instead entrusting the punishment of foreigners to the respective authority in practically all cases except homicide.

At the negotiations of the Treaty of Nanjing, Qing negotiators readily extended a grant of extraterritoriality. Cassel writes "the imperial commissioner and Manchu nobleman Qiying readily conceded extraterritorial privileges to the British in an exchange of notes with Pottinger [the British plenipotentiary] at the time of the conclusion of the treaty". This was in line with Qing practices at the time, where sovereignty was held by peoples rather than imposed on lands.

A more formal declaration of extraterritoriality was concluded in the 1843 Supplementary Treaty of the Bogue, which established that "Britons were to be punished according to English law and Chinese were to be 'tried and punished by their own laws'". These provisions only applied to the treaty ports, since foreigners were barred from entering the Chinese interior.

Under imperial edict earlier in the year, these privileges were extended to most western countries. Other nations wanted reassurances and guarantees. For example, the United States negotiated the 1844 Treaty of Wanghia, which stated in article 21:

Subjects of China who may be guilty of any criminal act towards citizens of the United States shall be arrested and punished by the Chinese authorities according to the laws of China, and citizens of the United states who may commit any crime in China shall be subject to be tried and punished only by the Consul or other public functionary of the United States thereto authorised according to the laws of the United States.

The Wanghia treaty included an exception for American trading in opium and also subjected American ships trading outside treaty ports to confiscation by the Chinese government in articles 33 and 3. Similarly, the French also pursued protections in the Treaty of Huangpu, which further introduced a distinction between criminal and civil jurisdiction (non-existent in Qing dynasty law) and gave Frenchmen the full protections of Chinese law outside concessionary areas.

The 1858 Sino-British Treaty of Tientsin, which ended the Second Opium War, expanded the rights of western visitors. They were permitted to enter the Chinese interior after passporting. However, extraterritorial rights were not extended outside the treaty ports. Similar rights were granted to the interested western powers due to the "most-favoured-nation" clause: all privileges the Qing empire granted to one power were automatically granted to the others. In 1868, when the Tientsin treaties were renegotiated, British merchants clamoured to lift the travel restrictions on the Chinese interior. The Qing position was adamantly opposed, unless extraterritoriality was also abolished. No compromise was reached; and the Qing government was successful in preventing foreigners from visiting the Chinese interior with extraterritorial privileges.

Extraterritorial rights were not limited to Western nations. Under the 1871 Sino-Japanese Friendship and Trade Treaty, Japan and China granted each other reciprocal extraterritorial rights. China itself imposed reciprocal extraterritoriality rights for its own citizens in Joseon Korea. However, in 1895, under the Treaty of Shimonoseki after the First Sino-Japanese War, China gave up its extraterritorial rights in Japan, without reciprocity.

===== International Mixed Court =====
By far the most important of the treaty ports established after 1842 was Shanghai, where the vague extraterritoriality provisions of the various treaties were most sophisticatedly implemented. The two main courts judging extraterritorial cases were the Shanghai Mixed Court and the British Supreme Court for China. Similar courts were established for treaty countries, e.g. the United States Court for China. These had jurisdiction over the concession areas, which formally remained under Qing sovereignty. Initially, Chinese people who committed crimes in, say, the British zone, were remanded to Chinese authorities.

===== End of extraterritoriality in China =====
By the early 20th century, some Western powers were willing to relinquish extraterritorial rights given the improved state of Chinese legal reform. For example, the 1902 Sino-British "Mackay treaty"'s article 12 read:

China having expressed a strong desire to reform her judicial system ... [the United Kingdom] will ... be pretreated to relinquish her extra-territorial rights when she is satisfied that the state of the Chinese laws, the arrangement for her administration, and other considerations warrant her in so doing.

Qing law did not make a formal distinction between criminal and civil law. While efforts at legal reform were pursued in earnest in the last decade of the Qing dynasty, what was actually achieved failed to meaningfully address this lack of law in the areas of contracts, trade, or commerce.

After the collapse of the Chinese government in 1911 and the ensuing administrative vacuum, the Chinese members of the Mixed Court were subsequently appointed by the Western powers, placing all inhabitants of the international settlement under de facto foreign jurisdiction. The success of the Northern Expedition in strengthening the authority of the Chinese republic in the mid-1920s led many governments to give up their more minor treaty ports without a fight. However, the treaty powers were unwilling to give up Shanghai, or their privileges within it, which remained the most prominent economic centre and treaty port. It was only after a confrontation between Shanghai police and Nationalist demonstrators in 1925 that Chinese authorities refused to enforce the verdicts of the Mixed Court; this led to its disestablishment in 1927 and replacement with a Chinese-run local court.

In 1921, at the Conference on the Limitation of Armament in Washington, an international treaty called the Nine-Power Treaty was signed which expressed the willingness of the parties to end extraterritoriality in China once a competent legal system was established by China. As a result, a commission was established in 1926 that published a detailed report which contained its findings and recommendations for the Chinese legal system.

Extraterritoriality in China for non-diplomatic personnel ended at various times in the 20th century. Germany and Austria-Hungary lost their rights in China in 1917 after China declared war on them. The Soviet Union made secret agreements that kept its rights until 1960, although it publicly falsely stated that it gave them up in 1924.

In 1937, the status of the various foreign powers was thus:

Status of extraterritoriality with respect to China (1937)
| Ceased to have effect | No extraterritorial rights | Will surrender privileges "when all other powers do so" | Rights continued to have effect |
|---|---|---|---|
| Germany (surrendered as a consequence of World War I); Austria (surrendered as a consequence of World War I); Hungary (surrendered as a consequence of World War I); Mexico (lapsed in 1928); Denmark (relinquished in 1929); Spain (relinquished in 1929); Italy (relinquished in 1929); Belgium (relinquished in 1929); Portugal (relinquished in 1929) | Bolivia; Chile; Czechoslovakia; Finland; Greece; Iran; Poland; Turkey; Cuba; Uruguay; Panama; Bulgaria | Norway; Sweden; Switzerland | Brazil; France; United Kingdom; Japan; Netherlands; United States; Soviet Union |

In 1929, the Nationalist government announced its goal of completely abolishing extraterritoriality. In response, several countries, including Denmark, Spain, Italy, Belgium, and Portugal, agreed to relinquish their extraterritorial rights in China that same year. However, Italy retained extraterritorial status within the concession of Tianjin, while Portugal maintained similar rights in Macau. Negotiations with Britain, the main holder of such rights, went slowly. They ended with the Japanese invasion of 1937 when Japan seized Shanghai and the main treaty ports where extraterritoriality was in operation. When both countries declared war on Japan in late 1941, they became formal allies of China and made ending extraterritoriality an urgent goal which both the U.S. and Britain fulfilled with the treaties they signed with China in 1943. The November 1943 Cairo Conference formally ended extraterritoriality, foreign concessions, and the unequal treaties.

===== Legacy =====
The legacy of this for jurisdictional control continues to the modern day. Cassel writes, "extraterritoriality has left many policy-makers in mainland China with a legacy of deeply felt suspicions toward international law, international organisations, and more recently, human rights". With part of its legitimacy resting on claims to strengthening national sovereignty and territorial integrity, the Constitution of China explicitly states that foreigners must abide by Chinese law. And the PRC government claims the right, under article 10 of its criminal code, to prosecute Chinese citizens for crimes against the criminal code which are committed abroad, even if already punished for the crime. These emerge from significant claims of the importance of national sovereignty, a reaction to its abridgement in the past, where almost no nations emphasise the importance of their sovereignty more than China does today.

==== Japan ====
Japan recognized extraterritoriality in the treaties concluded with the United States, the United Kingdom, France, Netherlands, and Russia in 1858, in connection with the concept of the "most favoured nation". Various commercial treaties extended extraterritorial protections in Japan with various parties, including with Peru, in 1873. Most countries exercised extraterritorial jurisdiction through consular courts. Britain established the British Court for Japan in 1879.

In 1887, only 2,389 non-Chinese foreigners lived in Japan, with strict limitations on freedom of movement. These limitations meant that foreigners in Japan were not able to commit crime with impunity, in contrast with China, where foreigners were granted the ability to travel to the interior after passporting. Rather, it was in the context of the Japanese state's desire to eliminate all competing jurisdictions and calls for legal reform based on the models of those jurisdictions that Japan's government desired to abolish foreign courts.

Having convinced the Western powers that its legal system was "sufficiently modern", Japan succeeded in reforming its unequal status with Britain through the 1894 Anglo-Japanese Treaty of Commerce and Navigation, in which London would relinquish its Japanese extraterritorial rights within five years. Similar treaties were signed with other extraterritorial powers around the same time. These treaties all came into effect in 1899, ending extraterritoriality in Japan.

After the Allied victory in 1945, the Mutual Security Assistance Pact, and its successor treaties, between the United States, to the modern day, grant US military personnel on American bases in Okinawa extraterritorial privileges.

==== Siam ====
King Mongkut (Rama IV) of Siam signed the Bowring Treaty granting extraterritorial rights to Britain in 1855. Sir Robert Hermann Schomburgk, British Consul-General from 1859 to 1864, gives an account of his judicial training and responsibilities in a letter to his cousin dated 6 September 1860. Unequal treaties were later signed with 12 other European powers and with Japan. In 1917, Siam terminated the extraterritorial rights of German Empire and Austria-Hungary as it declared war on them.

In 1925–1926, the treaties were revised to provide for consular jurisdiction to be terminated, and nationals of the parties to the treaty were to come under the jurisdiction of Thai courts after the introduction of all Thai legal codes and a period of 5 years thereafter. By 1930, extraterritoriality was in effect no longer in force. After absolute monarchy was replaced by constitutional monarchy in the bloodless Siamese revolution of 1932, the constitutional government promulgated a set of legal codes, setting the stage for new treaties signed in 1937–1938 which canceled extraterritorial rights completely.

Elimination of extraterritoriality with respect to Siam
| Abolished in 1909 | Abolished in 1917 | Abolished in 1937–38 |
|---|---|---|
| United Kingdom | Germany; Austria-Hungary | Switzerland; Belgium; Luxembourg; Denmark; Sweden; United States; Norway; Italy; France; Japan; Netherlands; Portugal |

== Current examples ==
Contrary to popular belief, diplomatic missions do not necessarily enjoy full extraterritorial status and are not sovereign territory of the represented state. However, such agreements regarding embassies and diplomatic missions may be reached by treaty.

=== Countries ceding some control but not sovereignty ===
Countries which have ceded some control over their territory (for example, the right to enter at will for law enforcement purposes) without ceding sovereignty include:

- Extraterritorial properties of the Holy See in Italy
- Headquarters of the Sovereign Military Order of Malta in Rome
- Fort St. Angelo in Malta (only partial)
- The headquarters of the European Commission in Brussels, Belgium (as well as the building of the European Parliament there)
- The seat of the European Parliament in Strasbourg, France
- United Nations headquarters in New York, United Nations offices in Geneva, Vienna, Bonn, Nairobi, The Hague (International Court of Justice), Hamburg (International Tribunal for the Law of the Sea), Copenhagen and elsewhere.
- CERN (European Organization for Nuclear Research) – for convenience, some facilities that cross into France are under Swiss jurisdiction
- European Patent Office in Munich, Berlin, and The Hague
- French national domain in the Holy Land
- International Maritime Organization Headquarters in London
- Juxtaposed controls for the Channel Tunnel. The United Kingdom has pre-boarding passport checks in France and Belgium, and France or Belgium operate passport checks in the UK.
- The Pays Quint is located on Spanish soil but rented by France since an 1856 treaty
- Saimaa Canal is partly located in Russia, but the Russian part is rented by Finland
- In Svalbard, which is part of Norway, other countries have the right to extract some natural resources and build establishments for this
- Japan–Djibouti Status of Forces Agreement
- Supreme Headquarters Allied Powers Europe, the military headquarters of the North Atlantic Treaty Organization, in Belgium
- Khmeimim Air Base in Syria is leased to the Russian Air Force for a period of 49 years, with the Russian Federation having extraterritorial jurisdiction over the air base and its personnel.
- Tomb of Suleyman Shah of Turkey in Syria
- Various free ports exist outside the main customs territory of their host country.
- The national pavilions of the Venice Biennale
- The Russian Federation maintains a lease until 2050 on the Baikonur Cosmodrome in Kazakhstan in the city of Baikonur

=== Transfers of ownership of land ===
Special concessions are sometimes made for cemeteries and memorials. National governments can also own property or special concessions in other host countries without gaining any sort of legal jurisdiction or sovereignty, in which case they are treated similarly to other private property owners. For example, ownership of land under the John F. Kennedy Memorial at Runnymede, England, was given to the United States by the United Kingdom, but required an Act of Parliament (the John F. Kennedy Memorial Act 1964) to do so, because the land was part of the Crown Estate, which cannot otherwise be given away for free. Another example of these types of special concessions are the numerous cemeteries and monuments administered by the American Battle Monuments Commission. These are located in Belgium, Cuba, France, Gibraltar, Italy, Luxembourg, Mexico, Morocco, the Netherlands, Panama, Papua New Guinea, the Philippines, the Solomon Islands, Tunisia, and the United Kingdom. The most popular site among these is the Normandy American Cemetery and Memorial in France. Land under the Canadian National Vimy Memorial and surrounding 100 hectares was gifted by France to Canada.

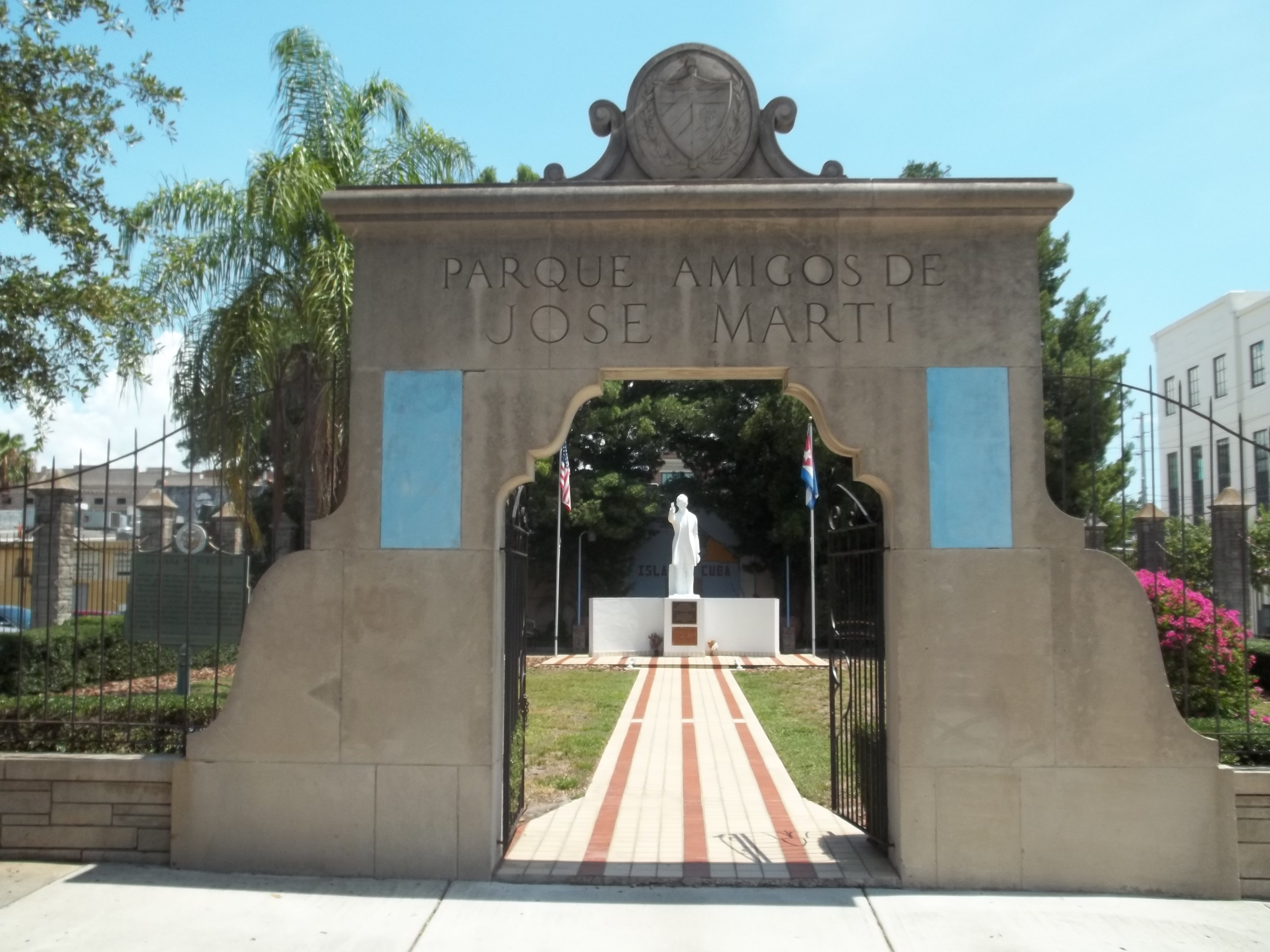
José Martí Park in Tampa, Florida, was donated to Cuba in 1956.

A similar case is the French domains of St Helena: the Government of France bought land property on St. Helena island to commemorate the exile of Napoleon Bonaparte there. Ownership of José Martí Park in Tampa, Florida was donated to the Cuban government by its previous owners in 1956. Cuban president Fulgencio Batista's administration accepted the property and its donation was certified by the US Embassy in Havana.

=== Internal cases ===
Internal cases (both parties are part of the same unitary sovereign state but have different border control and legal systems):

- Shenzhen Bay Port in Shenzhen, Guangdong where an area in a port is leased by Shenzhen to the Hong Kong Special Administrative Region and Hong Kong law applies. Although both jurisdictions, Shenzhen and Hong Kong, are in the same country, Hong Kong maintains a common law legal system different from the civil law system in Mainland China. Hong Kong law now applies in the port area.
- Hengqin Campus of University of Macau in Zhuhai, Guangdong, administered by Macau SAR in a situation similar to above
- Macau half of Hengqin Border Crossing, adjacent to above

== Obligations ==
Extraterritorial Obligations (ETOs) are obligations in relation to the acts and omissions of a state, within or beyond its territory, that have effects on the enjoyment of human rights outside of that state's territory.

== See also ==
- Akmal Shaikh
- Antarctic Treaty System
- Basilica Major
- British Supreme Court for China and Japan
- British Court for Japan
- Demilitarized zone
- Diplomatic immunity
- Embassy church
- Enclave and exclave
- EuroAirport Basel-Mulhouse-Freiburg
- Extraterritorial jurisdiction
- Extraterritorial operation
- Harris Treaty
- Hashemite custodianship of Jerusalem holy sites
- Imperialism in Asia
- International waters
- International zone
- Law of the Sea
- Moon Treaty
- Neutral territory
- Outer Space Treaty
- Prerogative
- Rasul v. Bush
- Status of forces agreement
- Terra nullius
- U.S.–Japan Status of Forces Agreement
- United Nations Headquarters
- List of territories governed by the United Nations
