= British Supreme Court for China =

1865–1943 British court in China

His Britannic Majesty's Supreme Court for China
- 英國在華最高法院／大英按察使司衙門
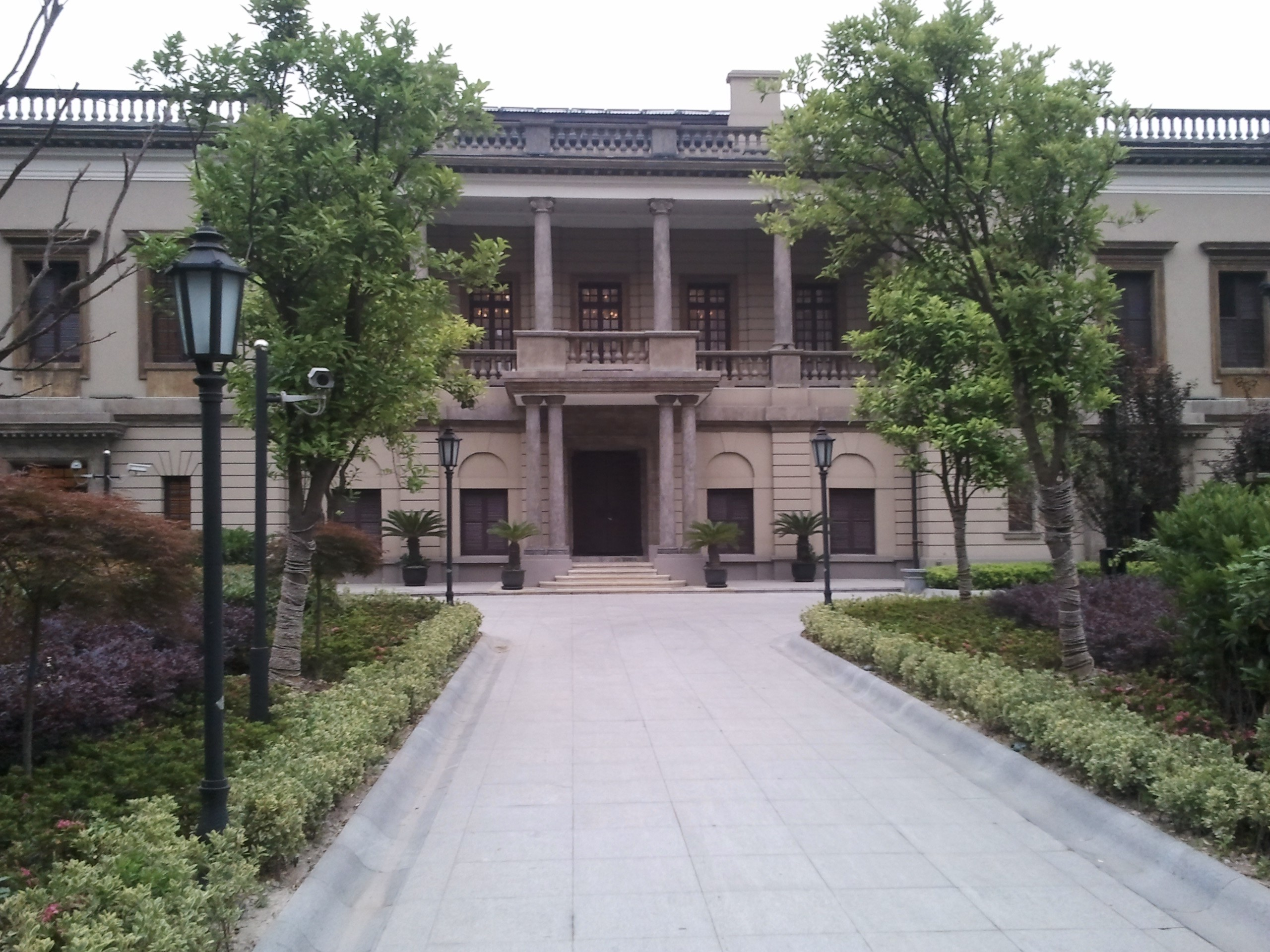
- British Supreme Court for China Building, Shanghai
- Established: September 1, 1865
- Dissolved: May 20, 1943
- Jurisdiction: China (1865–1943); Japan (1865–1899); Korea (1884–1910)
- Location: No. 33, The Bund; Shanghai International Settlement
- Authorised by: British extraterritorial jurisdiction
- Appeals to: Judicial Committee of the Privy Council (to 1925); Full court (from 1925)
- Number of positions: Two: Chief Judge and Assistant Judge

British Supreme Court for China
- Traditional Chinese: 英國在華最高法院
- Simplified Chinese: 英国在华最高法院
Transcriptions
Standard Mandarin
- Hanyu Pinyin: Yīngguó zài Huá Zuìgāofǎyuàn
- Wade–Giles: Ying-kuo tsai Hua Tsui-kao-fa-yüan

The British Supreme Court for China (originally the British Supreme Court for China and Japan) was a court established in the Shanghai International Settlement to try cases against British subjects in China, Japan and Korea under the principles of extraterritoriality.

The court also heard appeals from consular courts in China, Japan and Korea and from the British Court for Japan which was established in 1879.

== History of the court ==
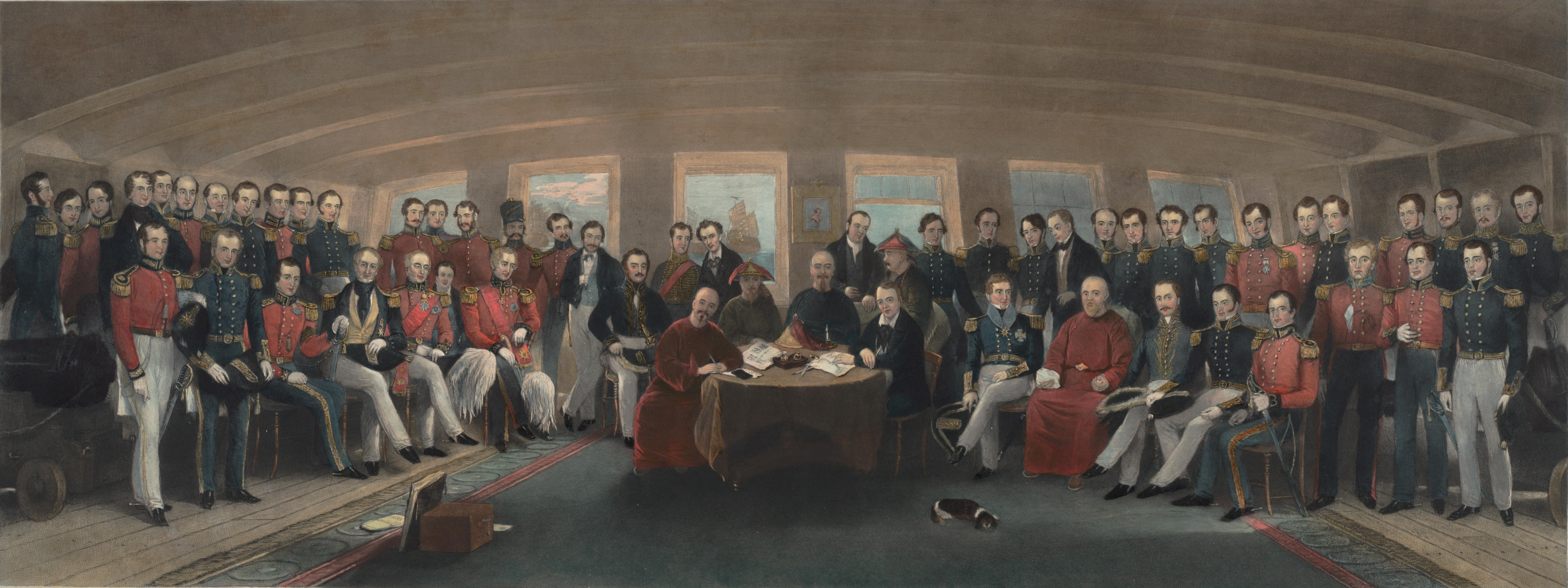
Signing of the Treaty of Nanking

Britain had acquired extraterritorial rights in China under the Treaty of Nanking in 1842. The United States obtained further extraterritorial rights under the Treaty of Wanghsia, which Britain was able to take advantage of under the Most Favoured Nation provision in a Supplemental Agreement to the Treaty of Nanking. Subsequently, under the Treaty of Tientsin, these rights were provided for directly in a Sino-British Treaty. In 1858, Britain obtained extraterritorial rights in Japan under the Anglo-Japanese Treaty of Amity and Commerce.

The Treaty of Tientsin specified how such jurisdiction was to be governed:

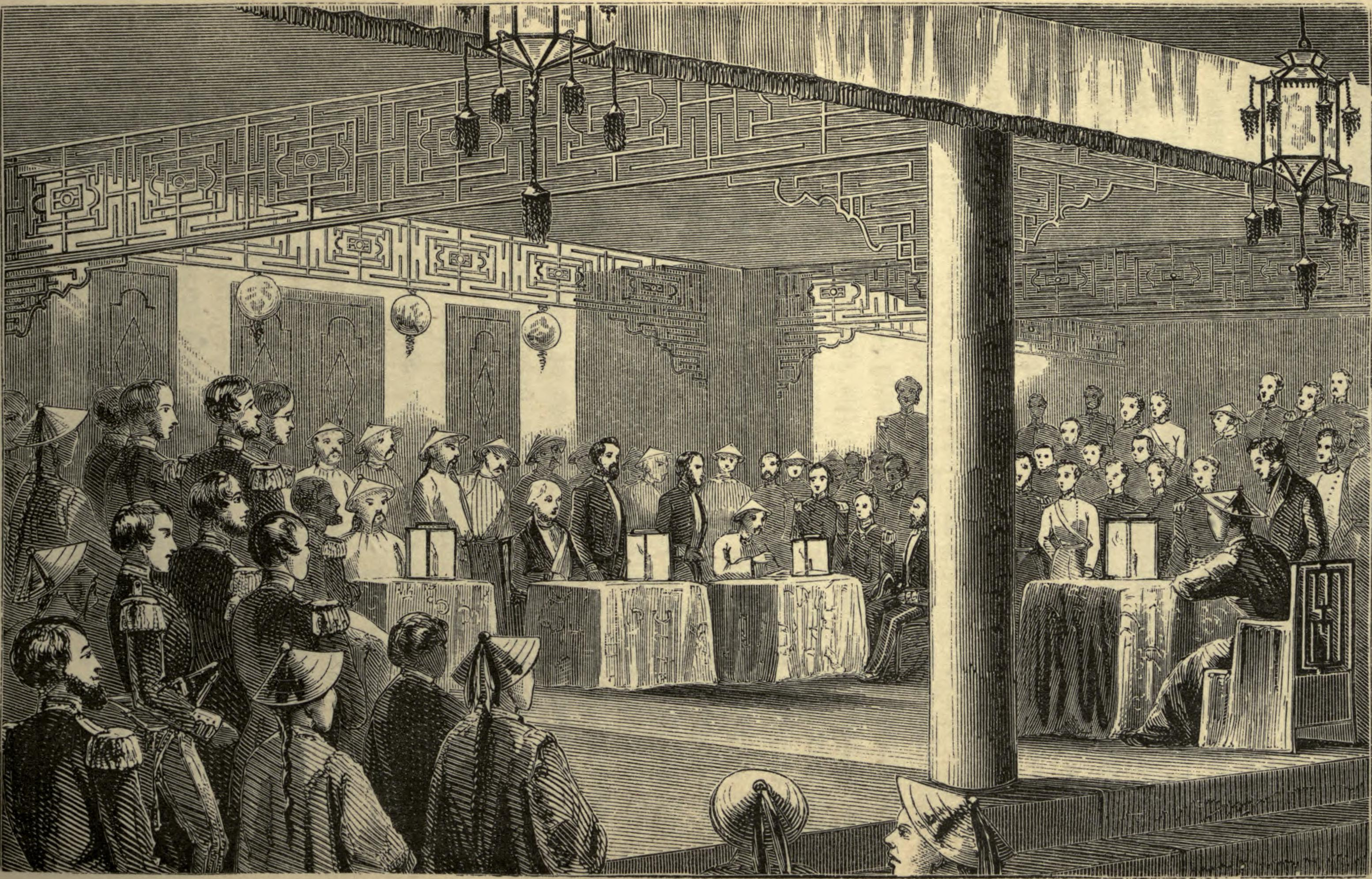
Signing of the Treaty of Tientsin

1. Disputes between British subjects would "be subject to the jurisdiction of the British authorities."
2. For criminal acts, Chinese subjects would be arrested and punished by the Chinese authorities, according to Chinese law. In similar fashion, British subjects tried and punished by the Consul, "or other public functionary authorized thereto", according to British law.
3. Where a British subject wished to lodge a complaint against a Chinese subject, or vice versa, it had to be presented to the British consul, who would "do his utmost to arrange it amicably." Failing that, "he shall request the assistance of the Chinese authorities, that they may together examine into the merits of the case, and decide it equitably."
4. In civil matters, Chinese authorities would enforce debts owed by Chinese subjects to British subjects, and British authorities would do likewise for those owed by British subjects to Chinese subjects.

Jurisdiction in the first instance, as well as in matters involving British defendants, was vested in the British consular courts, while in the Shanghai International Settlement, matters relating to criminal acts and debt enforcement involving Chinese defendants were vested in a "Mixed Court" (Chinese: 洋泾浜理事公廨; pinyin: Yángjīngbāng lishì gōngxiè, later known as 會審公廨; Huìshěn Gōngxiè). Matters relating to complaints were not considered to be judicial.

Appeals from British consular courts initially went to the Supreme Court of Hong Kong, which gradually became unpopular as British economic activity rose in the Yangtse valley. The establishment of the British Supreme Court for China and Japan (Note: formally "Her Britannic Majesty's Supreme Court for China and Japan") was not challenged from any official quarter in China, as it was seen to be not only a way to more efficiently try matters close to the scene, but also to allow Qing officials to exert direct pressure on British authorities when they were not satisfied with a sentence.

In 1879, reflecting the growing British commercial interests in Japan and the inconvenience of bringing a first instance action in Shanghai, the British Court for Japan was established in Kanagawa (now part of Yokohama) with first instance jurisdiction in Japan. The Court for Japan also heard appeals from consular courts in Japan. Appeals from the Court for Japan were heard by the Chief Justice and Judge of the Supreme Court in Shanghai.

The United Kingdom later obtained extraterritoriality in Korea as a result of the United Kingdom–Korea Treaty of 1883. The court's jurisdiction was subsequently extended there in 1884, but the court's name remained unchanged.

Under the terms of the Anglo-Japanese Treaty of Commerce and Navigation of 1894, Britain gave up extraterritorial rights in Japan with effect from July 1899. The court was renamed the British Supreme Court for China and Corea in 1900. (Note: formally "Her Britannic Majesty's Supreme Court for China and Corea" (1900-1901) and, later, "His Britannic Majesty's Supreme Court for China and Corea" (1901–1910)) The Court for Japan officially heard its last case, which had been filed before the end of July 1899, in early 1900.

Under the Japan-Korea Treaty of 1910, Korea was annexed by Japan and Britain automatically lost extraterritorial rights in Korea. The court was, in January 1911, renamed the "British Supreme Court for China".

In the 1920s there were negotiations with China to give up extraterritorial rights. In 1930 and 1931, after the Kuomintang consolidated their rule in China, Britain reached an agreement in principle with the Chinese Foreign Minister to give up extraterritorial rights. The Japanese invasion of Manchuria in 1931 and then Northern China in 1937 put the issue on the backburner. The court effectively ceased to function on 8 December 1941 when the Japanese Navy occupied the court premises at the start of the Pacific War. After nine months' internment, either at home or in the Cathay Hotel (now the Peace Hotel), the judges and British staff of the court were evacuated to Britain aboard the SS Narkunda.

It was, however, only in 1943 during World War II that Britain gave up extraterritorial rights in China under the British-Chinese Treaty for the Relinquishment of Extra-Territorial Rights in China signed on 11 January 1943 and which came into force on 20 May 1943. The United States gave up its extraterritorial rights at the same time. The court therefore had had jurisdiction over British subjects in Korea for 27 years; in Japan for 34 years and in China for 78 years when the court was finally dissolved in 1943.

== Court buildings ==
In Shanghai, the court was housed in the British Consulate compound. From 1865 to 1871 cases were heard using the rooms that had been used by the consular court. In 1871 a dedicated court building to stand at the back of the consulate building facing on to Yuanmingyuan Road was opened. In 1913 the building was expanded to add a police court (on the ground floor) and a second court (on the first floor) immediately south of the main court room. Rooms of similar size were built to the north for consular offices. The building still stands to this day and can be seen from Yuanmingyuan Road.

In Yokohama, the British Court for Japan sat in the British Consulate building. The building was destroyed in the 1923 Great Kantō earthquake.

In other cities, when the judges of the court went on circuit to outlying cities they would generally sit in courts in British consulate buildings but on occasions would use other premises where important cases of great public interest were being heard.

Today the court building is used as an entertainment and dining venue managed by The Peninsula Shanghai Hotel.

== Jurisdiction ==
The court applied the rules of English law and equity to matters in difference concerning:

- British subjects, or between foreigners and British subjects,
- the administration or control of the property or persons of British subjects,
- the repression or punishment of crimes or offences committed by British subjects, and
- the maintenance of order among British subjects.

By 1904, such jurisdiction had been expanded so that it covered:

- British subjects, including British protected persons, (Note: which was the subject of a 1914 appeal to the Judicial Committee of the Privy Council.)
- the property and all rights and liabilities of British subjects
- foreigners within prescribed circumstances
- foreigners of States which by treaty had consented to the exercise of British jurisdiction
- British ships, and all persons and property on board, within 100 nautical miles (185 km) of the coast

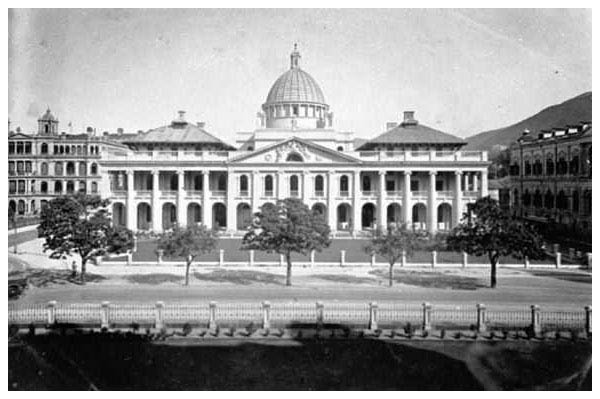
Hong Kong Supreme Court building, 1915

In China, the court deferred to the Hong Kong Supreme Court in several respects, relinquishing jurisdiction over cases involving British subjects where the matter in question occurred:

- within 10 miles (16 km) of Hong Kong's borders,
- in Weihaiwei between 1902 and 1930,

or where an offence was committed on a British ship by a British subject in Hong Kong

The court could also decide to refer certain criminal cases involving British subjects to the Hong Kong Court, or to the Sessions Court at Mandalay. Referred cases were tried under English law, instead of Hong Kong law or Indian law.

In 1916, the companies ordinances enacted in Hong Kong were extended to China, and companies that were constituted as a "China Company" thereunder were placed under the jurisdiction of the Court.

In 1920, that part of China that formed part of the British consular district of Kashgar was withdrawn from the Supreme Court's jurisdiction. From that time onwards to 1943, extraterritorial jurisdiction in that region was exercised by the High Court of the Punjab (Lahore High Court), and Indian law applied.

Effective 26 April 1927, the court ceased to have criminal jurisdiction over persons subject to military law in the British and Indian military forces, while on active service, except if the commander of the forces consented to the court having jurisdiction.

== Cases ==
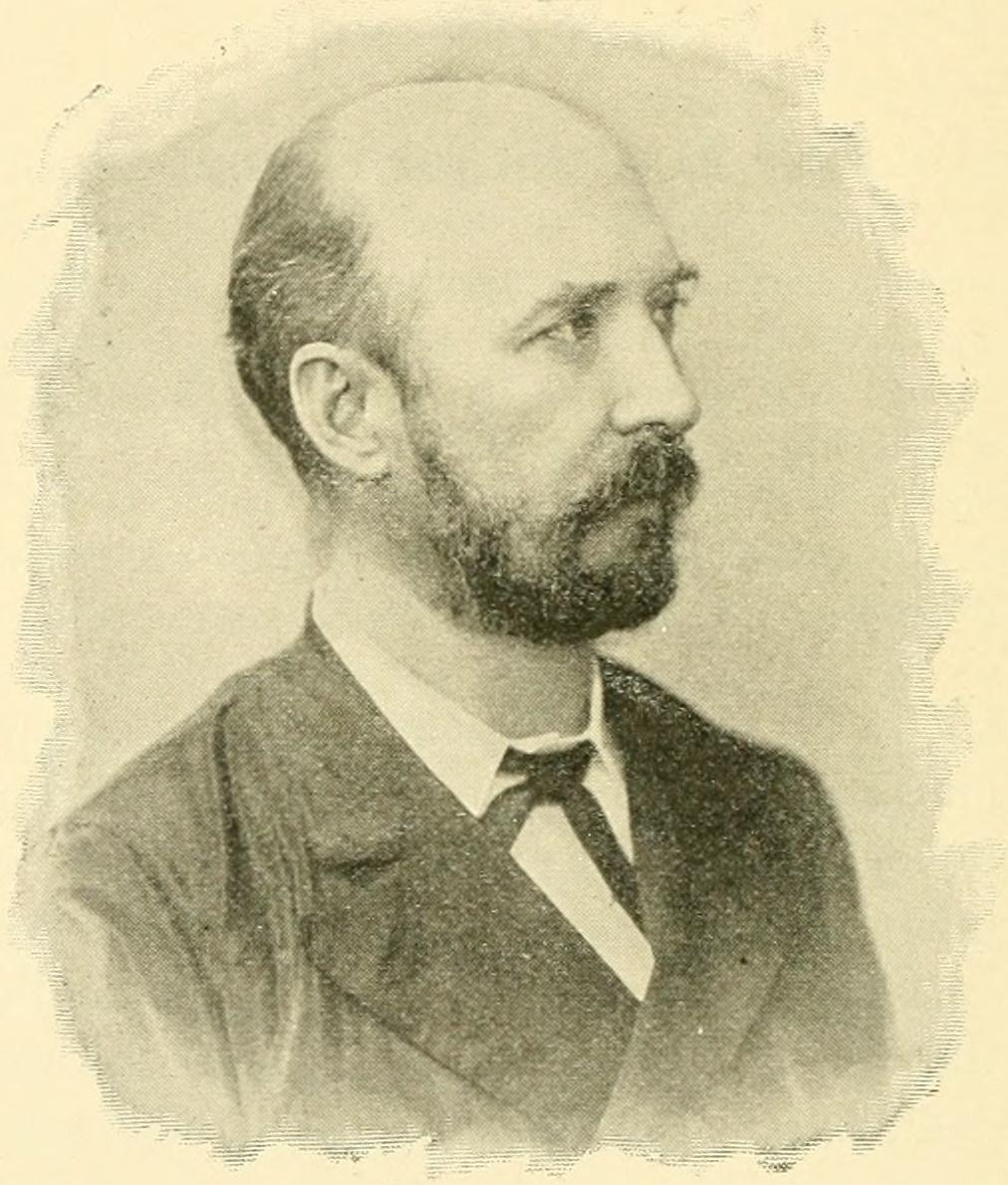
Robert Hart, Defendant in von Gumpach v Hart

The court tried cases of all descriptions, all the time applying English law in China, Japan and Korea, including murder trials before juries, divorce cases, commercial disputes, trademark and passing off claims, habeas corpus applications and cases of petty theft. Some of its cases have been posted online by Macquarie University. Official case reports can be found in the North China Herald which was also the Supreme Court and Consular Gazette. Cases from other consular courts in Shanghai were also published in the North China Herald.

Some famous cases included:

- a defamation claim brought by Baron von Gumpach against Robert Hart, the Chief Inspector of Chinese Maritime Customs, which ultimately went to the Judicial Committee of the Privy Council;
- the trial in 1908 of Ernest Bethell, proprietor of the Korean Daily News for sedition against the Japanese Government of Korea as well as a defamation claim brought by Bethell, also in 1908, against the North China Herald;
- a habeas corpus application, in 1939, on behalf of 4 Chinese held by British officials in Tianjin but wanted by the Japanese authorities in China for murder; and
- the trial, in 1897, in the British Court for Japan of Edith Carew for the arsenic poisoning of her husband in Yokohama.

== Judges of the court ==
In its 78 years of existence from 1865 to 1943 the court had 15 full-time judges, including the first Chief Judge, Sir Edmund Hornby, Egyptologist Charles Wycliffe Goodwin; Frederick Bourne, a recipient of thanks from the U.S. president for services rendered; an aristocrat, Havilland de Sausmarez for whom the baronetage of the De Sausmarez Baronets was created; and a recipient of a decoration from the King of Siam, Skinner Turner. The judges came from a variety of places, including from England, Wales, Scotland, Ireland, the British Virgin Islands and South Africa.

Throughout its existence the court had two permanent judges at any one time. From 1865 to 1878 and 1905 to 1943 the senior judge was titled Judge and the junior judge's title was Assistant Judge. Between 1878 and 1905 the senior judge was titled Chief Justice and the junior judge's title was Judge.

List of judges
Person	Asst Judge	Judge	Chief Justice	Judge for Japan	Other role
Sir Edmund Grimani Hornby		1865–1876			
Charles Wycliffe Goodwin	1865–1878				Based in Yokohama, Japan from 1874 to 1877; Acting Chief Judge 1877
George French		1877	1878-1881		
Robert Anderson Mowat		1878–1891		1891-–1897	
Sir Richard Temple Rennie			1881–1891	1879–1881	
Sir Nicholas John Hannen			1891–1900	1881–1891	Acting Assistant Judge, Yokohama, 1871–1874; Crown Advocate 1878–1881; Concurrently, Consul General, Shanghai (1891–1897)
George Jamieson, CMG		1891–1897			Acting Judge for Japan 1888–1889; Concurrently Consul, Shanghai (1891–1897)
Sir Frederick Samuel Augustus Bourne, CMG	1901–1916	1898–1901			Judge of the High Court of Weihaiwei (1903–1916)
Sir Hiram Shaw Wilkinson			1900-1905	1897-1900	Crown Advocate 1881–1897
Sir Havilland de Sausmarez		1905–1921			President of the full court of the Supreme Court of Hong Kong (1910–1920)
Sir Skinner Turner	1916–1921	1921–1927			
Sir Peter Grain	1921–1927	1927–1933			Judge of the High Court of Weihaiwei (1925–1930)
Gilbert Walter King, OBE	1927–1931				Registrar of the Court, 1908–1927.
Penrhyn Grant Jones, CBE	1931–1943				
Sir Allan George Mossop		1933–1943			Crown Advocate, 1925–1933

== Crown advocates ==
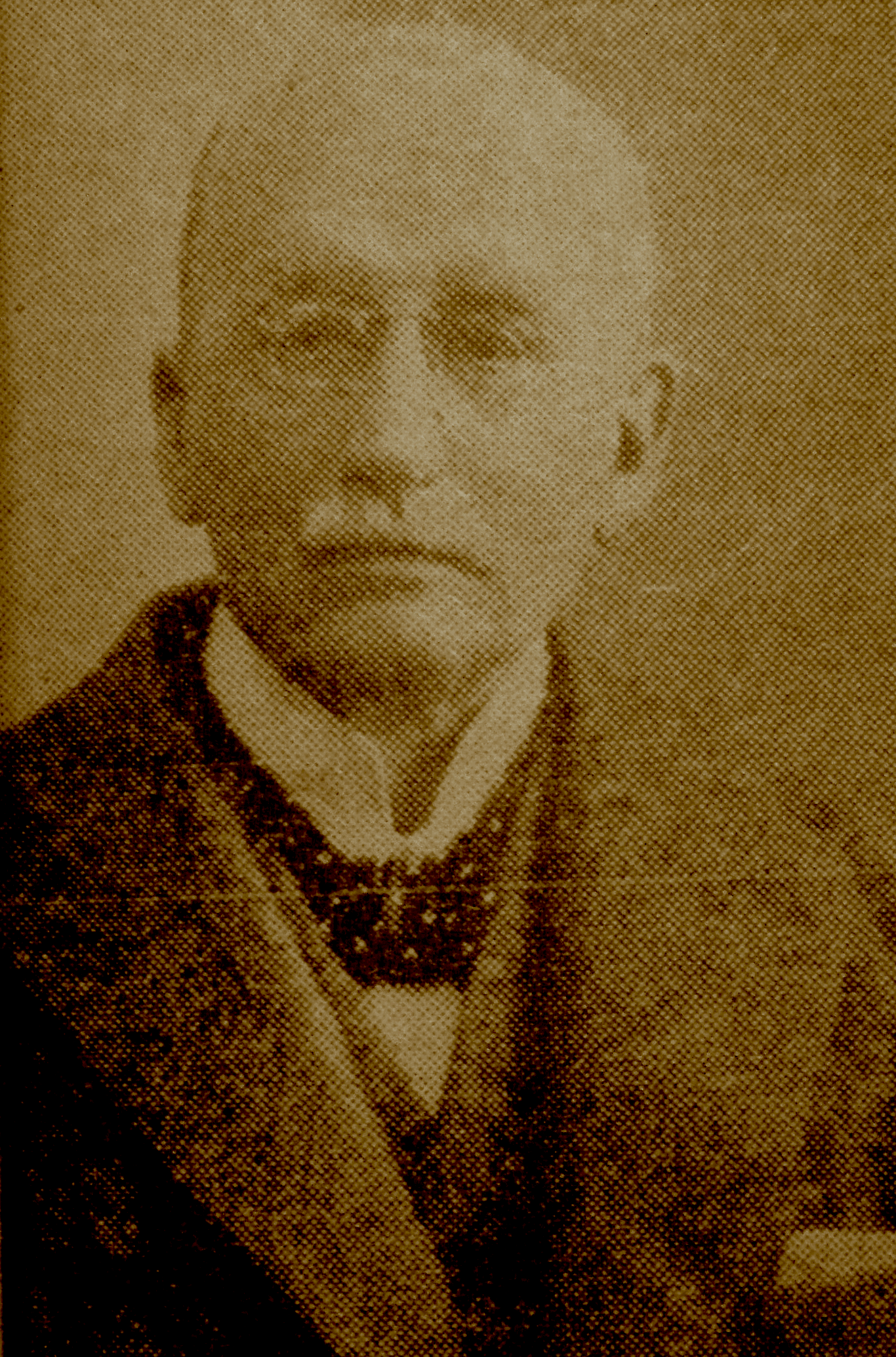
Hiram Parkes Wilkinson, longest serving Crown Advocate

In 1878, the position of Crown Advocate was created, being similar to the position of an Attorney General in a colony. The Crown Advocate was not a full-time position in the Foreign Office, but the officeholder received payment for performing his duties. He was allowed to accept cases from private clients that did not conflict with his public role. The six gentlemen who served in this office were:

1. Nicholas John Hannen (1878–1881)
2. Hiram Shaw Wilkinson (1882–1897)
3. Hiram Parkes Wilkinson (1897–1925) (also Judge of the British High Court of Weihaiwei, 1916–1925)
4. Allan George Mossop (1925–1933)
5. Victor Priestwood (1934–1939)
6. John McNeill (1939–1942)

Hiram Parkes Wilkinson was the son of Hiram Shaw Wilkinson. Together they served as Crown Advocate for a total of 44 years.

== See also ==
- Former Consulate-General of the United Kingdom, Shanghai
- List of consuls-general of the United Kingdom in Shanghai
- Shanghai International Settlement
- United States Court for China
