= Consular court =

Consular courts were law courts established by foreign powers in countries where they had extraterritorial rights. They were presided over by consular officers.

== Extraterritoriality ==
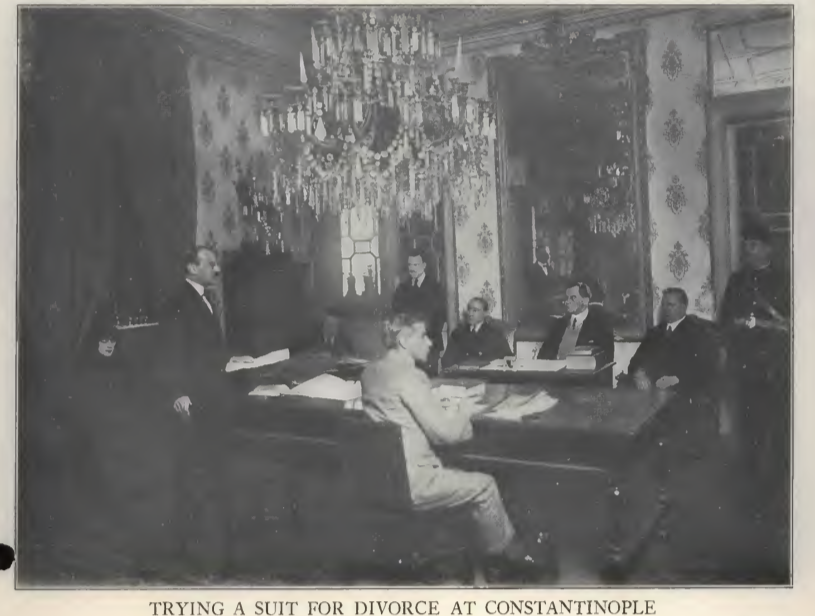
Trying a divorce suit in the United States Consular Court at Constantinople, 1922

Western powers when establishing diplomatic relations with countries they considered to have underdeveloped legal systems would demand extraterritorial rights. Treaty provisions provided that the laws of the local country did not apply to citizens of the treaty powers and that local courts did not have jurisdiction over them. Consular courts were established to handle civil and criminal cases against citizens and subjects of the subjects of the country. The British had the widest system of consular courts run by the Foreign Office. British consular courts could be found in Africa, the Ottoman Empire, Egypt, China, Japan, Korea and Siam.

== China and Japan ==
In China and Japan under the "unequal treaties" signed in the mid-19th century many countries established consular courts in cities open to foreign trade (called treaty ports).

Britain established a fully fledged court system in China and Japan. In 1865, the British Supreme Court for China and Japan was established in Shanghai, China as a first instance consular court for cases in the Shanghai region as well as an appellate court for cases heard by consular courts in the rest of China, Japan and, from the 1880s Korea. In 1879, a British Court for Japan was established in Yokohama, replacing the local consular court in the hearing of first instance cases for Yokohama region, and acting as an appellate court for cases from consular courts in other Japanese cities.

In Japan extraterritoriality came to an end on 4 August 1899, with the British Court for Japan and other consular courts closing after finalising their pending cases. The British Court for Japan heard its final case in January of 1900.

There was a right of appeal to the Judicial Committee of the Privy Council in London from the British consular courts.

In 1906, the United States established the United States Court for China modelled on the British Supreme Court for China and Japan.

In China, consular courts operated up until the 1940s when extraterritoriality for most nations came to an end.
