= Saumarez =

Saumarez or Sausmarez (pronounced "Sommeray") may refer to:

== People ==
- Annie, Lady de Sausmarez (1856–1947), British philanthropist
- Eric Saumarez, 7th Baron de Saumarez (born 1956), British hereditary peer
- Havilland de Sausmarez (1861–1941), British judge
- James Saumarez, 1st Baron de Saumarez (1757–1836), Royal Navy admiral
- James Saumarez, 4th Baron de Saumarez (1843–1937), British diplomat
- Philip Saumarez (1710–1747), British naval captain
- Richard Saumarez (1764–1835), British surgeon and medical author
- Thomas Saumarez (1760–1845), British Army general
- Thomas Saumarez (Royal Navy officer) (1827–1903), British naval captain

== Places ==
- Saumarez Homestead, New South Wales, Australia
- Saumarez Island, Patagonian Archipelago, Chile
- Sausmarez Manor, a historic house on the island of Guernsey
- Saumarez Parish, New Brunswick, Canada
- Saumarez Park, a public park on the island of Guernsey

== Others ==
- HMS Saumarez, several ships of the Royal Navy
- Saumarez (horse), a Thoroughbred racehorse

== See also ==
- Saumarez Smith (disambiguation)
