= Arnhold =

Arnhold may refer to:

- Arnhold (surname), a surname
- Arnhold Holdings Ltd., a Hong Kong company
- Arnhold Rivas (born 1989), Mexican footballer

== See also ==
- Arnold (disambiguation)
