= Number 64-class cruiser =

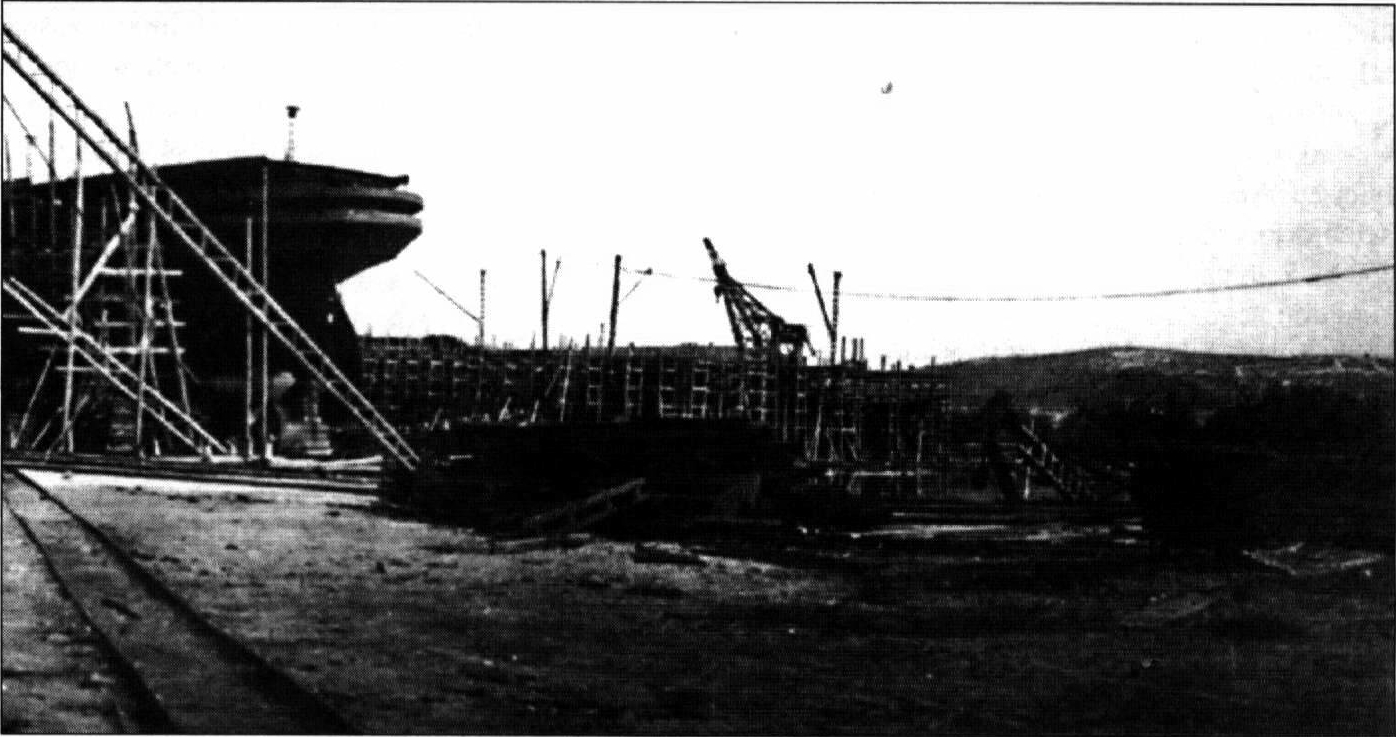
- An incomplete Number 64-class cruiser in drydock. 1915

Class overview
- Name: Number 64 class
- Builders: Cantiere Navale Triestino, Monfalcone, Austria-Hungary
- Operators: Republic of China Navy (1913-1914)
- Preceded by: Zhào Hé class
- Succeeded by: Number 68 (Planned); Ning Hai class (Actual)
- Cost: £400,000
- Built: 1914–1915
- Planned: 3
- Completed: 0
- Canceled: 3

General characteristics
- Type: Protected cruiser
- Displacement: 1,800 tons
- Length: 106 m (347 ft 9 in) o/a
- Beam: 10.9 m (35 ft 9 in)
- Draught: 4 m (13 ft 1 in)
- Propulsion: 2 shafts, 2 AEG steam turbines engines, 4 Yarrow boilers, 12,500 bhp (9,300 kW)
- Speed: 24.5 knots (28.2 mph; 45.4 km/h)
- Armament: 4 × Škoda 120-millimetre (4.7 in)/50 (2 × 2); 8 × 66 mm (3 in)/50 (8 × 1); 4 × 47 mm (2 in)/44 (4 × 1); 2 × 450 mm (18 in) torpedo tubes (2 × 1)
- Armour: Deck: 20–25 mm (1–1 in); Conning tower: 60 mm (2 in); Turrets: Unknown

The Number 64 class (Chinese: 六十四號; pinyin: Liùshísì Hào), also known as the Monfalcone light cruisers or Monfalcone type light cruisers, was a planned class of protected cruisers ordered for the Republic of China Navy. None were completed due to the start of World War I and were eventually scrapped. The ships were not given names, being known only by their yard construction numbers, 64–66.

== Background ==
After the Xinhai Revolution of 1911, Anti-Qing forces overthrew the Manchu Qing dynasty which had ruled China for 268 years. in its place, a new Republic of China was established and the Xuantong Emperor was replaced by a new western-style republic under the presidency of general Yuan Shikai. During this time of sweeping changes to the government in China, the Qing government had just ordered three protected cruisers, ordered for the Imperial Chinese Navy, from three different foreign dockyards that were nearing completion. These ships were; the Zhào Hé, built by Armstrong Whitworth in Elswick, which had only just completed sea trials nine days before the revolution. The Yīng Ruì, built by Vickers Limited in Barrow-in-Furness which was still in the United Kingdom, on the River Clyde at the time of the revolution. Lastly there was the Fēi Hóng, which was being built by New York Shipbuilding Corporation in Camden, New Jersey, and had not even been launched by the time the Qing government was overthrown. Through a lengthy and expensive negotiation process, the new Chinese government were able to re-negotiate terms for the Zhào Hé and the Yīng Ruì but were unable to come to an agreement on the fate of the Fēi Hóng. Eventually in 1914, a deal was struck with Bethlehem Steel and the Fēi Hóng was instead sold to the Kingdom of Greece as the Elli with the promise to order the original amount owed for the warship in future orders of non-military ships.

With the matter of the three training cruisers being settled there fact remained that the fledgling Republic of China Navy was still critically weak, with many of her warships aging and in disrepair. In order to remedy this, the new Navy Minister of the Republic of China, Liu Guanxiong, began negotiations for an ambitious expansion of their navy. The Navy Minister approached several European banks for a loan for the construction of six destroyers from AG Vulcan Stettin in Germany and twelve small destroyers from Stabilimento Tecnico Triestino (STT) in Austria-Hungary. Arnhold, Karberg & Co. of Berlin stepped forward with the winning submission with a £3,200,000 offer (at 6% interest to be paid in four years). Arnhold, Karberg & Co. also represented Austria-Hungary's largest arms manufacturer, Škoda Works, of Plzeň whose loan of £500,000 was also part of the larger consolidated loan. Liu soon amended the order in June 1913. Hoping to use the remaining money from the loan, the Navy Minister requested three additional 4,900 ton light cruiser, armed with four 203-millimetre (8.0 in) guns. Both Vulcan and STT were not interested in fulfilling an additional order of cruisers on top of their existing orders for destroyers which had both been signed for, on 10 April 1913. Eager not to lose such a large contract, Škoda turned to the new shipyard in Monfalcone, Cantiere Navale Triestino (CNT), to fulfil the order. Škoda ensured this by becoming the majority shareholder in CNT. On 27 June 1913, CNT informed Škoda that the first part of the loan (£870,000) would not be enough to build the 18 destroyers and the added three large cruisers. Instead for the same price of one large cruiser, three smaller 1800 ton cruisers could be built in two years. The Chinese insisted on the larger, original cruiser design, but after cost overruns in the naval artillery from Škoda for the ships, Liu relented. The new Chinese government signed four contracts in total from several European shipyards in 1913. The third, which was signed in September 1913, was for the three small protected cruisers of 1800 tons from CNT at a total cost of £1,200,000. The cruisers were expected to be launched in 1915 and completed by 1916.

The fourth contract, was made possible by a second loan of £200,000, also from Arnhold, Karberg & Co. This order was made on 20 October 1913 for a single larger, modern 4800 ton light cruiser from CNT and given the construction number Number 68 as well as thirty six field guns and seventy two mountain guns from Škoda. Of the twenty-two warships ordered by China in 1913, not a single ship would enter Chinese service. The outbreak of First World War, lead to the seizure of all her ships being built in Europe which was a major blow to Chinese attempts to strengthen her navy. The three aforementioned cruisers never received names and so were referred to by their construction numbers which was 64, 65 and 66. The three small cruisers were planned to replace three German built Hǎi Róng-class cruisers, acquired at the turn of the century. Number 65 was laid down first, on 2 April 1914, followed shortly after by Number 64 on 15 April, and then lastly Number 66, on 30 May 1914. The CNT shipyards laid almost directly on the Austria-Hungarian front lines when the Kingdom of Italy declared war on Austria-Hungary on 23 May 1915. Austria-Hungarian forces began evacuating Monfalcone, abandoning the four incomplete Chinese cruisers as it was felt they were not sufficiently advanced in their construction to be worth moving. Shortly after, on 9 June 1915, the shipyard, and the Chinese cruisers, were captured by forces of the Royal Italian Army (cruiser Number 65 was due to be launched that month). The Italians destroyed and removed much of the equipment and machinery at CNT but left the unfinished cruisers nearly untouched. On 27 October 1917, the Austro-Hungarian Army recaptured Monfalcone from Italy after a crushing victory at the Battle of Caporetto. There the Austrians found all four cruisers still in their drydocks and in good shape. It was decided that Cruiser Number 68 would be requisitioned and completed by the Austro-Hungarian Navy while the three smaller cruisers would remain uncompleted.

After the war ended on 11 September 1918, with the signing of the Treaty of Versailles, Škoda, now in the new nation of Czechoslovakia, and still the legal ownership of the shipyard and ships, approached the Chinese government, with an offer to complete the cruisers left in Monfalcone. Negotiations lasted from 1919 to 1920 but the Chinese government, which was now facing serious financial issues, declined the offer. The cruisers Number 64-66 were scrapped by CNT between February and March 1921.

== Design ==
The 1800 ton cruiser were small, lightweight warships built on Austria-Hungary's experience with the Novara class scout cruisers, with an overall length of little more than 100 m (328 ft 1 in). This was similar to contemporary European second-rate cruisers, although much lighter in displacement. While technically an outdated, protected cruiser design, the Number 64-class incorporated several new innovations found in newer light cruiser designs such as its engine and armament. Older source material on the Number 64-class specifications, such as those listed by Conway Publishings Conway's All the World's Fighting Ships 1906–1921, give the dimensions of the Number 64s as a length of 105 m (344 ft 6 in), a beam of 10.9 m (35 ft 9 in), and a draught of 4 m (13 ft 1 in). The armament as ten single mounted Škoda 10 cm K10 guns, four license-built 47 mm (2 in) guns and two, single 450 mm (18 in) torpedo tubes. The ship protection was unknown. In contrast, newer research on the Monfalcone cruisers by military historian René Greger, casts doubt on the accuracy of earlier literature with the finding of original drawings and documentation on the development of the Number 64-class cruisers.

The order for three protected cruisers was approved by the Chinese government on 26 August 1913. The original Škoda designed called for an 1800-ton, oil-firing ship with an overall length of 106 m (347 ft 9 in). The ships primary armament were to be four, twin-mounted Škoda 15 cm K10 gun guns in fully enclosed gun turrets. A secondary armament of eight Škoda 7 cm K10 guns, a tertiary armament of four license-built QF 3-pounder Hotchkiss, and two single tube 450 mm (18 in) were also specified. The ships were to be powered by two modern AEG steam turbines, a significant advancement over older vertical triple expansion engines. The Chinese, soon became concerned with the strength of the hull of such small cruisers. On 28 January 1914, the ship designs width and engines were modified to address these concerns, the beam was finalized at 10.9 m (35 ft 9 in) and the draught at 4 m (13 ft 1 in). A funnel was also eliminated bringing the total number down to two and the engines were changed from solely oil-firing to coal and oil-firing. Protection was provided by a 20–25 mm (1–1 in) thick armour deck, while the conning tower was protected by 60 mm (2 in). The thickness of the new armoured gun turrets were not known. Although provisionally approved for construction by April 1914, concerns over the strength of the main armament being too large for such small ships persisted. Although as late as June 1914 Škoda insisted that the ships were strong enough to be armed with 15 cm guns, (including the suggestion of strengthening and reinforcing the hull by 50 tons) eventually Škoda yielded to Chinese concerns. The order was amended for four newly developed, twin-mounted Škoda 120-millimetre (4.7 in)/50 guns in two turrets and the finalized design was accepted by the Chinese 24 July 1914.

== Ships ==
| Name | Builder | Laid | Launched | Completed | Fate |
|---|---|---|---|---|---|
| Number 64 (六十四號) | Cantiere Navale Triestino | 15 April 1914 | September 1915 (planned) | August 1916 (planned) | Construction halted 9 June 1915 when 13% complete Broken up in place |
| Number 65 (六十五號) | Cantiere Navale Triestino | 2 April 1914 | July 1915 (cancelled) | April 1916 (planned) | Construction halted 9 June 1915 when 17% complete Broken up in place |
| Number 66 (六十六號) | Cantiere Navale Triestino | 30 May 1914 | April 1916 (planned) | September 1916 (planned) | Construction halted 9 June 1915 when 12% complete Broken up in place |

== See also ==
- Ersatz Zenta-class cruiser - World War I Austro-Hungarian cruiser design series, never built
- La Motte-Picquet-class cruiser - World War I French cruiser design series, never built
- German FK cruiser designs - World War I German cruiser design series, never built
