= Skinner Turner =

British judge (1868-1935)

Sir Skinner Turner
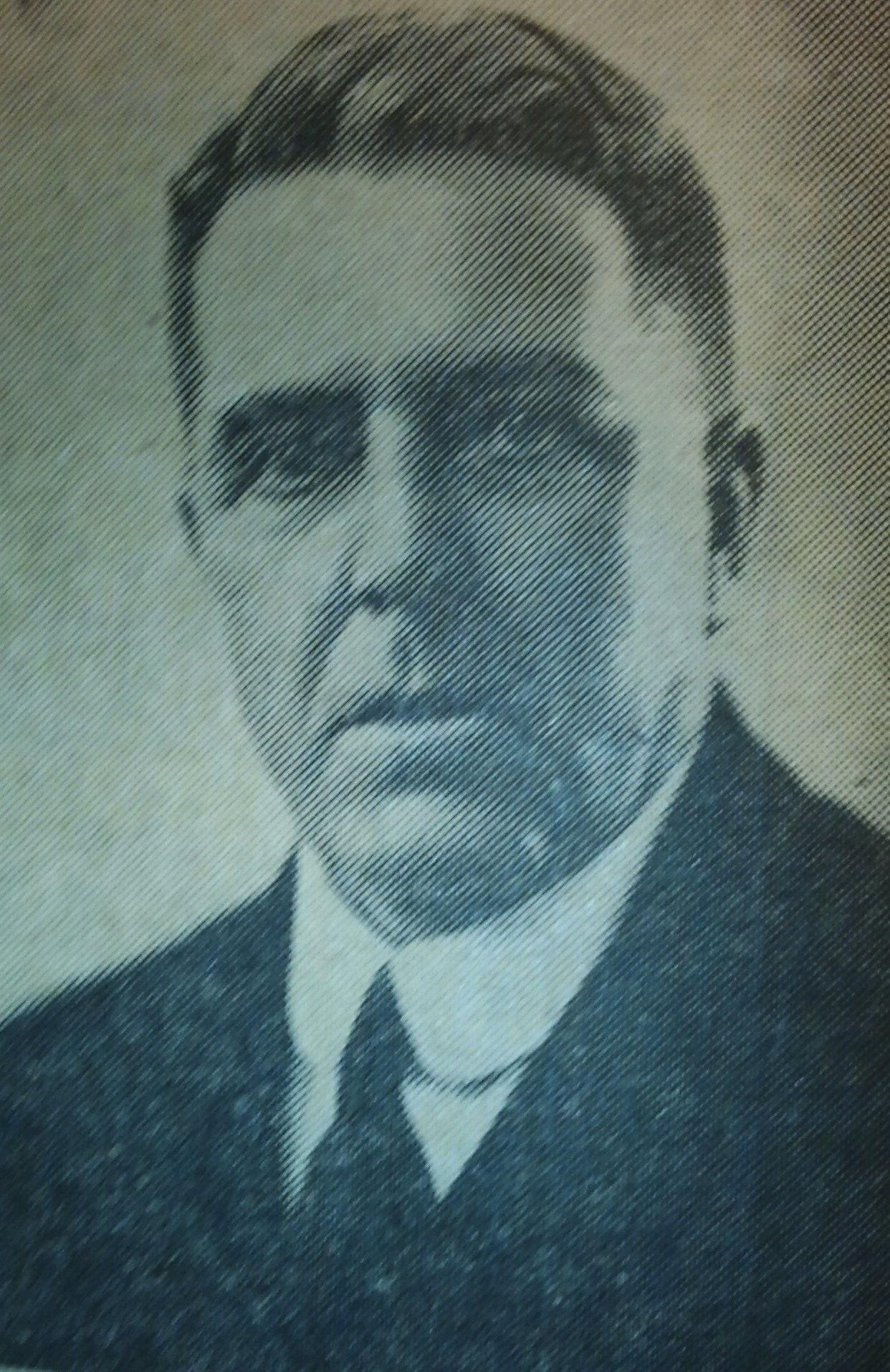

Judge, British Court for Siam
- In office 1905–1909

Assistant Judge, British Supreme Court for China
- In office 1916–1921
- Preceded by: Frederick Samuel Augustus Bourne
- Succeeded by: Peter Grain

Chief Judge, British Supreme Court for China
- In office 1921–1927
- Preceded by: Havilland de Sausmarez
- Succeeded by: Peter Grain

Personal details
- Born: 2 June 1868 Tonbridge, Kent, England
- Died: 5 July 1935 (aged 67) Winchester, Hampshire, England
- Spouse: Millicent Harriet Hewitt (m. 1902)
- Relatives: Michael Turner (son)
- Education: King's College School
- Alma mater: London University

Sir Skinner Turner (2 June 1868 – 5 July 1935) was a British judge who served in Kenya, Uganda, Siam and China. His last position was as the Chief Judge of the British Supreme Court for China from 1921 to 1927.

== Early life ==
Turner was born near Tonbridge, Kent, England in on June 2, 1868 to Frederick and Marsha Turner, the eighth of nine children. In the 1871 census, his father described his profession as “farmer of 560 acres employing 20 men and 2 boys.”

== Education ==
Turner was educated at King's College School, Strand, and at London University. Turner was called to the Bar at the Middle Temple in 1890.

== Career ==
Turner started his career in law on the Western Circuit and at the Hampshire Sessions.

=== Judicial ===
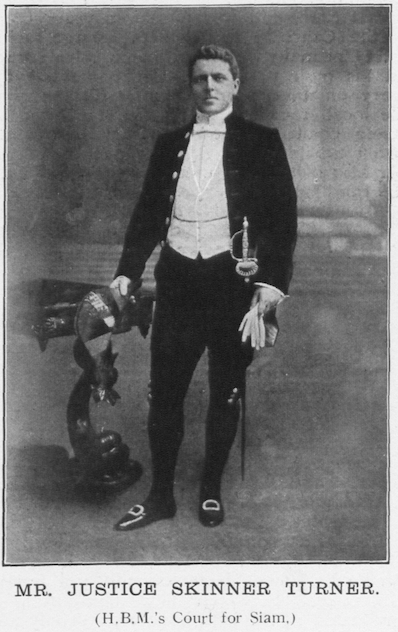

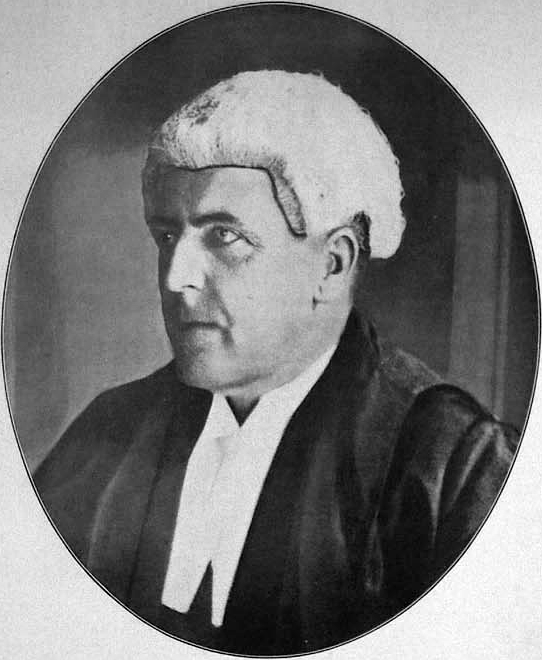
Turner in judicial wig, 1924

Turner joined the Foreign Office Judicial Service in 1900. He was appointed Registrar to the British Court of the East Africa Protectorate. The following year he was transferred to the Uganda Protectorate to act as Vice-Consul. Early in 1902 he was appointed magistrate in Mombasa and in May the same year was transferred to Zanzibar as acting Assistant Judge. He was appointed Second Assistant Judge in October 1902 and promoted to Senior Assistant Judge in February 1904. Throughout his time in Zanzibar he sat as one of the judges of the Court of Appeal for the East Africa Protectorates and was present at the first sitting of that court.

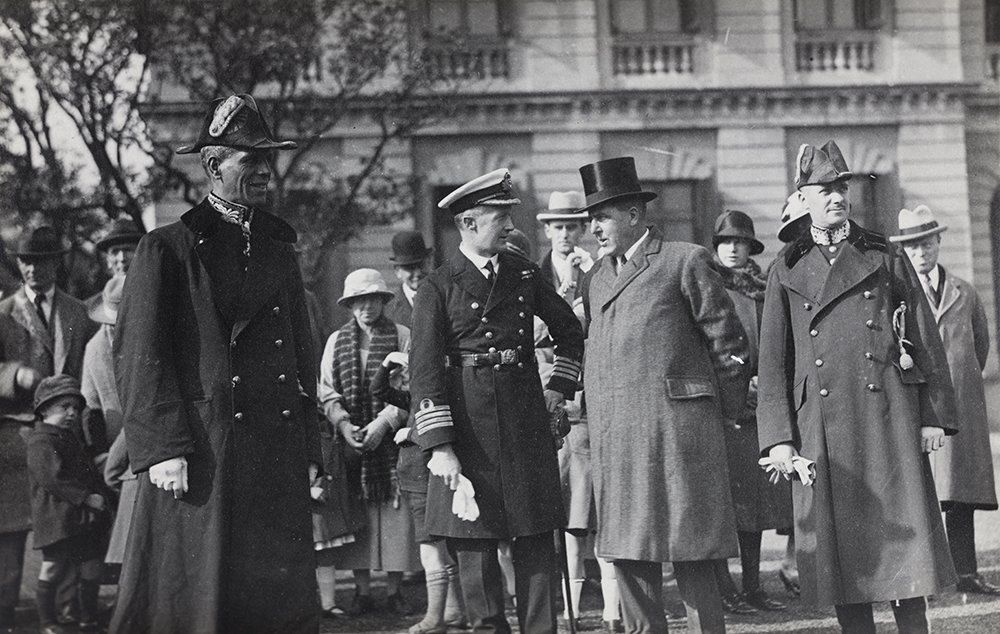
Turner (second from right) at Armistice Day parade in Shanghai, 1924

In 1905, he was appointed Judge of the British Court for Siam, replacing acting judge Hiram Parkes Wilkinson. In 1909, on conclusion of the treaty partially bringing extraterritoriality to an end between Siam and Great Britain, he was lent to the Siamese Government as legal adviser. In this role, he sat on the Siamese Court of Appeal. In recognition of his valuable services as judicial adviser, he was awarded the Insignia of the Third Class of the Ratanabhon Personal Order by the King of Siam.

In 1915, Turner was appointed Assistant Judge of the British Supreme Court for China in Shanghai on the retirement of Sir Frederick Bourne. In 1921, he was promoted to Chief Judge. In 1926 he served as the British Representative on the Extraterritoriality Commission that had been set up to investigate the application of extraterritoriality in China with the view to its eventual abolition.

Turner retired in 1927 and was succeeded by Peter Grain.

== Personal life ==
Turner married in The Lady Chapel of Winchester Cathedral on 2 October 1902 Millicent Harriet Hewitt, daughter of Rev. W. H. Hewett.

Turner died eight years after his retirement, on 5 July 1935, at a nursing home in Winchester at the age of 67.
