= Chinese cruiser Number 68 =

Chinese Navy warship

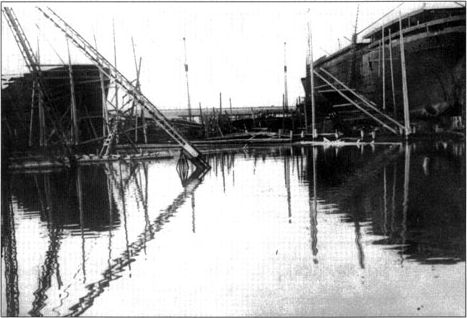
- The Monfalcone heavy cruiser (left) in drydock in Construction Yard No. 68. 1915.

History

Republic of China
- Name: Number 68/Liùshíbā Hào
- Builder: Cantiere Navale Triestino, Monfalcone, Austria-Hungary
- Cost: £880,000
- Yard number: 68
- Laid down: 15 April 1915
- Fate: Requisitioned October 1917 by Austria-Hungary

Austria-Hungary
- Name: Number 68/Nummer 68
- Acquired: October 1917
- Fate: Incomplete, scrapped in 1922

General characteristics (as planned)
- Type: armoured cruiser
- Displacement: 4,800 t (4,724 long tons)
- Length: 136.5 m (448 ft)
- Beam: 14.65 m (48.1 ft)
- Draught: 4.88 m (16.0 ft)
- Propulsion: 2-shaft, 2 Parson steam turbines; 16 dual coal/oil fired Yarrow boilers; 30,000 shp (22,000 kW)
- Speed: 28 knots (32 mph; 52 km/h)
- Range: 3,000 nautical miles (5,560 km) at 13 knots (24 km/h)
- Armament: As Planned; 4 Škoda 203mm/50 K16 guns (2 × 2); 12 Škoda 120-millimetre (4.7 in)/50 (12 × 1); 2 450 mm Schwartzkopff torpedo tubes (2 × 1)
- Armour: main belt: 60 to 100 mm (2.4 to 3.9 in); main deck: 25 to 65 mm (0.98 to 2.56 in); turrets: 100 mm (3.9 in); control tower: 100 mm (3.9 in)

Number 68 (Chinese: 六十八號; pinyin: Liùshíbā Hào), also known as the Monfalcone large cruiser, was a planned, unique, armored cruiser ordered for the Republic of China Navy. The ship was never completed due to the start of World War I and was eventually scrapped. The ship was not given a name, being known only the yard construction number, 68.

== Background ==
In 1911, the fledgling Provisional Government of the Republic of China had inherited a small, obsolete navy from the former Qing Dynasty. The Qing Imperial Chinese Navy had been in the midst of a naval rearmament, dubbed the "New Fleet Programme" since 1910 until the Xinhai Revolution overthrew 268 year old Manchu rule. The new Yuan Shikai-led government quickly embarked on acquiring a loan of $125 million from the six great powers to stabilize the shaky economy and to rearm the Republic of China Navy. While funding for the already under construction Chang Feng-class destroyers and two of the three Chao Ho-class cruisers was tentatively secured by 1913, several ships under construction which had been ordered under the previous Qing government were sold off. These ships were light cruiser Fei Hung(Chinese: 飛鴻; pinyin: Féi Hóng; lit. 'Flying Swan') which was sold to the Kingdom of Greece, and the destroyers Lung Tuan (Chinese: 龙湍; pinyin: Lóng Tuān; lit. 'Dragon Rapids') and Ching Po (Chinese: 鲸波; pinyin: Jīng Bō; lit. 'Whale Wave') were sold to Austria-Hungary and the Kingdom of Italy respectively.

Immediately after signing the agreement though, the Chinese Navy, under Minister of the Navy, Liu Guanxiong, became convinced that cruisers would be better to acquire rather than destroyers and on June 13, submitted a request for three 4,900 long tons (4,979 t) ton cruisers armed with four 203 mm (8 in) guns each. AG Vulcan immediately backed out of the deal as it was uninterested in building cruisers, while STT was uninterested in building the small destroyers. In order to salvage such a large deal, Škoda became a majority shareholder of the new Cantiere Navale Triestino (CNT) shipbuilding company in Monfalcone to fulfill the order. On June 27, 1913, the director general of Škoda informed the Chinese Beiyang government that the first loan was reduced to £870,000, which would only be enough to build one large cruiser rather than three. Škoda recommended that instead, for the same amount of money, CNT could build three, small 1,800 long tons (1,829 t) cruisers. While initially this was rejected by the Chinese Navy, after additional funds were clawed back from renegotiating the £2,000,000 loan for artillery became available. On August 26, 1913, an agreement on the terms of the first loan was made, for three 1,800 long tons (1,829 t) ton cruisers which would become the Number 64-class cruisers. The agreement on the second loan was made on October 20, 1913, for thirty six field guns and seventy two mountain guns from Skoda, and one 4,800 ton cruiser built to a revised September 1913 specification.

== Construction & Design ==
The Number 68 cruiser was a unique ship in terms of layout with a mix of older, conservative and newer, advanced design elements. Modern Parson steam turbines were chosen over older reciprocating steam engines, but retained a pre-dreadnought style mixed battery, with a heavy Secondary armament. In older source material such as Conway Publishings Conway's All the World's Fighting Ships 1906–1921 the specifications of the Number 68 was listed with a length of 137 m (449 ft 6 in), a beam of 14.7 m (48 ft 3 in), and a draught of 4.9 m (16 ft 1 in). The armament was given as four twin mounted 203 mm (8 in)/L50 guns, twelve single 120 mm (5 in)/45 guns, ten single 10 47 mm (1.9 in)/50 AA guns, four single 37 mm (1.5 in)/42 anti-aircraft guns, sixteen single 13.2 mm (0.52 in)/42 machine guns, eight single 7.9 mm (0.31 in)/80 machine guns and two, single 450 mm (18 in) torpedo tubes. The ship was protected by a 60 to 100 mm (2.4 to 3.9 in) armour belt, a main deck of 25 to 63 mm (0.98 to 2.48 in), and 100 mm (3.9 in) turrets and control tower. The Engine output in Conway's is given as 37,000 shp (28,000 kW).

== See also ==
- Number 64-class cruiser - World War I Chinese cruisers that were not completed by the end of the war
- Ersatz Zenta-class cruiser - World War I Austro-Hungarian cruiser design series, never built
- La Motte-Picquet-class cruiser - World War I French cruiser design series, never built
- German FK cruiser designs - World War I German cruiser design series, never built
