= Frederick Samuel Augustus Bourne =

British judge, diplomat and botanist

Sir Frederick Bourne CMG
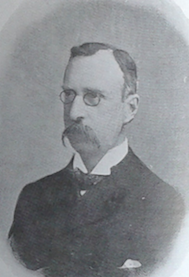

Assistant Judge, British Supreme Court for China
- In office 1898–1916
- Preceded by: George Jamieson
- Succeeded by: Skinner Turner

Judge, British High Court of Weihaiwei
- In office 1904–1916
- Preceded by: New position
- Succeeded by: Hiram Parkes Wilkinson

Personal details
- Born: 3 October 1854 Winfarthing, Norfolk
- Died: 23 August 1940 (aged 85) Mayfield, Sussex, England

Sir Frederick Samuel August Bourne CMG (1854–1940) was a British judge, diplomat and botanist who served in China. His last positions before retirement were concurrently as Assistant Judge of the British Supreme Court for China and Judge of the High Court of Weihaiwei.

== Early life ==
Bourne was born on 3 October 1854. He was the son of Rev. S. W. Bourne, Rector of Winfarthing, Norfolk, and Mary Caroline, daughter of late Henry Cassin, M.D. His father had died leaving "a widow and six children in reduced circumstances." At the age of 18, Bourne commenced work as a clerk in the War Office.

== Consular career ==
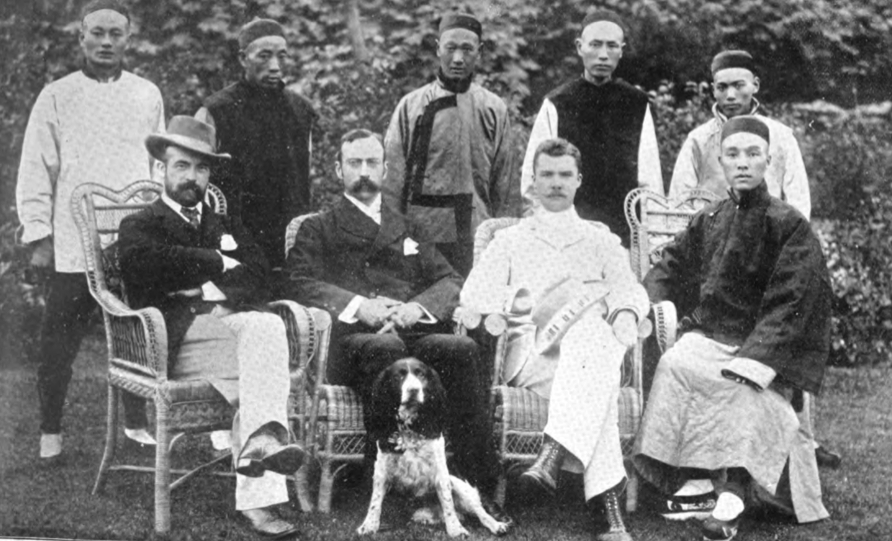
1896 Blackburn Commercial Mission to China, Bourne is seated, 2nd left

He had been advised that "pay and prospects were better in China" and started studying for the Foreign Office exam. He passed a competitive exam on 14 February 1876 and was appointed a student interpreter in China on 10 March 1876.

Bourne served all over China, including Guangzhou, Chongqing, Pagoda Island (near Fuzhou), Wuhu and Tamsui (near Taipei). While in Chongqing he had gone on a six-month tour through modern-day Sichuan, Yunnan, Guangxi and Guizhou to report on the potential for trade. His report was presented to both Houses of the British Parliament in June 1888. From 1896 to 1898, Bourne was consul in charge of a mission by the Blackburn Chamber of Commerce to investigate trade with China.

== Botanist ==
Bourne was also a keen botanist. He collected various botanical samples when in China. The genus Bournea of perennial flowering shrubs is named for him.

== Judicial career ==
Bourne was called to the bar of Lincoln's Inn in 1890 during long leave at home in England.

In 1898, he was appointed Judge of the British Supreme Court for China and Japan based in Shanghai replacing George Jamieson, and serving under Chief Justice Nicholas John Hannen. Following Hannen's death, Hiram Shaw Wilkinson was appointed Chief Justice. In 1901 the position was renamed Assistant Judge. Bourne served as Acting Chief Justice of the court in 1900 and between 1902 and 1903 when Wilkinson was on long leave and as Acting Judge between 1908 and 1909 and in 1911 and 1914 when the then Chief Judge Havilland de Sausmarez was on leave.

In 1904, Bourne was appointed Judge of the High Court of Weihaiwei. He held the position concurrently with his position as judge in Shanghai.

He was made a Companion of the Order of St Michael and St George in 1909

Bourne retired in 1916. Skinner Turner was appointed as the Assistant Judge in his place. Bourne was knighted just before his retirement.

== Death ==
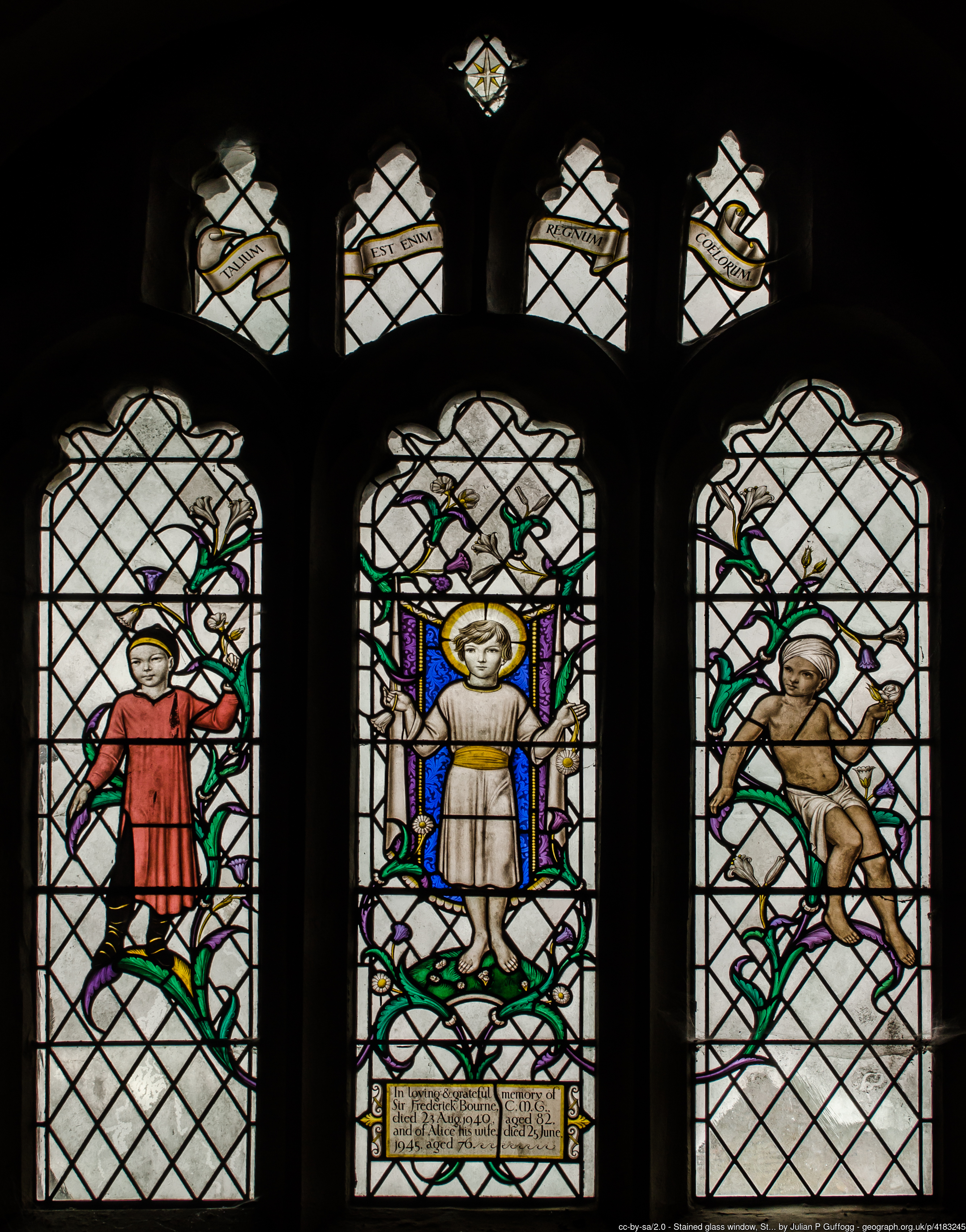
Stained glass window, St Dunstan's church, Mayfield in memory of Sir Frederick Bourne

Sir Frederick Bourne died on 23 August 1940 at the Firs, Mayfield, Sussex England.

A stained glass window, designed by Christopher Webb, in St Dunstan's Church, Mayfield, Surrey has been dedicated to the memory of Bourne and his wife, Alice.

== Publications ==
Bourne published the following books:

- The Lo-fou Mountains: An Excursion
- Gardening in Shanghai for Amateurs
