= Yamagata Corporation =

- Company type: Privately Held
- Industry: Commercial printing, translation, creative services and digital marketing
- Founded: 1906
- Headquarters: 2-6-34, Takashima, Nishi-ku Yokohama; Kanagawa, Japan, 220-8515; Japan
- Area served: Worldwide
- Key people: Ryuji Yamagata, 3rd Generation Chairman & CEO
- Number of employees: 4,000 (2016)
- Website: yamagata-corp.com

Yamagata Printing Co., Ltd (山縣印刷所 Yamagata Insatsu Jo) was founded in 1906 by Heiji Yamagata in Yokohama, Japan. Although in 2005 the company merged with several of its group holdings to become Yamagata Corporation. (YAMAGATA株式会社 Yamagata Kabushiki Kaisha)

With facilities across Asia, Europe, and the US; services range from commercial printing, fulfillment services, translation, design, technical manual creation, event planning, and web-related services.

== History ==
Founded in 1906 to offer printing services to local companies in Yokohama, Japan. Yamagata Printing was the first commercial printing company in Japan to provide English typesetting. Most of the work in the early days were primarily focused on printing forms and stationery items but later in the mid-1950s Yamagata expanded its services to include technical translations.

== We Japanese ==
In 1935, Yamagata in collaboration with Fujiya Hotel published We Japanese, a book about Japanese customs for English-Speakers unfamiliar with Japanese culture. The book became an instant hit with several editions released until 1950, which helped the company recover from the damages caused by the air raids on Japan during the war.

== See also ==
- Fujiya Hotel

== Company Links ==
- Yamagata Corporation's Official Website (English)
- Global Speed--Full-Service Provider of Print Management and Translation Solutions (English)
- Yamagata Intech (English)
