= Gilbert Walter King =

British judge (1871-1937)

Gilbert Walter King OBE
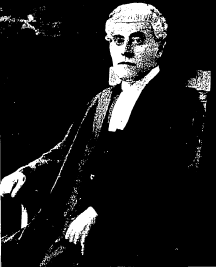

Registrar, British Supreme Court for China
- In office 1908–1930
- Preceded by: John Douglas
- Succeeded by: Cyril Haines

Assistant Judge, British Supreme Court for China
- In office 1927–1931
- Preceded by: Peter Grain
- Succeeded by: Penrhyn Grant Jones

Personal details
- Born: 30 June 1871 Bombay, India
- Died: 23 December 1937 (aged 66) Reigate, England

Gilbert Walter King OBE (30 June 1871 – 23 December 1937) was a British judge who served in China. His last position before retirement was as Assistant Judge of the British Supreme Court for China.

== Early life ==
King was born in Bombay, India, on 30 June 1871. His father, Alfred King, was a storekeeper and then an accountant for the Great Indian Peninsula Railway. His mother, Mary, was also born in Bombay. King was educated at Brighton Grammar School and London University, where he graduated with an LL.B in 1895. He then practiced as a solicitor in London.

== Legal career ==
King was appointed Assistant Clerk of the British Supreme Court for China and Corea on 1 April 1903. At that time, his elder brother, Harold King, was sitting as Acting Assistant Judge of the court. King was promoted to Registrar in 1908 and served in that position until 1927. In 1919, he re-qualified as a barrister and was called to the bar at Gray's Inn. He was awarded an OBE in 1925.

In November 1927, he was appointed Assistant Judge of the court on the promotion of the then Assistant Judge, Peter Grain to Judge.

== Retirement and death ==
King retired in 1931 and was succeeded by Penrhyn Grant Jones.

He died six years later, on 23 December 1937, at his home at Reigate, England, at the age of 66.
