= Peter Grain (judge) =

British judge (1864–1947)

Sir Peter Grain
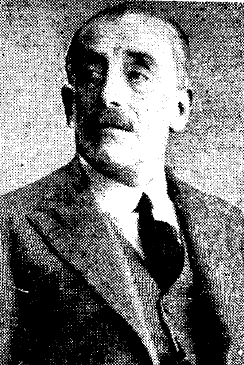

Judge, British Supreme Court for Egypt
- In office 1919–1921

Assistant Judge, British Supreme Court for China
- In office 1921–1927
- Preceded by: Skinner Turner
- Succeeded by: Gilbert Walter King

Judge, British High Court of Weihaiwei
- In office 1925–1930
- Preceded by: Hiram Parkes Wilkinson
- Succeeded by: Court abolished

Chief Judge, British Supreme Court for China
- In office 1927–1933
- Preceded by: Skinner Turner
- Succeeded by: Allan Mossop

Personal details
- Born: 25 September 1864
- Died: 6 May 1947 (aged 82) Farnham Common, England

Sir Peter Grain (1864 – 1947) was a British judge who served in Zanzibar, Egypt, Constantinople and China. He was the Chief Judge of the British Supreme Court for China from 1927 to 1933 and also judge of the High Court of Weihaiwei from 1926 to 1930.

== Early life ==
Grain was born on September 25, 1864. He was the son of John Peter Grain, a well-known criminal barrister in London. He was called to the bar of the Middle Temple in January 1897.

== Career ==
Grain practiced in the criminal courts in London, sometimes as his father's junior, in England for 10 years. He was a member of the Bar Council from 1902 until 1906. In 1906, at the age of 40 or 41, Grain commenced a career with the Foreign Office Judicial Service in Zanzibar.

In 1906, he was made Resident Magistrate at Zanzibar, and the same year he was promoted to be Assistant Judge and a Judge of the Court of Appeal for East Africa. For a time he left the Bench to become Legal Member of Council and Attorney-General to the Government of Zanzibar, and he was for a short time, from August 1907 to April 1908 Acting First Minister there. He was awarded the Zanzibar Order of the Alijah, 1st class.

In 1910, he was made Assistant Judge of the British Supreme Consular Court at Constantinople; then Acting Judge in 1911. During World War I he was the Special Judge in Egypt for the trial of German and Austrian subjects and he was also Judge of the Prize Court there. In 1915, he became Assistant Judge (and Acting Judge between 1917 and 1918) of the British Supreme Court for Egypt. He was appointed as Judge of the British Supreme Court for Egypt in 1919.

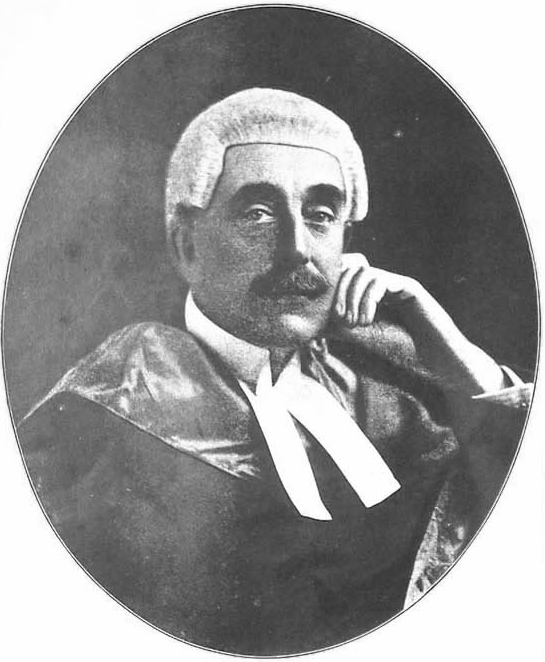
Grain in 1924 in judicial wig

In 1921, Grain was appointed Assistant Judge of the British Supreme Court for China in Shanghai. In 1926 he was concurrently appointed judge of the High Court of Weihaiwei.

In 1927, he was promoted to Chief Judge of the British Supreme Court for China on the retirement of Sir Skinner Turner and was knighted in February 1928. Gilbert Walter King succeeded him as Assistant Judge. He continued to serve a judge in Weihaiwei until the territory was returned Chinese rule on 1 October 1930.

== Retirement and death ==
Grain retired in 1933 and was succeeded by Allan Mossop. He returned to England and died on 6 May 1947, at Farnham Common, Buckinghamshire at the age of 82.
