= Alexander Dunlop Bell =

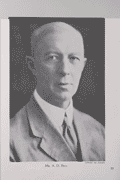

Chairman of the Shanghai Municipal Council
- In office April 1932 – April 1934
- Preceded by: Ernest Macnaghten
- Succeeded by: Harry Edward Arnhold

Personal details
- Born: 4 November 1873 Angus, Scotland
- Died: March 1937 (aged 63)
- Profession: Businessman

Alexander Dunlop Bell (1873–1937) was a businessman who served as the chairman of the Shanghai Municipal Council from 1932 to 1934.

== Life ==
Bell was born on 14 November 1873 in Angus, Scotland. He was the son of Reverend Benjamin Bell and Margaret (Dunlop) Bell. He was educated at Manchester Grammar School and Trinity College, Cambridge, B.A. 1896, M.A. 1900. He married Nora Sunderland in Manchester on 24 June 1903.

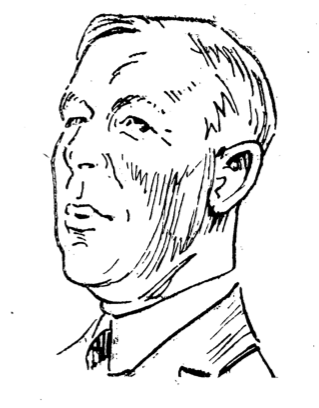
A caricature of Bell by Sapajou

Bell moved to Shanghai in 1907 and joined Barlow and Co, importers. He was manager of the firm until 1930 when he retired from executive duties. He was a member of the board of directors of the Shanghai Gas Company, Shanghai Water Works and Gordon & Co. He was also trustee of the estate of Henry Lester

Bell was a member of the Shanghai Municipal Council from 1924. He was elected chairman in 1932 and 1933.

== Death ==
Bell died in March 1937 in Shanghai. With the closing of foreign cemeteries in the 1950s in Shanghai, his body was reinterred at Hong Kong Cemetery, Happy Valley, Hong Kong in 1956.
