= Penrhyn Grant Jones =

British judge and diplomat (1878–1945)

Penrhyn Grant Jones CBE
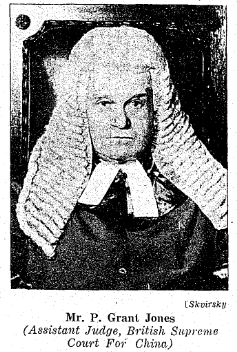

Assistant Judge, British Supreme Court for China
- In office 1931–1943
- Preceded by: Gilbert Walter King
- Succeeded by: Court abolished

Personal details
- Born: 28 May 1878 Cowes, Isle of Wight
- Died: 15 June 1945 (aged 67) Ticehurst, Sussex, England

Penrhyn Grant Jones CBE (1878–1945) was a British judge and diplomat who served in China. His last position before retirement was as Assistant Judge of the British Supreme Court for China.

== Early life ==
Grant Jones was born on 28 May 1878, in Cowes, Isle of Wight. He was the eldest son of Frederick Topham Jones, who had been an actor, and Elizabeth Grant Jones (née Fitzgerald). Frederick was the owner of the Royal Sandrock Hotel near Niton on the Isle of Wight, a fashionable resort with its own spring. His father was also rector on the Isle of Wight. His father was declared bankrupt in 1897 and he lost the hotel.

Grant Jones was educated at Malvern College, where he was a prefect.

== Consular service ==
Grant Jones came to China in 1902 as a student interpreter with the China Consular Service, having passed a competitive exam. He was promoted to be a 2nd Class Assistant on July 15, 1909. He served in various consular capacities around China, including Shanghai, Chongqing, Hankow and Changsha. He was promoted to Consul in 1926 in Harbin and served as Consul there and in Amoy (Xiamen) until 1931. He was made a Commander of the Order of the British Empire in the 1928 Birthday Honours while in Harbin.

== Legal career ==
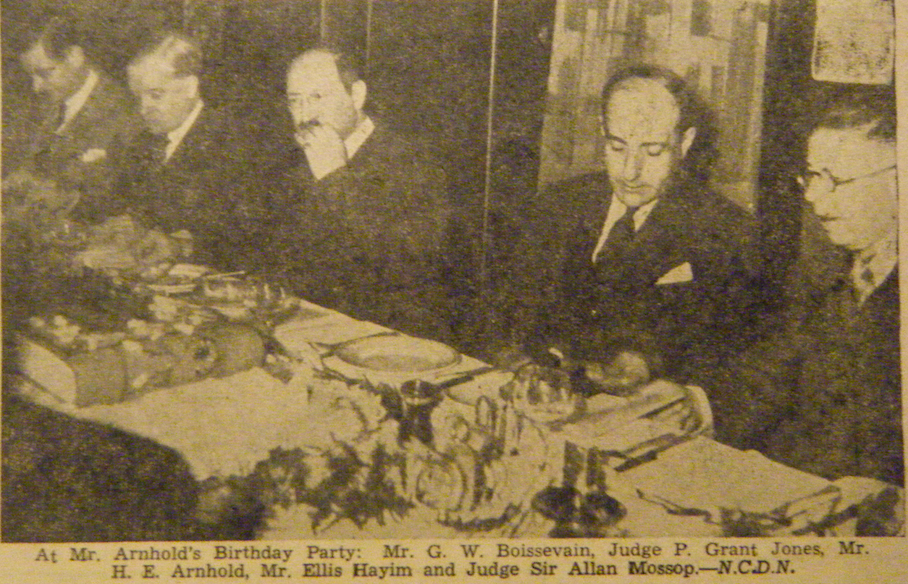
Grant Jones (second left) at a birthday Party for H.E. Arnhold in Shanghai in 1939. Also present G.W. Boosevain, Ellis Hayim and Judge Allan Mossop

Grant Jones passed his bar exams, being placed in the first class and was awarded a certificate of honour. He was admitted as a barrister of the Inner Temple in 1910 and called to the bar on 19 June 1912. He sat as an assessor on the International Mixed Court in the Shanghai International Settlement between 1912 and 1920. He also sat as acting Judge of the High Court of Weihaiwei in 1919.

In November 1931, he was appointed Judge of the British Supreme Court for China based in Shanghai replacing Gilbert Walter King. Grant Jones served as Acting Chief Judge of the court in 1933 and 1937.

== Closure of court, retirement and death ==
On 8 December 1941, Japanese troops occupied the court house of the British Supreme Court in Shanghai. Grant Jones was interned for 5 months before being repatriated to England.

His appointment as judge was formally terminated in May 1943 after the Sino-British Treaty for the Relinquishment of Extra-Territorial Rights in China was ratified.

After returning to England, Grant Jones retired to Ticehurst in Sussex. He died on 15 June 1945. and was buried in the cemetery of St Mary's Church, Ticehurst. He was a resident of Ticehurst House, an asylum and mental hospital at the time of his death.
