= Saumarez Smith (disambiguation) =

Saumarez Smith (1836–1909) was a British-born Anglican Archbishop of Sydney, Australia.

Saumarez Smith may also refer to:

- Charles Saumarez Smith (born 1954), British cultural historian
- Joe Saumarez Smith (1971–2025), British entrepreneur, journalist and gambling expert

== See also ==
- Saumarez (disambiguation)
- J. Denis Summers-Smith
