= Allan Mossop =

British judge of South African origin (1887-1965)

Sir Allan Mossop
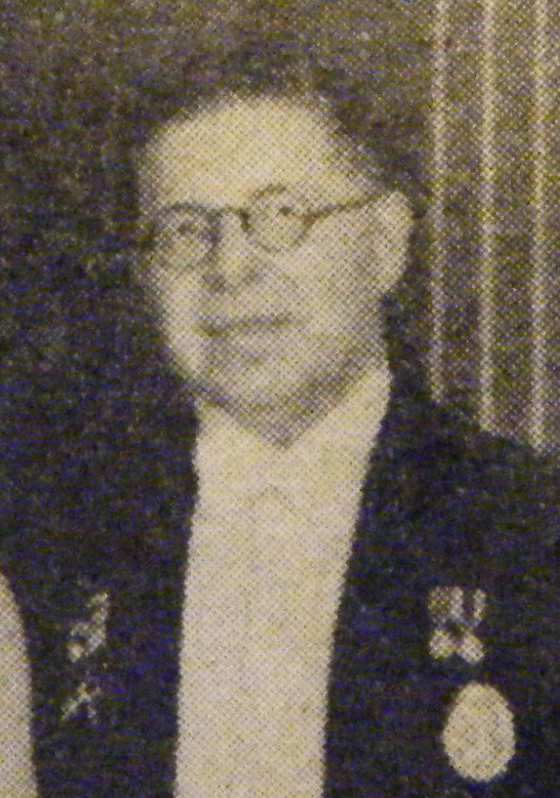

Chief Judge, British Supreme Court for China
- In office 1933–1943
- Preceded by: Peter Grain
- Succeeded by: Court abolished

British Crown Advocate for China
- In office 1925–1933
- Preceded by: Hiram Parkes Wilkinson
- Succeeded by: Victor Priestwood

Personal details
- Born: Allan George Mossop; 30 July 1887 Cape Colony
- Died: 14 June 1965 (aged 77) Cape Town, Cape Province, South Africa

Sir Allan George Mossop (30 July 1887 – 14 June 1965) was a British judge of South African origin who served in China. He was the Chief Judge of the British Supreme Court for China from 1933 to 1943.

== Early life ==
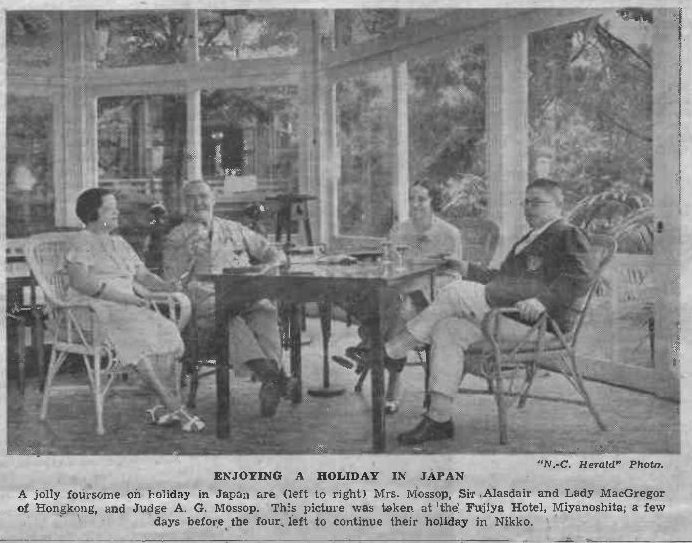
Mossop and Atholl MacGregor, Chief Justice of Hong Kong, at the Fujiya Hotel in Japan 1935

Mossop was born in Fish Hoek, in the Cape Colony in 1887 and was the seventh son of Joseph Mossop. He was educated at the Kingswood College, Grahamstown and the South African College, Cape Town. He then went to university in England attending Pembroke College, Cambridge graduating with an MA and LLB. He was called to the Bar of the Inner Temple in 1908.

== Career ==
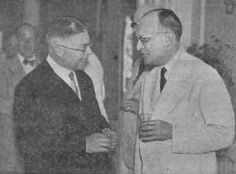
Mossop with US Consul General Clarence E. Gauss in Shanghai in 1939

Mossop moved to Shanghai, China soon after being called as a barrister and was admitted to practice before the British Supreme Court for China and Corea in 1909.

In 1916, Mossop was appointed the Crown Advocate for Weihaiwei when Hiram Parkes Wilkinson, the Crown Advocate for China who had held that position was appointed Judge in Weihaiwei. In 1926 on Wilkinson's retirement as Crown Advocate for China, Mossop was appointed Crown Advocate for China. As Crown Advocate, Mossop was allowed to continue private practice as a barrister.

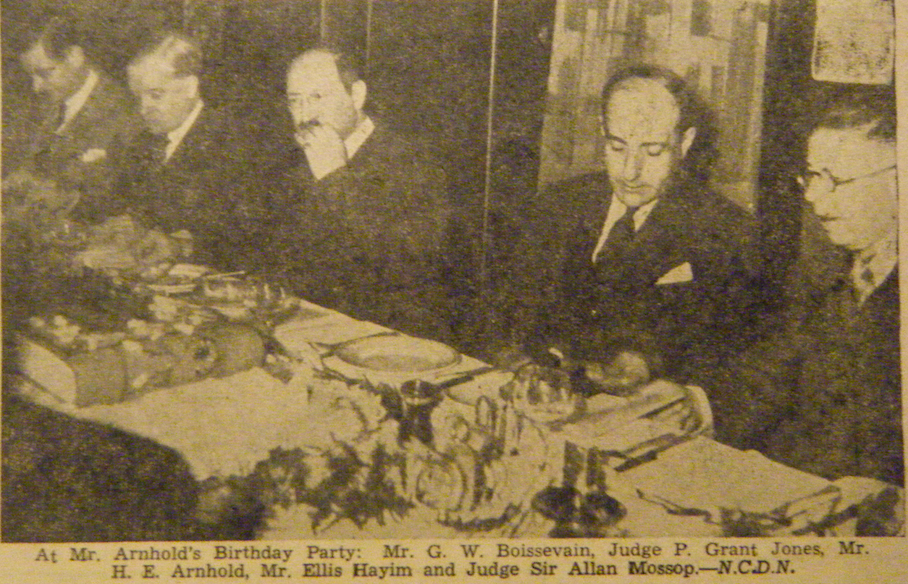
Mossop (far right) at a birthday Party for H.E. Arnhold in Shanghai in 1939. Also present G.W. Boosevain, Asst Judge Penrhyn Grant Jones and Ellis Hayim.

In December 1933, he was appointed Chief Judge of the British Supreme Court for China on the retirement of Sir Peter Grain. He was knighted in May 1937 as a Knight Bachelor.

== Closure of Court, Retirement and Death ==
At the beginning of the Pacific War, on 8 December 1941, Japanese troops occupied the court house of the British Supreme Court in Shanghai. Mossop was interned for 5 months before being repatriated to England.

His appointment as judge was formally terminated in May 1943 after the Sino-British Treaty for the Relinquishment of Extra-Territorial Rights in China was ratified.

Mossop returned to China in 1946 as an advisor to the British Embassy in China. He retired in 1947 and returned to his home in Fish Hoek, Cape Town, South Africa. He died on 14 June 1965 in Cape Town. He was buried in Muizenberg Cemetery, Cape Town.
