= Arnhold (surname) =

Arnhold is a surname. Notable people with the surname include:

- Georg Arnhold (1849–1926), German banker
- Harry Edward Arnhold (1879–1950), British hotelier.
- Henry H. Arnhold (1921–2018), American banker and philanthropist.
- Johann Samuel Arnhold (1766–1828), German painter.
- Mirella Arnhold (born 1983), Brazilian alpine skier.
