= De Sausmarez baronets =

Extinct baronetcy in the Baronetage of the United Kingdom

The de Sausmarez Baronetcy, of Jerbourg in the Island of Guernsey, was a title in the Baronetage of the United Kingdom.

It was created on 26 June 1928 for Havilland de Sausmarez who had been a judge of various British courts in Africa, the Ottoman Empire and China.

The title became extinct upon the death of Sir Havilland Walter de Sausmarez in 1941.

== de Sausmarez baronets, of Jerburg (1928) ==
- Sir Havilland Walter de Sausmarez, 1st Baronet (1861–1941)
