= Ernest Macnaghten =

British Army officer

Brigadier-General Ernest Macnaghten CMG DSO
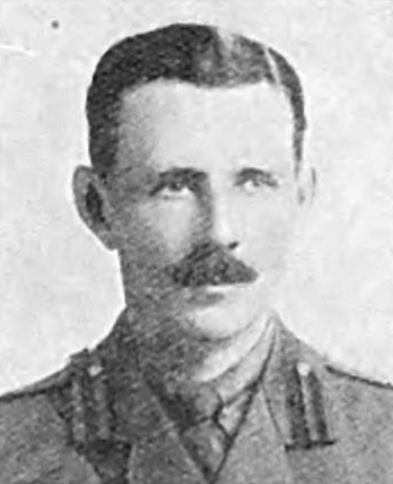

Chairman of the Shanghai Municipal Council
- In office April 1930 – April 1932
- Preceded by: Harry Edward Arnhold
- Succeeded by: A.D. Bell

Personal details
- Born: 11 September 1872 India
- Died: 21 November 1948 (aged 76)
- Profession: Army Officer

Brigadier-General Ernest Brander Macnaghten CMG DSO (11 September 1872 – 21 November 1948) was a British Army officer who also served as chairman of the Shanghai Municipal Council from 1930 to 1932.

== Early life ==
Ernest Brander Macnaghten was born 11 September 1872 in India, the son of William Hay Macnaghten and Alice Ellen Brander. He was educated at Wellington College, Berkshire and the Royal Military Academy, Woolwich, where he was awarded the Sword of Honour.

== Military career ==
Macnaghten was commissioned in the Royal Artillery in November 1892. and was promoted to lieutenant on 9 November 1895. He served in India (1894–1896), West Africa (1898–1899), and in South Africa (1900–1902) during the Second Boer War, when he was promoted to captain on 18 April 1900 and attached to the Rhodesian Field Force. Following the end of this war, he served in Somaliland (1903–1904), India (1905–1909), England (1910–1914) and in France during World War I where he was awarded two brevets, CMG, DSO, Croix de Guerre and eight mentions in dispatches. He rose to the rank of colonel.

== Shanghai ==
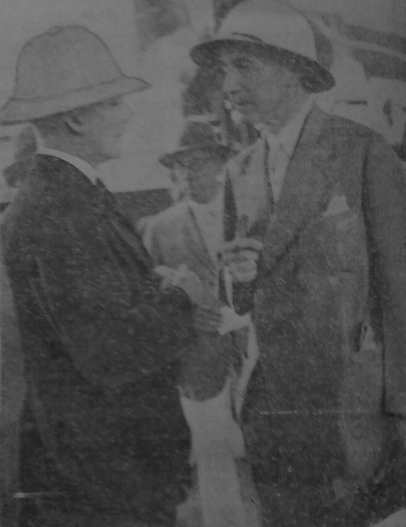
Machaghten (right) as Chairman of the Shanghai Municipal Council talks with Justice Richard Feetham in 1931

After the war, Macnaghten resigned his commission with the honorary rank of brigadier general.

He joined British American Tobacco in Shanghai, China. From 1930 to 1932 he served as Chairman of the Shanghai Municipal Council. He was also President of the United Services Association and the St Andrew's Society.

== Marriage and children ==
Macnaghten married Yvonne Marie Forrester at Windsor, England on 4 October 1906. They had five children, Susan May, Joan Yvonne Marie, Audrey Clarisse and James Steuart (twins) and Garrelle Renee.

== Retirement and death ==
Macnaghten retired to his house Haygates in Finchampstead, Berkshire. He died on 21 November 1948 in the same town.
