= Fujiya Hotel =

Hotel in Hakone, Japan, built 1891

Coordinates: 35.244235°N 139.059123°E

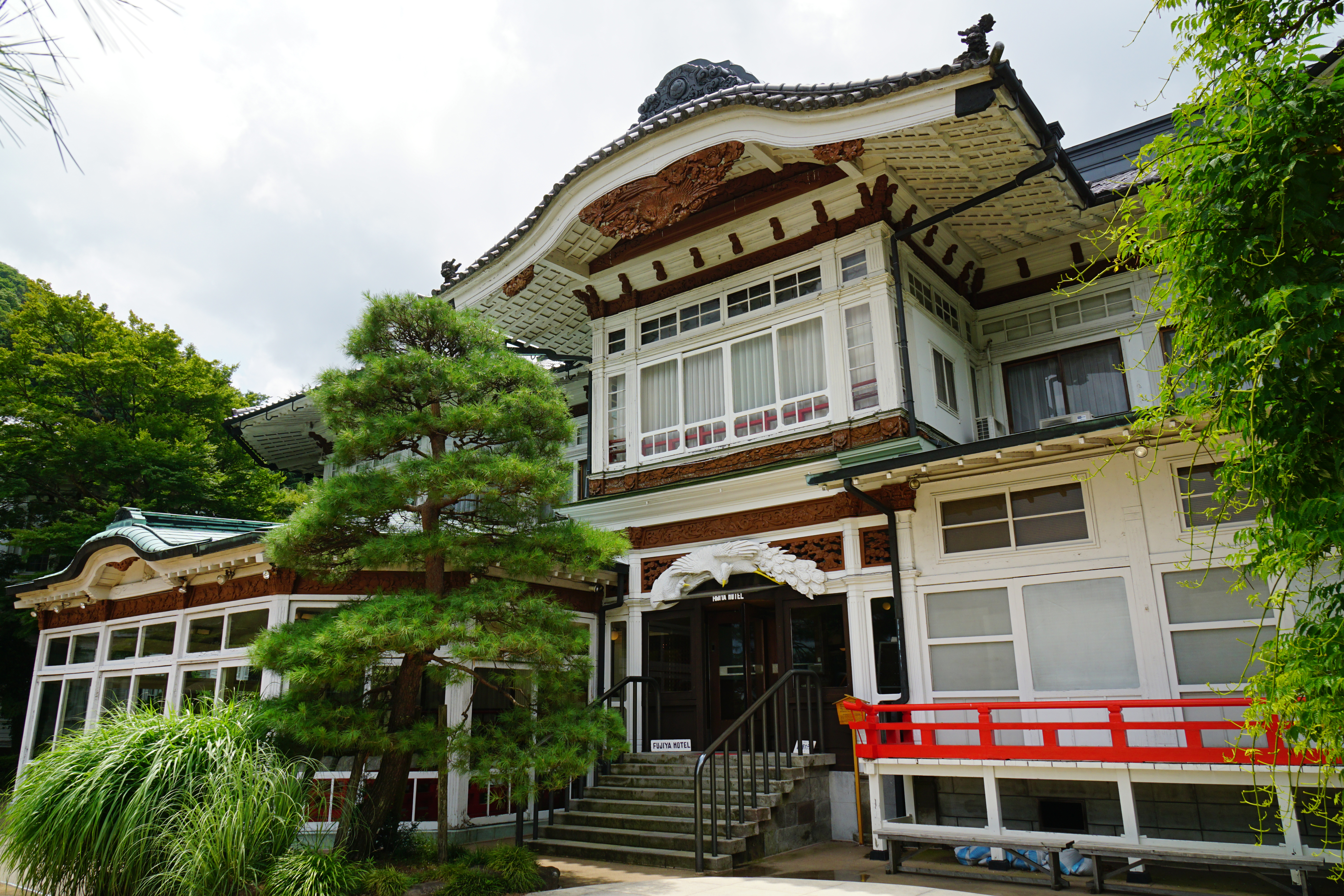
- Main building

General information
- Location: Hakone, Kanagawa, Japan
- Opening: 1891

Website
- www.fujiyahotel.jp

The Fujiya Hotel (富士屋ホテル) is a historic hotel in Miyanoshita in Hakone, Kanagawa, Japan.

== History ==
The hotel was constructed in 1891 and consists of different sections constructed in a mixture of traditional Japanese and western architecture that was popular during the Meiji period. Many famous guests have stayed there, including Archduke Franz Ferdinand of Austria on his tour of Japan in 1893, Albert Einstein in 1922, Chiang Kai-shek in 1927, and John Lennon and Yoko Ono with their son Sean in 1978.

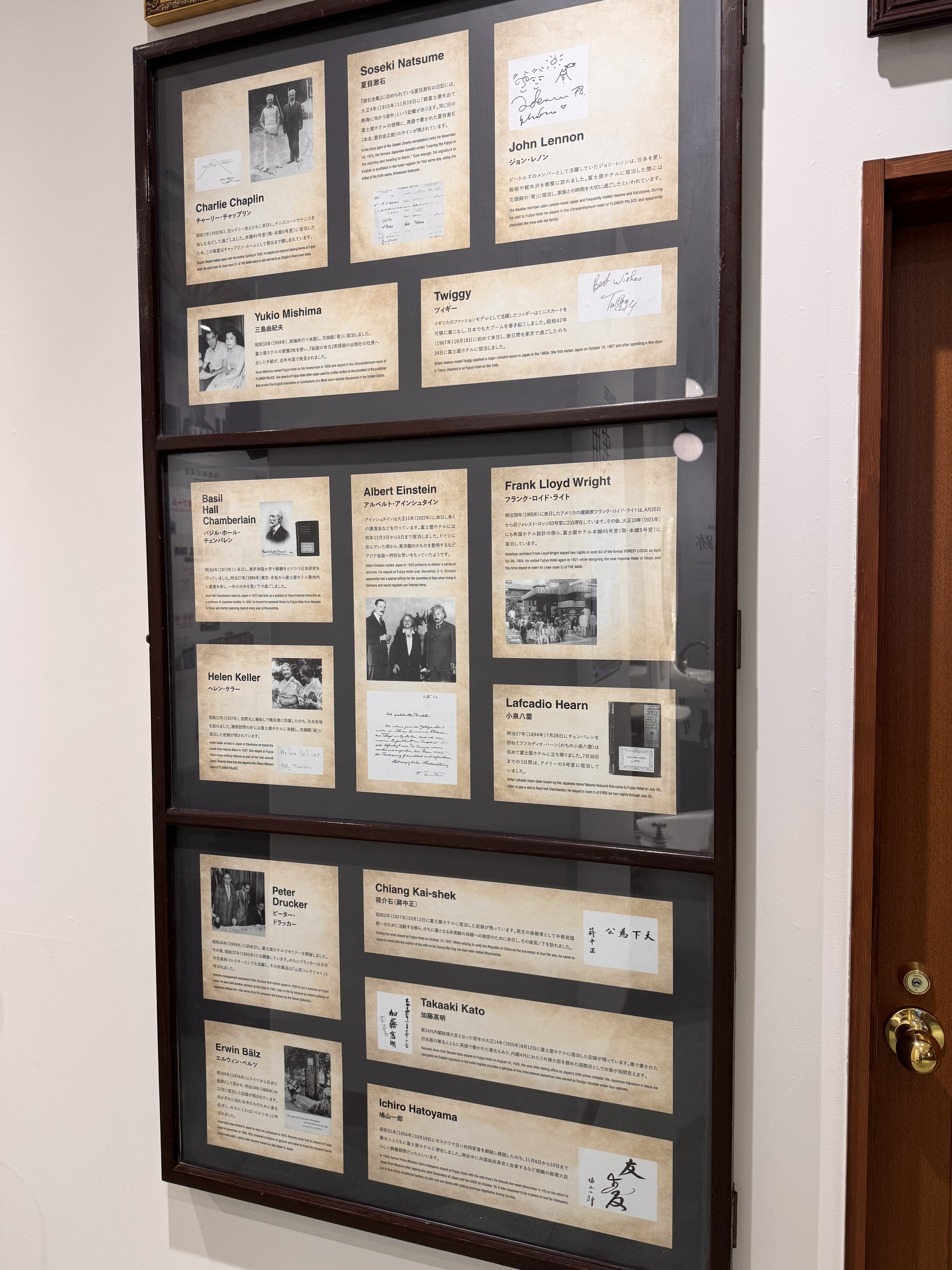
Notable guests

The group hotel "Fuji View Hotel" in Kawaguchi-ko was a refuge for German Embassy after 1945 in World War II, including German Ambassador Heinrich Georg Stahmer. On September 6, 1945 - four days after the end of the war - agents of the US Counter-Intelligence Corps arrested Gestapo Colonel Josef Albert Meisinger there.

== Publications ==
Starting in 1934, the hotel in collaboration with Yamagata Corporation published a series of three books on Japanese customs, with the final volume published in 1949. The three volumes were subsequently bound into one, under the title We Japanese: Being Descriptions of Many of the Customs, Manners, Ceremonies, Festivals, Arts and Crafts of the Japanese, Besides Numerous Other Subjects. Editions were released at least until 1950.

The Fujiya Hotel (both in the 1950s and the present day) is the location for the best-selling novel An Exquisite Sense of What is Beautiful by J. David Simons. The author stayed at the hotel several times during the seven years he spent in Japan in the 1990s.

== Gallery ==
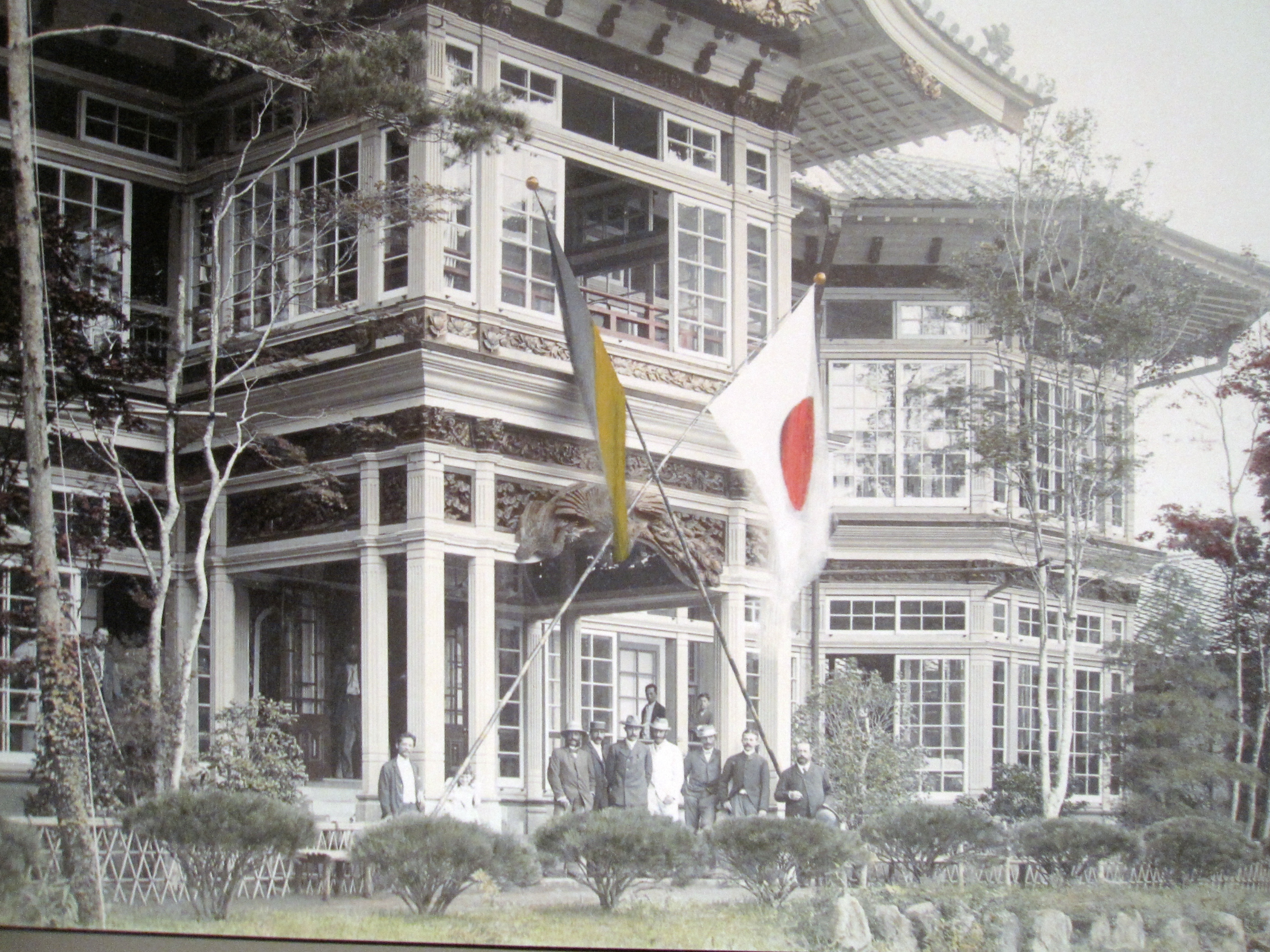
Archduke Franz Ferdinand of Austria visiting the hotel in 1893

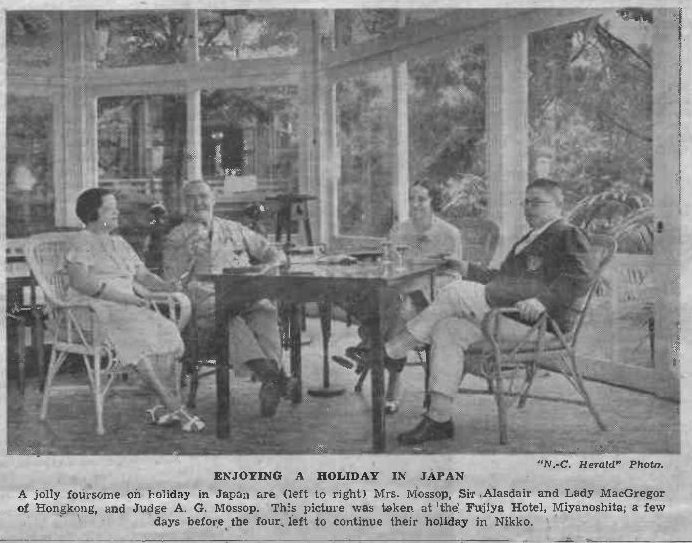
Atholl MacGregor, Chief Justice of Hong Kong and Allan Mossop, Judge of the British Supreme Court for China, at the Fujiya Hotel in 1935

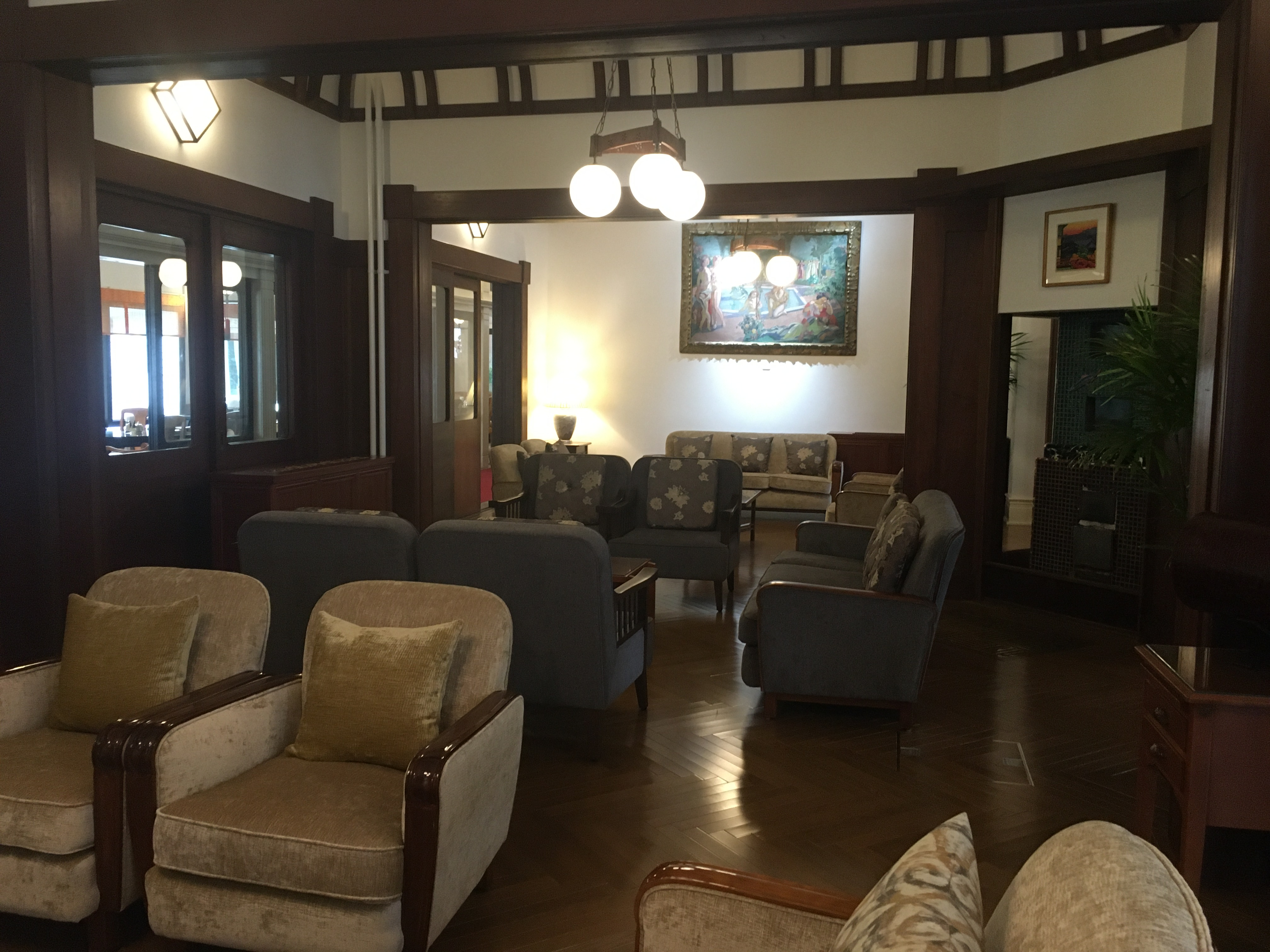
Inside the hotel, 2020

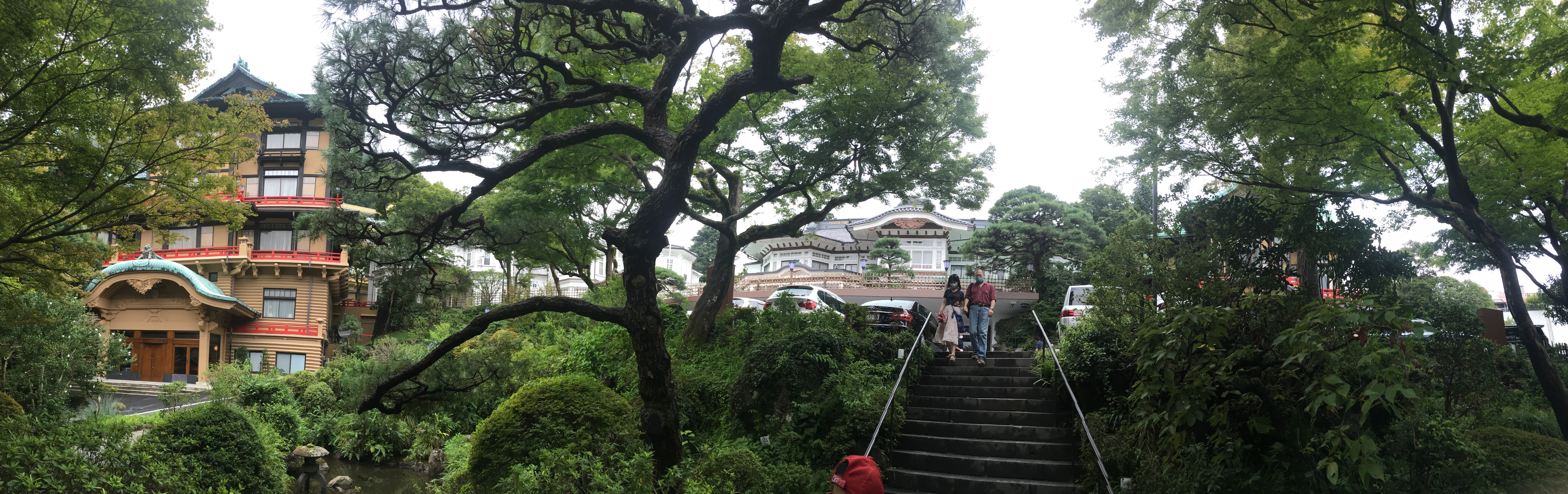
In front of the hotel, 2020

== See also ==
- Nara Hotel
- Hōshi Ryokan
- Dōgo Onsen
