= Annie, Lady de Sausmarez =

British philanthropist (1856–1947)

Lady de Sausmarez GBE
- Lady de Sausmarez, 1920

President of the British Women's Work Association in Shanghai
- In office 1914–1919

Personal details
- Born: Annie Elizabeth Mann; 1856 Wyham cum Cadeby, Lincolnshire, England
- Died: 15 March 1947 (aged 90–91) Guernsey
- Spouse: Sir Havilland de Sausmarez, 1st Baronet
- Occupation: Philanthropist

Annie Elizabeth, Lady de Sausmarez, GBE (née Mann; 1856 – 15 March 1947) was a British philanthropist who was president of the British Women's Work Association in China from 1914 to 1919. For this she was appointed Dame Grand Cross of the Order of the British Empire (GBE) in the 1920 civilian war honours.

Sausmarez was born in Wyham cum Cadeby, Lincolnshire, England, the daughter of clergyman Frederick William Mann from Guernsey and Eleanor Mary Pattison from Yorkshire. She was the niece, through her mother, of Mark Pattison, an Oxford academic. The family moved to Guernsey when she was young.

In 1897, Sausmarez married Guernseyman Havilland de Sausmarez, a judge in the Foreign Office Judicial Service. He was a judge of the British Supreme Consular Court in the Ottoman Empire until 1905, when he was knighted and appointed judge of the British Supreme Court for China and Korea (based in Shanghai).

Between 1914 and 1919, Sausmarez served as president of the British Women's Work Association in Shanghai. She organized the war effort to supply British troops with bandages and clothing in September 1914 and by November had organized the Work Association's first shipment. Under her leadership, "hundreds of thousands of bandages, dressings, and hospital garments" were sent to troops serving in Mesopotamia during the war. For her service to the war effort, she was honoured as a Dame Grand Cross of the Order of the British Empire (GBE) in 1920.

They lived in Shanghai until 1920, when they returned to Guernsey, where Sir Havilland served as Bailiff of Guernsey from 1922 to 1929. Sir Havilland died on 5 March 1941. They did not have any children. Lady de Sausmarez died at her home in Guernsey, aged 90, on 15 March 1947 and was cremated after her services at St Martin's Parish Church, Guernsey on 18 March.
