= Hiram Parkes Wilkinson =

British judge (1866-1935)

Hiram Parkes Wilkinson KC
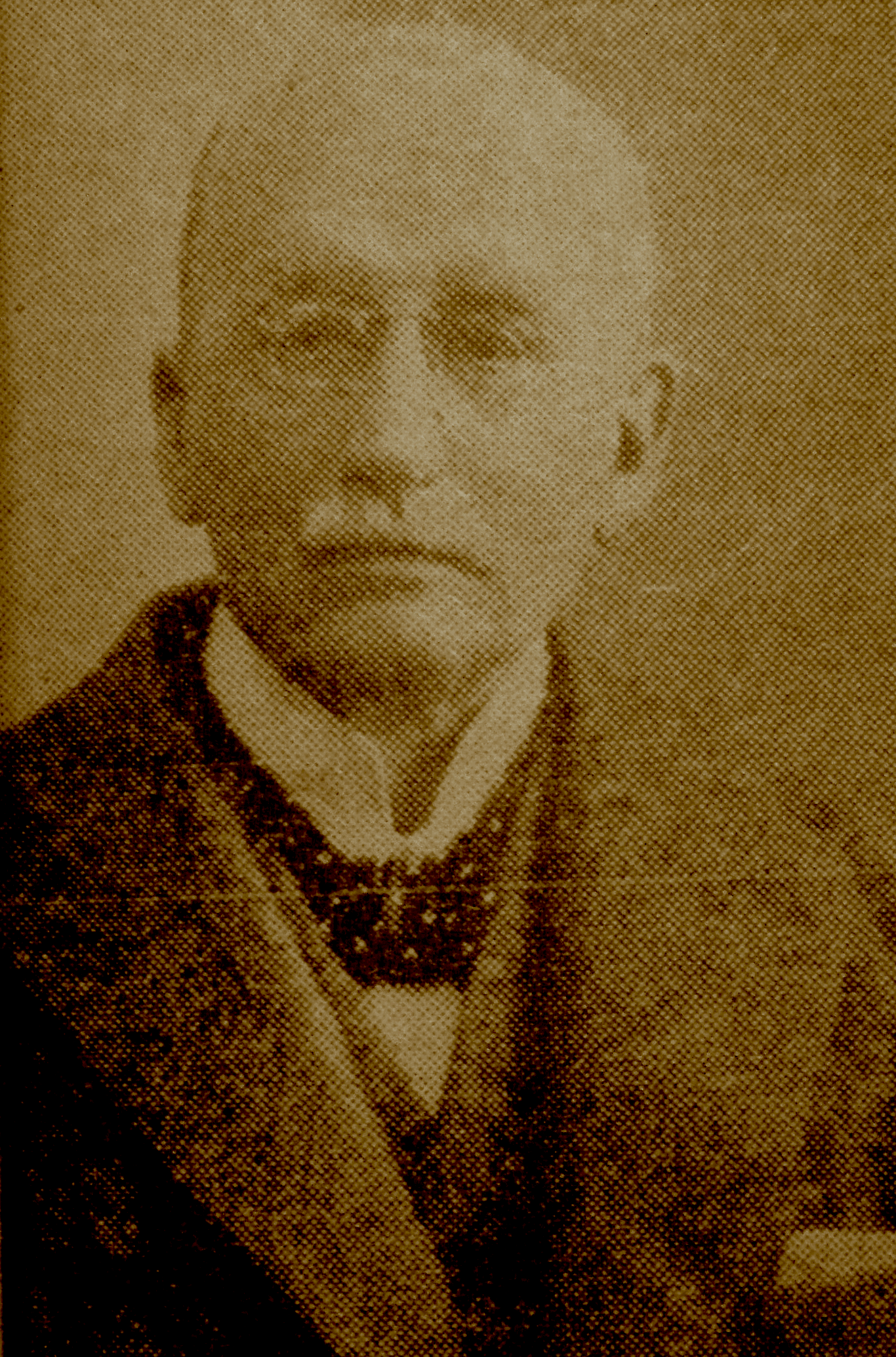

British Crown Advocate for China
- In office 1897–1925
- Preceded by: Hiram Shaw Wilkinson
- Succeeded by: Allan Mossop

Judge, British High Court of Weihaiwei
- In office 1916–1925
- Preceded by: Frederick Samuel Augustus Bourne
- Succeeded by: Peter Grain

Personal details
- Born: 9 June 1866 Yokohama, Japan
- Died: 1 April 1935 (aged 68) Shanghai International Settlement
- Cause of death: Pneumonia
- Parent: Hiram Shaw Wilkinson (father)
- Education: Methodist College Belfast
- Alma mater: Exeter College, Oxford

Hiram Parkes "Harrie" Wilkinson, KC (9 June 1866 – 1 April 1935) served as Crown Advocate of the British Supreme Court for China and Japan from 1897 to 1925. He was also Acting Assistant Judge of the British Court for Siam from 1903 to 1905 and Judge of the British High Court of Weihaiwei from 1916 to 1925.

He was the son of Sir Hiram Shaw Wilkinson who also served as Crown Advocate, Judge of the British Court for Japan and Chief Justice of the British Supreme Court for China and Corea.

== Early life ==
Wilkinson was born on 9 June 1866 in a bungalow at the British Legation on the Bluff in Yokohama, Japan while his father was a student interpreter in the British Japan Consular Service. He was called Harrie by his family. He was presumably named after Harry Parkes who was then British Minister in Japan.

He was brought up in Japan before attending school at the Methodist College Belfast and Exeter College, Oxford.

After qualifying as a barrister in 1890, he practiced briefly on the Western Circuit before he went to Shanghai to join his father who was then in practice as the British Crown Advocate in Shanghai.

== Career ==
During his time in Asia he served as:

- Acting Crown Advocate of the British Supreme Court for China and Japan (1894-1895)
- Crown Advocate of the British Supreme Court for China and Japan (renamed the Supreme Court for China and Corea between 1900 and 1910 and the Supreme Court for China from 1910 onwards) (1897–1925)
- Acting Chief Justice of the British Supreme Court for China and Japan (1898)
- Acting Assistant Judge of the British Supreme Court for China and Japan (1898)
- British Claims Commissioner under the Boxer Protocol (1901)
- Acting Assistant Judge of the British Court for Siam (1903–1905)
- British Claims Commissioner following the 1905 Mixed Court riots in Shanghai (1907)
- Judge of the British High Court of Weihaiwei (1916–1925)

From 1900 to 1905 while his father served as Chief Justice of the British Supreme Court for China and Corea, Wilkinson was required to take leave from his post as Crown Advocate of that court. WC Platt and Duncan McNeill acted in his place during this time.

In 1925 he retired from his position as Crown Advocate and Judge and returned to Ireland and moved to Moneyshanere, Tobermore. Allan Mossop succeeded him as Crown Advocate and Peter Grain succeeded him as Judge in Weihaiwei. On his retirement, the North China Herald, published a long article of Wilkinson's reminiscences that recounted his career in the Far East.

== Later life ==
Wilkinson was admitted to the bar of Northern Ireland in 1926 and he was appointed a King's Counsel in 1928. In 1930, he was appointed High Sheriff of Londonderry.

He founded the Tobermore Unionist Club, which later became a branch of the Ulster Volunteers, which itself became part of the 36th Ulster Division in World War I.

Wilkinson returned to Asia in 1932 spending his time between Hong Kong and Shanghai. He resumed legal practice in both cities. He died of pneumonia in Shanghai in 1935 and was buried in Bubbling Well Road Cemetery (now Jingan Park).
