= Harry Edward Arnhold =

H.E. Arnhold
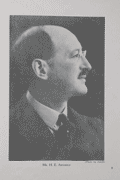

Chairman of the Shanghai Municipal Council
- In office April 1929 – April 1931
- Preceded by: Stirling Fessenden
- Succeeded by: Ernest Macnaghten
- In office April 1934 – April 1937
- Preceded by: A.D. Bell
- Succeeded by: Cornell Franklin

Personal details
- Born: 16 January 1879 Hong Kong
- Died: 1950 New York
- Profession: Businessman

Harry Edward Arnhold (born 16 January 1879 in Hong Kong) was, for five, years the chairman of the Shanghai Municipal Council, the body that administered the Shanghai International Settlement in Shanghai, China; the chairman of Arnhold & Co., which is now Arnhold Holdings Ltd.; and the chairman of the Shanghai Land Investment Company, which owned the Broadway Mansions apartment building in the Hongkou District of Shanghai. Arnhold was a close business associate of Sir Victor Sassoon, and managed various Sassoon enterprises.

== Personal details ==
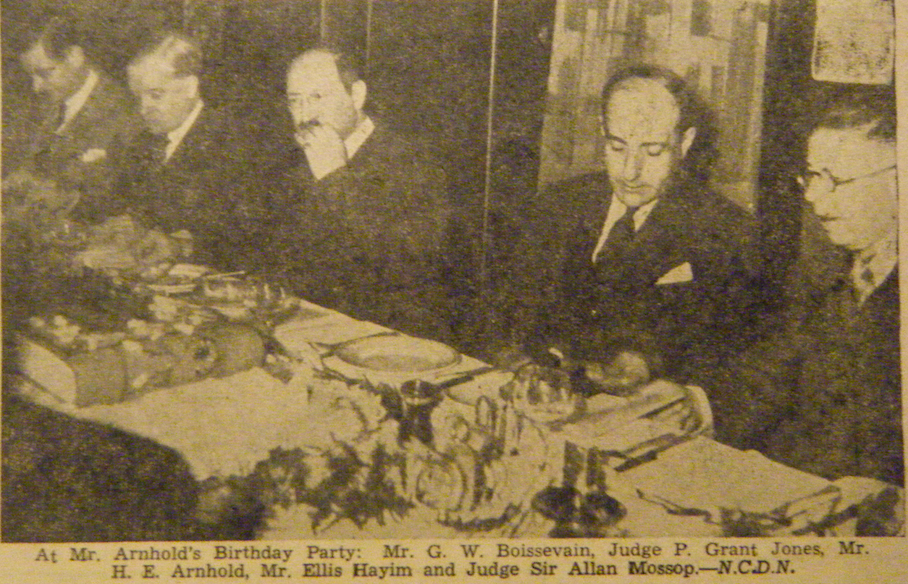
Birthday Party for H.E. Arnhold in Shanghai in 1939. Also present G.W. Boosevain, Penrhyn Grant Jones, Ellis Hayim, Sir Allan Mossop

Born in Hong Kong on 16 January 1879, Arnhold was a British Jew of German ancestry. He was the son of Anne née Wolfers (1852–1916) and Jacob Arnhold (born 1837 – died July 1903 at London), nephew of Phillip Arnhold (born 1851 – died on 29 March 1910 at Altona, Hamburg in Germany), and brother of Charles Herbert Arnhold (born 19 September 1881 in London - died 1954). The family moved to London and were naturalised in 1882; in 1891, at the age of 12, he and his brother Charles were baptised at St Mark, Notting Hill; and he was educated in Britain.

Harry Arnhold's first marriage in 1904 was to Daisy Grace née Homan of Indiana (1880–?) they divorced in 1906; his second marriage in 1907 was to Mary Oldham née Alberga of London (1881–1949), this marriage also ended in divorce. Arnhold's third marriage in the early 1940s was to Esther Jean née Miller (1898–1965) of Oregon, USA previously the wife of William Selman Gassaway (1901–1981). Jean was eighteen years younger than Arnhold.

During World War II, Arnhold and his wife were interned by the Japanese. Jean was allowed to leave Shanghai on the MS Gripsholm in 1942. Arnhold was kept a prisoner for the remainder of the war. After the war, Arnold and his wife made their home in Hong Kong. In 1949, the Arnholds decided to move to New York. Harry died the following year at the age of 70. Jean died in 1965. In her will she established the Esther Jean Arnhold Fund to be administered by Community Funds Inc. She asked that income from the Fund be used to benefit young people and the arts.

== Career ==
=== Arnhold, Karberg & Co. ===
Arnhold & Karberg & Co. was founded as a German-registered company in September 1866 on Shameen Island in Canton (Guangzhou) by Jacob Arnhold and Peter Karberg, and opened branches in Hong Kong (1867) and Shanghai (1881), and had 37 branches by 1901, including branches in Hankow, Tientsin (Tianjin), Peking (Beijing), Canton, Mukden, London and New York. From 1897 to 1910, at least one of the Arnhold family was chairman of the company's board of directors: Jacob Arnhold (1897–1900), Philipp Arnhold (1900–1905; and 1906-1910); and Harry Edward Arnhold (1905–1906). Due to hostility to German companies as a consequence of World War I, and the seizure of German companies by the British and their allies, Harry Arnhold and his brother, Charles Herbert Arnhold, "advertised themselves out of the well-known Anglo-German concern, Arnhold, Karberg & Co.". Arnhold, Karberg had four partners: the two Arnhold brothers, who held 43% of the shares; Ernest Goetz, a Swiss born German subject; and Max Niclassen, of Berlin, Germany.

=== Messrs. H.E. Arnold (China) (1914–1917) ===
Initially they formed the firm of Messrs. H.E. Arnhold (China).

=== Arnhold Brothers Limited (China) (1917) ===
On 1 October 1917, they incorporated Arnhold Brothers Limited (China), in Hong Kong, under the British ordinances, but with headquarters in Shanghai, (which was reconstituted as a British company after 1919. Sir Victor Sassoon became the majority shareholder in 1923 after a merger According to Stella Dong, its "most attractive asset was the Cathay Land Company, ownership of which gave Sir Victor control of a number of apartment buildings and a hotel in the Shanghai International Settlement as well as choice housing estates in the French Concession." Arnhold's served as a front for Sassoon's political interests in the International Settlement.

=== Arnhold & Co. (1919) ===
Harry Arnhold was the initial chairman of Arnhold & Company, a trading company that became a leading distributor of building materials and engineering equipment.

Headquartered in the Arnhold Building at 6 Kiukiang Road, Shanghai until its relocation in 1930 to the third floor of Sassoon House at 1 Nanking Road. Arnhold & Co. flourished until 1949 when, with the change of Government in China, the headquarters relocated to Hong Kong. Mr. Maurice Green who had been associated with the company since the Sassoon takeover, acquired the controlling interest in Arnhold in 1957.

=== New Engineering and Shipbuilding Works ===
Arnhold was chairman of the New Engineering and Shipbuilding Works.

=== Shanghai Land Investment Company ===
The Shanghai Land Investment Company Limited was formed in December 1888.

== Other activities ==
=== Shanghai Municipal Council ===
Arnhold was the chairman of the Shanghai Municipal Council (SMC) from 1929 to 1931, and again from 1934 to April 1937. Arnhold was popular with "the ratepayer community" in the 1920s. Arnhold was defeated for re-election as a member of the SMC in 1930 for his "reformist" tendencies. He also attracted antisemitic and anti-German hostility. Arnhold's defeat was warmly welcomed, as the diplomats disliked him. 'Not an attractive personality,' noted Sir Miles Lampson, the then British Minister. Arnhold was to re-emerge as a settler community leader in the 1930s, and then back on the SMC from 1932 to 1937, chairing it in 1934–37. He won the election for chair in 1934 by 8 votes to 6 against acting chairman Ernest Macnaghten Macnaghten had succeeded Arnhold as chairman in 1931 but had stood down in 1933 to be succeeded by Alexander Dunlop Bell who had resigned. Arnhold decided not to contest re-election to the council in the elections held on 5–6 April 1937.

=== British Chamber of Commerce (Shanghai) ===
Arnhold was Chairman of the British Chamber of Commerce in Shanghai (1923);

=== British Residents' Association ===
Arnhold served as chairman of the British Residents' Association.
