= Arnhold Holdings Ltd. =

Arnhold Holdings Ltd (Stock Code: SEHK 0102) is a public company listed on the Hong Kong Stock Exchange and is a leading name in the distribution of building materials and engineering equipment in China. It is the corporate descendant of Arnhold, Karberg & Co., a company founded in 1857, and prominent "amongst the merchants who have contributed largely to the development of China's commerce" in the late nineteenth and early twentieth centuries. Employing more than 650 people, its headquarters has been in Hong Kong since 1949, with sales offices in both Shanghai and Macau.

== History ==
Though Germany was not a colonial power in Asia, its merchants carried on an active trade there. Throughout the nineteenth century, German firms became increasingly competitive with those of other western countries. In the opening decades of the twentieth century Canton (modern day Guangzhou) was the centre for trade, but it declined in importance with the development of ports in Hong Kong and Shanghai.

=== L.E. Lebert & Oxford, Canton ===
The firm of L.E. Lebert & Oxford was formed in Canton on 4 December 1857. Lebert subsequently terminated his involvement in the firm, leading to the creation of Oxford and Co.

=== Arnhold, Karberg & Co. (1866–1914) ===
Arnhold & Karberg & Co. (德商瑞記洋行) was founded by Jacob Arnhold, a German Jewish businessman, and Peter Karberg, a Danish merchant, as a German-registered trading company in September 1866 on Honam island (the modern day Haizhu District), on the opposite bank of the Pearl River to Canton, where all the foreign offices were then located. The firm relocated to Shamian Island when Britain and France located concessions there in 1859.

Initially the firm operated on a "small scale", but "by perseverance, acumen, and integrity it rapidly increased its business and expanded its sphere." The firm opened its first branch in Hong Kong in 1867, and its next in Shanghai on 1 January 1881. By 1901 the firm had 37 branches throughout China, including branches with European staff in Tianjin, Hankou, Qingdao, Wuhu, Jiujiang, Niuzhuang, Chongqing, and Mukden (Shenyang), while branches with Chinese only staff in Beijing, Jinan, and Jilin, among others. Additionally the firm had "numerous Chinese agencies."

From 1897–1910, at least one of the Arnhold family was chairman of the company's board of directors: Jacob Arnhold (1897–1900), Philipp Arnhold (1900–1905; and 1906–1910); and Harry Edward Arnhold (1905–1906).

In 1908 the chief compradore of Arnold, Karberg was the 58-year-old Woo Chau Chin, who was appointed to that position in 1896, and was assisted by his son, Woo Ton Yin.

The outbreak of World War I in August 1914 had a profound effect on Arnold, Karsberg. Carl Smith explains:

When war was declared between Britain and Germany in August 1914 citizens of enemy countries were placed under parole but in October 1914 new laws were enacted enabling the Hong Kong Government to place German nationals who held reserve status in the military to be interned. Representatives of German businesses in Hong Kong sent a letter dated 30 October to the American Consul General there asking him to submit it to the British authorities. The merchants appealed for a reversal of the orders on the grounds that they had contributed through the years to the economic growth of the colony "While naturally trading for their own benefit, they think that they may justly claim to have contributed in no small way to the development, growth of prosperity of the Colony, and in their capacity as peaceful traders they consider themselves and their businesses a valuable asset to the community It has taken decades of hard work to create such an asset which they consider particularly valuable to the Colony since they have as impartial traders been instrumental to a great extent in attracting to this part business from all quarters of the globe thereby promoting British trade more than that of another nation." As reasonable as this argument might seem to those who could differentiate between trade and politics, it found no sympathetic response among those who were responsible for the defence of the island and the patriotic call of God and King.

Due to hostility to German companies as a consequence of the war, and the seizure of German companies by the British and their allies, Harry Arnhold and his brother, Charles Herbert Arnhold, "advertised themselves out of the well-known Anglo-German concern, Arnhold, Karberg & Co.". Arnhold, Karberg had four partners: the two Arnhold brothers, who held 43% of the shares; Ernest Goetz, a Swiss born German subject; and Max Niclassen, of Berlin, Germany.

=== Messrs. H.E. Arnold (China) (1914–1917) ===
Initially they formed the firm of Messrs. H.E. Arnhold (China).

=== Arnhold Brothers Limited (China) (1917–1919) ===
On 1 October 1917, they incorporated Arnhold Brothers Limited (China), in Hong Kong, under British law, but with headquarters in Shanghai, (which was reconstituted as a British company after 1919. E.D. Sassoon & Co. became the majority shareholder in 1923 after a merger According to Stella Dong, its "most attractive asset was the Cathay Land Company, ownership of which gave Sir Victor control of a number of apartment buildings and a hotel in the International Settlement as well as choice housing estates in the French Concession." Arnhold's served as a front for Sassoon's political interests in the International Settlement.

=== Arnhold & Co. (1919) ===
Harry Edward Arnhold was the initial chairman of Arnhold & Company, a trading company that became a leading distributor of building materials and engineering equipment.

Headquartered in the Arnhold Building at 6 Kiukiang Road, Shanghai until its relocation in 1930 to the third floor of Sassoon House at 1 Nanking Road. Arnhold & Co. flourished until 1949 when, with the change of Government in China, the headquarters relocated to Hong Kong. In 1951, Arnold acquired Lane Crawford and takeover its properties and assets from Matsuzakaya. Mr. Maurice Green who had been associated with the company since the Sassoon takeover, acquired the controlling interest in Arnhold in 1957.

== Activities ==
Arnhold employs over 650 people in Hong Kong and the Mainland. The group owns and operates a stone processing factory in Xiegang Town, Dongguan, Guangdong Province, in southern China. Sales of the Arnhold Group are derived from two main businesses areas – building materials and engineering equipment. The group services an extensive network of customers in Hong Kong, Macau and the Mainland including property developers, contractors, utility companies and government departments.

== See also ==
- Harry Edward Arnhold
- List of companies listed on the Hong Kong Stock Exchange
