= Ersatz Zenta-class cruiser =

Cancelled light cruiser class of the Austro-Hungarian Navy

- Line-drawing of the Ersatz Zenta design

Class overview
- Name: Ersatz Zenta-class cruiser (Note: For political and traditional purposes, the Marinekommandant designated all of his proposed ships to the Austrian and Hungarian parliaments with the prefix "Ersatz" ("replacement"). Once a ship was launched, it would be formally named. As the cruisers were never laid down, much less launched, their class was never given a proper name. See Sondhaus, p. 168)
- Builders: Contract awarded to Ganz—Danubius, construction never started
- Operators: Austro-Hungarian Navy
- Preceded by: Novara class
- Succeeded by: None
- Built: 1914–1917 (Projected)
- Planned: 3
- Cancelled: 3

General characteristics (original design)
- Type: Light cruiser
- Displacement: Design: 4,950 t (4,870 long tons; 5,460 short tons); Full load: 5,611 t (5,522 long tons; 6,185 short tons)
- Length: 151.2 m (496 ft) lwl; 153.1 m (502 ft) loa
- Beam: 13.7 m (45 ft)
- Draft: 6.4 m (21 ft)
- Installed power: 16 × Yarrow boilers; 40,000 shp (30,000 kW)
- Propulsion: 2 × AEG-Curtis steam turbines; 2 × screws
- Speed: 30.1 knots (55.7 km/h; 34.6 mph)
- Armament: 14 × 12 cm (4.7 in) 45-cal. guns; 1 × 47 mm (1.9 in) 44-cal. gun; 1 × 66 mm (2.6 in) 18-cal. gun; 2 × 533 mm (21 in) torpedo tubes
- Armor: Belt: 20 mm (0.79 in); Deck: 38 mm (1.5 in)

General characteristics (1915 version)
- Speed: 29 to 30 knots (54 to 56 km/h; 33 to 35 mph)
- Armament: 2 × 19 cm (7.5 in) 45-cal. guns; 6–8 × 15 cm (5.9 in) 50-cal. guns; 2–4 × 9 cm (3.5 in) 45-cal. guns; 2 × 533 mm torpedo tubes
- Armor: Belt: 120 to 150 mm (4.7 to 5.9 in)

The Ersatz Zenta class was a class of three planned light cruisers of the Austro-Hungarian Navy designed in the mid-1910s as part of a naval expansion program passed during a period of rising tensions in Europe. Several designs were proposed, including options for a so-called "yacht cruiser" that was to have been used by Archduke Franz Ferdinand, the heir to the Austro-Hungarian throne. The design that was ultimately selected called for ships that were capable of speeds of at least 30 knots (56 km/h; 35 mph), with an armament of fourteen 12-centimeter (4.7 in) guns and a thin armored belt that was 20 millimeters (0.79 in) thick.

The Austro-Hungarian Navy followed the traditional German custom of not naming the new ships until they were formally launched. As a result, the Navy only referred to them as "replacements" for the Zenta-class cruisers. The ships, only ever given the contract names "Cruiser K", "Cruiser L", and "Cruiser M", were scheduled to be laid down beginning in July 1914. The assassination of Archduke Franz Ferdinand the month before and the resulting July Crisis, which culminated in the start of World War I on 28 July, led the navy to suspend all new ship construction projects. Work on a revised version of the design began in December 1915, but shortages of material and a lack of skilled shipyard workers meant that the new design would be completed on paper only. None of the three ships were ever laid down and the project was abandoned after Austria-Hungary's defeat at the end of the war.

== Background ==
The Ersatz Zenta-class cruisers were intended to be constructed at a time when Austro-Hungary was engaged in a naval arms race with its nominal ally, Italy. Italy's Regia Marina was considered the most-important naval power in the region which Austria-Hungary measured itself against, often unfavorably. In 1909, the Austro-Hungarian Navy had 9 cruisers of various types in commission, while Italy had 14. The disparity between the two navies was even greater when taking into account tonnage. Italian cruisers had a total tonnage of 74,474 metric tons (73,298 long tons; 82,094 short tons), while Austria-Hungary's cruisers only had a total tonnage of 35,719 metric tons (35,155 long tons; 39,373 short tons). This gave Italy a more than two to one advantage among cruisers. By 1914, the disparity in numbers and tonnage among cruisers had only grown, with Italy having 20 more cruisers than Austria-Hungary with a tonnage advantage of 136,053 metric tons (133,904 long tons; 149,973 short tons) to 43,990 metric tons (43,300 long tons; 48,490 short tons).

Naval strength of Italy and Austria-Hungary in May 1914
Type	Italy		Austria-Hungary		Italian/Austro-Hungarian tonnage ratio
Type	Number	Tonnage	Number	Tonnage	Italian/Austro-Hungarian tonnage ratio
Dreadnoughts	3	67,676 metric tons (66,607 long tons; 74,600 short tons)	3	60,042 metric tons (59,094 long tons; 66,185 short tons)	1.1:1
Other battleships	8 (Note: This figure excludes 6 obsolete battleships which had a combined displacement of 76,166 metric tons (74,963 long tons; 83,959 short tons).)	98,564 metric tons (97,007 long tons; 108,648 short tons)	12	114,840 metric tons (113,030 long tons; 126,590 short tons)	0.9:1
Armoured cruisers	11	86,602 metric tons (85,234 long tons; 95,462 short tons)	3	18,800 metric tons (18,500 long tons; 20,700 short tons)	4.6:1
Torpedo cruisers	6	5,030 metric tons (4,950 long tons; 5,540 short tons)	2	3,020 metric tons (2,970 long tons; 3,330 short tons)	1.6:1
Protected cruisers	10	31,374 metric tons (30,878 long tons; 34,584 short tons)	5	15,050 metric tons (14,810 long tons; 16,590 short tons)	2.1:1
Scout cruisers	5	13,047 metric tons (12,841 long tons; 14,382 short tons)	2	7,080 metric tons (6,970 long tons; 7,800 short tons)	1.8:1
Destroyers	31	121,514 metric tons (119,595 long tons; 133,946 short tons)	18	10,860 metric tons (10,690 long tons; 11,970 short tons)	11.1:1
High seas torpedo craft	29	6,221 metric tons (6,123 long tons; 6,857 short tons)	25	4,000 metric tons (3,900 long tons; 4,400 short tons)	1.6:1
Coastal torpedo craft	41	5,009 metric tons (4,930 long tons; 5,521 short tons)	29	2,920 metric tons (2,870 long tons; 3,220 short tons)	1.7:1
Submarines	20	4,427 metric tons (4,357 long tons; 4,880 short tons)	6	1,412 metric tons (1,390 long tons; 1,556 short tons)	3.1:1
Total	173	330,464 metric tons (325,245 long tons; 364,274 short tons)	105	238,064 metric tons (234,304 long tons; 262,421 short tons)	1.4:1

== Proposals ==
The Bosnian Crisis of 1908, the Italo-Turkish War of 1911–1912 and the Balkan Wars of 1912–1913 significantly increased tensions in Europe, which saw the dismemberment of large swaths of the Ottoman Empire. These conflicts provided the background for a major naval expansion program in Austria-Hungary, which received broad support in the Austrian and Hungarian parliaments. Admiral Anton Haus, then the Commanders-in-Chief of the Navy (German: Marinekommandant) used the growing risk of war with Austria-Hungary's nominal ally, Italy, to push his construction program. On 5 October 1913, Haus presented a new five-year construction program which called for four superdreadnoughts to replace the aging Monarch-class coastal defense ships, as well as three scout cruisers, six destroyers, two river monitors, and one supply ship. The scout cruisers in this plan would eventually form the design of the Ersatz Zenta-class cruiser. Haus estimated the cost of this program to be over 420 million krone. As part of its construction program, the navy projected to build three cruisers, and adopted a secret construction schedule on 12 January 1914, which called for the first vessel to be laid down on 1 July 1914, followed by the other two on 1 July 1915. The first ship was projected to be completed by 31 December 1917, with the second and third following on 31 December 1918. By 1919, all three ships were expected to be complete and commissioned into the Austro-Hungarian Navy.

The Ersatz Zenta-class cruisers were intended to play a diverse role in Austro-Hungarian naval policy. Two of the ships were intended to be assigned to the navy's Active Squadron alongside the Ersatz Monarch-class battleships, the Tegetthoff-class battleships, the cruisers Sankt Georg and Admiral Spaun, two Kaiser Franz Joseph I-class cruisers, two Zenta-class cruisers, the Tátra-class destroyers, 24 250 t (250-long-ton; 280-short-ton) torpedo boats, one torpedo depot ship, and six minesweepers. The remaining Ersatz Zenta-class cruiser would be a part of the Reserve Squadron, which was to be made up of the Radetzky-class battleships, the Erzherzog Karl-class battleships, the Novara-class cruisers, six Huszár-class destroyers, and 12 Kaiman-class torpedo boats. Each ship in the class was designated to replace an existing cruiser from the older Zenta class. "Cruiser K" was intended to replace Zenta, "Cruiser L" would replace Aspern, and "Cruiser M" was to replace Szigetvár.

Preliminary design work on what became the Ersatz Zenta class began in May 1913, before the budgetary debate had begun. The Marinetechnische Komitee (MTK—Naval Technical Committee) issued a series of requirements for the new cruiser: displacement would be in the range of 4,500 to 4,800 metric tons (4,400 to 4,700 long tons; 5,000 to 5,300 short tons), speed would be 29.5 to 30 knots (54.6 to 55.6 km/h; 33.9 to 34.5 mph) from steam turbines, with a radius of action of 1,200 nautical miles (2,200 km; 1,400 mi) at a speed of 24 knots (44 km/h; 28 mph). The ship would carry no armor protection, and the armament would consist of either twelve 12-centimeter (4.7 in) 45-caliber (cal.) guns and two 9 cm (3.5 in) anti-aircraft guns all singly mounted, or fourteen of the 12 cm guns and four 45 cm (17.7 in) torpedo tubes in single or double mounts.

During the design process, Archduke Franz Ferdinand of Austria, the heir to the Austro-Hungarian throne, requested that one of the new cruisers be built as a "yacht cruiser". The designers considered two options to accommodate Ferdinand's request, the first with a deck house on the stern in place of some of the guns; in the event of war, the deck house could be removed and the guns installed, and the second wherein the ship would not be readily converted and would only be used for auxiliary roles during a conflict. In either case, the maximum speed for the so-called "yacht cruiser" was to be 24 knots (44 km/h; 28 mph), with no armor protection, and it was to resemble the other two ships as closely as possible.

On 12 September 1913, the navy began the design competition, soliciting offers from several different shipyards. The designer of the winning bid was to receive a prize of 2,450 krone and the runner-up would receive 1,750 krone. Franz Pitzinger, the chief constructor of the Austro-Hungarian navy, was occupied with the design of the Ersatz Monarch-class battleship, allowing one of the private firms an opportunity to design the new class of cruisers. Two naval engineers, Silvius Morin of the MTK and Johann Fiala, who oversaw the construction of the cruiser Admiral Spaun at the Pola Naval Arsenal, submitted the two most serious proposals. Fiala submitted two variants, Ia and IIb, along with a third for the "yacht cruiser" that was considered separately during the design competition. His third design, Ic, was identical in dimensions to the other two proposals, though it incorporated an armored belt of 60-millimeter (2.4 in) Krupp cemented steel. While busy with the Ersatz Monarch project, Pitzinger nevertheless submitted a design by the deadline.

=== Designs ===
Design	Displacement	Armament	Propulsion	Length	Beam	Draft
Morin's design	5,770 t (5,680 long tons; 6,360 short tons)	14 × 12 cm 50-cal. guns	2 AEG turbines 41,000 shaft horsepower (31,000 kW); 30.2 knots (55.9 km/h; 34.8 mph); 2 × screws	151.2 m (496 ft 1 in)	13.8 m (45 ft 3 in)	4.82 m (15 ft 10 in)
Fiala's design Ia	5,711 t (5,621 long tons; 6,295 short tons)	14 × 12 cm 45-cal. guns	3 Melms-Pfenniger turbines 42,000 shp (31,000 kW); 30.5 knots (56.5 km/h; 35.1 mph); 3 × screws	151.2 m (496 ft 1 in)	13.7 m (44 ft 11 in)	4.97 m (16 ft 4 in)
Fiala's design Ib	5,611 t (5,522 long tons; 6,185 short tons)	14 × 12 cm 45-cal. guns	2 AEG turbines 38,000 shp (28,000 kW); 30.1 knots (55.7 km/h; 34.6 mph); 2 × screws	151.2 m (496 ft 1 in)	13.7 m (44 ft 11 in)	4.97 m (16 ft 4 in)
Pitzinger's design	4,500 t (4,400 long tons; 5,000 short tons)	6 × 15 cm (5.9 in) 50-cal. guns 2 × 9 cm (3.5 in) guns 2 × 47 mm (1.9 in) guns	2 turbines 36,000 shp (27,000 kW); 30 knots (56 km/h; 35 mph); 2 × screws	150 m (490 ft)	14 m (45 ft)	4.6 m (15 ft)

=== Selection and approval ===
On 14 April 1914, the navy ruled out Morin's design. Fiala's Ib design was the version chosen, though the navy requested several alterations. These included lengthening the forecastle by 16 frames to increase space for crew berths and the addition of a 20 mm (0.79 in) thick armored belt, which would extend from 2 m (6 ft 7 in) above the waterline to 1.2 m (3 ft 11 in) below the line. The changes caused the displacement to rise by 154.3 t (151.9 long tons; 170.1 short tons). A four-shaft arrangement was also proposed as a possibility. The changes requested by the navy evidenced an evolution in Austro-Hungarian cruiser designs away from the unarmored scout cruisers of the earlier Admiral Spaun and Novara types toward modern light cruisers suited to fleet operations.

Funding for the three cruisers were approved on 18 April 1914 as part of Haus' 1915–1919 naval construction program. It was scheduled to come into force on 1 July. The entire project, which called for four battleships, three cruisers, and six destroyers, had a final cost of 426.8–427.8 million krone. (Note: There is some debate over the exact size of the budget for Haus' 1915–1919 naval program. Vego claims the budget was 427 million krone. Sondhaus states the budget was 426.8 million. Sieche writes that the budget was 427.8 million.) On 16 May, the navy informed the shipbuilding firms Stabilimento Tecnico Triestino (STT), Ganz-Danubius, CNT Monfalcone, and San Rocco AG to submit tenders to build the ships, with a deadline of 5 July. At the same time, Fiala issued a request for a 40,000 shp (30,000 kW) propulsion system to STT, Ganz-Danubius, and Breitfeld & Danek. On 28 May, the navy secured approval for constructing the three cruisers. On 2 August, days after the outbreak of World War I, the navy awarded Ganz-Danubius with the contract to build the three cruisers. It had settled on a two-shaft arrangement with AEG-Curtis turbines license-built by Ganz—Danubius.

The "yacht cruiser" project was handled separately by the navy; Morin's design was again ruled out, now because he had focused his design too much on the yacht aspect of the vessel, neglecting its military qualities. Again, the navy chose Fiala's proposal, named IIb, as the basis for the "yacht cruiser", citing its heavier armament and higher speed, compared to Morin's vessel. But no final design had been approved by the time Franz Ferdinand was assassinated in Sarajevo on 28 June 1914; with the death of the man who had requested the "yacht cruiser", the navy no longer had a reason to pursue the project.

== Characteristics ==
As adopted, the Ersatz Zenta-class ships were to have been 151.2 m (496 ft) long at the waterline and 153.1 m (502 ft) long overall. Their beam was to have been 13.7 m (45 ft). The class had a design displacement of 4,950 t (4,870 long tons; 5,460 short tons), with a full load displacement of 5,611 t (5,522 long tons; 6,185 short tons); at deep load, their draft was to be 6.4 m (21 ft).

The ships were to be powered by two AEG-Curtis turbines, each rated at 20,000 shp (15,000 kW), meeting the required 40,000 shp output. Steam was provided by sixteen Yarrow boilers, eight of which were to burn coal and the other eight to burn fuel oil. Top speed was to have been 30.1 knots (55.7 km/h; 34.6 mph). Fuel storage capacity and thus cruising range are unknown.

The ships retained the fourteen 12 cm 45-cal. guns of Fiala's design, and received a 47 mm (1.9 in) 44-cal. gun and a 66 mm (2.6 in) 18-cal. landing gun in addition. The 12 cm guns had reached the prototype stage only by the outbreak of World War I saw the ships' cancellation, so no performance data exists. A longer-barreled 50-cal. version was also prepared for possible use aboard the Ersatz Zenta class, but it too did not see completion. They were also to carry a pair of 533 mm (21 in) torpedo tubes in deck-mounted launchers, which were placed amidships. Armor protection consisted of the 20 mm belt, along with a 38 mm (1.5 in) thick armor deck.

== Ships ==
Name	Cost	Contract awarded to	Laid down	Scheduled launch	Building time	Fate
"Cruiser K" (German: "Kreuzer K")	15,450,000 krone per ship, 46,350,000 krone in total	Ganz-Danubius, Fiume	1 July 1914	31 December 1916	30 months	Construction suspended until after the war. Canceled upon Austria-Hungary's collapse in 1918.
"Cruiser L" (German: "Kreuzer L")	15,450,000 krone per ship, 46,350,000 krone in total	Ganz-Danubius, Fiume	1 July 1915	31 December 1917	30 months	Construction suspended until after the war. Canceled upon Austria-Hungary's collapse in 1918.
"Cruiser M" (German: "Kreuzer M")	15,450,000 krone per ship, 46,350,000 krone in total	Ganz-Danubius, Fiume	1 July 1915	31 December 1917	30 months	Construction suspended until after the war. Canceled upon Austria-Hungary's collapse in 1918.

== Construction and cancellation ==
Each ship in the class, referred to in the budget as "Cruiser K", "Cruiser L", and "Cruiser M", was to cost 15.45 million krone and be constructed within 30 months. "Cruiser K" was expected to be laid down on 1 July 1914, followed by "Cruiser L" and "Cruiser M" on 1 July 1915. "Cruiser K"'s expected completion date was listed 31 December 1916 in the budget, while "Cruiser L" and "Cruiser M" were both expected to be finished on 31 December 1917. All three ships were to have completed their sea trials and been commissioned into the Austro-Hungarian Navy by 1919. With the assassination of Archduke Franz Ferdinand on 28 June 1914 however, construction on the first ship was halted just days before its hull was scheduled to be laid down. With the outbreak of World War I on 28 July, construction never began on the three cruisers. Indeed, the navy refused to use part of the war appropriations passed under the naval expansion budget to fund construction of the vessels, preferring to await the end of what was expected to be a short war, and then use the additional wartime funds to build improved ships. The navy mistakenly assumed no new projects could be completed before the war would be over, and any wartime experience would necessarily have to be incorporated in any future design.

In August 1914, the Austro-Hungarian government suspended all contracts which had been awarded as part of Haus' naval program, including the three ships of the Ersatz Zenta class. In October 1914, the Hungarian finance ministry attempted to cancel the projects outright. While the navy was unwilling to begin work on the ships until after the war, Haus objected to a cancellation of the project and in February 1915 a compromise was reached where construction would be halted until after the war, but the project would be suspended, not formally canceled. Instead, in late 1914, a scale model of the design was taken to the Tiergarten in Berlin, where the Königlichen Versuchsanstalt für Wasserbau und Schiffbau (Royal Research Institute for Hydraulic Engineering and Shipbuilding) had testing facilities, since the Austro-Hungarian Navy had no such capability.

While Fiala remained at STT, he continued to refine the design. On 14 May 1915, nine days before Italy declared war on Austria-Hungary, Fiala was recalled to the MTK. He continued to independently work on the cruiser project as late as 14 December that year. On 25 December, he was officially ordered to prepare a revised design with the following characteristics: armament was to be increased to two 19 cm (7.5 in) 45-cal. guns in a twin gun turret, supported by six to eight 15 cm (5.9 in) 50-cal. guns in single mounts and two 9 cm (3.5 in) 45-cal. anti-aircraft guns; the 533 mm torpedo tubes would be retained. Speed was to be 29 to 30 knots, with a cruising radius sufficient to allow operations in the Mediterranean Sea. The new ships would also incorporate a 150 mm (5.9 in) thick armored belt.

The new project was simply a design study only, since the majority of the shipyard workers had already been drafted into the Austro-Hungarian Army and material shortages prevented any actual work from being done anyway. It nevertheless represented the lessons learned from the first year of the war, including the fact that the 12 cm guns used on earlier Austro-Hungarian cruisers was wholly insufficient, as exemplified by the loss of the German cruiser Emden to the 6-inch (152 mm) gun armed HMAS Sydney in 1914. The lack of shipyard workers was itself a result of the navy's decision at the start of the war to stop new construction; since the shipyards no longer needed large work forces, those men could be used in the army.
