= Havilland de Sausmarez =

British judge (1861–1941)

Sir Havilland de Sausmarez
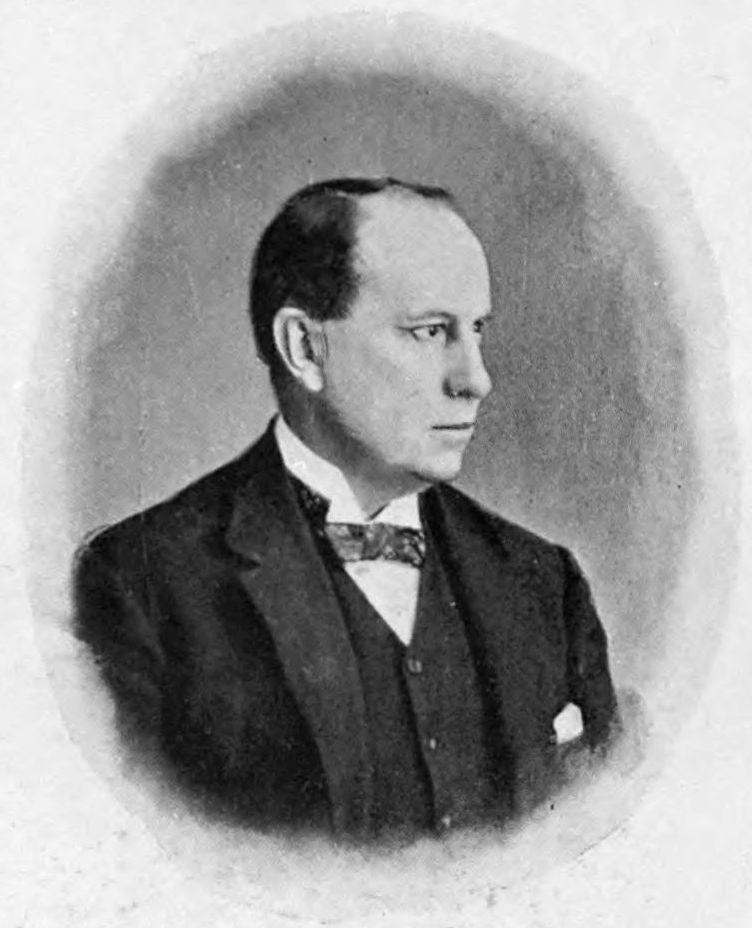
- Sausmarez in 1908

Judge, British Supreme Consular Court at Constantinople
- In office 1903–1905

Chief Judge, British Supreme Court for China
- In office 1905–1921
- Preceded by: Hiram Shaw Wilkinson
- Succeeded by: Skinner Turner

Personal details
- Born: 30 May 1861
- Died: 5 March 1941 (aged 79)
- Spouse: Annie Mann

Sir Havilland Walter de Sausmarez, 1st Baronet (30 May 1861 – 5 March 1941) was a judge of various British colonial and consular courts in Africa and Asia, the Ottoman Empire and China. His last judicial position before retirement was chief judge of the British Supreme Court for China. He later served as bailiff of Guernsey.

== Early life ==
Sausmarez was born on 30 May 1861, the son of the reverend Havilland de Sausmarez by his marriage to Anne Priaulx Walters. He was a scholar at Westminster, where he had a fine athletic record, including being Head of the Water. From there he went to Trinity College, Cambridge, where he continued his career as an athlete and graduated BA in 1883. In 1881, while still at Cambridge, he was admitted to the Inner Temple. He was called to the Bar in November 1884. He practised as a barrister in England on the Southern Eastern Circuit and then moved to Africa, where he began to practise in Lagos, Nigeria, in 1891. He was acting Queen's Advocate of the Colony of Lagos from June 1891 to January 1892.

== Judicial appointments ==
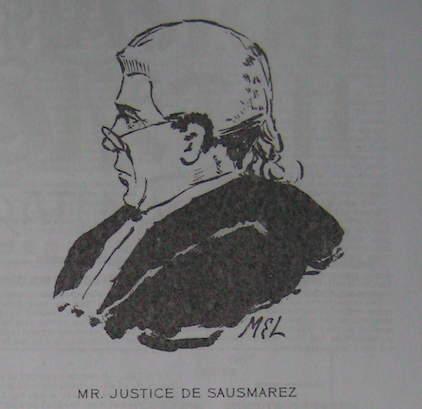
Caricature of Sausmarez from the Eastern Sketch

De Sausmarez joined the Foreign Office Judicial Service when he was appointed a consul in Zanzibar in June 1892. He held the office of assistant judge of the Consular Court in Zanzibar from 1893 to 1897 and then held the office of assistant judge of the Supreme Consular Court for the Ottoman Empire between December 1897 and 1903. He was appointed judge of the Supreme Consular Court for the Ottoman Empire in 1903 and served until 1905. He was knighted in 1905.

In 1905, de Sausmarez was appointed judge of the British Supreme Court for China and Corea (based in Shanghai). He was knighted in the same year. He served in that position until 1921. By virtue of his position as judge of the Supreme Court at Shanghai, he served as president of the full court of the Supreme Court of Hong Kong from 1910 to 1920. The ordinance creating the full court provided that the most senior judge on the bench would be president of the full court when it sat.

== Return to Guernsey ==
Sausmarez retired in 1920 and was succeeded by Skinner Turner. After leaving Shanghai, Sausmarez took up his residence at the Sausmarez Manor in Guernsey. As seigneur of the manor of Sausmarez and as chatelain of Jerbourg, he held the titular office of third cup-bearer to the Duke of Normandy, which was held by his forebears for centuries. In 1922 he was appointed bailiff of Guernsey, a position he maintained until 1929.

His wife, Annie, Lady de Sausmarez, was a philanthropist. Between 1914 and 1919, Sausmarez served as president of the British Women's Work Association in Shanghai. She organized the war effort to supply British troops with bandages and clothing. For her service to the war effort, she was honoured as a Dame Grand Cross of the Order of the British Empire (GBE) in 1920.

== De Sausmarez Baronetcy ==
The de Sausmarez Baronetcy, of Jerburg in Guernsey, was created in the 1928 Birthday Honours for Havilland de Sausmarez. He died on 5 March 1941 without issue, and the title became extinct upon his death.

Baronetage of the United Kingdom
New creation	Baronet (of Jedburg); 1928–1941	Extinct
