= China Society of London =

The China Society of London (also known as the China Society) was an organization founded in 1889 to promote British interest in Chinese cultural and social affairs. It hosted lectures by distinguished speakers, published academic papers, and co-organized major exhibitions of Chinese art.

== History ==
The Society was founded by Byron Brenan, former British Consul-General in Shanghai, after his retirement to the UK, to promote British interest in Chinese cultural and social affairs (rather than trade). It was officially endorsed by the Guangxu Emperor of China, with a gift in 1908 of a 5,000 fascicle set of the Imperial Encyclopedia (欽定古今圖書集成 Qin ding gujin tushu jicheng), which is now on loan in the Cambridge University Library. Its headquarters were at 31B Torrington Square, London WC1.

Presidents of the China Society included Major-General Sir Neill Malcolm, Colonel Kenneth Cantlie, Michael Loewe. Lionel Giles was "the last survivor of the founders of the China Society and for half a century he took a leading part in all the society's activities”

== Exhibitions ==
The Society collaborated in presenting major exhibitions of Chinese art, including the “Exhibition of Modern Chinese Painting”, co-organized with the China Association, and displayed at the New Burlington Galleries, London, in 1935.

== Selected Publications ==
The Society organized regular academic lectures, often publishing the transcripts, initially as books, and from 1942 onwards, in the China Society Occasional Papers series.

- 1912 W. Perceval Yetts, Symbolism in Chinese art – lecture, 18 Jan 1912
- 1912 Oliver Bainbridge, The Heart of China - lecture, 30 October 1912
- 1913 Office-bearers, Statutes, Papers read, Publications, Members
- 1916 Laurence Binyon, The Art of Asia - lecture, 24 Nov 1915
- 1917 William McLeish, Life in a China Outport
- 1935 The Modern Chinese Literary Movement - A cultural review delivered during the lead-up to the International Exhibition of Chinese Art
- 1936 Joseph Hackin et al., Studies in Chinese art and some Indian influence, lectures delivered in connection with the International Exhibition of Chinese Art at the Royal Academy
- 1940 W. Perceval Yetts, Sinological Series 2.
- 1941 Harold John Timperley, Some Contrasts between China and Japan in the Light of History
- 1942 W. Perceval Yetts, An-Yang: A Retrospect (Occasional Paper 2)
- 1943 W. Perceval Yetts, The Legend of Confucius (Occasional Paper 5)
- 1944 Lionel Giles, Six Centuries in Tunhuang
- The Chinese Core of Structural Philosophy
- 1945 Fan Cunzhong / T.C. Fan, Dr. Johnson and Chinese Culture (Occasional Paper 6)
- 1947 Herbert Chatley, The origin and diffusion of Chinese culture – lecture, 29 Oct 1947
- 1948 The Rise of the Dragon in Chinese Art
- 1952 Henry McAleavy, Wang T'ao: The Life and Writings of a Displaced Person - lecture, 22 May 1952 (Occasional Paper 7)
- 1955 James Jo-Yü Liu, Elizabethan and Yuan. A brief comparison of some conventions in poetic drama – lecture, 19 Jan 1954 (Occasional Paper 8)
- 1956 Chêng Tê-k'un (Zheng Dekun)The Religious Outlook of the Chinese (Occasional Paper 9)
- 1958 Joseph Needham, Chinese Astronomy and the Jesuit Mission: An Encounter of Cultures (Occasional Paper 10)
- 1958 "West" and "East" and the Chou Dynasty (Occasional Paper 11)
- 1965 Michael Loewe, Military Operations in the Han Period Michael Loewe (Occasional Paper 13)
- 1965 Maurice Freedman, The Chinese in South-East Asia: a longer view – lecture, 17 Jun 1964 (Occasional Paper 14)
- 1965 Nine Dragon Screen – being reprints of nine addresses and papers presented to the China Society, 1909-1945
- 1966 Bernard Martin, Sun Yat-Sen's Vision for China (Occasional Paper 15)
- 1969 Michael C. Gillett Some Walks Along the China-Burma Frontier (OCcasional Paper 16)
- 1974 Charles R. Bawden, Some Remarks on the Relationship Between China and Mongolia (Occasional Paper 17)
- 1976 Denis Twitchett, The Birth of the Chinese Meritocracy: Bureaucrats and Examinations in T'ang China (Occasional Paper 18)
- 1974 Joseph Francis Ford, The Local Histories of Yün-nan (Occasional Paper 19)
- n.d. Arthur Cooper, The Creation of the Chinese Script (Occasional Paper 20)
- 1981 Lt.-Col. Kenneth Cantlie, The Railways of China (Occasional Paper 21)
- 1983 Joseph Francis Ford, An Account of English, 1895-1896 (Occasional Paper 22)
- 1984 Austin Seckerson, The History of the China Society
- 1984 Walter G.C. Graham, China Through One Pair of Eyes. Reminiscences of a Consular Officer 1929-1950 (Occasional Paper 23)
- 1985 Evelyn R. White, South of the Clouds: Yunnan and the Salween Front, 1944: Memories of a British Nursing Sister (Occasional Paper 24)
- 1987 Michael Loewe, The Origins and Development of Chinese Encyclopaedias (Occasional Paper 25)
- 1992 Robert Bickers, Changing Shanghai's “mind”: publicity, reform and the British in Shanghai, 1928-1931 – based on a lecture to the Society on 20 Mar 1991 (Occasional Paper 26)
