= Capitol Theatre, Shanghai =

Building in Shanghai, China

Coordinates: 31°14′43″N 121°28′59″E

The Capitol Building
- 光陆大楼
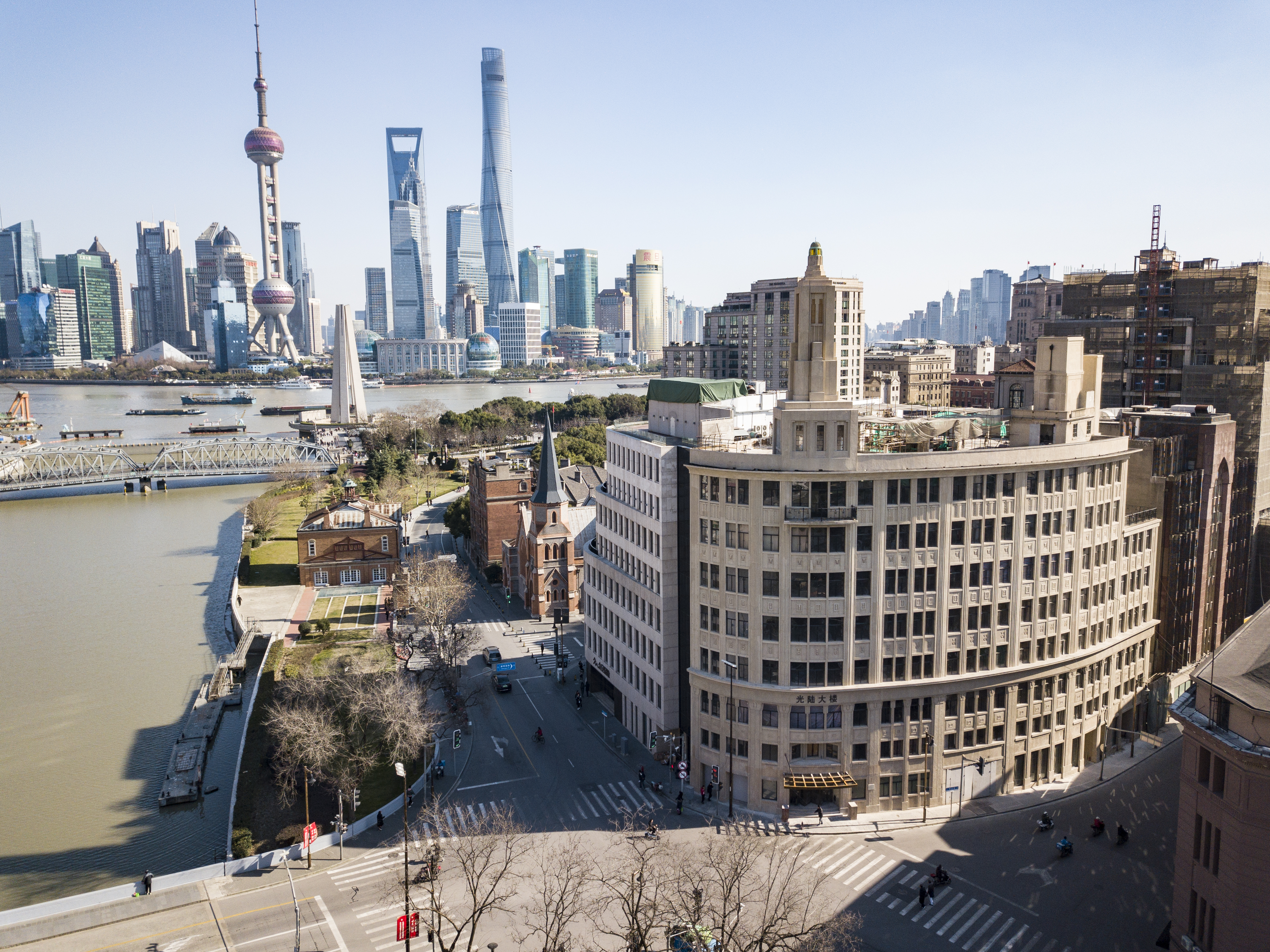
- The Capitol Building and Lujiazui

General information
- Status: List of outstanding historic buildings of Shanghai
- Type: Multi-floor urban building
- Location: No.146, Huqiu Rd, Huangpu District, Shanghai, China
- Construction started: 1925
- Construction stopped: 1928

Technical details
- Material: Reinforced concrete

Design and construction
- Architect: Charles Henry Gonda

The Capitol Theatre Building, is located at No. 146, Huqiu Road, Huangpu District, Shanghai, at the southern end of Zhapu Road Bridge near the banks of the Suzhou Creek. Capitol Theatre was built in 1928. The ground floor used to be the Capitol Theatre while the upper floors were offices and apartments. In 1994, the Capitol Theatre Building was selected to be one of the list of outstanding historic buildings of Shanghai.

== History ==
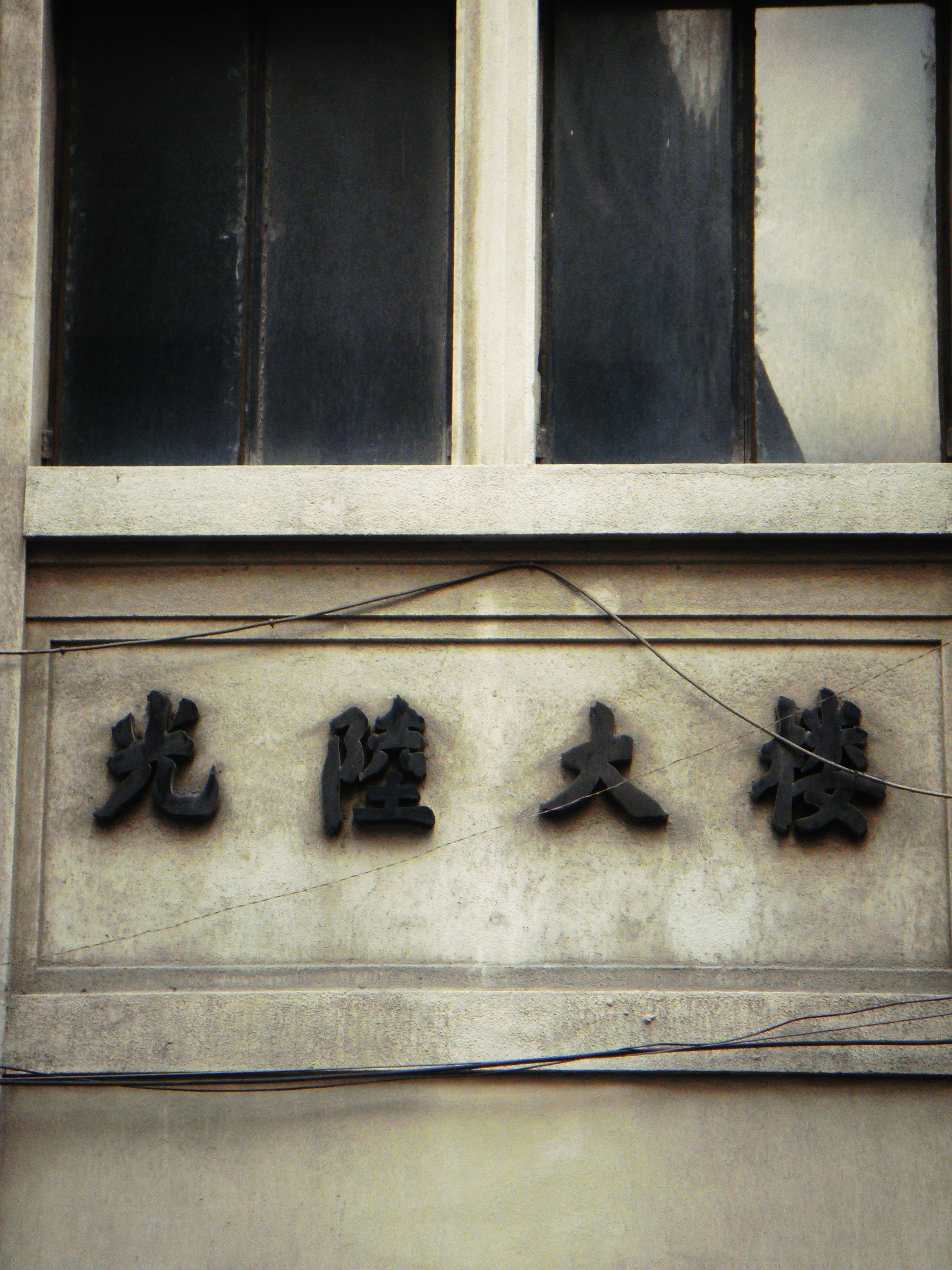
Nameplate of The Capitol Theatre Building

Huqiu Road's original name was Museum Road (博物院路 Bówùyuàn Lù), after one of the earliest museums in China, at the Royal Asiatic Society's building in Shanghai. At that time, Museum Road was the center of Shanghai culture. The British diaspora organized a drama club called 'Friends and Drama' (话剧票友), staging European and American dramas. However, the drama club caught fire and burned down, and the British diaspora decided to rebuild a more luxurious theatre. In 1925, funded by a British firm, a building hosting a theatre, offices and apartments was designed by Hungary architect Charles Henry Gonda. At that time, this "Paris style" building was rare in Shanghai and even in China. At the same time, it was Shanghai's first theatre placed inside a building. On February 25, 1928, the building was officially named Capitol Theatre Building, and the theatre was officially named Capitol Theatre. On that day, the European movie Casanova (光陆大楼) became the ever first movie played in Capitol Theatre.

The Capitol Theatre mainly ran British and American films, including some western musicals. In June 1929, the Capitol Theatre was acquired by the America business 'East Art Firm' (美商远东游艺公司). Film projectors were added at the same time. The theatre signed a contract with Paramount Pictures Corporation, and became the first theatre for Paramount films in Shanghai.

At that time, Capitol Theater, The Grand Theatre, The Metropol Cinema, The Athena Cinema, Olympic were the top theaters in Shanghai. However, movie tickets at the Capitol Theater were more expensive than the others, for example, Hollywood movie tickets would generally cost 0.6 silver dollar (银圆), but 1 silver dollar at the Capitol. The Capitol Theater is located near the Former Consulate-General of the United Kingdom, Shanghai, the dorms for the senior staff of the foreign trading companies, and the Former Foreign YMCA Building.

In 1933, The Capitol Theater was acquired by the Lyceum Theatre and became Lyceum second-run film screening venue.

In 1941, the outbreak of the Pacific War, Capitol Theatre was forcibly taken over by the Reorganized National Government of the Republic of China and renamed The Culture Theatre. In 1945, the US military club stationed in Shanghai occupied the Culture Theatre. In 1953, the theatre was renamed Shuguang Theatre, and gradually began specializing in News reports and documentaries. The Capitol Building is part of The Bund which was renovated in 2009.

== Architecture ==
The Capitol Building was designed by Hungarian architect Charles Henry Gonda. The building covers and area of 923 square meters. The total floor space is 7129 square meters. The main section of the building is 8 floors high, and some areas are 6 floors high. The Capitol Building is constructed of reinforced concrete with a fan-shaped floor plan and a tower. The overall style is Art Deco. The Capitol Theatre is at the bottom two floors of the building, with 730 available seats with private boxes along two sides.
