= John Fitzgerald Brenan =

British diplomat (1883–1953)

Sir John Fitzgerald Brenan
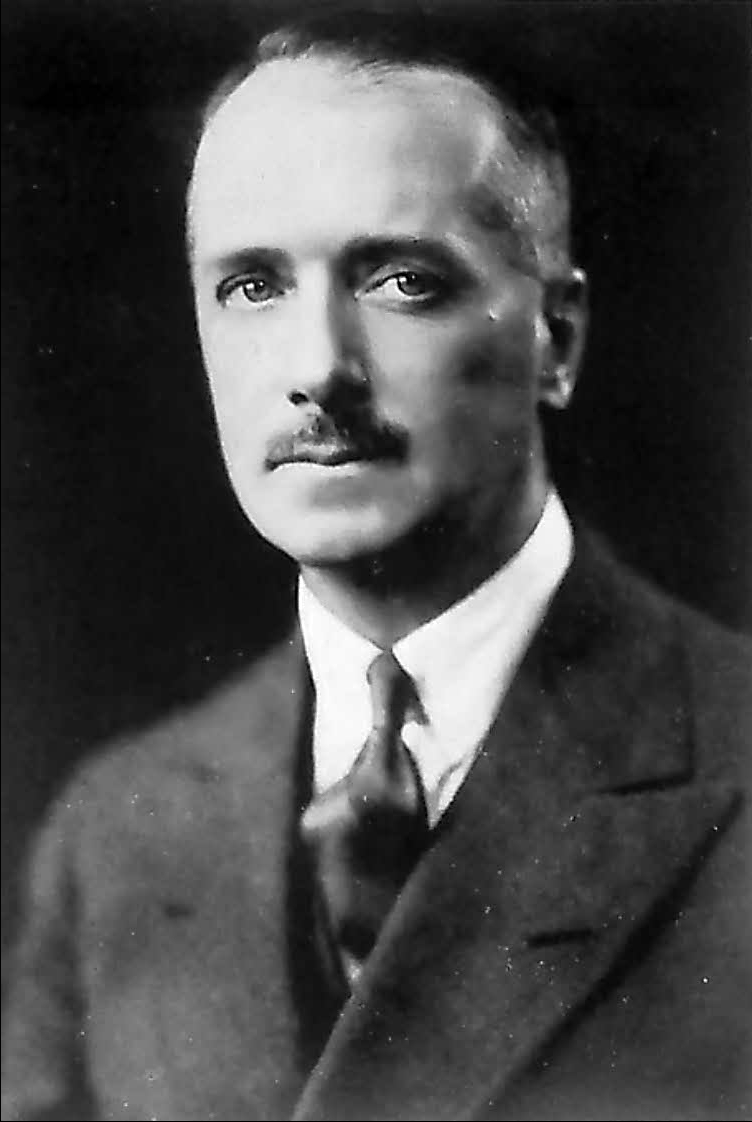

British Consul General, Shanghai
- In office 4 April 1930 – 21 March 1937
- Preceded by: Sir Sidney Barton
- Succeeded by: Sir Herbert Phillips

Personal details
- Born: 1 July 29, 1883 Newchwang, China
- Died: January 11, 1953 (aged 69) Royal Tunbridge Wells, England

Sir John Fitzgerald Brenan KCMG (29 July 1883 to 11 January 1953), was a British diplomat in China who served as British Consul General in Shanghai in the 1930s.

Brenan was from a family of diplomats with English and Irish heritage. He was born in 1883 in Newchwang (now Yingkou), China. His father, Edward Vincent Brenan, worked for many years in Chinese Maritime Customs Service. His uncle Byron Brenan was also the British Consul General in Shanghai from 1899 to 1901. His brothers were also diplomats.

Brenan joined the UK Foreign Office in 1903 and transferred to China in 1905 after two years in Siam. He then served in Tianjin, Fuzhou, Beijing (then called Beiping), Nanjing and Shanghai and other places. He qualified as a barrister in the Middle Temple in 1913. He went to Europe with Chinese Labour Corps during World War I from 1917 to 1918.

Between 1926 and 1929, he served as British Consul General in Canton (now Guangzhou). He was involved in seeking to resolve the Canton–Hong Kong strike and worked actively to improve the bilateral relations between China and Britain and China and Hong Kong. He arranged for the Governor of Hong Kong, Sir Cecil Clementi's official visit to Canton in 1928.

Between 1930 and 1937, he served as British Consul General in Shanghai. He took a position of goodwill towards China and helped mediate during the 1932 January 28 incident conflict between China and Japan. He made a knight in the same year. The British position in Shanghai was repeatedly attacked by the Japanese in the mid-thirties and not long after left the post in Shanghai, in July 1937 Japan instigated the Marco Polo Bridge Incident, marking the beginning of the Second Sino-Japanese War.

After returning to Britain, Brenan served as a Chinese affairs adviser to the Foreign Office. With regard to the future of Hong Kong, he proposed during World War II that Britain give up sovereignty, but his view was strongly opposed by Colonial Office, and the Foreign Office did not take his view seriously. Brenan officially retired in 1943, ending his 40-year diplomatic career. He died of illness in Royal Tunbridge Wells in 1953, at the age of 69.

== English reference materials ==
- "Deaths", North China Herald, 11 October 1889, p. 1.
- The North China Herald, 17 July 1901.
- Descent and Alliances of Croslegh: or Crossle, or Crossley, of Scaitcliffe; and Coddington of Oldbridge; and Evans, of Eyton Hall. The De La More Press, 1904.
- Ruvigny, The Marquis de, The Roll of Honour: A Biographical Record of All Members of His Majesty's Naval and Military Forces Who Have Fallen in the War Volume I. London: The Standard Art Book Company Limited, 1916.
- Lunt, Carroll, The China Who's Who 1922: A Biographical Dictionary. Shanghai: Kelly & Walsh, Limited, 1922.
- "Sir James Jamieson - Shortly Leaving for Home - Vacancy to be filled by Mr Brenan", Hongkong Daily Press, 27 March 1926, p. 5.
- "The Canton Situation", The Singapore Free Press and Mercantile Advertiser, 8 July 1926, p. 6.
- "No. 8/1926: Correspondence in Connection with the Negotiations for the Settlement of the Boycott", Sessional Papers Laid Before the Legislative Council of Hongkong 1926. Hong Kong: The Legislative Council of Hong Kong, 1926.
- "No. 7/1927: Bias Bay Piracies - Endeavours to obtain co-operation of Canton Government in its suppression", Sessional Papers Laid Before the Legislative Council of Hongkong 1927. Hong Kong: The Legislative Council of Hong Kong, 1927.
- Proceedings of the Legislative Council of Hong Kong. Hong Kong: The Legislative Council of Hong Kong, 15 March 1928.
- The Straits Times, 24 May 1929, p. 10.
- "Consul's Appeal to Chinese - Future Status of Shanghai - Mr Brenan Urges Control of Hotheads", The Hongkong Telegraph, 5 March 1930, p. 7.
- "Gambling Evil in Shanghai - Greyhound Racing to Stop", The Singapore Free Press and Mercantile Advertiser, 11 November 1930, p. 12.
- "Shanghai Dog Racing - Efforts to Put Permanent Stop to It", The Straits Times, 15 November 1930, p. 6.
- "British Consul in Motor Smash - Mr. J. F. Brenan of Shanghai Badly Hurt - Severe Collision", The South China Morning Post, 24 February 1931, p. 10.
- "Shanghai Battle Resumed", The Singapore Free Press and Mercantile Advertiser, 3 February 1932, p. 11.
- "A Move on the Sport: Admiral Kelly's Peace Proposals", The Singapore Free Press and Mercantile Advertiser, 17 February 1932, p. 12.
- "Origin of Shanghai Troubles - League of Nations Committee's Report", The Straits Times, 23 February 1932, p. 6.
- "Peace Meeting Called and Cancelled", The Singapore Free Press and Mercantile Advertiser, 11 March 1932, p. 9.
- "Birthday Honours", North China Daily News, 4 June 1932.
- "Sir John and Lady Brenan - Leaving Shanghai on Well-earned Leave", Hong Kong Daily Press, 31 March 1933, p. 7.
- "Sir John Brenan in Singapore on Way Back to Shanghai", The Straits Times, 9 December 1933, p. 12.
- "Japanese Seize British Subject in S'hai Scuffle", The Hongkong Telegraph, 2 October 1936, p. 1.
- "New British Consul at Shanghai", The Straits Times, 22 December 1936, p. 12
- "Protest Expected over Assault - British Policeman Struck by Japanese Sentry", The Straits Times, 10 January 1937, p. 8.
- "B.W.A. Farewell to Lady Brenan", Hong Kong Daily Press, 10 March 1937, p. 6.
- "Sir John Brenan Sails - China Adviser in Foreign Office", The China Mail, 22 March 1937, p. 24.
- "Death of Sir John Brenan - Former Consul General in S'hai", The South China Morning Post, 15 January 1953, p. 8.
- "BRENAN Sir John Fitzgerald K.C.M.G.", Calendars of the Grants of Probate and Letters of Administration (England and Wales), 1953.
- "The Consul General at Shanghai (Gauss) to the Secretary of State: No. 507", Foreign Relations of the United States Diplomatic Papers, 1936, The Far East, Volume IV. Washington: United States Government Printing Office, 1954.
- "Obituary: BRENAN, SIR JOHN FITZGERALD, K.C.M.G.", The Foreign Office List and Diplomatic and Consular Year Book. Great Britain: Foreign Office; Harrison and sons, 1954.
- Lowe, Peter, Great Britain and the Origins of the Pacific War: A Study of British Policy in East Asia, 1937-1941. Oxford: Clarendon Press, 1977. ISBN 978-0-19822-427-3
- Brenan, Gerald, A Life of One's Own: Childhood and Youth. Cambridge : Cambridge University Press, 1979. ISBN 978-0-52129-734-9
- Horrocks, Robert James, The Guangzhou-Hongkong Strike, 1925-1926: Hongkong Workers in an Anti-Imperialist Movement. Department of East Asian Studies, The University of Leeds, October 1994.
- Gillies, Donald, Radical Diplomat: The Life of Sir Archibald Clark Kerr, Lord Inverchapel, 1882-1951. London: I. B. Tauris, 1999. ISBN 978-1-86064-296-8
- Nish, Ian, and, Kibata, Yoichi, The History of Anglo-Japanese Relations, 1600-2000: Volume I: The Political-Diplomatic Dimension, 1600-1930. Basingstoke: Macmillan Press, 2000.
- Whitfield, Andrew, Hong Kong, Empire and the Anglo-American Alliance. New York: Palgrave Macmillan, 2001. ISBN 978-1-40391-397-5
- Marci, Franco David, "Abandoning the outpost: rejection of the Hong Kong purchase scheme of 1938-39", Journal of the Hong Kong Branch of the Royal Asiatic Society Vol. 50, 2010, pp. 303–316.
- Shai, Aron, Origins of the War in the East. Routledge, 2010. ISBN 978-1-13692-449-1
- "Brenan, Byron", Who was Who. London: A. & C. Black, retrieved on 26 August 2018. (Electronic version. Subscription via the Wikipedia Library)
- "Brenan, (Edward Fitz-) Gerald", Who was Who. London: A. & C. Black, retrieved on 26 August 2018. (Electronic version. Subscription via the Wikipedia Library)
- "Brenan, Sir John (Fitzgerald)", Who was Who. London: A. & C. Black, retrieved on 26 August 2018. (Electronic version. Subscription via the Wikipedia Library)
- "Brenan, Terence Vincent", Who was Who. London: A. & C. Black, retrieved on 26 August 2018. (Electronic version. Subscription via the Wikipedia Library)
- "British Armed Forces And Overseas Deaths And Burials: Usticke Cyre L Brenan", Genes Reunited, retrieved on 26 August 2018.
- "Grouville groom marriages - B", Jerripedia Birth, Marriage and Burial Records, retrieved on 26 August 2018.
- "St Luke groom marriages - B", Jerripedia Birth, Marriage and Burial Records, retrieved on 26 August 2018.
- "Family Tree: Edward Vincent Brenan", FamilySearch, retrieved on 26 August 2018.
- "England Marriages, 1538–1973: John Fitzgerald Brenan", FamilySearch, retrieved on 26 August 2018.
- "England and Wales Marriage Registration Index, 1837-2005: John F Brenan", FamilySearch, retrieved on 26 August 2018.
- "England and Wales Death Registration Index 1837-2007: Kathleen Brenan", FamilySearch, retrieved on 26 August 2018.
- "England and Wales Death Registration Index 1837-2007: Silvia Brenan", FamilySearch, retrieved on 26 August 2018.
- "Ohio Death Index, 1908-1932, 1938-1944, and 1958-2007: Eric H Brenan", FamilySearch, retrieved on 26 August 2018.
- "United States Border Crossings from Canada to United States, 1895-1956: John Fitzgerald Brenan", FamilySearch, retrieved on 26 August 2018.
- "World Miscellaneous Births and Baptisms, 1534-1983: Donah May Brenan", FamilySearch, retrieved on 26 August 2018.
- "World Miscellaneous Births and Baptisms, 1534-1983: Usticke Cyril Brenan", FamilySearch, retrieved on 26 August 2018.
