= Daniel Robertson =

Daniel Robertson may refer to:

- Daniel Robertson (architect) (died 1849), British architect
- Daniel Robertson (British Army officer) (1733–1819), British military officer in North America
- Daniel Robertson (colonial administrator) (1813–1892), British colonial administrator
- Daniel Robertson (infielder) (born 1994), American professional baseball shortstop
- Daniel Robertson (outfielder) (born 1985), American professional baseball outfielder
- Daniel A. Robertson (1812–1895), American newspaper editor and politician
- Daniel Brooke Robertson (1810–1881), British diplomat

== See also ==
- Robertson Daniel (born 1991), American football player
