= Pelham Warren =

Pelham Warren may refer to:

- Pelham Warren (physician)
- Sir Pelham Warren (diplomat)
