= Alwyne Ogden =

British diplomat (1889–1981)

Sir Alwyne Ogden KBE CMG FRSA

British Consul-General in Shanghai
- In office 1945–1948
- Preceded by: Sir Anthony Hastings George
- Succeeded by: Sir Michael Cavenagh Gillett

Personal details
- Born: 29 June 1889 Simla, India
- Died: 17 September 1981 (aged 92)
- Children: 2
- Education: Corpus Christi College, Cambridge
- Occupation: Diplomat

Sir Alwyne George Neville Ogden (29 June 1889 – 17 September 1981) was a British diplomat who served as consul-general in Shanghai from 1945 to 1948.

== Early life and education ==
Ogden was born on 29 June 1889 in Simla, India, the son of William Ogden, a railway auditor at Indian Government Railways, and Emily Mary Stowell. He was educated at Dulwich College and Corpus Christi College, Cambridge where he took a degree in classics and history.

== Career ==
Ogden joined the China Consular Service as a student interpreter in 1912 after failing to enter the Indian Civil Service. From 1917 to 1918, he was assigned to the War Office and was involved in obtaining supplies for the British Army and recruitment for the Chinese Labour Corps in Shandong, and in 1922 served on special assignment on the Tibetan border. From 1922 to 1923, he served as acting consul-general at Chengtu. He also served at Peking; Tientsin; Tsinanfu; Hankow; Changsha; Kiukiang; Chefoo; Wei-Hai-Wei; Nanking; and Shanghai. While at Kiukiang in 1927, the British concession was overrun and abandoned, and for his handling of the crisis he received the OBE. In 1937, he was promoted to consul (grade I). During the Second Sino-Japanese War, while head of the consulate at Shanghai, he successfully organised the evacuation of British women and children from the city.

In 1941, Ogden served as acting consul-general at Tientsin, and when the Pacific War began he and his family were put under house arrest before they were repatriated in July 1942. That year he was transferred to Kunming where he served until 1945. He was also acting judge of the British Supreme Court for China from 1942 to 1943. His final posting was as consul-general at Shanghai from 1945 until 1948. He organised the administration of the city's internment camps which held approximately 7,000 Britons for which he received the CMG. He retired from the Foreign Office in 1948.

== Personal life and death ==
Ogden married Jessie Vera Bridge (died 1969) in 1922, daughter of a British missionary in China, and they had a son and a daughter. In retirement Ogden was an active member of the China-British Business Association and the China Cultural Society, and wrote articles about China and its history. In 1952, he became a Fellow of the Royal Society of Arts (FRSA).

Ogden died on 17 September 1981, aged 92.

== Honours ==
Ogden was appointed Companion of the Order of St Michael and St George (CMG) in the 1946 New Year Honours. He was appointed Officer of the Order of the British Empire (OBE) in the 1927 Birthday Honours and promoted to Knight Commander of the Order of the British Empire (KBE) in the 1948 Birthday Honours.

== See also ==
- China–United Kingdom relations

Diplomatic posts
| Preceded by Sir Anthony Hastings George | British Consul-General in Shanghai; 1945–1948 | Succeeded by Sir Michael Cavenagh Gillett |
