= Herbert Phillips (diplomat) =

British diplomat

Sir Herbert Phillips KCMG, OBE
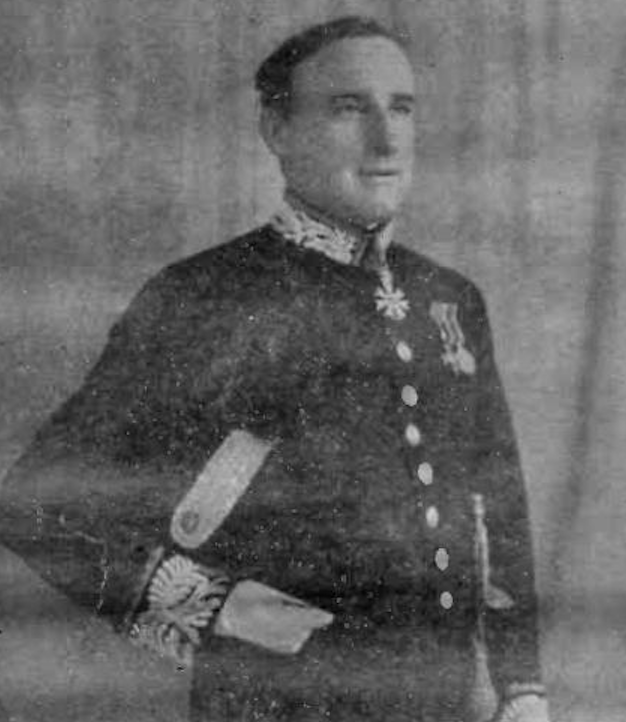

British Consul General, Canton
- In office 1930–1937

British Consul-General, Shanghai
- In office 1937–1940
- Preceded by: John Fitzgerald Brenan
- Succeeded by: Anthony Hastings George

Personal details
- Born: 8 July 1878
- Died: 27 March 1957 (aged 78) Henley-on-Thames, England

Sir Herbert Phillips KCMG OBE, (1878-1957) was a British diplomat who served in China. His last position before retirement from government service was as British Consul-General in Shanghai.

== Career ==
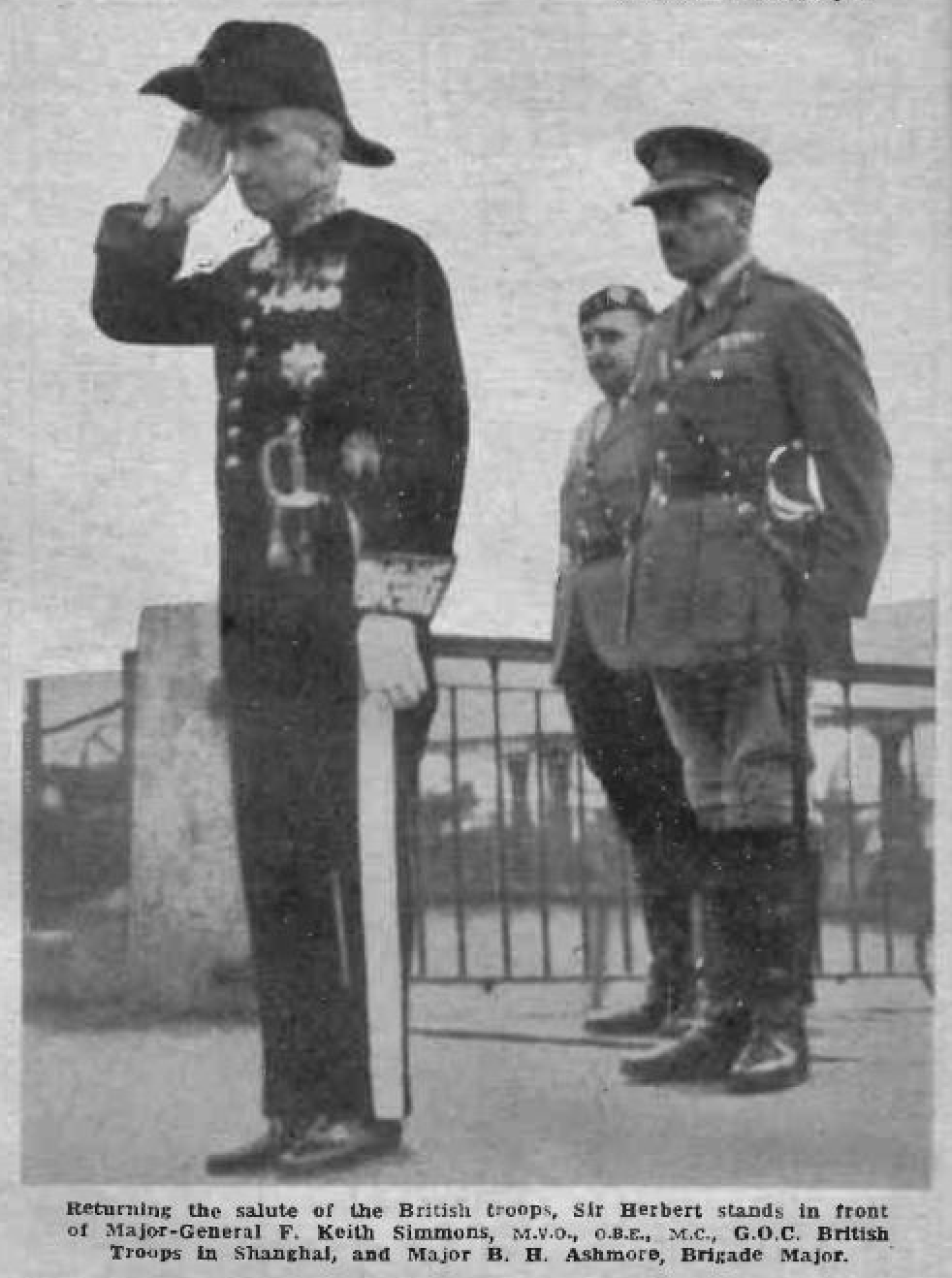
Sir Herbert Phillips on his departure from Shanghai in 1940. Maj Gen Frank Keith Simmons is immediately behind him

Phillips was born on 8 July 1878.

Phillips joined the British China consular service as a student interpreter in 1898. In 1900, Phillips was appointed a 2nd Class Assistant and in 1903 appointed Acting Vice Consul in Tianjin. In 1904, he acted as Chief Clerk and Registrar of the British Supreme Court for China and Corea. He was promoted to First Class Assistant in 1906 and served as Acting Vice Consul in Chongqing from December 1907 to April 1909. He was appointed Acting Chinese Secretary of the British Legation in Peking in 1910. He was promoted to Vice Consul in 1911 and was appointed Consul in Wuzhou. He did not take up the position going instead to Shanghai as consul in 1913. He was called to the bar of the Middle Temple in 1914.

Between 1919 and 1925 Phillips served as consul in Niuzhuang (now Yingkou), Fuzhou and Harbin. He was appointed Inspector-General of Consular Establishments in the Far East with the personal rank of Consul General in 1925 and then served as consul general in Nanjing (although based in Shanghai) and then in Canton from February 1930. He was transferred as consul-general to Shanghai 1937.

== Awards and decorations ==
Phillips received the China Medal in 1900.

He was awarded an OBE in 1918 and made a CMG in 1927. He was knighted (KCMG) in 1938.

== Retirement and death ==
Phillips retired from consular service in January 1940 and returned to England. He died in Henley-on-Thames on 27 March 1957.
