= List of consuls-general of the United Kingdom in Shanghai =

Consul-General of the United Kingdom in Shanghai
- Coat of Arms of the United Kingdom
- Incumbent; Matt Burney since September 2023
- Style: His Excellency
- Residence: Shanghai
- Inaugural holder: George Balfour
- Formation: 1 December 1842
- Website: British Consulate-General Shanghai

The consul-general from the United Kingdom in Shanghai is the United Kingdom's diplomatic representative within the city of Shanghai in China. From 1842 to 1949 the consul-general's office and residence was located in the British Consulate General in Shanghai on the Bund; from 1985 to 2014 in the Shanghai Centre on Nanjing West Road; and from December 2014 in the new British Centre on West Beijing Road.

== List of consuls-general ==
=== Consuls, 1842–1880 ===
Name	Tenure begin	Tenure end	Notes
George Balfour	1 December 1842	7 October 1846	
Rutherford Alcock	7 October 1846	May 1854	
Sir Daniel Brooke Robertson	May 1854	December 1858	
Sir Harry Smith Parkes	December 1858	March 1865	
Thomas Taylor Meadows	23 July 1859	April 1863	(Note: Acting Consul.)
Frederick E. B. Harvey	April 1863	6 June 1863	
John Markham	6 June 1863	March 1865	
Charles Alexander Winchester	March 1865	January 1871	
Walter Henry Medhurst	January 1871	March 1880	(Note: Acting Consul from July 1868 to January 1871.)
Arthur Davenport	January 1877	March 1880	

=== Consuls-general, 1880–1958 ===
Name	Tenure begin	Tenure end	Notes
Patrick Joseph Hughes	March 1880	1 April 1891	
Sir Nicholas John Hannen	1 April 1891	13 November 1897	(Note: Also served as Chief Justice of the British Supreme Court for China and Japan, 1891–1900.)
George Jamieson	13 November 1897	13 May 1899	
Byron Brenan	13 May 1899	1 July 1901	
Sir Pelham Laird Warren	1 July 1901	January 1911	
Sir Everard Duncan Home Fraser	July 1911	24 August 1922	
James William Jamieson	23 June 1919	January 1920	(Note: Acting Consul-General.)
Sir Sidney Barton	24 August 1922	21 May 1929	
John Fitzgerald Brenan	21 May 1929	14 August 1932	
Charles Edward Whitmore	14 August 1932	12 December 1932	
Arthur Dickinson Blackburn	12 December 1932	27 March 1933	
John Wallace Ord Davidson	27 March 1933	19 December 1933	
Sir John Fitzgerald Brenan	19 December 1933	10 September 1935	
John Wallace Ord Davidson	10 September 1935	24 September 1937	
Sir Herbert Phillips	24 September 1937	17 January 1940	
Sir Anthony Hastings George	17 January 1940	8 December 1941	(Note: Term interrupted by Japanese occupation of the Shanghai International Settlement and declaration of war.)
Sir Alwyne Ogden	8 September 1945	21 June 1947	
Michael Cavenagh Gillett	21 June 1947	2 November 1948	
Sir Robert Urquhart	2 November 1948	July 1950	
Kenneth Bumstead	4 July 1950	1950	
Scott Burdett	1950	1951	
John Coghill	1951	1952	
Allan Veitch	1952	September 1954	
Frederick Garner	September 1954	July 1956	
Ayrton John Seaton Pullan	July 1956	May 1958	

=== British consuls attached to the Shanghai overseas Chinese affairs commissioner, 1958–1967 ===
Name	Tenure begin	Tenure end	Notes
Harry Wright	June 1958	July 1960	
Frank Chatterton Butler	July 1960	February 1962	
Brian Stewart	February 1962	July 1962	
Douglas Spankie	4 July 1962	June 1964	
Douglas Brookfield	June 1964	July 1966	
Peter Hewitt	October 1966	24 May 1967	

=== Consuls-general, 1985–present ===
Name	Tenure begin	Tenure end	Notes
Trevor Mound	March 1985	June 1987	
Iain Orr	June 1987	December 1990	
John Macdonald	December 1990	1994	
Simon Featherstone	1994	1996	
Warren Townend	1996	2000	
Paul Raymond Sizeland	2000	July 2003	
Sue Bishop	July 2003	December 2006	
Carma Elliot	December 2006	January 2011	
Brian Davidson	January 2011	June 2015	
John Edwards	June 2015	June 2019	
Chris Wood	July 2019	June 2023	
Matt Burney	September 2023		

== See also ==
- Former Consulate-General of the United Kingdom, Shanghai
- British Supreme Court for China
