= Anthony Hastings George =

British diplomat

Sir Anthony Hastings George KCMG
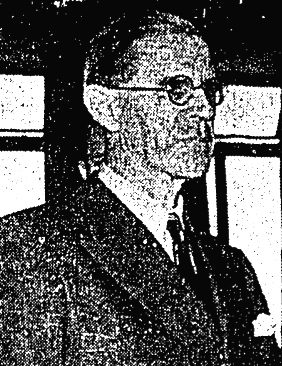

British Consul General, Shanghai
- In office August 1940 – 8 December 1941
- Preceded by: Sir Herbert Phillips
- Succeeded by: Sir Alwyne Ogden (post WWII)

British Consul General, Boston
- In office 1943 – 9 January 1944 (died in office)
- Preceded by: Hugh Ford
- Succeeded by: Bernard Sullivan

Personal details
- Born: 3 November 1886 Bristol, England
- Died: 9 January 1944 (aged 57) Baltimore, United States

Sir Anthony Hastings George KCMG (乔治爵士; 3 November 1886 – 9 January 1944) was a British diplomat, who served as British Consul-General in Shanghai and Boston during the Second World War.

== Early life ==
Anthony Hastings George was born in Bristol, England on 3 November 1886. He was the son of William Edwards George and Charlotte Elizabeth Otway. He attended Malvern College where he was house prefect. He also played cricket and football. He left in Easter 1903 to read for the diplomatic service exam.

== Consular positions in China ==
George entered the Diplomatic Service in the China Consular Service on 23 October 1908 and was posted to the legation in Peking as a student interpreter. He was promoted to be a second assistant in 1915. After many years service he rose to be appointed a Vice-Consul in China on 27 August 1926.

On 27 September 1929 George was appointed a Consul-General in China. However, on 1 January 1930 he was further promoted to be Commercial Secretary, of the Second Grade, at the Legation in Peking to Minister Sir Miles Lampson. Most legation officials spent their time between Peking, Nanking (the official capital of China since 1928) and Shanghai, which was made even more difficult by the Japanese war with China from 1937; Ambassador Sir Hughe Knatchbull-Hugessen was shot and injured when Japanese aircraft strafed his car as he travelled to Shanghai from Nanking in August 1937.

During these hostilities, George received American golfing champion Walter Hagen during his visit to Shanghai's Hungjao Golf Club: "Pointing to the eighteenth green, [Hagen] noticed the freshly turfed grass and unfilled bunkers. 'They were shelled a few days ago,' explained Anthony 'Frank' Hastings George of the British Consulate. 'They rebuilt it especially for your visit!'". For his service to the embassy, on 9 June 1938 he was made a Companion of the Order of St Michael and St George (CMG).

In August 1940 he was appointed British Consul-General in Shanghai. Shanghai was a tenuous posting, involving managing the British government's approach to the Shanghai Municipal Council as well as increasingly difficult relations with the Japanese who had occupied the Chinese city in since 1937. Most British troops defending the settlement had been withdrawn earlier in the year and George's position was not a strong one. George served until the Japanese declaration of war and seizure of the Shanghai International Settlement in December 1941. Interned by the Japanese for eight months, in mid 1942 George was repatriated aboard the Kamakura Maru to Lorenco Marques (now Maputo) and then returned to London. For his service in Shanghai, George was later appointed as a Knight Commander of the Order of St Michael and St George (KCMG) on 2 June 1943.

== Consular position in the United States ==
George was later appointed as Consul-General to the US states of Massachusetts, Vermont, New Hampshire, Maine and Rhode Island, resident in Boston in August 1943.

== Death ==
George, who had never fully recovered from amoebic dysentery contracted during his internment in Shanghai, was continually suffering poor health and went on a visit to Baltimore, Maryland, in January 1944 before planning to return to London on sick leave. While staying at the Lord Baltimore Hotel George fell to his death from his room on the fourth floor, which was later pronounced to be suicide. On his death, the New York edition of the Shanghai Evening Post & Mercury noted that his death was "a true war casualty. There can be no doubt that his act was a direct result of depression arising from his experiences in Shanghai where, as British consul general, he went through the first eight months of the hostilities with Japan. Before repatriation he contracted illness which unquestionably was a major factor in the ultimate tragedy."

== Publications ==
- George, Anthony Hastings; Pelham, George Clinton; Butler, P. D. (1935). Trade and economic conditions in China, 1933–1935 (Report / Department of Overseas Trade, no. 623 ed.). London: His Majesty's Stationery Office.
- George, Sir Anthony Hastings (1943). China. An international address at Washington: 1943. Princeton: Princeton University Press. p. 40.

Diplomatic posts
| Preceded by Herbert Phillips | Consul-General in Shanghai; 1940–1941 | No representation due to Japanese occupation |
| Preceded by Hugh Ford | Consul-General in Boston; 1943–1944 | Succeeded by Bernard Sullivan |
