= Pelham Warren (diplomat) =

British diplomat (1845–1923)

Sir Pelham Warren KCMG

British consul-general in Shanghai
- In office 1901–1911
- Preceded by: Byron Brenan
- Succeeded by: Sir Everard Duncan Home Fraser

Personal details
- Born: 22 August 1845
- Died: 21 November 1923 (aged 78) Sidmouth, Devon
- Occupation: Diplomat

Sir Pelham Laird Warren (22 August 1845 – 21 November 1923) was a British diplomat who served as British consul-general in Shanghai from 1901 to 1911.

== Biography ==
Warren was born on 22 August 1845, the son of Admiral Richard Laird Warren.

Warren was appointed a student interpreter in the China consular service in 1867 after competitive examination. In 1869, he was promoted to acting third class assistant, and in 1873, to acting second class assistant. After serving as interpreter at Foochow from 1873 to 1874, he was promoted to first class assistant in 1876.

In 1876, Warren was appointed acting consul at Ningpo; then served at Wenchow from 1877 to 1879; and at Taiwan from 1880 to 1881. In 1883, he was vice-consul at Pagoda Island, and acting consul at Taiwan in 1883, 1884 and in 1886. In 1886, he was promoted to consul at Taiwan, and then transferred to Hankow in 1893. While serving at Hankow in 1899 he was promoted to consul-general.

In 1900, Warren was transferred to Shanghai as acting consul general and was employed for six months on special service. In 1901, he was appointed consul-general in Shanghai, a post he held until his retirement in 1911.

Warren married Mary Donnithorne Humfridge in 1875.

Warren died on 21 November 1923 at Sidmouth, Devon, aged 78.

== Honours ==
Warren was appointed Companion of the Order of St Michael and St George (CMG) in the 1901 New Year Honours, and promoted to Knight Commander (KCMG) in the 1902 Coronation Honours.

== See also ==
- China–United Kingdom relations

Diplomatic posts
Preceded by Byron Brenan	British consul-general in Shanghai; 1901–1911	Succeeded by Sir Everard Duncan Home Fraser
