= C. H. Gonda =

Hungarian architect

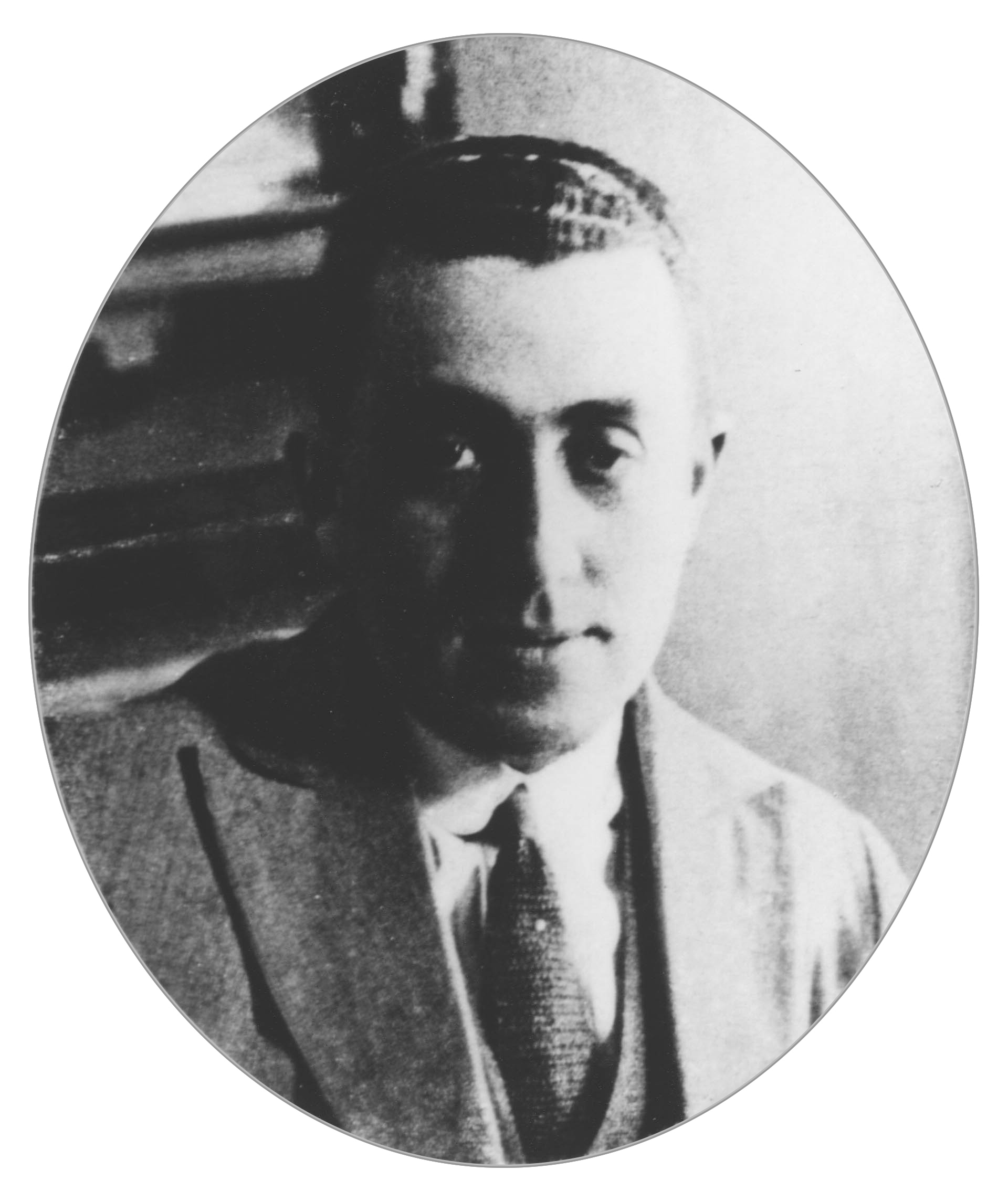
- Born: Károly Goldstein; June 29, 1889; Gyöngyös, Austria-Hungary
- Died: April 1, 1969 (aged 79); Lakewood, New Jersey, U.S.
- Occupation: Architect

Charles Henry Gonda (22 June 1889 – 1 April 1969), professionally known as C. H. Gonda, was a Hungarian architect famous for his ultra-modern style of building. He was active in Shanghai throughout the 1920s–1940s and began working on his first project, the Messrs, Lane, Crawford & Co's New Frontage building, in 1922 after leaving his previous firm Probst, Hanbury & Co.. Among his largest extant works are the Capitol Theatre (光陆大戏院), Sun Sun Department Store (新新公司), Cathay Theatre (国泰电影院), the Bank of East Asia (东亚银行) and the Bank of Communications (交通银行).

== Biography ==
=== Early life ===
C. H. Gonda was born in Gyöngyös, Austro-Hungary as Károly Goldstein, the younger son in a family of the Jewish merchant Henrik Goldstein and the housewife Róza Balkányi. In 1902, the Goldsteins changed their surname to Gonda to make it sound more Hungarian. Following the death of Henrik, the family moved to Vienna, where Károly finished his secondary education and his older brother Aurel started working as a doctor. In 1908, Károly Gonda enrolled at the Technical College of Vienna's School of Architecture but dropped out during the summer semester of 1914. He made his way to Paris, where he likely received a diploma from the Ecole des Beaux-Arts and later apprenticed in London for about a year.

When the First World War broke out, both Károly and Aurel were drafted. Károly served in the 309th regiment of the national guard infantry, for which in 1917 he was awarded a silver medal for valor, second class. He was captured by the Russians and assigned to a prisoner's war camp near Nikolsk-Ussuriysk. While in captivity, he met Evdokia, the daughter of the well-known architect N.V. Dmitriev, who had moved from Moscow to Vladivostok to escape the tumult of the Russian revolution. As Gonda spoke Hungarian, German, English, French, and Russian, Evdokia hired him as the language teacher for her two sons from the previous marriage, George and Vladimir. Károly and Evdokia married in January 1919, and Gonda adopted Evdokia's sons.

=== Life in Shanghai ===
As Russia was getting entrenched in the civil war, the couple left the country and went to China, arriving in Shanghai on September 15, 1920; the children followed soon after. Gonda found employment at the Property and Estate Department of the British firm Probst, Hanbury & Co., and the family settled on Dixwell Road (now Liyang Lu 溧阳路). Having soon attained a promotion, Gonda relocated to the more central Ferry Road (now Xikang Lu 西康路), where they lived in an affluent colonial-style villa, with a private tennis court, driving a large green Packard and employing several servants. As he rose to be a renowned architect, Gonda revolved with the foreign elites, including Shanghai's top oligarch Victor Sassoon. The family also socialized with the Hungarians, Austrians, and Russians, many of whom were former prisoners of war.

C. H. Gonda had an architectural career that spanned 25 years. By some accounts, he designed more than forty buildings in Shanghai alone. He was an avid proponent of modernist style, having published a eulogy for it entitled "Modern and Ancient Forms in Local Architecture," writing under the pseudonym Adnog (his surname reversed), in which he expressed his animosity towards historicism: “As an engineer would refuse to design an airship in Gothic or Renaissance style, an architect should refuse to design a bank building or an apartment house in Renaissance of Gothic. […] The pulse of our time has to be heard, and from the chaos of indescribable horrors of bad taste slowly but surely the new style is awakening.”

Gonda was among the first practitioners of the modernist, or art deco, style in Shanghai: “A new architecture has been born out of our mechanical age, and rightly or wrongly termed ‘modernistic,’ is the logical outcome of the tremendous social changes in our lives, in our methods of construction and in our needs and tastes.”. Consistent with his commitment to technological progress, Gonda considered cinema the most important of contemporary entertainments and embraced its influence on modern architecture. Among the two dozen of his buildings in China that have been identified to this day, more than half are movie theaters.

Gonda was also a proficient oil painter; his paintings were frequently exhibited at Shanghai art shows, and he sat on the selection committees. Gonda was an active member of the Shanghai Jewish community and participated in its fund-raising campaigns, as well as in Russian charity events.

In 1938, the architect's brother, Dr. Aurel Gonda, and his family escaped the fascist Vienna and joined C. H. Gonda in Shanghai. After the Communist victory in China in 1949, the brothers and their families left for the US and settled in Lakewood, New Jersey. Having retired from architecture, C. H. Gonda focused on landscape painting. He died in 1969, one year after his wife.

== Architectural career ==
=== The 1920s ===
In the early months of 1922, the architectural studio of C. H. Gonda (Chinese name 鸿达) opened at 4 Ezra Road (now Xinkang Lu 新康路). Initially, it only employed one Russian assistant architect, N. N. Emanoff, and one Chinese agent, L. C. Mow, but as the practice grew, it employed other architects, engineers, interior designers, and draftsmen, mostly from among the Eastern European and the Russian communities, as well as local Chinese specialists. A business listing of C. H. Gonda's firm in July 1926 lists 11 persons on the staff, including a representative in Tianjin.

Specializing primarily in commercial buildings, Gonda's studio won numerous design competitions and received major commissions in Shanghai, Hangzhou, Yantai, Tianjin, and Beijing. His first known project was the rebuilding and the modernization of the Lane, Crawford & Co. store on Shanghai's main shopping promenade, Nanking Road, which was built without interrupting the store's operation and finished in December 1922. The show windows, believed to be the largest in the Far East, spanned 48 feet and installation of extra large glass required some ingenuous engineering and the use of sturdy concrete pillars sunk into the soil. In summer 1923, Gonda designed and supervised the construction of the China and the South Sea Bank (中南银行). He commuted to Amoy (now Xiamen) several times and in 1923 was elected honorary architect to the Amoy University.

Gonda's next project was the design of the Sun Sun Department Store (新新百货公司) for the local businessmen S. K. Lau, situated on Nanking Road. The construction began in early 1924, and the building, which cost 4,000,000 taels, was inaugurated in January 1926. The seven-story department store, hotel and amusement centre was topped with a tower, bringing the total height to 55 meters (180 feet). The press called Sun Sun Co. “spacious, commodious and different department store […] constructed on the most modern lines, [with] plenty of windows and good indirect lighting, comfortable lifts and adequate display counters.”

In April 1925, the construction work started on the six-story Bank of East Asia (东亚银行), on the corner of Jiujiang and Middle Sichuan Roads. When the building was inaugurated in February 1926, it was called Gonda's “triumph in a style of architecture new to Shanghai.” The building boasted innovative structural decisions, such as the banking hall without a single column. This project emphatically put forward the modernist aesthetic, still novel at that time, which would become Gonda's signature.

In 1927, Gonda's other project rose in the downtown – the Shahmoon Building, at 21 Museum Road (today's Huqiu Lu 虎丘路), the property of S. E. Shahmoon & Co. Its architectural design was praised for its originality, simplicity and restrained ornamentation. The curved facade featured three horizontal divisions topped by a classic stepped-back art deco pinnacle – a recurring element in Gonda's buildings. The Shahmoon Building housed the Capitol Theatre at the bottom and offices of major film studios on the five floors above. The 1000-seat Capitol Theatre was Shanghai's first air-conditioned movie house, and the first to feature a pillar-less design, for unobstructed sight lines. The foyer was richly decorated with frescoes – the work of the Russian artist Victor Podgoursky – and twenty allegorical sculptures representing various arts, created by the Hungarian George Koppany. Concealed lighting fixtures and ornamental copper grills lent the space its theatrical and elevated atmosphere.

In February 1928, C. H. Gonda relocated his practice to the Shahmoon Building and announced a partnership with the German architect Emil Busch, under the name Gonda & Busch (Chinese name 鸿宝). The new studio produced the design of the Grand Theatre (大光明电影院), on Bubbling Well Road opposite the Racecourse, which opened in December 1928. The movie house, constructed in the old Carlton Ballroom building, was called “the most luxurious in the Far East.” Besides a 1200-seat auditorium, it had two tearooms decorated in jazz patterns. Gonda & Busch were said to have “achieved a noteworthy effect in combining the beautiful old circular staircases, spacious lounges, and rotunda with the most advanced ideas in theatrical design.” The walls and staircases were treated with filigree flat-oil stain in old gold – the first use of this technique in China – executed by the studio of the Russian artist Jacob Lehonos.

Melchers Godown was among other projects of Gonda & Busch, which was the construction of the 50,000 square-foot 5-story warehouse, owned by the German A. Widmann, which opened in May 1929 on East Broadway (now Dongdaming Lu 东大名路). At the end of the year, the Gonda & Busch partnership dissolved.

In December 1929, C. H. Gonda publicized his design of the 16-story Grand Hotel, to stand next to the Grand Theatre facing the Racecourse. The 560-room hotel was appointed to the top floors, while the lower floors provided ten lounges, ballrooms, and concert rooms. Later announcements anticipated the start of the construction for autumn 1930 and increased the projected height of the building to 21 floors. The construction, intended for the Grand Realty Co., was estimated at 900,000 taels, later reevaluated to 2,500,000 taels. Another project for the Grand Realty was publicized simultaneously, estimated to cost 200,000 taels. This was a four-story office building at the corner of Burkill and Park Roads, designated to host legal and medical professionals. Neither of these projects was realized.

Another unrealized 1929 project was a 7-story apartment house on the corner of Rue Lafayette and Route Pichon, in the French Concession. The building was to contain 28 apartments, garages, and a roof garden; the cost of the construction was estimated at 200,000 taels.

=== The 1930s ===
The next decade saw the realization of multiple designs by C. H. Gonda. In August 1930, he took charge of the reconstruction of the Whiteaway, Laidlaw & Co. department store on Nanking Road. The work intended to increase the amount of natural light and ventilation by adding steel casement windows and to visually update the façade by removing excess ornamentation. When the building was still in scaffolding, in November 1930, a fire gutted the two top floors and erased much of the recently finished interiors.

In September 1930, the Shanghai Jewish School opened on Seymour Road (now Shaanxi Bei Lu 陕西北路), next to the Ohel Rachel Synagogue. The utilitarian two-story building with a capacity for 250 students was constructed at a low cost of 200,000 taels, financed largely by the donation of the deceased entrepreneur S. Perry. The building contained an auditorium and a school canteen and was modeled after the recently built schools in Holland and the USA. Its construction, devoid of “superfluous and meaningless ornaments,” prioritized the access of maximum daylight and air into the classrooms.

Luna Park, the open-air amusement centre in the port district of Yangtszepoo, constructed after C. H. Gonda's designs, opened in July 1931, in time for the first citywide beauty pageant Miss Shanghai. The architect called Luna Park an “outstanding piece of outdoor construction and architectural work in Shanghai today.” That year Gonda also designed the interior of the Russian-owned restaurant Valencia, in the Hall & Holtz building on Sichuan Road.

Commissioned by the China Theatres Ltd., the Cathay Theatre (国泰电影院), on Avenue Joffre, opened on the first day of 1932, to become yet another triumph for its architect. A reinforced concrete corner structure clad in red brick was called “extra-super-modernistic,” while the “sumptuous interior” struck a viewer “dumb with excitement,” although some journalists called it “bizarrely decorated.” The interior walls were painted bronze, orange, and gold, with opaque glass lampshades providing illumination. For the 1,080-seat auditorium, Gonda designed a special chair, with added attention to “slope, height, comfort and appearance.” Cathay Theatre introduced a number of innovations, such as the rooftop projector, to screen films al fresco.

In November 1932, after two years of construction, the 2000-seat Ritz Theatre (融光大戏院) opened in Hongkou district, becoming the largest movie house in Shanghai. The façade with “severe constructional lines” was “naturally devoid of any superfluous ornamentation,” reserving ample space for billboards. The reinforced concrete single-story building had a large elliptical foyer with a domed ceiling on the ground floor, while the 2,000-seat auditorium was situated underground.

In 1934, Gonda publicized the plans for the Cosmopolitan Theatre on the border of the French Concession and the Chinese City. The six-story building was free not only from all the ornament but also “from the faults of false modernism such as is often seen.” The movie house on the ground floor accommodated 1,100 seats, and there were two floors of offices and three floors of apartments above it. The entrance was sheltered by a canopy, used for lighting and for advertising; three illuminated columns above it supported allegorical figures carrying globes of floodlight. The wide proscenium arch extended over the entire front of the auditorium; the stage could be used for theatrical performances as well as for movie screenings.

Gonda's expertise in the construction of movie theatres and hotels ensured him commissions in other cities in China. Late in 1934, Gonda designed the 800-seat Capitol Theatre in Beijing (then called Beiping) and the 900-seat Victoria Theatre in Tianjin's British Concession. The latter building was sited on a corner lot and combined a vertical stepped structure in the centre with horizontally banded wings. The canopy over the entrance functioned as a lighting feature, and the interior was lit with concealed lamps. The Capitol Theatre in Yantai was also credited to C. H. Gonda. Early in 1936, the Grand Hotel (大华饭店) opened in Hangzhou, built for the local magnate W. S. Tung on a site of a private villa on Wuping Road. The four-story building, overlooking the famous West Lake, contained 30 bedrooms, each with a bathroom and a deep-set concrete balcony.

Back in Shanghai, Gonda helped his relative, the entertainer Joe Farren (Joe's late sister was the first wife of Joe's brother, Dr Aurel Gonda) design a nightclub at the western end of the International Settlement, which opened in December 1937. The conversion of the garden residence into a ballroom and amusement centre involved “structural alterations of a very complicated nature.” Gonda incorporated his usual indirect lighting scheme, minimalist lines, spring dance floor, and built-in air conditioning.

In 1938, Gonda supervised the conversion of an indoor shopping arcade in the Bubbling Well Apartments into the 500-seat Uptown Theatre (平安电影院), owned by the Asia Theatres Inc. In June 1939, the 800-seat Doumer Theatre (杜美大戏院) opened on Route Doumer, converted from the old St. George's cabaret; the owners were Karl Gumpert and Heinz Cohn. The minimalist interior design was done in contrasting colors and had concealed lightning fixtures. In December that year, the Roxy Theatre (大华大戏院) opened on Bubbling Well Road, owned by the Far Eastern Theatres, Inc., reconstructed from the Embassy Theatre, which used to be at this address. Retaining the original foundations and bearing walls, Gonda completely redesigned the building, adhering to “simplicity and grandeur instead of indulging in detailed finesse.”

=== The 1940s ===
In 1941, Gonda designed the residential compound Hardoon Villas (哈同别墅) for the China Star Land Investment Co, composed of 88 three-story buildings, at 910 Weihaiwei Road (now Weihai Lu 威海路). The same year saw the construction of the Queen's Theater (皇后大戏院) on Yu Ya Ching Road (now Xizang Zhong Lu 西藏中路), for the Queen's Theatres Inc, which opened in February 1942. The theatre cost 3,000,000 taels to build and had 1,450 seats, which were unusually wide and arranged on a double incline. The architect departed from the usual ceiling design in theaters by bringing down the ceiling to the proscenium in gradual steps, to enhance the acoustics.

In 1942, the 950-seat Royal Theater (上海大戏院) was built in the French Concession, on Rue Lafayette (now Fuxing Zhong Lu 复兴中路), for the Société Française des Cinemas. The decor of the lobby was in rough-texture, multi-colored plaster, illuminated by decorative light fixtures, while the auditorium had concealed fluorescent light tubes.

Gonda's final large project in Shanghai was the Bank of Communications (交通银行) on the Bund, designed a decade earlier, but delayed because of the Japanese occupation. The building was finished in 1948, with the assistance of the Chinese firm Allied Architects. The bank's architecture demonstrates the characteristic central axial symmetry, stepped silhouette, and minimal ornamentation of the late art deco style.

== Famous works ==
Project	Name	Year of creation	Address	Current condition	Historical photo	Current photo
	Lane, Crawford & Co. store	1922	Nanking Road	not existing		
	China and the South Sea Bank	1923	Tianjin, 88 North Jiefang Road	existing		
	Bank of East Asia	1925	299 Middle Sichuan Road	existing		
	Sun Sun Co. Department Store	1926	720 East Nanjing Road	existing		
	Capitol Theatre	1927	146 Huqiu Road	existing		
	Grand Theatre	1928	Bubbling Well Road	not surviving		
	Melchers & Co. Godown	1929	713 Dongdaming Road	existing		
	Whiteaway, Laidlaw & Co	1930	100 East Nanjing Road	existing		
	Cosmopolitan Theatre	1930	550 Dongchangzhi Road	Not surviving		
	Luna Park	1931	Yangtszepoo	Demolished		
	Cathay Theatre	1931	870 Middle Huaihai Road	existing		
	Jewish School on Seymour Road	1931	500 North Shaanxi Road	existing		
	Ritz Theatre	1932	330 Haining Road	existing		
	Cosmopolitan Theatre	1934	Boulevard des Deux Republiques	unknown		
	Grand Hotel	1935	Hangzhou	Existing in a rebuilt state		
	Interior of the Farren's Night Club	1936	325 Great Western Road	Not surviving		
	Uptown Theatre	1938	991 West Nanjing Road	Not functioning as theatre		
	Victoria Theatre	before 1938	Tianjin	unknown		
	Capitol Theatre	before 1938	Beiping (Beijing)	unknown		
	Capitol Theatre	before 1938	Yantai	unknown		
	Doumer Theatre	1939	9 Route Doumer	not surviving		
	Roxy Theatre	1939	Bubbling Well Road	Not surviving		
	Hardoon Villa	1941	910 Weihai Road	surviving		
	Queen's Theatre	1941	Corner of Hankow and Tibet Roads	Not surviving		
	Royal Theatre	1941	1186 Middle Fuxing Road	existing		
	Bank of Communications	1941	14 The Bund	existing		

== See also ==
- László Hudec
