= 1901 New Year Honours =

Queen Victoria's appointments

The 1901 New Year Honours were appointments to various orders and honours of the United Kingdom and British India.

The list was published in The Times on 1 January 1901, and the various honours were gazetted in The London Gazette on 28 December 1900 and 8 January 1901.

The recipients of honours are displayed or referred to as they were styled before their new honour and arranged by honour and where appropriate by rank (Knight Grand Cross, Knight Commander etc.) then division (Military, Civil).

== Privy Council ==
- Lewis Fry, Esq.
- Thomas Frederick Halsey, Esq., MP
- Edmund Barton, QC, on the occasion of the Federation of the Australian Colonies
- Sir Samuel Walker Griffith, GCMG, Lieutenant-governor and Chief Justice of Queensland, on the occasion of the Federation of the Australian Colonies

== Baronet ==
- John Aird, Esq., MP
- Thomas Barlow, Esq., MD, Physician Extraordinary to the Queen
- Jonathan Edmund Backhouse, Esq.
- William Selby Church, Esq., MD, FRCS
- Colonel Robert Gunter, MP
- Wyndham Spencer Portal, Esq.

== Knight Bachelor ==
- Hugh Adcock, CMG
- Edward Henry Busk, Esq., Chairman of Convocation in the University of London
- Alfred Cooper, Esq., Surbiton
- Robert Harvey, Esq., High Sheriff of Cornwall
- Edward Wollaston Knocker, Esq., CB, Registrar of the Cinque Ports
- Hiram Maxim, Esq.
- John Mark, Esq., former Mayor of Manchester
- Joseph Sykes Rymer, Esq., late Lord Mayor of York
- Henry Miller, Speaker of the Legislative Council, New Zealand
- Arthur Robert Wallace, Esq., CB, DL, Principal Chief Clerk Secretary′s Office, Dublin Castle
- Edward Matthew Hodgson, Esq., JP, Chairman of the Rathmines and Rathgar Urban District Council
- John Quick, of Victoria, on the occasion of the Federation of the Australian Colonies

== The Most Honourable Order of the Bath ==
=== Knight Grand Cross of the Order of the Bath (GCB) ===
Civil Division

- Sir Alfred Milner, KCB, High Commissioner for South Africa
- Sir Francis Mowatt, KCB, Secretary to the Treasury
- Lord Justice Romer

=== Knights Commander of the Order of the Bath (KCB) ===
Civil Division

- Edward Chandos Leigh, CB, QC, Counsel to the Speaker, House of Commons
- Richard Mills, Esq., CB, late Comptroller and Auditor General
- Sir William Turner, D.C.L.

=== Companions of the Order of the Bath (CB) ===
Civil division

- Francis Alexander Campbell, Esq., of the Foreign Office
- Frederick Victor Dickins, Esq., Registrar to the University of London
- Lawrence Charles Edward Downing Dowdall, Esq., of the Irish Office
- George Vandeleur Fiddes, Esq., Colonial Office
- Robert O′Brien Furlong, Esq., Solicitor to the Inland Revenue Department, Ireland
- Lieutenant-Colonel Michael Clare Garcia, Inspector-General of Military Prisons
- Henry Paul Harvey, Esq., of the War Office
- Charles Prestwood Lucas, Esq., Assistant Under-Secretary of State, Colonial Office
- Malcolm McNeill, Esq., Chairman of the Local Government Board for Scotland
- Lieutenant-Colonel George Tindall Plunkett, Royal Engineers, Director of the Science and Art Department, Dublin

== Order of the Star of India ==
=== Knight Commander of the Order of the Star of India (KCSI) ===
- Charles Montgomery Rivaz, Esq., CSI, Ordinary Member of the Council of the Governor General of India

=== Companion of the Order of the Star of India (CSI) ===
- Frederick Styles Philpin Lely, Esq., Indian Civil Service
- John Ontario Miller, Esq., Indian Civil Service
- George Robert Irwin, Esq., Indian Civil Service
- William Robert Bright, Esq., Indian Civil Service

== Order of Saint Michael and Saint George ==
=== Knight Grand Cross of the Order of St Michael and St George (GCMG) ===
- Sir John Forrest, LL.D, KCMG, Premier and Colonial Treasurer of Western Australia, on the occasion of the Federation of the Australian Colonies

=== Knight Commander of the Order of St Michael and St George (KCMG) ===
- Brigadier-General Frederick John Dealtry Lugard, CB, DSO, High Commissioner for the Northern Nigeria Protectorate
- Sir Henry Nevill Dering, Baronet, CB, Her Majesty's Envoy Extraordinary and Minister Plenipotentiary to the United States of Brazil
- The Honourable William Augustus Curzon Barrington, Her Majesty's Envoy and Minister Plenipotentiary to the Argentine Republic
- John Gordon Kennedy, Esq., Her Majesty's Envoy Extraordinary and Minister Plenipotentiary at the Court of His Majesty the King of Romania
- Colonel Herbert Jekyll, Royal Engineers, CMG, Secretary to the Royal Commission for the Paris Universal International Exhibition of 1900
- The Honourable Sir James Robert Dickson, DCL, CMG, Chief Secretary of Queensland, on the occasion of the Federation of the Australian Colonies
- William McMillan, Esq., formerly Colonial Treasurer of New South Wales, Chairman of the Finance Committee of the Australian Federal Convention, on the occasion of the Federation of the Australian Colonies
- Josiah Henry Symon, Esq., QC, formerly Attorney-General of South Australia, Chairman of the Judiciary Committee of the Australian Federal Convention, on the occasion of the Federation of the Australian Colonies

=== Companion of the Order of St Michael and St George (CMG) ===
- Donald Keith McDowell, Esq., Principal Medical Officer of the West Africa Frontier Force
- Colonel Gerald Charles Kitson, lately Commandant of the Royal Military College, Kingston, Canada
- Lieutenant-Colonel D la Cherois Thomas Irwin, formerly Inspector of Artillery in Canada, Secretary of the Canadian Patriotic Fund
- Maximilian Frank Simon, Esq., MD, on retirement as Principal Civil Medical Officer of the Straits Settlements
- William Shelford, Esq., MICE, Consulting Engineer for West African Railways
- William Matthews, Esq., MICE, Consulting Engineer for Harbour Work in the Colonies
- Francis Alfred Cooper, Esq., Director of Public Works of the Island of Ceylon
- Ralph Champneys Williams, Esq., Colonial Secretary of the Island of Barbados
- Alfredo Naudi, Esq., LL.D, Crown Advocate of the Island of Malta
- Thomas Robertson Marsh, Esq., on retirement as Head of the Engineering and Contract Branches of the Office for the Crown Agents for the Colonies
- Charles Clive Bigham, Esq., Honorary Attaché to Her Majesty's Legation at Beijing, attached to Admiral Seymour's force
- Charles William Campbell, Esq., Her Majesty's Vice-Consul at Shanghai, attached to Admiral Seymour's force
- Pelham Laird Warren, Esq., Her Majesty's Consul-General at Hankou
- William Richard Carles, Esq., Her Majesty's Consul at Tianjin
- Everard Duncan Home Fraser, Esq., Her Majesty's Consul at Zhenjiang
- Edmund Robert Spearman, Esq., Assistant Secretary to the Royal Commission for the Paris Universal International Exhibition of 1900
- Lionel Earle, Esq., Assistant Secretary to the Royal Commission for the Paris Universal International Exhibition of 1900
- Herbert Hughes, Esq., for services in connection with International Industrial Conferences
- Edwin Gordon Blackmore, Esq., Clerk of the Legislative Council and Clerk of the Parliaments of South Australia, Clerk of the Australian Federal Convention, on the occasion of the Federation of the Australian Colonies
- Robert Randolph Garran, Esq., MA, Barrister, New South Wales, Secretary to the Drafting Committee of the Australian Federal Convention, on the occasion of the Federation of the Australian Colonies

== Order of the Indian Empire ==
=== Knights Grand Commander of the Order of the Indian Empire (GCIE) ===
- Major General Sir Edwin Henry Hayter Collen, KCIE, CB, Military Member of the Council of the Governor General of India
- Maharao Raja Sir Raghubir Singh Bahadur, of Bundi

=== Knights Commander of the Order of the Indian Empire (KCIE) ===
- Alexander Frederick Douglas Cunningham, Esq., CIE, Indian Civil Service
- Henry Evan Murchison James, Esq., CIE, Indian Civil Service

=== Honorary Knight Commander of the Order of the Indian Empire ===
- Colonel Eduardo Augusto Rodrigues Galhardo, Governor-General of Portuguese India

=== Companion of the Order of the Indian Empire (CIE) ===
- Mian Bhure Singh, of Chamba
- Captain Walter Somerville Goodridge, Royal Navy, Director of the Royal Indian Marine
- Lieutenant-Colonel Solomon Charles Frederick Peile, Indian Staff Corps
- Bertram Prior Standen, Esq., Indian Civil Service
- Henry Alexander Sim, Esq., Indian Civil Service
- Major James Robert Dunlop Smith, Indian Staff Corps
- Major John Crimmin, VC, Indian Medical Service
- Major Granville Henry Loch, Indian Staff Corps
- Fardunji Kuvarji Tarapurvala, Public Works Department, Executive Engineer, Ahmedabad
- Babu Kalinath Mitter, laletly Member of the Council of the Lieutenant-Governor of Bengal for making Laws and Regulations
- Frederick William Latimer Esq., Assistant Private Secretary to His Excellency the Viceroy of India
- William Jameson Soulsby, Esq., CB, Secretary to the Mansion House Indian Famine Relief Funds in 1877, 1897, and 1900
