= Chris Wood (diplomat) =

British diplomat

Chris Wood CMG
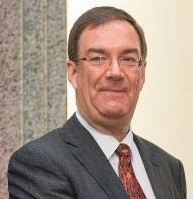

British Consul General to Shanghai
- In office 2019–2023

Representative, British Office Taipei
- In office 2013–2016

Minister, British Embassy Beijing
- In office 2008–2012

British Consul General to Guangzhou
- In office 2003–2006

Personal details
- Born: January 19, 1959 (age 67) Wolverhampton, United Kingdom
- Education: Fitzwilliam College, Cambridge

Christopher Terence Wood CMG (19 January 1959) is a retired British diplomat who served latterly as the British Consul General to Shanghai (2019-2023). His previous assignments included Deputy Head of the EU Delegation to China (2016–19), Representative, British Office Taipei from 2013 to 2016, Minister, British Embassy Beijing (2008–2012), Director for the Americas, Foreign and Commonwealth Office (2007–2008) and the British Consul-General to Guangzhou (2003–2006).

A native of West Midlands, England, Wood was educated in the county, and graduated from the University of Cambridge in 1981, in which year he entered the FCO. In addition to the diplomatic service, Wood has also worked in other government departments including the Cabinet Office, the Department of Environment and on secondment to the Government of British Hong Kong. Wood undertook Chinese language training through the FCO in 1982–84, and has worked variously in Hong Kong and in the British missions in Guangzhou and Beijing. Wood then served in Taiwan as the British head of mission there, dealing with the Taiwan–United Kingdom relations, during which time the British Trade and Cultural Office (BTCO), predecessor of the British Office Taipei, was renamed.

== Early years ==
Chris Wood was born in Wolverhampton, Staffordshire on 19 January 1959. He was educated at Cotwall End Primary School and High Arcal Grammar School in the same county. When he was 16, Wood took part in career advice planning, which encouraged him to consider entering the diplomatic service. In 1981, Wood graduated with the degree of B.A. (Hons) in Modern and Medieval Languages from Fitzwilliam College, Cambridge, where he studied French and German.

== Career ==
Wood joined the FCO right after his graduation in 1981, working initially as Desk Officer and Third Secretary in the Western European Department. Between 1982 and 1984, he undertook language training in Chinese in both London (at the School of Oriental and African Studies – SOAS) and at the Ministry of Defence Chinese Language School in Hong Kong. He was then seconded to the Hong Kong Government as Assistant Political Adviser, taking part in the Sino-British Negotiations regarding the Transfer of sovereignty over Hong Kong. After returning to the FCO in 1987, he was assigned to the Hong Kong Department to head its Future Section, then he worked in the Security Co-ordination Department from 1989 to 1991.

From 1992 to 1998, Wood worked in the Department of the Environment (subsequently the Department of the Environment, Transport and the Regions), where his roles included head of the European Community Branch, head of the International Air Pollution Branch, and Private Secretary to the Ministers of State (1995–1998). During his time in the Economic & Domestic Secretariat, Cabinet Office (1998–2001), he served as secretary to several Cabinet Committees including those on Public expenditure, economic affairs, environmental issues, local government and welfare reform. From 2001 to 2002, he became Head of International & Policy Team, Deputy Prime Minister’s Central Policy Group, Cabinet Office (subsequently the Office of the Deputy Prime Minister). He returned to the FCO in 2003, being posted as British Consul-General in Guangzhou from 2003–2006 and working as Director for the Americas in the FCO London from 2007–2008. He returned to China as Minister and Deputy Head of Mission at the British Embassy in Beijing from 2009–2012. He was Head of the British Trade & Cultural Office (subsequently British Office) in Taiwan from 2013 until 2016.

Wood was Deputy Head of the EU Delegation to China and Mongolia from September 2016 until March 2019 when British diplomats became no longer eligible to represent the EU.

Wood was appointed Companion of the Order of St Michael and St George (CMG) in the 2024 New Year Honours for services to British foreign policy.

Diplomatic posts
Preceded by John Edwards	British Consul-General in Shanghai; 2019–present	Succeeded by incumbent
Preceded by David Campbell	Representative of the British Office Taipei; 2013–2016	Succeeded by Damion Potter
Preceded by Stephen Lillie	British Consul-General in Guangzhou; 2003–2006	Succeeded by Brian Davidson
