= Donald Keith McDowell =

British Physician and Chief Medical Officer (1867–1940)

Donald Keith McDowell CMG OBE
- Born: 16 September 1867
- Died: 23 December 1940 (aged 73)
- Education: University of Edinburgh
- Occupations: Physician and Chief Medical Officer for various states
- Children: 1

Donald Keith McDowell (16 September 1867 – 23 December 1940) was a British physician who was the Chief Medical Officer for the Northern Territories of the Gold Coast, Northern Nigeria Protectorate, and the Straits Settlements and the Federated Malay States.

== Early life and education ==
McDowell was born on 16 September 1867, the son of Surgeon-Colonel Edmond Greswold McDowell. He was educated at Berkhamsted School and at University of Edinburgh, where he took the diplomas of L.R.C.P. and L.R.C.S. He also obtained the degree of Licentiate of the Faculty of Pharmacy (L.F.P.) and the Society of Apothecaries (L.F.P.&S).

== Career ==
McDowell began his career in the Leeward Islands where in 1894 he was appointed Government Medical Officer. After serving for two years, he was transferred to the West African Service at the Gold Coast as assistant Colonial Surgeon. Soon after his arrival, he acted as Medical Officer in charge of the Hausas during the Ashanti Expedition of 1895 and was awarded the Ashanti Star. In the following year he was attached to the Lagos Expeditionary Force and was awarded the medal and clasp. In 1897, he was attached to Lord Roberts' staff as medical officer in charge of colonial troops at Queen Victoria's Jubilee celebrations and received the Jubilee Medal. The following year, he was acting as Cantonment Magistrate at Kumasi. In 1898, he was appointed Chief Medical Officer of the Northern Territories of the Gold Coast. After acting as Principal Medical Officer to the West African Frontier Force, Northern Nigeria, he was confirmed Principal Medical Officer of the Colony in 1900. In that year, he accompanied the Ashanti Field Force as Principal Medical Officer and was again involved in combat operations for which he was twice mentioned in despatches and was awarded the CMG. In 1902, he served on a committee at the Colonial Office, London, to devise methods to improve the West African Medical Service.

In 1903, he went to Singapore where he served as Principal Civil Medical Officer, Straits Settlements, and two years later served additionally as Inspector-General of Hospitals and Medical Institutions, Federated Malay States. In Singapore he founded the Straits Settlements and Federated Malay States Government Medical School (later known as the King Edward VII College of Medicine) in 1905. He established new hospitals at Passir Panjang and Balestier Road, and a maternity hospital at Sepoy Lines. He is also credited with improving the quarantine facilities in Singapore, and procedures for registration of local medical staff. In 1910, he left Singapore to take over similar duties in the Federated Malay States, retiring in the same year. After returning to England, in 1915 he was in charge of the Tooting Military Hospital with the rank of major in the Army Medical Corps.

== Personal life and death ==
McDowell married Bertha Bailey in 1901 and they had a daughter.

McDowell died on 23 December 1940.

== Honours ==
McDowell was awarded the Ashanti Star in 1895, and in 1897 he received the Jubilee Medal. He was appointed Companion of the Order of St Michael and St George (CMG) in the 1901 New Year Honours. He was appointed Officer of the Order of the British Empire (OBE) in the 1919 Birthday Honours.
