= Michael Cavenagh Gillett =

British diplomat

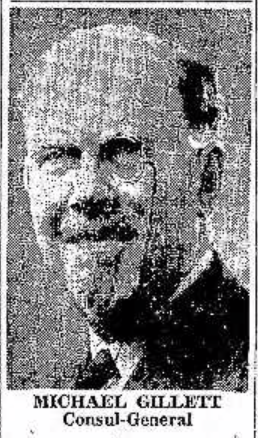
Sir Michael Gillett in 1955

Sir Michael Cavenagh Gillett KBE CMG (12 July 1907 – 20 January 1971) was a British diplomat.

== Education ==
Gillett was educated at the Royal Naval College, Osborne and Royal Navy College, Dartmouth and then at Manchester University.

== Career in China ==
Gillett was appointed a student interpreter in the British China Consular Service in January 1929 and served as Vice-Consul in Canton (now Guangzhou), Hankow, Nanking and Kashgar. He was promoted to the rank of Consul in 1937 and was Acting Consul General in Kashgar from June 1938 and Acting Consul at Tengyueh (now Tengchong) from 1940 to 1942. He served as Chinese Secretary to the Legation in Chunking (now Chongqing) in 1942 and then transferred back to Kashgar in that year. He was appointed deputy consul general in Shanghai in 1947 and then Consul General in 1948 serving to November that year. He served in China until 1953.

== Later career ==
Gillett served as British Consul General in Los Angeles between 1954 and 1957 and then as British Ambassador to Afghanistan from 1957 to 1963. He retired in 1963.

== Awards ==
He was awarded a CMG in 1951 and was knighted in 1962.
