= Sidney Barton =

British diplomat (1876–1946)

Sir Sidney Barton GBE KCVO CMG
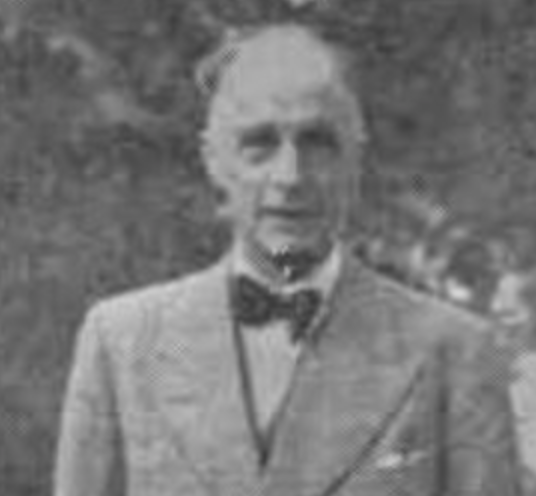

British Consul General, Shanghai
- In office 24 August 1922 – 21 May 1929
- Preceded by: Sir James Jamieson
- Succeeded by: Sir John Fitzgerald Brenan

British Minister to Ethiopia
- In office 1929–1937
- Preceded by: Sir Sydney Waterlow
- Succeeded by: Sir Robert George Howe

Personal details
- Born: 26 November 1876 Exeter, Devon
- Died: 20 January 1946 (aged 69) London, England
- Education: St Paul's School, London

Sir Sidney Barton (26 November 1876 – 20 January 1946) was a British barrister and diplomat, serving as consul-general in Shanghai and as minister to Ethiopia.

== Early life ==
Sidney Barton was born in Exeter, Devonshire, England on 26 November 1876, the fourth son of Captain James Barton and Mary Barbara Barclay. The Bartons were a distinguished Anglo-Irish family that came to Ireland from Lancashire in 1599 with the Earl of Essex, gaining lands in County Fermanagh.

Barton was descended through his mother from the Barclay baronets, a title in the Baronetage of Nova Scotia, his grandfather being the 10th Baronet, Sir David Edward Barclay of Pierston. Sir Colville Barclay, a fellow diplomat and third son of the twelfth Baronet, was a cousin.

Barton was educated at St Paul's School, London.

== Career in China ==
Barton entered the Diplomatic Service in the Chinese Consular Service on 16 September 1895 and was posted to the legation in Peking as a student interpreter. From 1899 to 1901 he was posted on special service to the British territory of Weihaiwei. When the Boxer Rebellion erupted in 1900 culminating in the siege of the foreign legations, Barton took part in the Eight-Nation Alliance relief efforts as an interpreter and assistant political officer and was awarded the China War Medal for his actions. On 14 November 1901 he was appointed Vice-Consul to the Consul in Tienstin, Lionel Charles Hopkins.

In 1910 he was admitted as a barrister-at-law to Middle Temple. Returning to China, on 12 May 1911 Barton was appointed Chinese Secretary to the Minister to China Sir John Jordan at the Legation in Peking. For his service in Peking, on 6 June 1913 he was made a Companion of the Order of St Michael and St George (CMG).

In 1922 he was appointed Consul-General to Shanghai. Shanghai was a difficult posting, involving managing the British government's approach to the Shanghai Municipal Council and the significant 'Shanghailander' British community. Barton was known as being "notoriously pro-settler" despite being awarded the Knight Commander of the Order of the British Empire (KBE) on 3 July 1926 following his efforts to calm tensions after the May 30 Movement of 1925. As a consequence, the Foreign Office was keen to replace Barton with someone more amenable to better relations with Chiang Kai-shek's new government.

== Career in Ethiopia ==
In June 1929 Barton was formally appointed Minister to the Empire of Ethiopia. Barton attended the Coronation of the Emperor Haile Selassie on 2 November 1930 in St. George's Cathedral, Addis Ababa and for his assistance to the HRH Prince Henry, Duke of Gloucester, who was King George V's representative at the coronation, was made a Knight Commander of the Royal Victorian Order (KCVO) on 30 October 1930. Barton was also presented by the Emperor with his Coronation Medal and the Grand Cross of the Order of the Star of Ethiopia.

Barton was British minister in Addis Ababa during the Second Italo-Ethiopian War and ordered a detachment of British Indian Army troops from the 14th Punjab Regiment to defend the legation during this period while providing space for 2000 refugees. Barton found himself frustrated by the lack of assistance given to Ethiopia in the face of Italian aggression and worked to ensure that the Emperor and his family were able to safely escape to exile. For his efforts during the war Foreign Secretary Sir Anthony Eden stated to the House of Commons on 4 May 1936 that his "conduct of affairs throughout has been beyond all praise" and on 7 May King Edward VIII sent a personal message to Barton expressing his "appreciation of the manner in which he discharged his responsibilities for the interests of British nationals and other foreign nationals in Abyssinia, who have sought his protection during the period of difficulty and trying experiences of recent days."

== Retirement ==
After returning safely to London, Barton retired and thereafter spent time working for the exiled Haile Selassie and his family. He was appointed as a Knight Grand Cross of the Order of the British Empire (GBE) on 1 January 1936, while Lady Barton was made a Commander of the Order of the British Empire (CBE) on 11 May 1937. He died in January 1946 and is buried at Muckross Church near the family home at The Waterfoot, Pettigo.

== Family ==
Barton married Mary Ethel Winifred MacEwen, daughter of Alexander Palmer MacEwen, on 23 July 1904 and had two sons, James Alexander Barclay Barton (1905–1940) and Hugh David MacEwen Barton (1911–1989), and two daughters, Marion Barton and Barbara Esmé Barton. His youngest son went on to be chairman and managing director of Jardine, Matheson & Co. in Hong Kong.

== Honours ==
- Knight Grand Cross of the Order of the British Empire (GBE; 1936)
- Knight Commander of the Royal Victorian Order (KCVO; 1930)
- Knight Commander of the Order of the British Empire (KBE; 1926 Birthday Honours)
- Companion of the Order of St Michael and St George (CMG; 1913)
- China War Medal (1900)
- King George V Silver Jubilee Medal (1935)
- King George VI Coronation Medal (1937)
- Haile Selassie Coronation Medal (1930)
- Grand Cross of the Order of the Star of Ethiopia

Diplomatic posts
Preceded by Sir Everard Duncan Home Fraser	Consul-General of the United Kingdom in Shanghai; 1922–1929	Succeeded by John Fitzgerald Brenan
Preceded by Sydney Waterlow	Minister of the United Kingdom to Ethiopia; 1929–1936	No representation due to Italian occupation
