= George Jamieson (diplomat) =

British diplomat and judge (1843–1920)

George Jamieson CMG
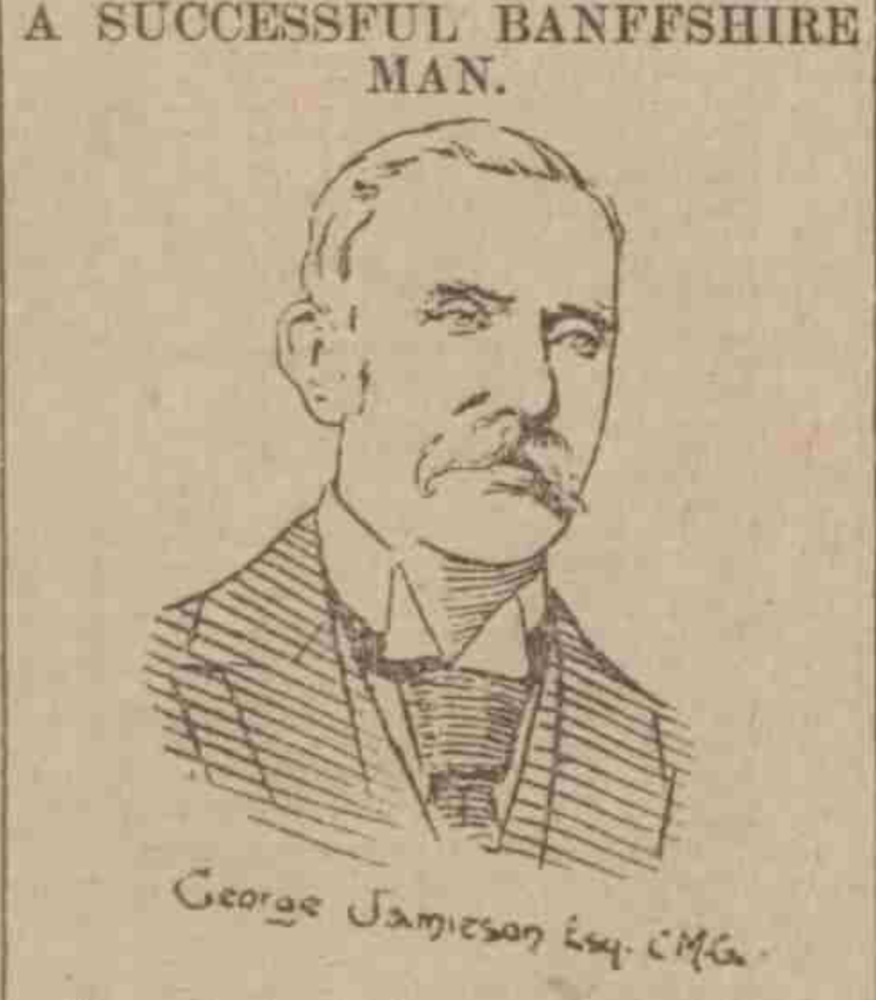

Judge, British Supreme Court for China
- In office 1891–1897
- Preceded by: Robert Mowat
- Succeeded by: Frederick Samuel Augustus Bourne

British Consul-General Shanghai
- In office 1897–1899
- Preceded by: Nicholas John Hannen
- Succeeded by: Byron Brenan

Personal details
- Born: 5 February 1843 Banffshire, Scotland
- Died: 30 December 1920 (aged 77) London, England
- Relatives: Hugh Gaitskell (grandson)

George Jamieson CMG (1843 – 1920) was a British diplomat and judge who served in China. His last position before retirement from government service was as British Consul-General in Shanghai.

== Early life ==
Jamieson was born on 5 February 1843, in Crannoch, Grange, Banffshire (Banffshire is now part of Moray and Crannoch is now listed as part of Keith, Moray), Scotland, the son of Alexander Jamieson and Helen Pirie. He was educated at Grange Parish School, before attending Aberdeen University from which he graduated 1864 with mathematical honours, gaining also the Boxill prize.

== Consular career ==
Jamieson joined the British China consular service as a student interpreter in 1864. In 1867, Jamieson was appointed a 2nd Class Assistant and in 1868 appointed Acting Consul in Tainan, Taiwan. In 1869, he was appointed Acting Law Secretary of the British Supreme Court for China and Japan when Robert Mowat went on long leave to study for the bar. Jamieson was originally admitted to the bar of the Inner Temple in 1871 during long leave at home in England, but was in 1880 called to the bar of the Middle Temple. He served in various consular positions in China. In 1887, he was appointed acting Assistant Judge of the Supreme Court in Shanghai and the following year transferred to Yokohama as Acting Judge of the British Court for Japan

In 1891, as part of an amalgamation of consular and judicial positions, he was appointed Consul in Shanghai and at the same time Judge of the British Supreme Court for China and Japan. Nicholas Hannen was appointed Consul General and Chief Justice.

In 1897, the amalgamation of consular and judicial positions was ended. Jamieson was appointed as Consul-General in Shanghai, replacing Hannen, and relieved of his position as Judge of the Supreme Court. Hannen continued as Chief Justice and Frederick Samuel Augustus Bourne was appointed as Judge to replace Jamieson.

He was made a Companion of the Order of St Michael and St George in 1897.

== Retirement from Consular Service ==
Jamieson retired from consular service due to ill health at the end of April 1899. After retirement, he became a director of the British and Chinese Corporation, the Chinese Central Railways and Yangtse Valley Company. He also helped establish a "China League" due to disagreements with the policies of the China Association. After this was patched up, he served as the president of the China Association from 1914 to 1917. In 1916, on the nomination of the China Association, he was appointed a governor of the School of Oriental Studies, now the School of Oriental and African Studies (SOAS), in London.

== Death ==
Jamieson died in London on 30 December 1920.

Before his death, Jamieson completed a book, Chinese Family and Commercial Law, based on translations that he had prepared many years before of sections of China’s General Code of Laws. The book, which also included Jamieson’s translations of various cases from the International Mixed Court, was published in 1921.

== Publications ==
Jamieson published the following book:

- Chinese Family and Commercial Law
