= Former Consulate-General of the United Kingdom, Shanghai =

Coordinates: 31.2443°N 121.4842°E

- Traditional Chinese: 英國駐上海總領事館
- Simplified Chinese: 英国驻上海总领事馆
Transcriptions
Standard Mandarin
- Hanyu Pinyin: Yīngguó zhù Shànghǎi Zǒnglǐngshìguǎn
- Wade–Giles: Ying-kuo chu Shang-Hai Tsung-ling-shih-kuan

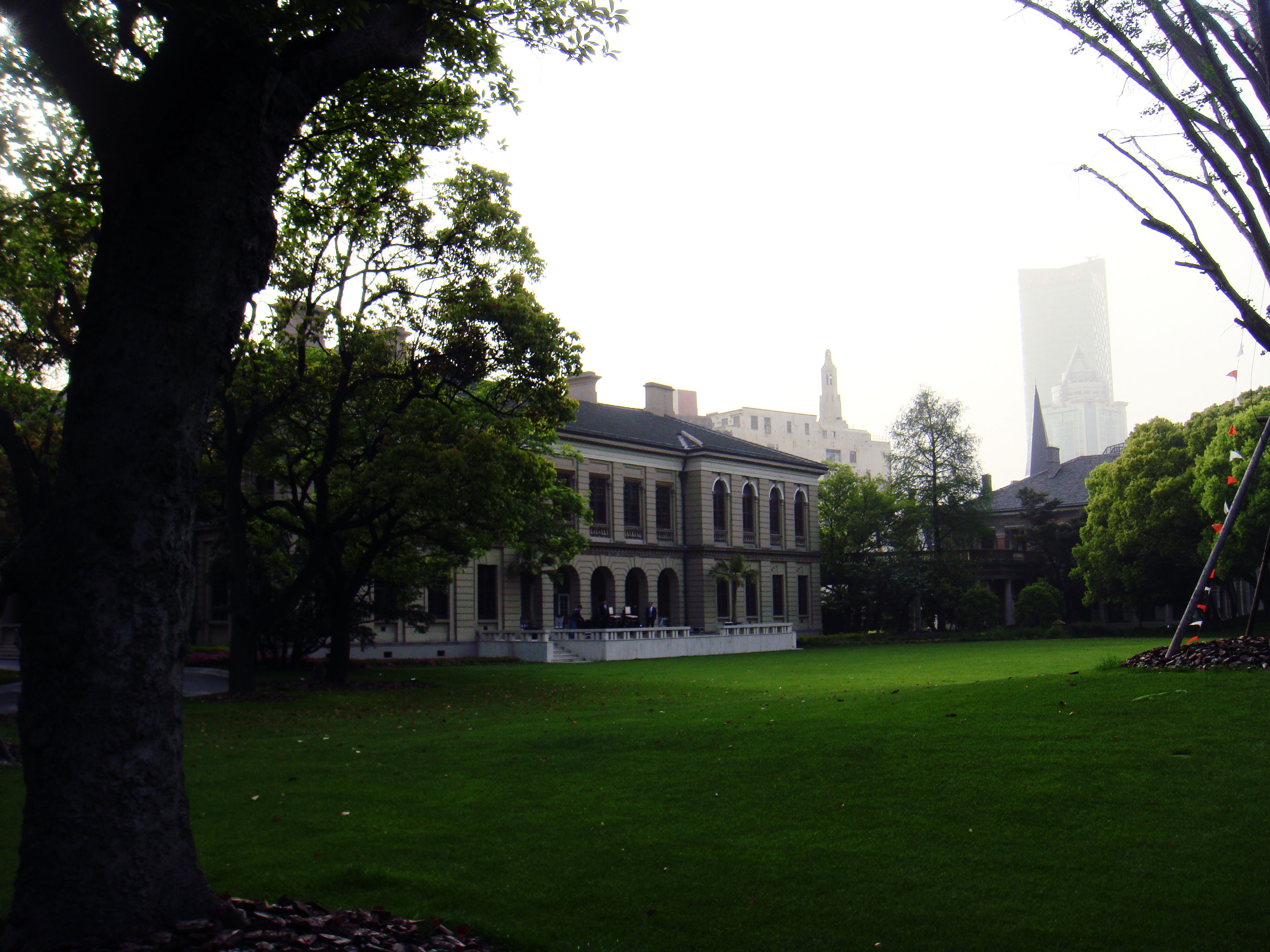
Former Consulate-General of the United Kingdom, Shanghai

The Former Consulate-General of the United Kingdom (英国驻上海总领事馆) building located in Shanghai, China, is one of the oldest buildings on the Bund.

It is housed in a compound that housed a number of buildings used by the British Consulate-General. The building served as the home of the Consulate-General and British Supreme Court for China until 8 December 1941 when the Japanese occupied the Shanghai International Settlement at the beginning of the Pacific War. The British Supreme Court for China was abolished under the British–Chinese Treaty for the Relinquishment of Extra-Territorial Rights in China. After the war, the Consulate-General returned to the site and remained until 1949 when Britain withdrew its consular staff with the communist occupation of Shanghai. The consulate re-opened in 1954 and was closed again in 1967 during the Cultural Revolution.

== Buildings ==
The main building on the site appears to be one building but is in fact two buildings. The building that can be seen from the Bund is the former offices of the Consulate-General of the United Kingdom, and the offices of the British Supreme Court for China and Japan. The building and entrance that can be seen from Yuanmingyuan Road is the former court building of the British Supreme Court for China and Japan. The main court was located on the second floor of this building.

Also located at the Northern end of the consular compound is the former residence of the British consul-general. To the west of this is the old Union Church.

== Construction ==
The Supreme Court building was completed in 1871 and the Consulate Office building, built in the Renaissance Revival, was completed in 1873. The later building replaced the previous consulate building that burnt down on 28 December 1870. The Supreme Court building was extended in 1913 to add wings on the north and south to house new courts (south wing) and consular offices (north wing). The total area of both buildings is 38,559 square meters (415,050 sq ft).

As the new Consulate was being built the North China Herald of 1 June 1872 reported on a foundation stone laying ceremony and described the building and offices:

The new building is, we understand, to be rebuilt principally on the old foundations, and the outline of-the original building to be maintained; the style of architecture, however, being made to harmonise with that of the new Supreme Court building.

The rooms will of course be also rearranged, so that the Court offices may adjoin that building, and the Consulate offices be concentrated in the opposite wing. Thus, on the lower floor, south side, will be the public Court offices, and at the S. E. corner the Police Court; The Magistrate’s office will be in the centre with a fireproof room adjoining, for the safe custody of the legal records. And on the north side will be the Consular Shipping offices with another fire-proof room for the custody of the Consular records.

On the upper floor, south side, will the Judge’s offices, immediately above those of the Clerks; in the middle, immediately above the Magistrate will be the Consul’s office, and on the north side, above the Shipping offices, those of the Vice-Consul and the Consular staff.

The entrance to the building will be from either end of a passage running through it from north to south and from the centre of which will spring a stone staircase, branching to the right and left to the upper floor.

According to the same article, the foundation stone that was laid read:

Foundation stone laid by Agnes Goodwin.
Sir Edmund Hornby Walther H Medhurst,
Kt, Chief Judge Consul
Charles W Goodwin Chaloner Alabaster,
Asst. Judge Vice-Counsul
Robt. A Mowat
Law Secretary
Robert H. Boyce, Surveyor, H. M. Office of Works, London, Architect

== Post-consulate use ==
In the early 1980s the compound was used as the site of the Friendship Store, a store for foreign tourists to buy Chinese products. The Friendship Store was located in the former Assistant Judge's House. A new building was built at the southern end of the compound and opened in later 1985.

The compound then became the offices of various Shanghai government bodies. During the 1990s the building was abandoned and became very dilapidated. In the mid-2000s, the Shanghai government commenced a project to revitalize the Yuanmingyuan Road area, including the consulate. The project included tearing down both the old Assistant Judge's house and the Friendship Store built in 1985.

The compound has now been fully restored under the name 33 Waitanyuan, and converted to an entertainment and dining venue managed by Hong Kong and Shanghai Hotels Group's 50% owned Shanghai Peninsula Hotel. It is now used for functions.

Photographs of the restored buildings (and some of the rooms pre-restoration) may be found online.

A plaque on the Yuanmingyuan Road entrance describes the compound and buildings as follows:

Waitanyuan 33 33 Waitanyuan the former British Consulate General complex is located at the confluence of the Huangpu River and Suzhou Creek and with a total area of almost 23,000 square meters, extends from Zhongshan Dong Xi Road in the east to Yuanmingyuan Road in the west. This was the starting point of the development of the Shanghai concession. The construction of this region began in 1849. There are five buildings in the Complex which have been ranked as key historical sites and cultural relics under state protection, including the former British Consulate General (Building 1), the official residence of the former British Consulate General (Building 2), the former Church Apartments (Building 3), the former Union Church (Building 4) and the former Shanghai Rowing club. These five buildings are important parts of the architecture of the Bund and also boast 27 ancient and famous trees around its magnificent gardens.

== See also ==
- List of consuls-general of the United Kingdom in Shanghai
- British Supreme Court for China
