= Henry McAleavy =

English sinologist

Henry McAleavy (1911/1912–1968) was an English sinologist, Reader in Oriental Laws at the School of Oriental and African Studies.

== Life ==
Henry McAleavy was born to an Irish Roman Catholic working-class family in Manchester. His father died when he was a child, and his mother brought him up while working in a cotton mill. After leaving school he worked as a clerk in a solicitor's office before getting a place at Manchester University to read classics. He went on to study Chinese at Trinity College, Cambridge. From 1935 he taught English in central China and Peking. In 1940 he joined the information department of the British Embassy in Shanghai. In 1941 he married Ayako, a writer for Japanese newspapers.

After the war he joined the School of Oriental and African Studies. In 1960 he went to Japan on study leave, acquiring material on modern Japanese and Chinese history from the Japanese viewpoint.

McAleavy recommended paying attention to the 'unofficial history' of attitudes revealed in popular novels and newspapers.

== Works ==
- Wang Tʻao (1828?-1890) the life and writings of a displaced person, 1953
- (tr.) That Chinese woman: the life of Sai-chin-hua by Sai Jinhua. London: Allen & Unwin, 1959
- Su Man-shu (1884-1913): a Sino-Japanese genius, 1960
- (tr.) The Chinese bigamy of M. David Winterlea: a Manchu-Edwardian fantasy, 1961
- A dream of Tartary; the origins and misfortunes of Henry P'u Yi, 1963
- The modern history of China, 1967
- Black flags in Vietnam: the story of a Chinese intervention, 1968
