= Former Foreign YMCA Building =

Building in Shanghai, China

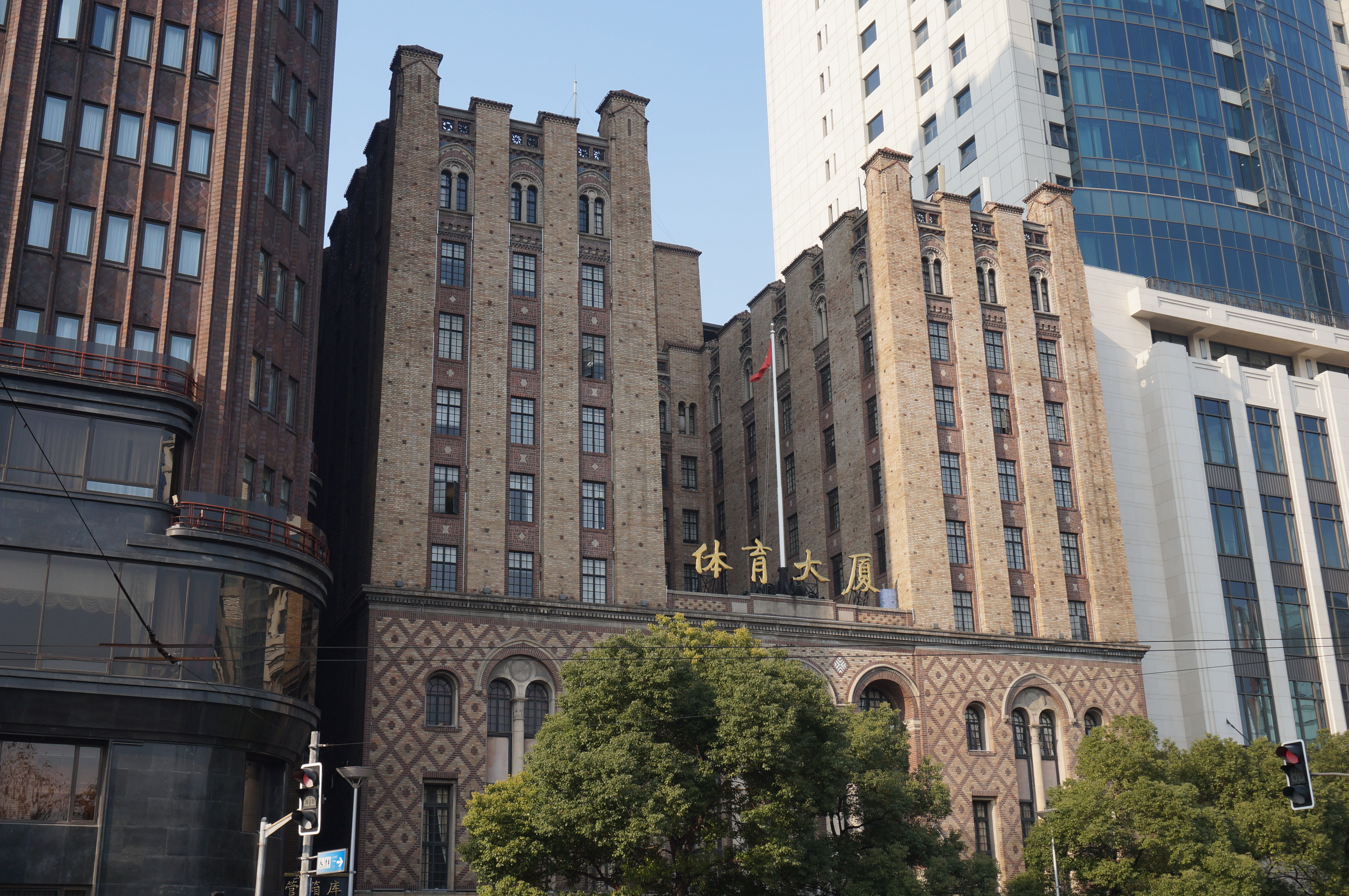
- The building's exterior in 2013
- Interactive map of the Former Foreign YMCA Building area

General information
- Location: Shanghai, China

The Former Foreign YMCA Building is an historic building in Shanghai's Huangpu District, in China.
