= Daniel Brooke Robertson =

British diplomat (1810–1881)

Sir Daniel Brooke Robertson Knt KCMG CB

British consul-general in Shanghai
- In office 1854–1858
- Preceded by: Sir Rutherford Alcock
- Succeeded by: Sir Harry Parkes

Personal details
- Born: 1810
- Died: 27 March 1881 (aged 70 or 71) London
- Occupation: Diplomat

Sir Daniel Brooke Robertson (1810 – 27 March 1881) was a British diplomat who served as British consul-general in Shanghai from 1854 to 1858.

== Early life and education ==
Robertson was born in 1810, the eldest son of Daniel Robertson of Struan, Perthshire, Scotland, and Emily née Brooke Clarke. He trained as a barrister and was called to the Bar by Lincoln's Inn in 1840.

== Career ==
In 1842, Robertson was employed in the mixed commission for the settlement of the claims of the British Legion against the Portuguese Government. He then joined the China consular service and in 1843 was appointed vice-consul at Shanghai, while also acting as Danish consul there in 1848. After serving as acting consul at Ningpo for a year he returned to Shanghai as vice-consul in 1851. In 1853, he was appointed consul at Amoy and in the following year was acting consul at Shanghai, while on several occasions he served temporarily as acting consul in Canton.

In 1854, Robertson was called upon to take charge of the superintendency at Hong Kong during the absence of the British plenipotentiary. He returned as consul to Shanghai later that year while also acting as Danish consul. In 1860, he was transferred to the consulate at Canton, and was appointed official receiver of the indemnity payable at the ports of Canton and Swatow under the terms of the Convention of Peking. In 1861, he was appointed British commissioner in the territory of Kowloon, China, and also acted for some time as one of the commissioners for Canton during its occupation by allied forces. In 1872, he was appointed consul at Canton, and in 1877, consul-general at Shanghai but did not take up the post due to poor health, retiring later that year.

== Personal life and death ==
Robertson married Ellen Nutter (née Aingell) in 1839. She died in 1852. Their only son Daniel Brooke Robertson was a member of the British consular service in Japan who rose to the senior consular appointment there, and died suddenly aged about 48.

Robertson died on 27 March 1881 in London.

== Honours ==
Robertson received two knighthoods. He was appointed Knight Bachelor by patent in 1862, and was appointed Knight Commander of the Order of St Michael and St George (KCMG) in 1879. He was appointed Companion of the Order of the Bath (CB) in 1865.

== See also ==
- China–United Kingdom relations

Diplomatic posts
Preceded by Sir Rutherford Alcock	British consul-general in Shanghai; 1854–1858	Succeeded by Sir Harry Parkes
