= Everard Fraser =

British diplomat (1859–1922)

Sir Everard Fraser KCMG

British Consul-General in Shanghai
- In office 1911–1922
- Preceded by: Sir Pelham Laird Warren
- Succeeded by: James William Jamieson

Personal details
- Born: 27 February 1859
- Died: 20 March 1922 (aged 63) Shanghai
- Education: University of Aberdeen
- Occupation: Diplomat

Sir Everard Duncan Home Fraser (27 February 1859 – 20 March 1922) was a British diplomat who served as consul-general in Shanghai from 1911 to 1922.

== Early life and education ==
Fraser was born on 27 February 1859, the son of Lieut-Colonel R. W. Fraser. He was educated at the University of Aberdeen, Scotland.

== Career ==
Fraser joined the diplomatic service in 1880 as a student interpreter and went to China. In 1886, he was appointed acting consul at Foochow; in 1889 he was at Kiukiang; and then at Ichang, remaining in the post until 1891. From 1891 to 1892, he served as acting vice-consul at Chemulpo, Korea, and acting consul from 1892 to 1894, before he was promoted to first assistant in 1893.

In 1895, Fraser was transferred back to China at Canton where he was vice-consul and acting consul from 1895 to 1897. That year, he was promoted to vice-consul at Pagoda Island, and in 1899 served as consul at Chinkiang. After serving for a year at Foochow as acting consul, he was transferred to Hankow where he served first as acting consul-general from 1900 to 1901, and then as consul-general from 1901 to 1911. His final appointment was a consul-general in Shanghai, a post he held from 1911 to 1922.

In 1915, when the British Chamber of Commerce was established in Shanghai, he became its president. When he died in office in 1922, The Times reported that the whole foreign community and all the leading Chinese in the city attended his funeral.

No British subject in the history of our dealings with China has commanded greater repect and affection as Sir Everard Fraser, whom the North China Daily News rightly describes as head and shoulders above all his contemporaries in every respect.

— The Times

== Personal life and death ==
Fraser married Constance, daughter of A. W. Walkinshaw of Foochow, in 1899.

Fraser died on 20 March 1922 in Shanghai, aged 63.

== Honours ==
Fraser was appointed Companion of the Order of St Michael and St George (CMG) in the 1901 New Year Honours, and promoted to Knight Commander (KCMG) in the 1912 Birthday Honours.

== See also ==
- China–United Kingdom relations

Diplomatic posts
Preceded by Sir Pelham Laird Warren	British Consul-General in Shanghai; 1911–1922	Succeeded by James William Jamieson
