= Walter Perceval Yetts =

Walter Perceval Yetts CBE (25 April 1878 – 14 May 1957) was a British surgeon and sinologist. Born at Reading, England, he was educated at Bradfield College, London University and Lausanne University. He entered the Royal Navy Medical Service in 1903 and retired with the rank of staff surgeon in 1912. He was acting medical officer at the British legation in 1913 and served in the Royal Army Medical Corps during World War I. From 1920 to 1927 he was a medical officer in the Ministry of Health. In 1930 he made a major career change when he was appointed the first lecturer in Chinese art and archaeology at the School of Oriental Studies at London University. In 1932 he became Professor of Chinese Art and Archaeology at London University and held the post until his retirement in 1946.

Yetts's special fields of study were the Chinese bronzes and jades of the prehistoric period. He wrote numerous articles, while his books included:

- Chinese Bronzes (1925)
- The Cull Chinese Bronzes (1939)
- Ritual Bronzes of Ancient China (1942)

In 1929 he contributed three volumes to the monumental catalogue of the collection of Asian art of George Eumorfopoulos.

== Works ==
- Catalogue of the Chinese & Corean bronzes, sculpture, jades, jewellery and miscellaneous objects : The George Eumorfopoulos Collection. London : Benn, 1929–1932
  - Vol. 1 Bronzes: Ritual and other vessels, weapons, etc.
  - Vol. 2 Bronzes: Bells, drums, mirrors, etc.
- Arthur Christopher Moule & Yetts, W. Perceval: The Rulers of China 221 B.C. – A.D. 1949 Chronological Tables Compiled By A. C. Moule. With a Section on the Earlier Dynasties by W. Perceval Yetts. London: Routledge & Kegan Paul 1957 ("Yetts provides information of the rulers of China from 2100-249BC.")
