= Byron Brenan =

British diplomat (1847-1927)

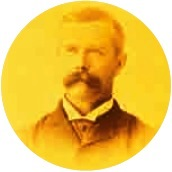

British Consul General, Shanghai
- In office 13 May 1899 – 5 July 1901
- Preceded by: George Jamieson
- Succeeded by: Sir Pelham Warren

Personal details
- Born: 7 December 1847 France
- Died: 28 February 1927 (aged 79) London, England

Byron Brenan CMG, (7 December 1847 – 28 February 1927), was a British diplomat who served in China from 1866. His last position before retirement was as British Consul General in Shanghai from 1899 to 1901.

Brenan had English and Irish ancestry. His second brother worked for Chinese Maritime Customs Service. One of his nephews John Fitzgerald Brenan was also a diplomat who also served as same British Consul General in Shanghai from 1930 to 1937.

Brenan joined UK Foreign Office in 1866 and served initially in Guangzhou, Shanghai, Beijing, Wuhu and Tianjin. He served as consul in Chefoo (now Yantai) from 1883 to 1885, and then served as British consul in Beijing and Tianjin from 1885 to 1893. In June 1886 he went to Hong Kong to represent the British Government, on a joint committee on opium and facilitated the signing of regulations on the management of western medicine in Hong Kong.

From 1893 to 1898 while serving as the British Consul General in Guangzhou, Brenan had to deal with response to rumours concerning the bubonic plague in Hong Kong and Sun Yat-sen's anti-Qing revolutionary movement. Later in 1897, Brenan negotiated with the Governor of Guangdong and Guangxi, Tan Zhonglin about the expansion of Hong Kong, which led to the signing of Convention for the Extension of Hong Kong Territory in 1898. In addition, in 1895, he was appointed by the British Government as a special commissioner to examine the trade situation of the UK in Far East and published in 1897 a "Report on the State of Trade at the Treaty Ports of China".

Brenan was appointed as British Consul-General in Shanghai in 1898 and took office in the following year. During his tenure, he assisted in the rescue of Kang Youwei during the 1898 Jiangsu coup. In 1899, he successfully negotiated with the Qing court to expand the total area of Shanghai International Settlement by more than three times its size to 33,503 acres. In order to honor his performance in Shanghai, the Shanghai Municipal Council on his retirement in July 1901, named a new road in the concession Brenan Road (now Changning Road). He continued to pay attention to Chinese affairs after he retired to the UK. He founded the China Society in 1889 and served as honorary secretary. He died in London in 1927, at the age of 79.

== English reference materials ==
- "The Opium Commission", The China Mail, 22 June 1886, p. 2.
- "Enquiry into the Conditions of British Trade with China", The Singapore Free Press and Mercantile Advertiser, 14 December 1895, p. 3.
- Brenan, Byron, Report on the State of Trade at the Treaty Ports of China. London: Her Majesty's Stationery Office, 1897.
- "The Treaty Ports of China", The Straits Times, 30 July 1897, p. 11.
- "Settlement Extension at Shanghai", The Singapore Free Press and Mercantile Advertiser, 18 May 1899, p. 6.
- The Straits Times, 23 January 1900, p. 2.
- "The China Crisis", The Singapore Free Press and Mercantile Advertiser, 6 October 1900, p. 3.
- The Singapore Free Press and Mercantile Advertiser, 11 July 1901, p. 2.
- The Singapore Free Press and Mercantile Advertiser, 12 July 1901, p. 2.
- The North China Herald, 17 July 1901.
- Crisp, Frederick Arthur, Visitation of England and Wales Vol. 10. Privately Printed, 1902.
- "The Chinese Commission", Eastern Daily Mail and Straits Morning Advertiser, 24 April 1906, p. 1.
- Edited by Wright, Arnold, Twentieth Century Impressions of Hongkong, Shanghai, and Other Treaty Ports of China: Their History, People, Commerce, Industries, and Resources. London: Lloyds Greater Britain Publishing Company, 1908.
- Ruvigny, The Marquis de, The Roll of Honour: A Biographical Record of All Members of His Majesty's Naval and Military Forces Who Have Fallen in the War Volume I. London: The Standard Art Book Company Limited, 1916.
- Lunt, Carroll, The China Who's Who 1922: A Biographical Dictionary. Shanghai: Kelly & Walsh, Limited, 1922.
- Journal of the Royal Society of Arts Vol 75. The Society, 1927.
- "Obituary - Mr Byron Brenan", The South China Morning Post, 5 April 1927, p. 8.
- "The Late Mr. Byron Brenan - Founded the China Society - Untimely Death", The South China Morning Post, 7 April 1927, p. 10.
- "BRENAN, BYRON, C.M.G.", The Foreign Office List and Diplomatic and Consular Year Book. London: Harrison and sons., 1928.
- "Sir John and Lady Brenan - Leaving Shanghai on Well-earned Leave", Hong Kong Daily Press, 31 March 1933, p. 7.
- "China Society Luncheon", The Asiatic Review Vol 36. Westminster Chamber, April 1940, pp. 578–587.
- Sun, Mary Man-yue, British Policy and the Chinese Revolutionary Movement, 1895-1912. Department of History, School of Oriental and African Studies, University of London, September 1968.
- Edited by Fairbank, John King, Bruner, Katherine Frost, and, Matheson, Elizabeth MacLeod, The I. G. in Peking: Letters of Robert Hart Chinese Maritime Customs 1868-1907 Vol One. Harvard University Press, 1975. ISBN 0-674-44320-9
- Brenan, Gerald, A Life of One's Own: Childhood and Youth. Cambridge : Cambridge University Press, 1979. ISBN 978-0-52129-734-9
- Chan Lau, Kit-ching, China, Britain and Hong Kong, 1895-1945. Hong Kong: Chinese University Press, 1990. ISBN 962-201-409-7
- Gao, James Z., Historical Dictionary of Modern China (1800-1949). Scarecrow Press, 2009.
- "Brenan, Byron", Who was Who. London: A. & C. Black, retrieved on 7 February 2019. (Electronic version. Subscription via the Wikipedia Library)
- "Brenan, (Edward Fitz-) Gerald", Who was Who. London: A. & C. Black, retrieved on 7 February 2019. (Electronic version. Subscription via the Wikipedia Library)
- "Brenan, Sir John (Fitzgerald)", Who was Who. London: A. & C. Black, retrieved on 7 February 2019. (Electronic version. Subscription via the Wikipedia Library)
- "Brenan, Terence Vincent", Who was Who. London: A. & C. Black, retrieved on 7 February 2019. (Electronic version. Subscription via the Wikipedia Library)
- "Ohio Death Index, 1908-1932, 1938-1944, and 1958-2007: Eric H Brenan", FamilySearch, retrieved on 7 February 2019.
- "St Luke groom marriages - B", Jerripedia Birth, Marriage and Burial Records, retrieved on 7 February 2019.
