= Student interpreter =

Historical diplomatic position

Student interpreter was, historically, an entry-level position in the British and American diplomatic and consular service, principally in China, Japan, Siam and, in the case of the United States, Turkey. It is no longer used as a title. A number of former student interpreters rose to senior diplomatic positions.

== Britain ==
The British Foreign Office appointed student interpreters after the opening of China and Japan in the mid-19th Century to learn the language of either country with the goal of developing a consular corps fluent in the local languages. Consular officers were expected to remain in their chosen country for the rest of their career.

Notable former British student interpreters include:

- Sir Sidney Barton (1876-1946), British Minister to Ethiopia
- Sir Frederick Samuel Augustus Bourne CMG (1854-1940), Assistant Judge of the British Supreme Court for China and Japan
- Penrhyn Grant Jones CBE (1878-1945), Assistant Judge of the British Supreme Court for China and Japan
- Sir Robert Hart, 1st Baronet (1835–1911), Inspector General of the Imperial Maritime Customs
- Sir John Jordan (1852-1925), British Minister to China
- Sir Ernest Mason Satow (1843-1929), British Minister to China and Japan
- Sir Hiram Shaw Wilkinson (1840-1926), Chief Justice of the British Supreme Court for China and Corea

== United States ==
The United States Department of State made provision for 10 student interpreters in Peking, 6 in Tokyo and 10 in Turkey. They were required to study the language of the country with view to becoming interpreters to American diplomats and consular officials. Only unmarried male United States citizens between the ages of 19 and 26 were eligible to apply. Those who passed the exam were required to serve at least 5 years and were eligible for appointment to diplomatic and consular roles.

Notable former America student interpreters include:

- Nelson T. Johnson (1887-1954), United States Ambassador to China.
- Norwood Allman (1893-1987), lawyer, mixed court assessor, newspaper editor, OSS and CIA operative
