= Eildon Hall (Scottish Borders) =

House in Scottish Borders, Scotland

Coordinates: 55°35′00″N 2°41′49″W

Eildon Hall, near St Boswells, Roxburghshire, is one of the houses belonging to the Dukes of Buccleuch and Queensbury. It is located at the foot of Eildon Hill, just south of the town of Melrose in the Scottish Borders. Princess Alice, Duchess of Gloucester (née Lady Alice Montagu Douglas Scott, daughter of the seventh Duke) is very descriptive of Eildon Hall, her childhood home, in her memoirs. She describes it as a "Georgian house with Victorian additions, made from the local coral pink sandstone," and "standing 600 feet above sea level." She also describes the view from the house as a "wonderful view of the valley below stretching away to the Cheviots thirty miles distant."

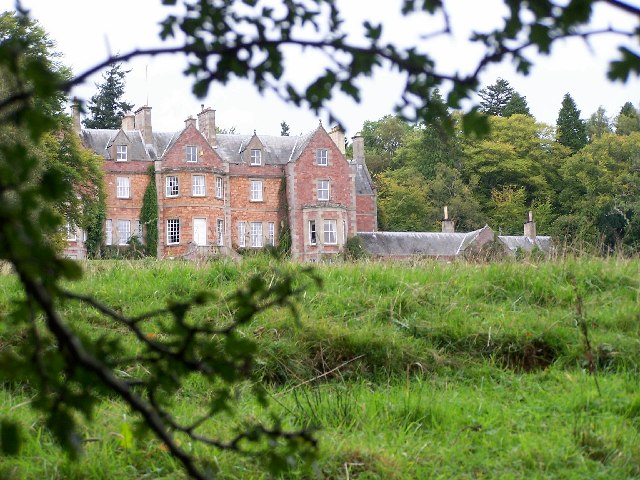
Eildon Hall. Eildon Hall and its surrounding woodland at the foot of the Eildon Hills are part of the Buccleuch Estates.

Eildon Hall is used as a principal residence by whosoever happens to be the Earl of Dalkeith, heir to the Dukedom of Buccleuch. "Perhaps because Eildon was the first grown-up home of aspiring Dukes of Buccleuch," wrote Princess Alice, "and has therefore always been a young family's house, it has a charmingly domestic air." It is less known than the other properties of the Montagu Douglas Scott family--Drumlanrig Castle, Bowhill House, and Boughton House, all three of which are where the bulk of the Duke of Buccleuch collections are housed. The family of the Earl of Dalkeith will generally use it until he inherits the title of Duke of Buccleuch, such as in the cases of the respective fathers of Princess Alice of Gloucester and Elizabeth, Duchess of Northumberland (née Lady Elizabeth Montagu Douglas Scott). Lady Elizabeth, who died as Dowager Duchess of Northumberland in 2012, was the daughter of Princess Alice's brother, Walter Montagu Douglas Scott, 8th Duke of Buccleuch and lived at Eildon Hall until 1935 when her grandfather, the seventh Duke, died.

When Princess Alice was growing up, Eildon Hall part of the succession of houses where the family lived throughout the year. After spending the "Season" at Montagu House in London, her parents, siblings, and she would travel up to Eildon House and stay there through the end of summer. Then they would move to Drumlanrig Castle in Dumfriesshire. Christmas was invariably spent at Dalkeith House near Edinburgh. In the new year, they would move to Bowhill, thence to Boughton at Easter, to London for the Season, back to Eildon Hall and so on.

== History ==
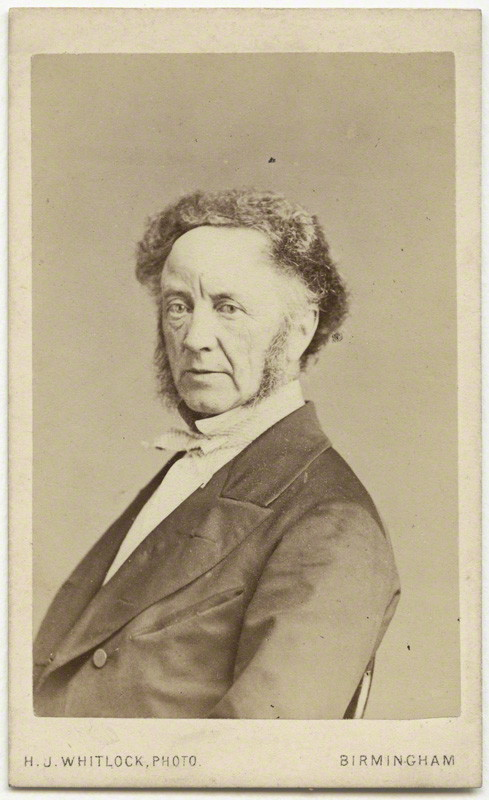
Walter Montagu Douglas Scott, 5th Duke of Buccleuch c 1860s

The house was built in 1802 for the Royal Navy surgeon Thomas Mein. Extensions were designed by the famous Scottish architect William Burn for the fifth Duke of Buccleuch, who bought the house in 1838 and wanted to use it as a base during the fox hunting season. The fifth Duke founded the Buccleuch Hunt in 1827; it chases the fox from the foothills of the Cheviot to the Lammermuir Hills. Princess Alice's memoirs, which she published in 1983, further the impression of Eildon Hall was a base for the fox hunting season. She mentions that her uncle Lord George Scott came often, as he was then Master of the Buccleuch Hunt; another paternal uncle, Lord Henry Scott, was equally enthusiastic about the hunt, who brought his friend, Cospatrick Douglas-Home, 11th Earl of Home. Princess Alice wrote: "Two days a week Uncle Henry and Cospatrick disappeared into Edinburgh to do something at a bank and thought themselves very hard worked; the rest of their time was spent hunting, shooting or fishing." Alice herself was keen on these activities, as testified to in the Illustrated London News, which wrote: "She was always very keen about hunting, and when at Eildon Hall missed very few meets."

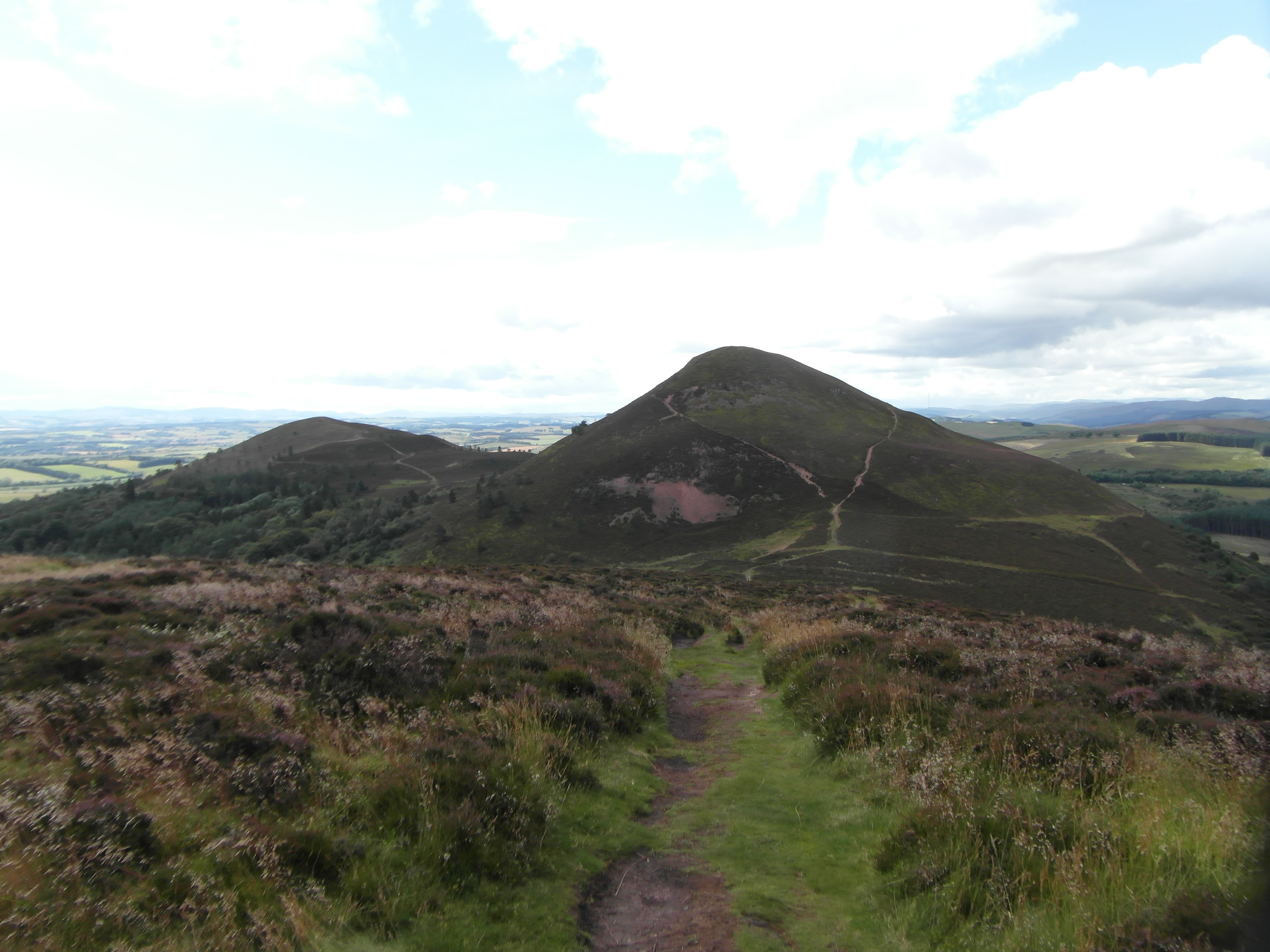
Eildon Hills, Melrose, Scotland

=== Folklore ===
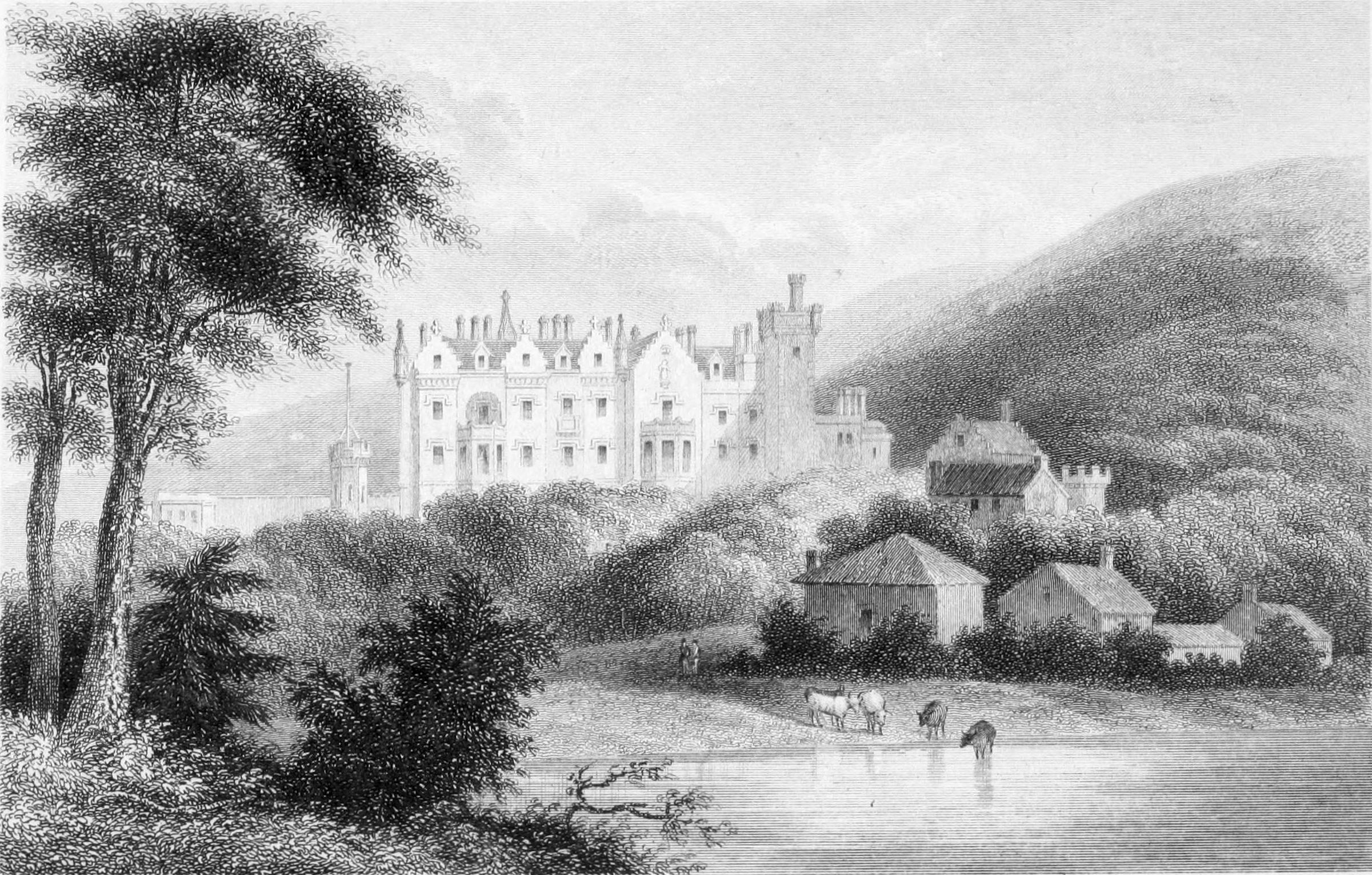
Pastoral engraving of a castle at Abbotsford.

Legend has it that King Arthur traversed the Eildon Hills. Battles and adventures, centering around characters of the Kingdom of Gododdin, and epic poems like the Y Gododdin reference these parts. The caverns of the Eildon hills are said to be represented as Avalon, where King Arthur took possession of the sword Excalibur. It is believed by some that King Arthur was buried in one of these caverns.

=== Literature ===
Sir Walter Scott lived nearby at Abbotsford House and his novel The Bride of Lammermoor is set in the Lammermuir Hills.

== The Clergy Cottage ==
Jane Scott, Duchess of Buccleuch, the former Jane McNeil (wife of the ninth Duke), is credited with the idea of installing the Clergy Cottage on the estate of Eildon Hall. Clergy from all over the United Kingdom could have holidays there. "It was enormously popular and benefited all, from curates to bishops."

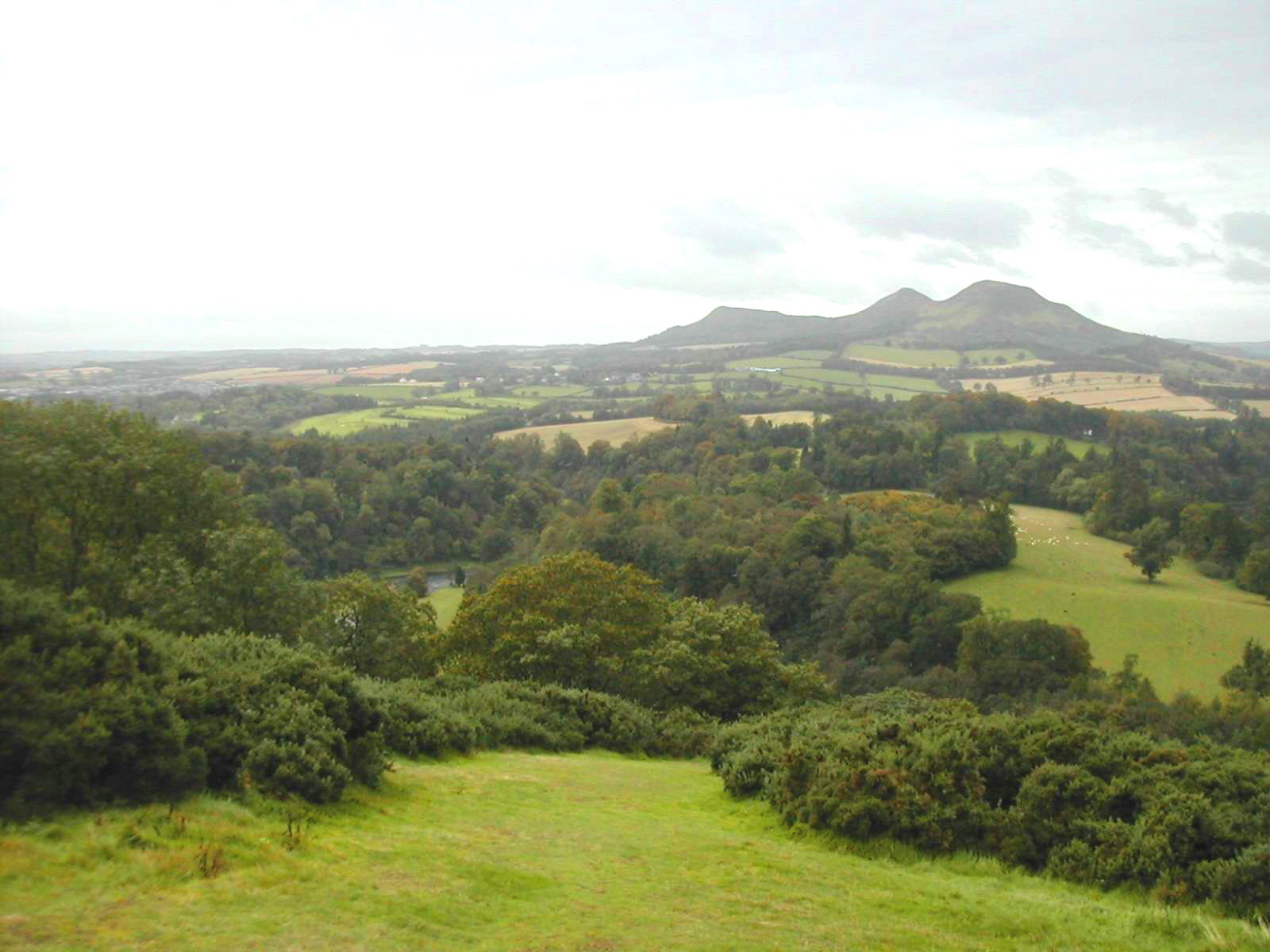
Eildon, Scotland

== The Gardens and Grounds ==
"We used to enjoy the gardens at Eildon," wrote Princess Alice. "Not only were there nice things to eat, lovely raspberries, peaches and figs, but the gardeners, with whom were great friends, encouraged us to do our own gardening by giving us plants. These we would cosset in our own little plots."

"No doubt we found solace in walking down to the railway bridge and watching the trains, another Eildon treat. There was also a trout pond at the foot of the field in front of the house, which is now used by local anglers."
