= Mary Montagu-Douglas-Scott, Duchess of Buccleuch =

Scottish noblewoman (1900–1993)

Her Grace The Duchess of Buccleuch and Queensberry
- Born: Vreda Esther Mary Lascelles; 17 September 1900
- Died: 9 February 1993 (aged 92); Boughton House, Weekley, Northamptonshire, England
- Buried: Melrose Abbey
- Spouse: Walter Montagu Douglas Scott, 8th Duke of Buccleuch (m. 1921)
- Issue: Elizabeth Percy, Duchess of Northumberland; John Montagu Douglas Scott, 9th Duke of Buccleuch; Caroline Gilmour, Baroness Gilmour of Craigmillar
- Father: Maj. William Frank Lascelles
- Mother: Lady Sybil Beauclerk

(Vreda Esther) Mary Montagu-Douglas-Scott, Duchess of Buccleuch and Queensberry (née Lascelles; 17 September 1900 – 9 February 1993), was an English aristocrat who was commonly known as Molly Buccleuch.

== Early life ==
Mary Montagu was the elder of the two daughters of Maj. William Frank Lascelles and Lady Sybil Evelyn de Vere Beauclerk. Her younger sister, Diana Lascelles, married the aide-de-camp to the Viceroy of India, Maj. Denis Bowes Daly (a son of Maj. Denis St. George Daly).

Her paternal grandparents were diplomat Frank Lascelles (a grandson of the 2nd Earl of Harewood) and Mary Emma Olliffe (a daughter of Sir Joseph Olliffe). Her maternal grandparents were William Beauclerk, 10th Duke of St Albans, and his first wife, Sybil Mary Grey. Through her mother, she was descended from Charles Beauclerk, 1st Duke of St Albans, an illegitimate son of King Charles II of England and his mistress Nell Gwynn.

== Personal life ==
On 21 April 1921, she married Walter Montagu Douglas Scott, 8th Duke of Buccleuch and 10th Duke of Queensberry, the son of John Montagu Douglas Scott, 7th Duke of Buccleuch and Lady Margaret Alice "Molly" Bridgeman (a daughter of the 4th Earl of Bradford). Walter's sister, Alice, married Prince Henry, Duke of Gloucester (one of the paternal uncles of Queen Elizabeth II). After he succeeded his father as the 8th Duke of Buccleuch on 19 October 1935, she was styled "Duchess of Buccleuch". They had three children:

- Lady Elizabeth Diana Montagu Douglas Scott (1922–2012), who married Hugh Percy, 10th Duke of Northumberland, on 12 June 1946. They had seven children and seventeen grandchildren.
- Walter Francis John Montagu Douglas Scott, 9th Duke of Buccleuch and 11th Duke of Queensberry (1923–2007), who married Jane McNeill, a daughter of John McNeill, QC, and Amy Maynard, on 10 January 1953. They hadfour children, ten grandchildren and two great-grandchildren.
- Caroline Montagu Douglas Scott (1927–2004), who married Ian Gilmour (later created a life peer as Baron Gilmour of Craigmillar), on 10 July 1951. They had five children, including historian David Gilmour, and seventeen grandchildren.

The Duchess died aged 92 at Boughton House on 9 February 1993. She was buried next to her husband among the ruins of Melrose Abbey.
