= Richard Scott, 10th Duke of Buccleuch =

Scottish nobleman (born 1954)

His Grace The Duke of Buccleuch and Queensberry KT GCVO KBE FSA FRSE FRSGS
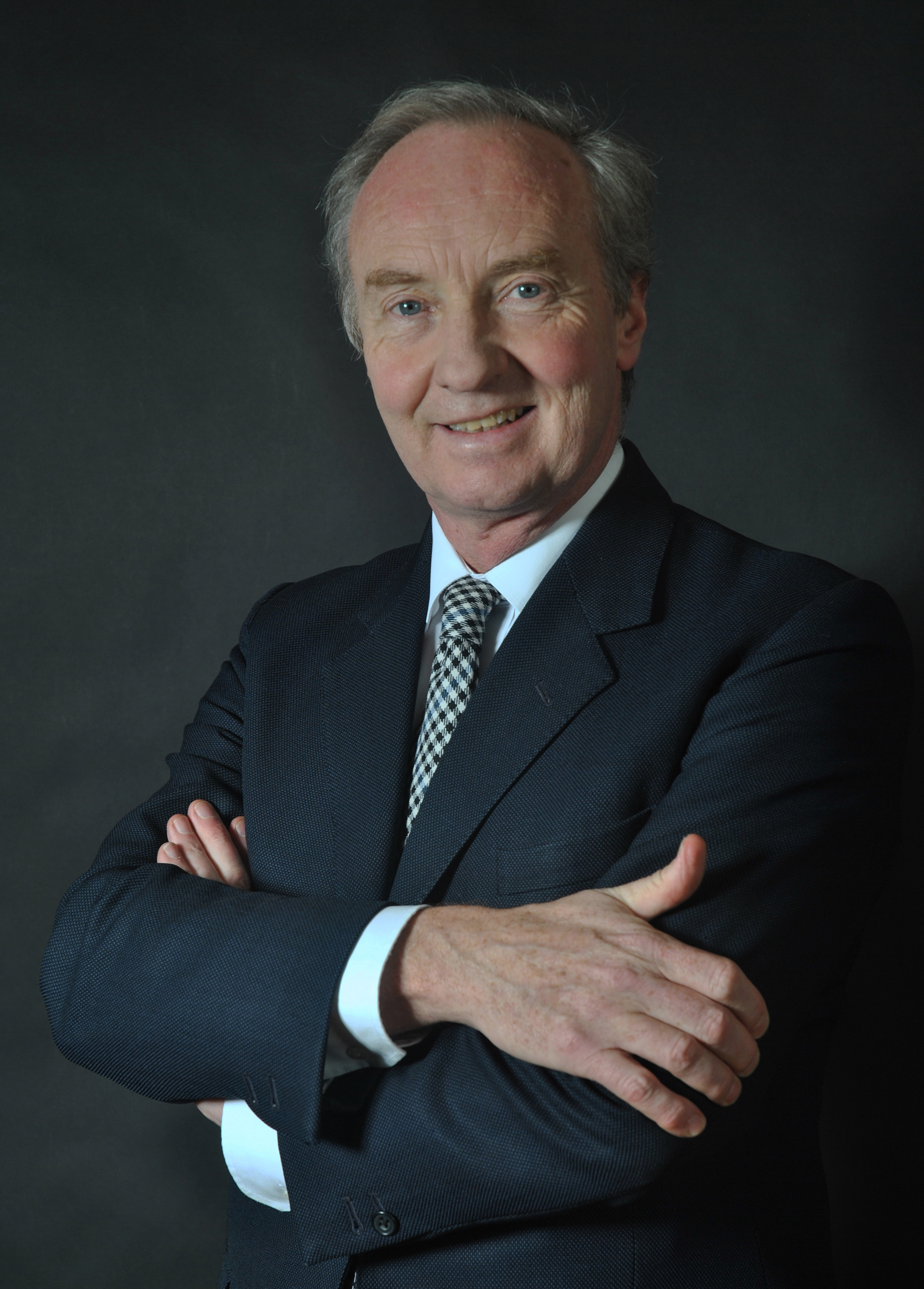
- Portrait by Allan Warren, 2013

Chancellor of the Order of the Thistle
- Incumbent
- Assumed office 9 December 2023
- Monarch: Charles III
- Preceded by: The Earl of Airlie

Lord Lieutenant of Roxburgh, Ettrick and Lauderdale
- In office 28 December 2016 – 4 July 2025
- Preceded by: Gerald Maitland-Carew
- Succeeded by: John Jeffrey

Personal details
- Born: Richard Walter John Montagu Douglas Scott; 14 February 1954 (age 72) Edinburgh, Scotland
- Spouse: Lady Elizabeth Kerr (m. 1981; died 2023)
- Children: 4
- Parents: John Scott, 9th Duke of Buccleuch; Jane McNeill
- Education: Christ Church, Oxford

Richard Walter John Montagu Douglas Scott, 10th Duke of Buccleuch and 12th Duke of Queensberry (born 14 February 1954), styled as Lord Eskdaill until 1973 and as Earl of Dalkeith from 1973 until 2007, is a Scottish landholder and peer. He is the Duke of Buccleuch and Queensberry, as well as Chief of Clan Scott.

Buccleuch was once Scotland's largest private landowner, owning 217,000 acres (88,000 hectares) of Scottish land, but was surpassed by Anders Holch Povlsen who currently holds 221,000 acres (89,000 hectares) in the country. The Duke was appointed as Chancellor of the Order of the Thistle by Charles III on 9 December 2023.

== Early life and education ==
Scott was born in 1954, the son of John Scott, 9th Duke of Buccleuch, and his wife, Jane Scott, Duchess of Buccleuch, a daughter of John McNeill. He was baptised with Princess Margaret as one of his godparents. His first cousin is Ralph Percy, 12th Duke of Northumberland. His first cousins once removed are Prince Richard, Duke of Gloucester and Prince William of Gloucester, members of the British royal family. He is the most senior descendant of James Scott, 1st Duke of Monmouth, the eldest illegitimate son of King Charles II, and more remotely in a direct male line from Alan of Dol, who arrived in Britain in 1066 with William the Conqueror.

He was educated at St. Mary's School, Melrose, and Eton College, and was Page of Honour to Queen Elizabeth the Queen Mother from 1967 to 1969. In 1973, his father inherited the Dukedoms of Buccleuch and Queensberry, and Scott took the courtesy title Earl of Dalkeith, having previously been styled Lord Eskdaill. He graduated from the University of Oxford in 1976 with a Bachelor of Arts degree.

== Career ==
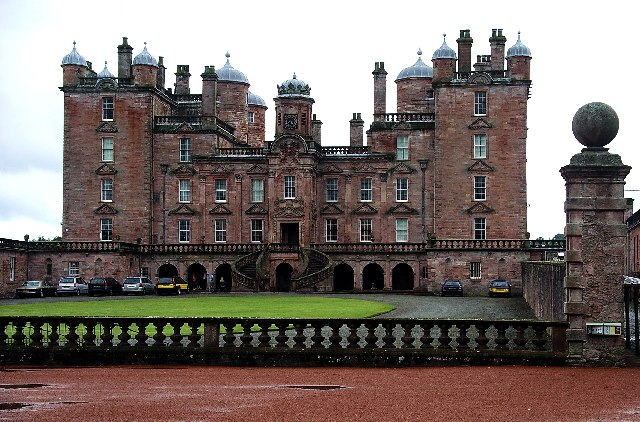
Drumlanrig Castle, Dumfries and Galloway – a seat of the Dukes of Buccleuch

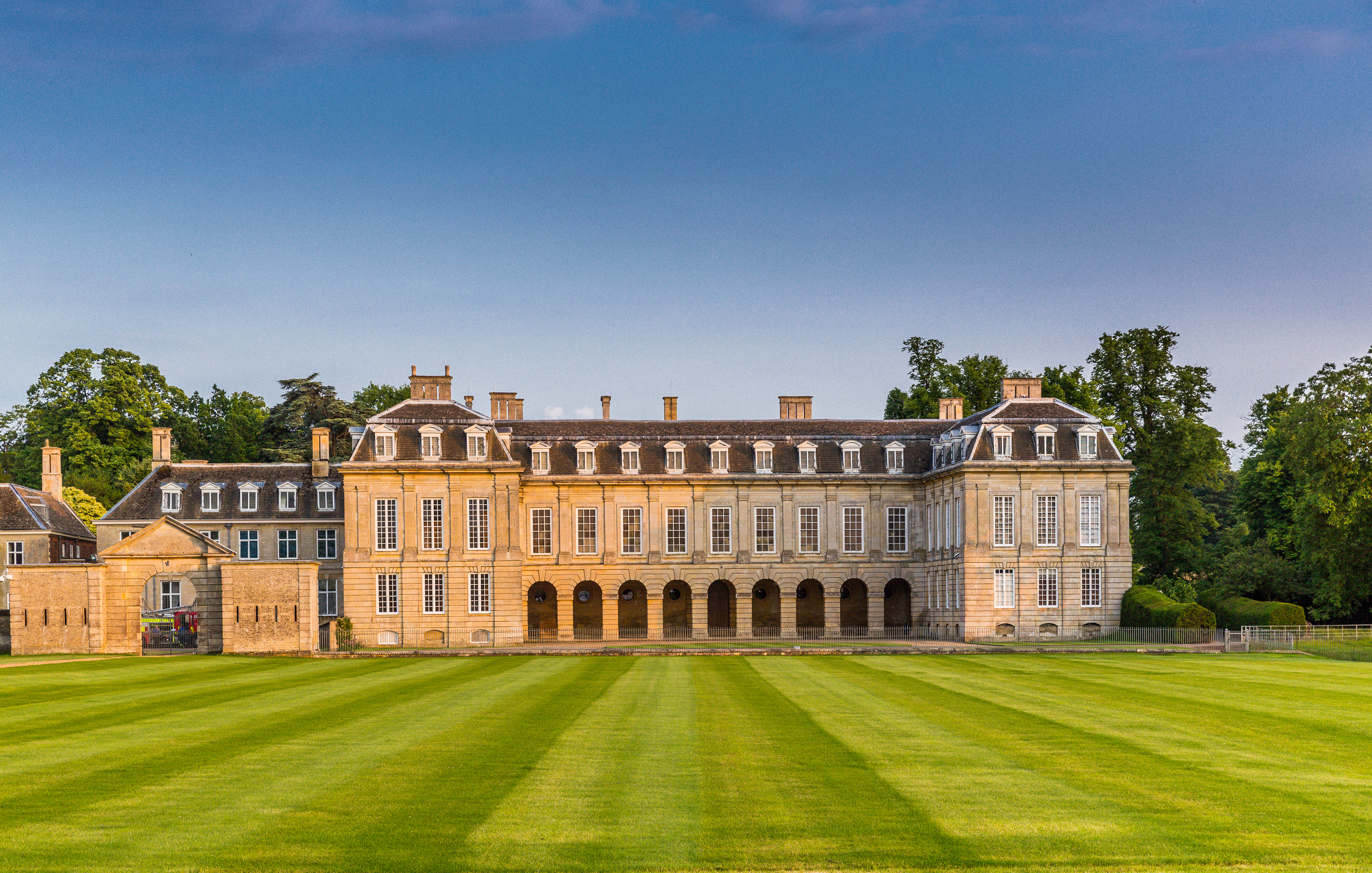
Boughton House, Northamptonshire – a seat of the Dukes of Buccleuch

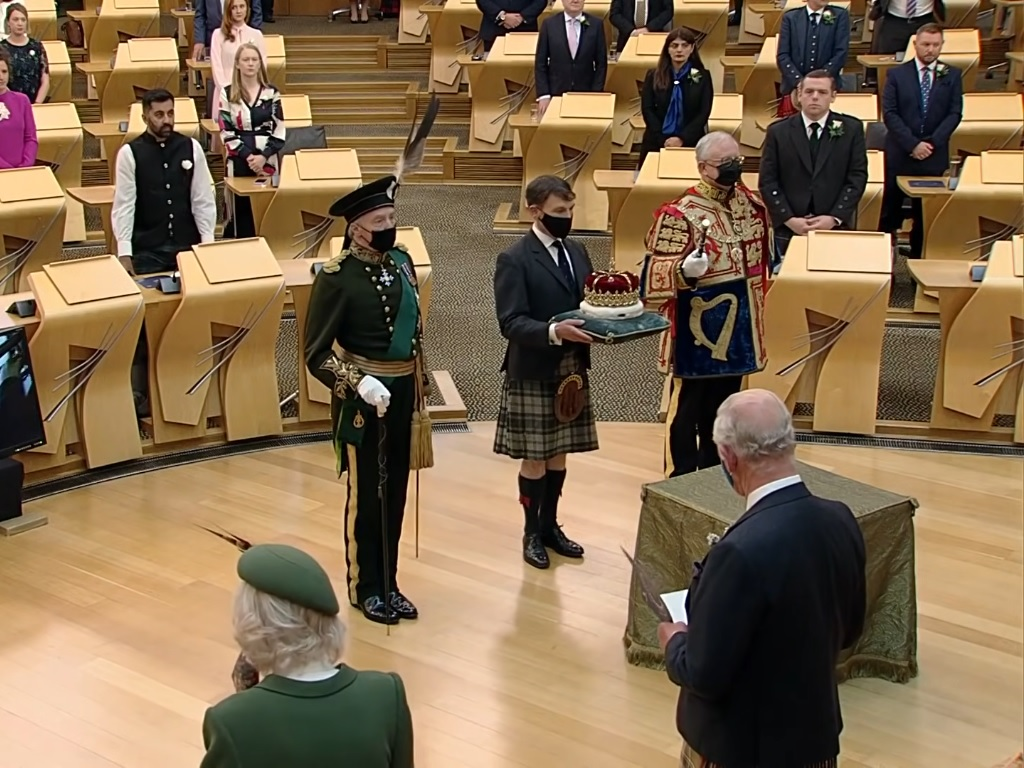
The Duke in the uniform of the Captain-General of the Royal Company of Archers in the Scottish Parliament, 2021

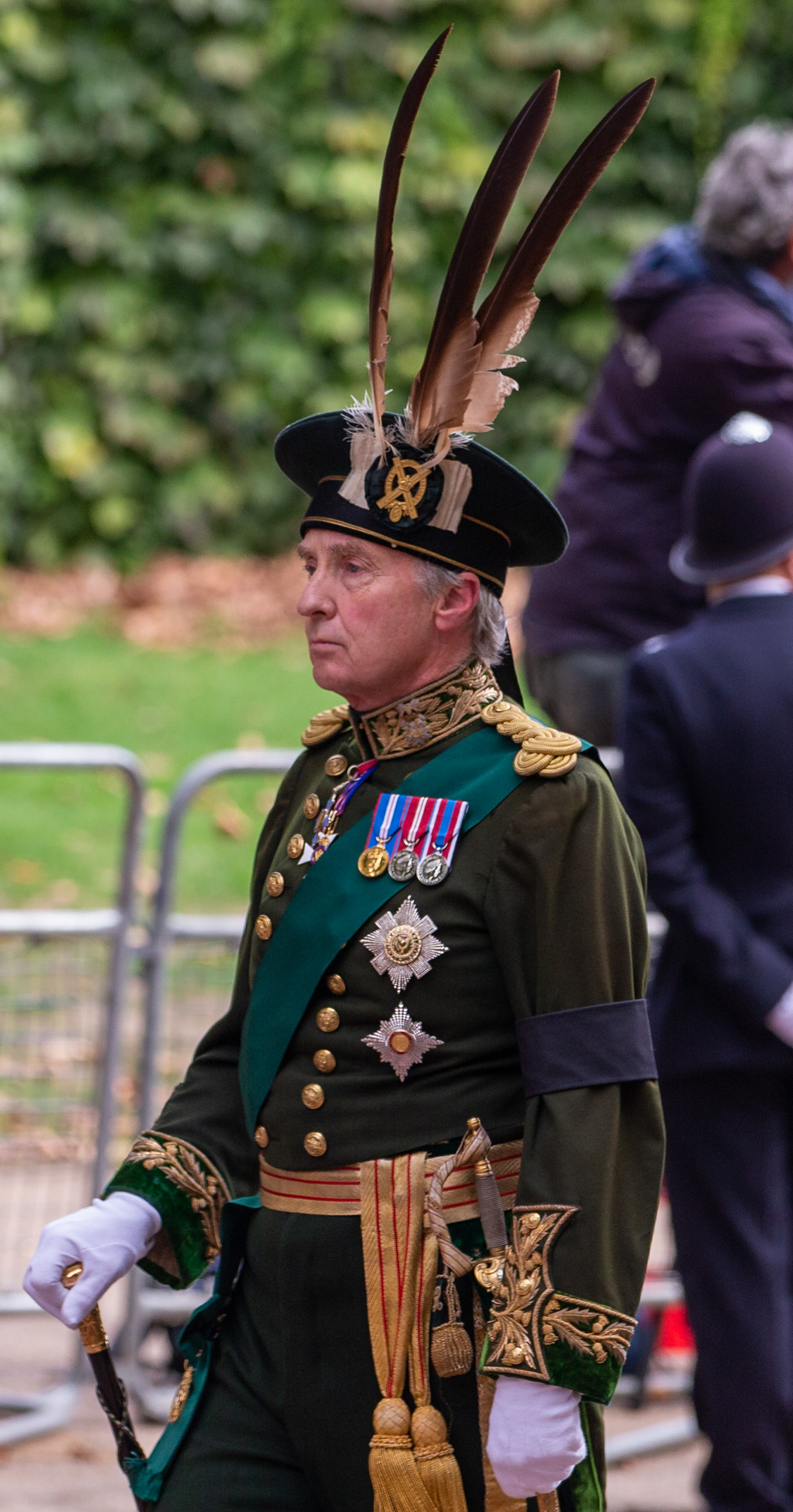
the Duke, as the Captain General of the Royal Company of Archers and Gold Stick for Scotland during Elizabeth II's funeral procession

As Earl of Dalkeith, he had a brief term on the board of Border Television from 1989 to 1990, and in 1994 he joined the Millennium Commission as the representative for Northern England. He was made a Knight Commander of the Order of the British Empire (KBE) in the 2000 New Year Honours for his services to the Millennium Celebrations, leaving the commission in 2003. He was president of the National Trust for Scotland from 2003 to 2012, and is a Fellow of the Royal Society of Edinburgh (FRSE).

He also served as Deputy Chairman of the (since abolished) Independent Television Commission, as a member of Scottish Heritage, on the board of the Winston Churchill Memorial Trust, and was President of the Royal Scottish Geographical Society from 1999 to 2005.

He inherited the titles of Duke of Buccleuch and Duke of Queensberry upon his father's death on 4 September 2007.

The art collection of the Dukes of Buccleuch is of great significance, and the recovery of the stolen Leonardo da Vinci painting Madonna of the Yarnwinder from the collection, valued at 30 million GBP, in a raid on the offices of a prestigious law firm captured public attention in 2007. In 2008 a painting in the family collection at Boughton House, a rare portrait of the young Queen Elizabeth I of England, was discovered.

On 1 January 2011, he was appointed Honorary Colonel of the 6th Battalion, The Royal Regiment of Scotland. His honorary colonelcy ended in 2016. In late 2011, he was appointed Deputy Lieutenant of Roxburgh, Ettrick & Lauderdale. In November 2016, he was appointed as Lord Lieutenant of Roxburgh, Ettrick and Lauderdale with effect from 28 December. He was appointed Captain-General of the Royal Company of Archers, The King's Bodyguard for Scotland in 2014.

The Duke is a trustee of the Royal Collection Trust, President of the Georgian Group and an honorary member of the Royal Institution of Chartered Surveyors (HonRICS). The Duke is President of St Andrew's First Aid. The Buccleuch family has held the presidency of St Andrew's First Aid since the early 1900s. In 2019 the Duke retired as chairman of the Buccleuch Group with interests in estate management, wind farms, tourism and hospitality, forestry and property

In October 2016, the Duke was appointed High Steward of Westminster Abbey, a position previously held by the 5th Duke in the late 19th century. In December 2017, he was appointed as Lord High Commissioner to the General Assembly of the Church of Scotland for the year 2018. In October 2018, he was re-appointed for the year 2019.

The Duke was appointed Knight of the Order of the Thistle (KT) in the 2018 New Year Honours with the appointment dated 30 November 2017; he was appointed Chancellor of the Order in succession to the Earl of Airlie in 2023. He was appointed Commander of the Royal Victorian Order (CVO) in the 2021 New Year Honours for services to the Royal Collections Trust, being promoted to Knight Grand Cross (GCVO) "for Public Service" in 2025. He took part in the royal procession at the coronation of Charles III and Camilla, carrying the Sceptre with Cross.

Houses owned by the Duke include Boughton House, Drumlanrig Castle, Dalkeith Palace, Eildon Hall and Bowhill House.

== Marriage and family ==
In 1981, he married Lady Elizabeth Kerr, a daughter of Peter Kerr, 12th Marquess of Lothian, and a sister of the 13th Marquess of Lothian, a Conservative politician.

They had four children:

- Lady Louisa Jane Therese Montagu Douglas Scott (born 1 October 1982); she married Rupert James Trotter on 28 May 2011. They have three children.
- Walter John Francis Montagu Douglas Scott, Earl of Dalkeith (born 2 August 1984); he married Elizabeth Honor Cobbe on 22 November 2014. They have four children.
- Lord Charles David Peter Montagu Douglas Scott (born 20 April 1987); he married Frances Flora Jane Summerfield in 2016. They have two sons.
- Lady Amabel Clare Alice Montagu Douglas Scott (born 23 June 1992).

The Duchess of Buccleuch and Queensberry has served as a patroness of the Royal Caledonian Ball.

The Duchess died after a short illness on 30 April 2023, aged 68.

== Arms ==
Coat of arms of Richard Scott, 10th Duke of Buccleuch
Coronet A coronet of a Duke Crest A Stag trippant proper armed and attired Or Escutcheon Quarterly: 1st grandquarter for the Earldom of Doncaster: the arms of King Charles II debruised by a Baton Sinister Argent; 2nd grandquarter for the Dukedom of Argyll: quarterly, 1st and 4th: Gyronny of eight Or and Sable (Campbell); 2 and 3rd: Argent a Lymphad sails furled Sable flags and pennons flying Gules and oars in action of the second (Lorne); 3rd grandquarter for the Dukedom of Queensberry: quarterly, 1st and 4th: Argent a Heart Gules crowned with an Imperial Crown Or on a Chief Azure three Mullets of the field (Douglas); 2 and 3rd, Azure a Bend between six Cross Crosslets fitchée Or (Mar); the whole of this grandquarter within a Bordure Or charged with a double Tressure flory-counter-flory Gules; 4th grandquarter for the Dukedom of Montagu: quarterly, 1st: Argent three Fusils conjoined in fess Gules a Bordure Sable (Montagu); 2nd: Or an Eagle displayed Vert beaked and membered Gules (Monthermer); 3rd: Sable a Lion rampant Argent on a Canton of the last a Cross Gules (Churchill); 4th: Argent a Chevron Gules between three Caps of Maintenance their fronts turned to the sinister Azure furred Ermine (Brudenell); over the grandquarters at the fess point an Inescutcheon Or on a Bend Azure a Mullet of six points between two Crescents of the field (Scott) Supporters On either side a Female Figure proper habited from the waist downwards in a Kirtle Azure gathered up at the knees the arms and bosom uncovered around the shoulders a Flowing Mantle as before suspended by the exterior hand girdle and sandals Gules and her head adorned with a Plume of three Ostrich Feathers Argent Motto Amo (I love) Orders Order of the Thistle

Court offices
Preceded by Valentine Cecil	Page of Honour to Queen Elizabeth The Queen Mother; 1967–1969	Succeeded by Simon Mulholland
Honorary titles
Preceded by Gerald Maitland-Carew	Lord Lieutenant of Roxburgh, Ettrick and Lauderdale; 2016–2025	Succeeded by John Jeffrey
Preceded by The Earl of Airlie	Chancellor of the Order of the Thistle; 2023–present	Incumbent
Peerage of Scotland
Preceded by John Scott	Duke of Buccleuch; Duke of Queensberry; 2007–present	Incumbent
Order of precedence in England and Wales
Preceded by The Duke of Hamilton	Gentlemen; The Duke of Buccleuch	Succeeded by The Duke of Argyll
Order of precedence in Scotland
Preceded by The Duke of Hamilton	Gentlemen; The Duke of Buccleuch	Succeeded by The Duke of Atholl
Order of precedence in Northern Ireland
Preceded by The Duke of Hamilton	Gentlemen; The Duke of Buccleuch	Succeeded by The Duke of Argyll
