= John Scott, 9th Duke of Buccleuch =

Scottish politician and peer

Lieutenant Commander His Grace The Duke of Buccleuch and Queensberry KT VRD JP DL
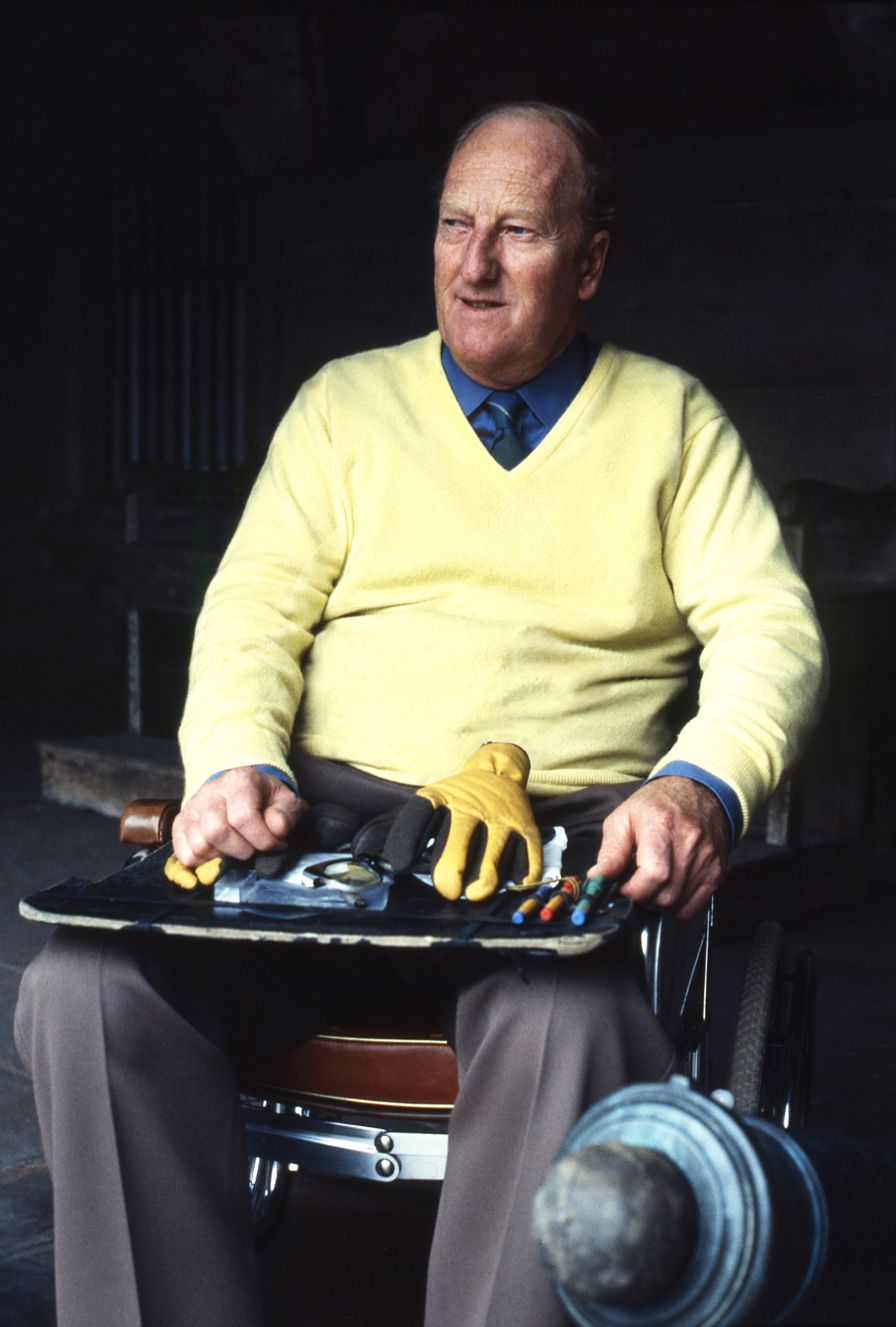
- Portrait by Allan Warren, 1986

Chancellor of the Order of the Thistle
- In office 6 October 1992 – 4 September 2007
- Monarch: Elizabeth II
- Preceded by: The Lord Home of the Hirsel
- Succeeded by: The Earl of Airlie

Lord Lieutenant of Roxburghshire
- In office 10 June 1974 – 16 May 1975
- Monarch: Elizabeth II
- Preceded by: The Duke of Buccleuch and Queensberry
- Succeeded by: Himself (as Lord Lieutenant of Roxburgh, Ettrick and Lauderdale)

Lord Lieutenant of Selkirkshire
- In office 16 March 1975 – 16 May 1975
- Monarch: Elizabeth II
- Preceded by: Sir Conolly Abel Smith
- Succeeded by: Himself (as Lord Lieutenant of Roxburgh, Ettrick and Lauderdale)

Lord Lieutenant of Roxburgh, Ettrick and Lauderdale
- In office 16 May 1975 – 7 December 1998
- Monarch: Elizabeth II
- Preceded by: Himself (as Lord Lieutenant of Roxburghshire and Lord Lieutenant of Selkirkshire)
- Succeeded by: June Paterson-Brown

Member of Parliament for Edinburgh North
- In office 19 May 1960 – 4 October 1973
- Preceded by: William Milligan
- Succeeded by: Alexander Fletcher

Personal details
- Born: Walter Francis John Montagu-Douglas-Scott, Lord Eskdaill; 28 September 1923 Westminster, London, England
- Died: 4 September 2007 (aged 83) Bowhill House, Scottish Borders, Scotland
- Party: Unionist
- Spouse: Jane McNeill (m. 1953)
- Children: 4, including Richard
- Parents: Walter Montagu Douglas Scott, 8th Duke of Buccleuch; Mary Lascelles
- Education: Eton College
- Alma mater: Christ Church, Oxford

Walter Francis John Montagu Douglas Scott, 9th Duke of Buccleuch and 11th Duke of Queensberry, KT VRD JP DL (28 September 1923 – 4 September 2007), known as Lord Eskdaill from birth to 1935 and then as the Earl of Dalkeith from 1935 to 1973, was a Scottish peer, politician and landowner. He served in the Royal Naval Volunteer Reserve in the Second World War, and represented Edinburgh North in the House of Commons for 13 years.

He owned the largest private landed estate in the United Kingdom, covering some 280,000 acres (1,100 km^{2}). The estate includes Drumlanrig Castle in Dumfries and Galloway, Bowhill House in Selkirkshire, and Boughton House in Northamptonshire. A fourth house, Dalkeith Palace, near Edinburgh, was most recently let to the West Central Wisconsin Consortium, which used the palace as a base for its study abroad program, until 2021.

== Early life ==
Walter Francis John Montagu-Douglas-Scott was best known by his middle name John, and he was the only son of Walter Montagu-Douglas-Scott, Earl of Dalkeith, and the former Mary Lascelles. He had two sisters: his sister Lady Elizabeth married the 10th Duke of Northumberland, and Lady Caroline wed politician Ian Gilmour.

He was a direct male-line descendant of Charles II of England from both his parents sides. His paternal aunt was Princess Alice, Duchess of Gloucester, and his first cousin is Prince Richard, Duke of Gloucester.

After his father acceded to the peerage, he became known as Johnny Dalkeith, from his courtesy title of Earl of Dalkeith. He was educated at Eton College.

== Career ==
In 1942, he joined the Royal Navy as an ordinary seaman, and was commissioned as an officer the following year, serving on destroyers. He continued as a lieutenant commander in the Royal Naval Volunteer Reserve and the Royal Naval Reserve after the war until 1971. He was awarded the Volunteer Reserve Decoration in 1959. He was appointed Honorary Captain in the Royal Naval Reserve in 1988. He was a Captain of the Royal Company of Archers, Lord President of the Council and Silver Stick for Scotland. He was a member of the Roxburghe Club.

=== Parliamentary career ===
After the war, he studied at Christ Church, Oxford, where he joined the Bullingdon Club. He briefly worked as a merchant banker in the City of London, and then as a director of an insurance company.

As Earl of Dalkeith, he was a Roxburghshire County Councillor from 1958. He contested Edinburgh East in the 1959 general election, losing to the incumbent Labour MP George Willis, but was elected as a Unionist (and latterly Conservative) Member of Parliament for Edinburgh North from a by-election in 1960. He served as Parliamentary Private Secretary to the Lord Advocate, William Rankine Milligan, from 1961 to 1962, then briefly as PPS to the Secretary of State for Scotland Jack Maclay from January 1962 to July that year. After Maclay was sacked in Harold Macmillan's Night of the Long Knives, he was PPS to Maclay's successor, Michael Noble, from 1962 to 1964. He defeated a young Robin Cook in the 1970 general election.

He and his wife sustained minor injuries in a car accident at Clumber Park, Nottinghamshire, on 16 August 1961, but made a full recovery. However, in a hunting accident near Hawick on 20 March 1971, his horse threw him off as it failed to take a drystone dyke, and then fell on him. Dalkeith was left paralysed from the chest down with a fractured spine. He left hospital in early September 1971, and spent the rest of his life in a wheelchair, and became a notable spokesman for disability organisations. He was the first MP after the Second World War to enter the House of Commons chamber in a wheelchair, where he was greeted by Harold Wilson, who crossed the floor of the chamber to shake his hand, in October 1971.

Dalkeith left the House of Commons in October 1973, as he succeeded to the Dukedom upon his father's death. As a result, he stood down as an MP. However, he remained a member of the House of Lords for the next 25 years, where he spoke particularly on rural, disability and constitutional issues, until the removal of the hereditary peers in the reforms of 1999.

== Personal life ==
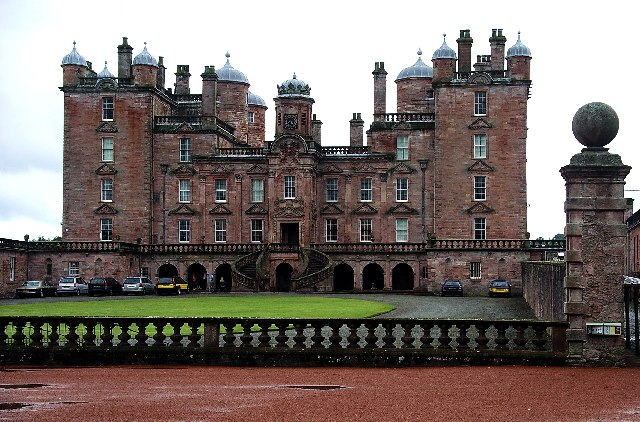
Drumlanrig Castle, Dumfries and Galloway – a seat of the Dukes of Buccleuch

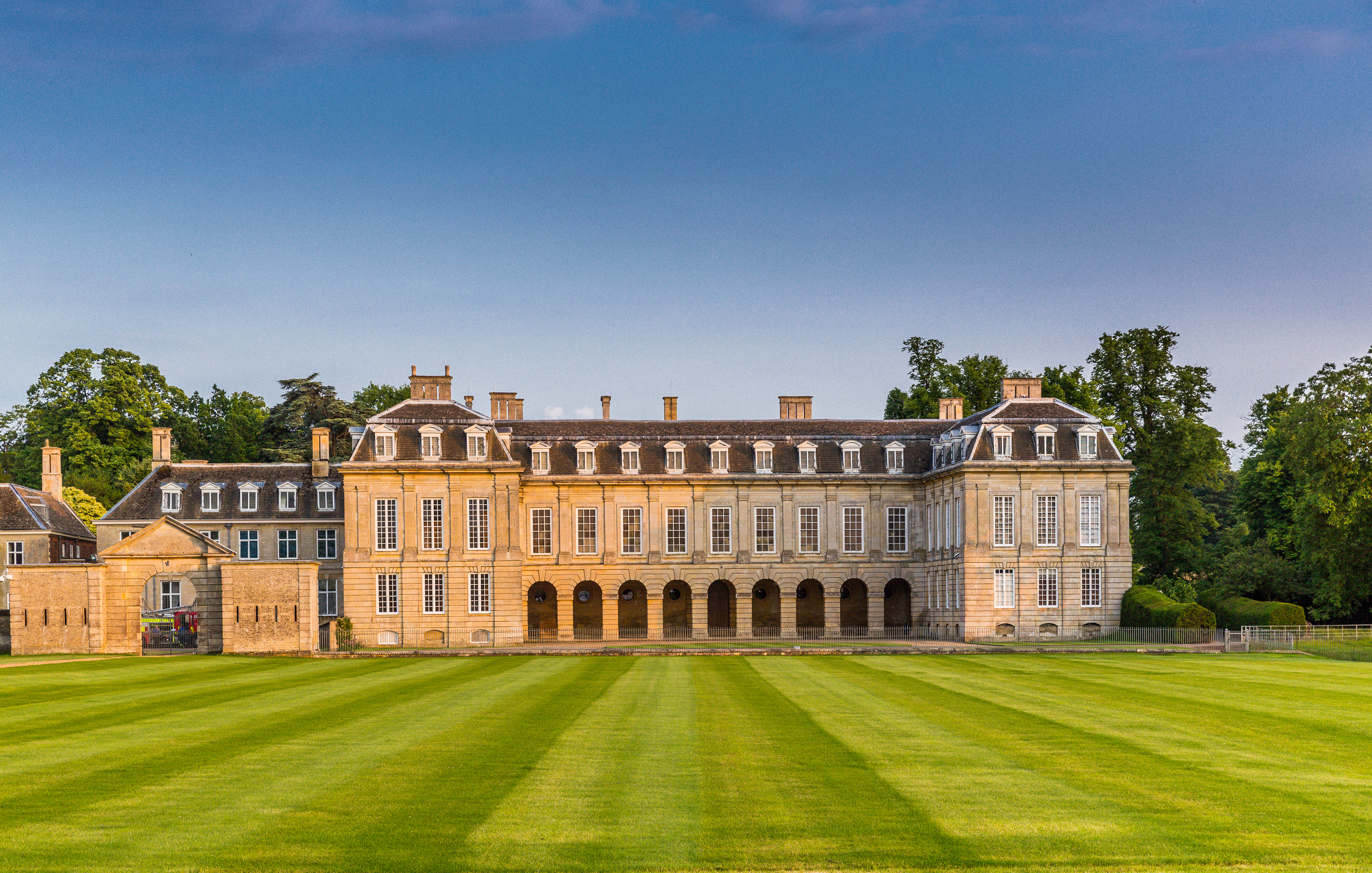
Boughton House, Northamptonshire – a seat of the Dukes of Buccleuch

The royal family reportedly wanted Princess Margaret to marry Dalkeith, but she was not interested. On 10 January 1953 he married Jane McNeill at a ceremony at St Giles Cathedral in Edinburgh attended by the Queen, the Duke of Edinburgh, and most of the royal family. Jane, a leading fashion model for Norman Hartnell, was the only child of John McNeill, QC, and the former Amy Yvonne Maynard. Together, they were the parents of four children:

- Richard Scott, 10th Duke of Buccleuch (born 14 February 1954), who married Lady Elizabeth Marion Frances Kerr, daughter of 12th Marquess of Lothian, in 1981, and has two sons and two daughters.
- Lady Charlotte-Anne Montagu Douglas Scott (born 9 January 1966), who married Comte Bernard de Castellane in 1991, and has two sons and a daughter.
- Lord John Montagu Douglas Scott (born 9 August 1957), who married Berrin Torolsan in 1990.
- Lord Damian Torquil Francis Charles Montagu Douglas Scott (born 8 October 1970), who married Elisabeth Powis in 2001, and has two sons and a daughter.

The Duke was in the headlines in October 2003 when the Madonna with the Yarnwinder by Leonardo da Vinci was stolen from Drumlanrig Castle. It was found in October 2007, one month after the Duke's death.

The Duke died after a short illness at one of his three homes, Bowhill House, in Selkirkshire, Scottish Borders, in the early hours of 4 September 2007. He was survived by his wife, daughter, and three sons (ten grandchildren and two great-grandchildren). The Duke was buried on 11 September 2007 among the ruins of Melrose Abbey, next to his parents. His cousin the Duke of Gloucester was among the 2,500 guests who attended the burial ceremony.

== Chairmanships ==
- RADAR (1977–1993); President (1993–2007)
- Buccleuch Heritage Trust (1985–2007)
- Living Landscape Trust (1985–2007)
- Association of Lord-Lieutenants (1990–2007)
- President of The Royal Highland and Agricultural Society of Scotland (1969)
- St Andrew's Ambulance Association (1972–2007)
- Royal Scottish Agricultural Benevolent Institute (1973–2007)
- Scottish National Institution for the War Blinded (1973–2007)
- Royal Blind Asylum and School (1976)
- Galloway Cattle Society of Great Britain and Ireland (1976)
- East of England Agricultural Society (1976)
- Commonwealth Forestry Association (1979–1999)
- Vice President of The Royal Scottish Society for Prevention of Cruelty to Children
- President of The Edinburgh Sir Walter Scott Club (1982)
- Royal Scottish Forestry Society (1994–1996)
- Honorary President Animal Diseases Research Association (1973–1995)
- Honorary President of the South of Scotland Car Club Ltd (1951–2007)

== Honours ==
- Knight of the Order of the Thistle (1978); Chancellor (1992–2007)
- Royal Naval Volunteer Reserve Decoration (1959)
- Justice of the Peace for the commission area of Roxburgh (1975)
- Deputy Lieutenant of Selkirkshire (1955)
- Deputy Lieutenant of Roxburghshire (1962)
- Deputy Lieutenant of Dumfriesshire (1974)
- Lord-Lieutenant of Roxburghshire (1974–1975)
- Lord-Lieutenant of Selkirk (1975)
- Lord Lieutenant of Roxburgh, Ettrick and Lauderdale (1975–1998)
- Bledisloe Gold Medal (1992)
- Chief of Clan Scott (1973–2007)

=== Honorary military appointments ===
- Captain, Royal Naval Reserve (1988–2007)

== Arms ==
Coat of arms of John Scott, 9th Duke of Buccleuch
Coronet A coronet of a Duke Crest A Stag trippant proper armed and attired Or Escutcheon Quarterly: 1st grandquarter for the Earldom of Doncaster: the arms of King Charles II debruised by a Baton Sinister Argent; 2nd grandquarter for the Dukedom of Argyll: quarterly, 1st and 4th: Gyronny of eight Or and Sable (Campbell); 2 and 3rd: Argent a Lymphad sails furled Sable flags and pennons flying Gules and oars in action of the second (Lorne); 3rd grandquarter for the Dukedom of Queensberry: quarterly, 1st and 4th: Argent a Heart Gules crowned with an Imperial Crown Or on a Chief Azure three Mullets of the field (Douglas); 2 and 3rd, Azure a Bend between six Cross Crosslets fitchée Or (Mar); the whole of this grandquarter within a Bordure Or charged with a double Tressure flory-counter-flory Gules; 4th grandquarter for the Dukedom of Montagu: quarterly, 1st: Argent three Fusils conjoined in fess Gules a Bordure Sable (Montagu); 2nd: Or an Eagle displayed Vert beaked and membered Gules (Monthermer); 3rd: Sable a Lion rampant Argent on a Canton of the last a Cross Gules (Churchill); 4th: Argent a Chevron Gules between three Caps of Maintenance their fronts turned to the sinister Azure furred Ermine (Brudenell); over the grandquarters at the fess point an Inescutcheon Or on a Bend Azure a Mullet of six points between two Crescents of the field (Scott) Supporters On either side a Female Figure proper habited from the waist downwards in a Kirtle Azure gathered up at the knees the arms and bosom uncovered around the shoulders a Flowing Mantle as before suspended by the exterior hand girdle and sandals Gules and her head adorned with a Plume of three Ostrich Feathers Argent Motto Amo (I love) Orders Order of the Thistle

Parliament of the United Kingdom
Preceded by William Milligan	Member of Parliament for Edinburgh North; 1960–1973	Succeeded by Alexander Fletcher
Honorary titles
Preceded by The Lord Home of the Hirsel	Chancellor of the Order of the Thistle; 1992–2007	Succeeded by The Earl of Airlie
Preceded by The Duke of Buccleuch	Lord Lieutenant of Roxburghshire; 1974–1975	Office abolished
Preceded by Sir Conolly Abel Smith	Lord Lieutenant of Selkirkshire; 1975	Office abolished
New office	Lord Lieutenant of Roxburgh, Ettrick and Lauderdale; 1975–1998	Succeeded by June Paterson-Brown
Peerage of Scotland
Preceded by Walter Scott	Duke of Buccleuch; Duke of Queensberry; 1973–2007	Succeeded by Richard Scott
