= James Maitland, 7th Earl of Lauderdale (Reynolds painting) =

Painting by Sir Joshua Renyolds

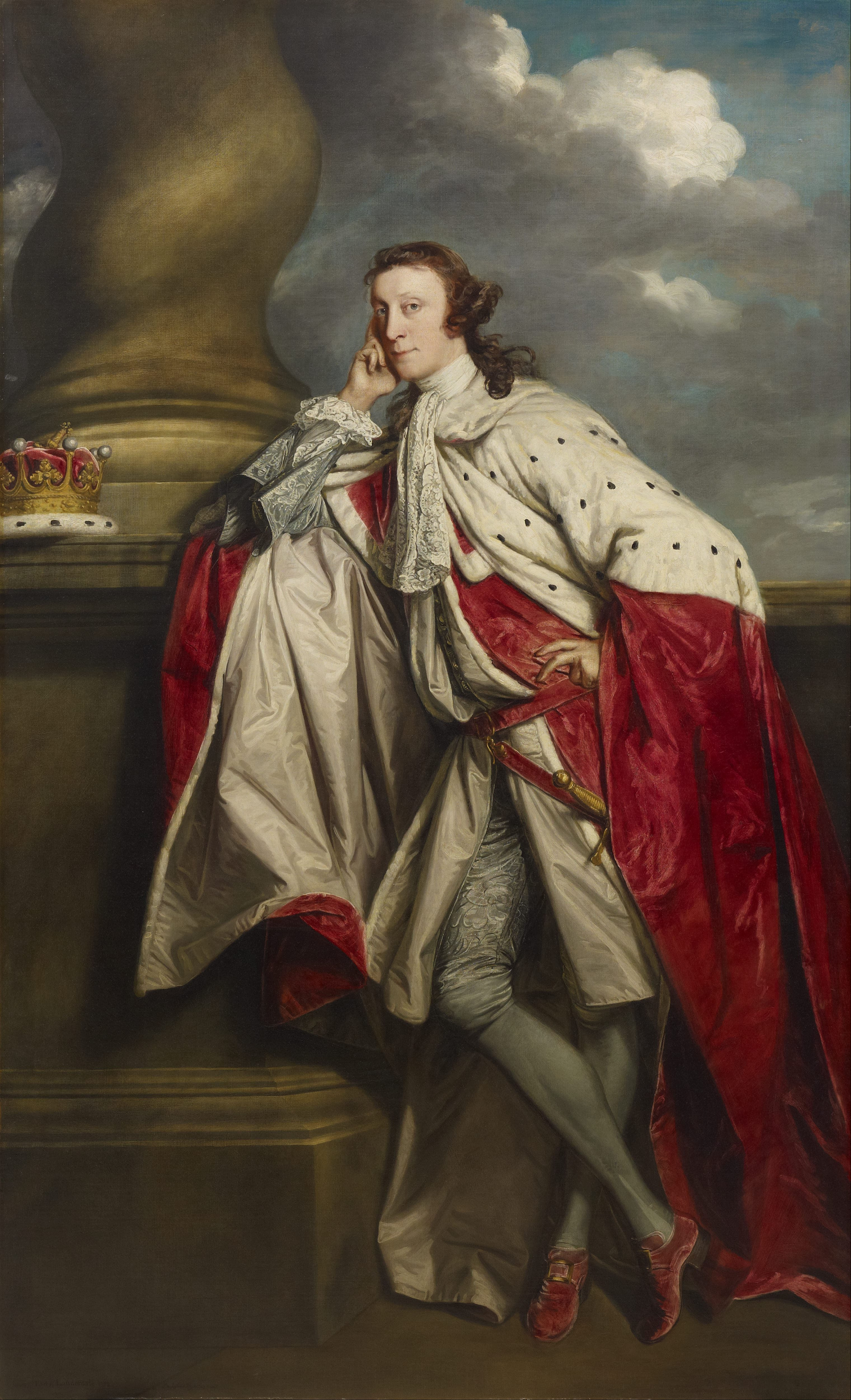
- Artist: Sir Joshua Reynolds
- Year: 1759–1760
- Medium: Oil on canvas
- Movement: English Grand style
- Subject: James Maitland, 7th Earl of Lauderdale
- Dimensions: 239 cm × 148.5 cm (94 in × 58.5 in)
- Location: Art Gallery of New South Wales; Sydney, Australia
- Accession: 8.1977

James Maitland, 7th Earl of Lauderdale is a painting by Sir Joshua Reynolds of James Maitland, the 7th Earl of Lauderdale. It was painted during 1759–1760, and is presently in the collection of the Art Gallery of New South Wales.

== Painting ==
James Maitland was 41 years old when he sat for this portrait after a distinguished career in the army. At this time, Reynolds was well known as one of the greatest portrait painters of the British aristocracy. The three rows of ermine on his robe indicate that he is an Earl, as do the eight silver balls on raised points alternating with strawberry leaves on his coronet. Being lent on by Lord Lauderdale, is a Solomonic column, suggestive of a trip to Italy, when in fact, the Scottish peer had never been there.

== History ==
The Earl sat for the portrait during 1759, and purchased it from Reynolds in 1761 for £80. The painting passed through the family until 1976, when the Hon Gerald Edward Ian Maitland-Carew sold the painting at Christie's on 26 March. The painting was purchased by the Art Gallery of New South Wales, a public collection, after the gallery had received an anonymous gift fund to purchase an 18th-century portrait earlier that year.
