= Victor Priestwood =

Crown Advocate of the British Supreme Court for China (1934-1939)

British Crown Advocate for China
- In office 1934–1939
- Preceded by: Allan Mossop
- Succeeded by: John McNeill

Personal details
- Born: May 1902 Lancashire, England
- Died: 1954 Surrey, England

Victor Priestwood (1902-1954) served as Crown Advocate of the British Supreme Court for China from 1934 to 1939.

== Early life ==
Priestwood was born in May 1902 in Lancashire, England. He studied at Keble College, Oxford and was called to the bar of the Inner Temple on 29 January 1920. He passed his bar exams in April 1922. He was the second son of John George Priestwood, a solicitor who practiced in Shanghai.

== Legal career ==
In 1924, Priestwood moved to Shanghai. He was admitted before the British Supreme Court for China and joined his father in practice. Later he worked with Hiram Parkes Wilkinson and Allan Mossop the Crown Advocates of the court. In 1930, he acted as Crown Advocate of the court in the absence of Allan Mossop. Mossop was appointed as judge of the court in 1933 and in 1934 and Priestwood was appointed Crown Advocate.

== Termination of appointment ==
In late 1939, Priestwood's appointment as Crown Advocate was terminated. In late 1940, left Shanghai for England arriving in early 1941. He joined the Royal Air Force on 28 February 1941 as a probationary pilot officer in the Administrative and Special Duties Branch and served in the RAF during World War II.

== Death ==
Priestwood died in 1954 in Surrey, England.
