= John Jeffrey =

British Lions & Scotland international rugby union player

Lord Lieutenant of Roxburgh, Ettrick and Lauderdale
- Incumbent
- Assumed office 30 June 2025
- Preceded by: Richard Scott, 10th Duke of Buccleuch

Personal details
- Born: 25 March 1959 (age 67) Kelso, Scottish Borders

Rugby union career
- Position: Flanker
Amateur team(s)
Years	Team	Apps	(Points)
- Kelso
Provincial / State sides
Years	Team	Apps	(Points)
- South of Scotland
International career
Years	Team	Apps	(Points)
1983-84	Scotland 'B'	3	
1984–91	Scotland	40	(44)

John Jeffrey (born 25 March 1959) is a Scottish former rugby union player, coach and administrator. He won 40 caps for Scotland, and was part of the team that won the Grand Slam in 1990. After retiring as a player he was a coach and administrator. Since June 2025, he has served as Lord Lieutenant of Roxburgh, Ettrick and Lauderdale.

== Early life ==
Jeffrey was educated at St. Mary's School, Melrose and Merchiston Castle School. Jeffrey owns a farm in the Borders. His nicknames were "The Great White Shark" and "JJ".

== Playing career ==
Jeffrey played for Kelso and South of Scotland.

He was capped by Scotland 'B' 3 times between 1983 and 1984.

He won forty caps for Scotland between 1984 and 1991, making him, at the time, Scotland's most capped flanker. He scored 11 tries, another Scottish record at the time, shared with back-row colleague Derek White.

Journalist Richard Bath described him as "one of the most galvanising sights in Five Nations rugby throughout the 1980s and early 1990s."

In 1988, after playing football with the Calcutta Cup along Princes Street in Edinburgh with England's Dean Richards, Jeffrey received a six-month ban from the Scottish Rugby Union. Richards received a one match sentence from the English Rugby Football Union. The trophy was severely dented, and cost hundreds of pounds to repair. Jeffrey later admitted to having been drunk at the time of the incident: "There was no doubt it was us. It was a mix of alcohol and high jinks. I think I had sobered up a bit by the time I got back to the hotel. I remember looking at the cup and thinking, 'hmmm, we could be in a spot of bother here'."

Jeffrey was selected for the British Lions' 1989 Tour of Australia.

He was a part of the Scotland team that won the Grand Slam in 1990.

During the 1990 Hong Kong Sevens, Jeffrey played for Scotland 7s, but when they were knocked out, he went on to play for Wales 7s as they were suffering from too many injuries.

== Later career ==
Jeffrey was involved in coaching the Scotland youth teams. He has commentated on rugby games for the BBC.

He was a member of the (now World Rugby) Council (previously the International Rugby Board) and head of referees since 2010.

In December 2020 Jeffrey was appointed as chairman of the Scottish Rugby Board. In December 2022 Scottish Rugby announced that Jeffrey would stand down as chairman in May 2023 but would remain on the board.

In 2024 Jeffrey put himself forward as a candidate for the charirmanship of World Rugby. His candidacy was not supported by the Scottish Rugby Union, and he subsequently resigned as president of the Six Nations and as a board member, council member and vice-chairman of World Rugby.

On 30 June 2025, it was announced that he had been appointed Lord Lieutenant of Roxburgh, Ettrick and Lauderdale, the monarch's representative in the area.

Honorary titles
Preceded by The Duke of Buccleuch	Lord Lieutenant of Roxburgh, Ettrick and Lauderdale; 2025–present	Incumbent
