= Lord Lieutenant of Roxburgh, Ettrick and Lauderdale =

Ceremonial officer in Scotland

This is a list of people who have served as Lord Lieutenant of Roxburgh, Ettrick and Lauderdale. This office replaced the Lord Lieutenant of Roxburghshire and the Lord Lieutenant of Selkirkshire in 1975.

- Buccleuch had been Lord Lieutenant of Roxburghshire and Selkirkshire
- John Scott, 9th Duke of Buccleuch, 1975–1998
- June Paterson-Brown, 7 December 1998 – 2007
- Gerald Maitland-Carew, 28 March 2007 – 28 December 2016
- Richard Scott, 10th Duke of Buccleuch, 28 December 2016 – 4 July 2025
- John Jeffrey, 30 June 2025 – present
