= June Paterson-Brown =

British medical doctor, first female Lord Lieutenant in Scotland, Girl Guide executive

June Paterson-Brown CVO CBE
- Born: June Garden; 8 February 1932; Edinburgh, Scotland
- Died: 6 December 2009 (aged 77); Hawick, Scotland
- Education: University of Edinburgh Medical School
- Occupation: Doctor
- Website: insert

June Paterson-Brown, née Garden CVO CBE (8 February 1932 – 6 December 2009) was a Scottish medical doctor, early family planning advocate, Chief Commissioner of the Girl Guides Association, and the first female Lord Lieutenant in Scotland.

== Early life and education ==
June Garden was born on 8 February 1932 in Edinburgh, Scotland. She was the daughter of Jean Mallace and Thomas Garden. Wing Commander CA. She graduated from the University of Edinburgh Medical School in 1955.

== Career ==
=== Medical doctor ===
After graduation, she became employed at the Royal Infirmary of Edinburgh, where she worked as a junior houseman. In 1956, she transferred to East Fortune Hospital where patients were treated for tuberculosis. In 1957, she married Peter Neville Paterson-Brown, a general practitioner, and moved to Hawick in the Scottish Borders.

Paterson-Brown became increasingly involved in family planning advocacy beginning in 1960 when she started to give talks at family planning clinics. Because family planning was a sensitive topic at the time, she gave talks "in virtual darkness with one light illuminating the blackboard," which helped to provide attendees a degree of anonymity. She continued providing support and guidance related to family planning for years, and was publicly praised for her work assisting "generations of expectant mothers."

=== Lord Lieutenant ===
In 1998, she was appointed to succeed the Duke of Buccleuch as the first female Lord Lieutenant in Scotland, serving as the Queen's representative for Roxburgh, Ettick and Lauderdale. Her appointment was reportedly made on the personal recommendation from the Duke. Paterson-Brown held the position from 1998 to 2007.

== Awards and honours ==
- Tweeddale Press Group's “Man of the Year”, 1980
- Commander of the Order of the British Empire (CBE), 1991
- Commander of the Victorian Order (CVO), 2007
- Silver Fish Award 1989

== Personal life ==
Following a long-time interest in the Girl Guides, Paterson-Brown held a number of leadership positions in the Girl Guides Association, now known as the Girlguiding Scotland. In 1963, she was appointed District Commissioner for Hawick North, and in 1969, she was appointed County Commissioner for Roxburghshire. She went on to hold the title of Scottish Chief Commissioner from 1977 to 1982, and Chief Commissioner of the Girl Guides Association from 1985 to 1990.

Dinah Faulds, Scottish Chief Commissioner from 1977 to 1982 said, "I found that wherever I travelled in Scotland on Guide business members would ask after June. She was gracious, keenly interested in taking the movement forward and equally at ease with the shyest Brownie or boldest leader.” In 1989, she was awarded for her exceptional 30 years of service to the Girl Guides with the Silver Fish, the organisation's highest honour.

Paterson-Brown died in Hawick on 6 December 2009.

Honorary titles
Preceded by The Duke of Buccleuch	Lord Lieutenant of Roxburgh, Ettrick and Lauderdale; 1998–2007	Succeeded by Gerald Maitland-Carew
