= St Mary's School, Melrose =

St Mary's School

Location
- Abbey Park; Melrose, TD6 9LN; Scotland; 55.598°N 2.731°W

Information
- Type: Preparatory school Day & Boarding School
- Motto: Behalde to ye hende (Look to your future)
- Established: 1895
- Founder: John Hamilton
- Headmaster: Liam Harvey
- Age: 2 to 13
- Website: http://www.stmarysmelrose.org.uk

St Mary's School is a private, co-educational, day and boarding prep school in Melrose, Scotland. As of 2015 there are 190 pupils; 97 boys and 93 girls.

== History ==
St Mary's School was established in 1895 by John Hamilton as a school for boys. The school remains at its original location in Abbey Park, Melrose, and is named after St Mary's Abbey, Melrose. In 1976 the school became co-educational.

The school motto is Behalde to ye hende, which means Look to your future in old Scots.

In July 2010 the school opened the Hamilton Building, named after the founder, for the use of the top three years' pupils.

The headmaster, Liam Harvey, took charge in September 2010 and is a former pupil of the school.

In March 2015 the Sanderson Building, a new science and art block, was opened by Princess Anne.

St Mary's School has produced seventeen Scotland rugby union internationals, six of whom have represented the British and Irish Lions.

== Notable alumni ==
- Roger Baird (born 1960), Scotland and Lions rugby union international.
- Richard Scott, 10th Duke of Buccleuch (born 1954), landowner and Chief of Clan Scott.
- John Cameron, Lord Abernethy (born 1937), High Court Judge.
- Arthur Dorward (1925–2015), Scotland rugby union international.
- Tom Elliot (1926–1998), Scotland and Lions rugby union international.
- Sir Russell Fairgrieve (1924–1999), Conservative and Unionist politician.
- John Jeffrey (born 1959), Scotland and Lions rugby union international.
- Gordon Waddell (1937–2012), Scotland and Lions rugby union international.
