= 1960 Edinburgh North by-election =

UK parliamentary by-election

The 1960 Edinburgh North by-election was held on 19 May 1960. It was held due to the appointment of the incumbent Conservative MP, William Rankine Milligan to the Court of Session. The by-election was won by the Conservative candidate, John Douglas-Scott who would later become Duke of Buccleuch.

By-election 1960: Edinburgh North
Party	Candidate	Votes	%	±%
Conservative	John Douglas-Scott	12,109	54.20	−9.82
Labour	Ronald King Murray	6,775	30.32	−5.66
Liberal	R, McPake	3,458	15.50	New
Majority		5,334	23.87	−4.17
Turnout		22,342	53.10	−20.77
Conservative hold		Swing	-2.05	
