= James Maitland, 7th Earl of Lauderdale =

Scottish earl

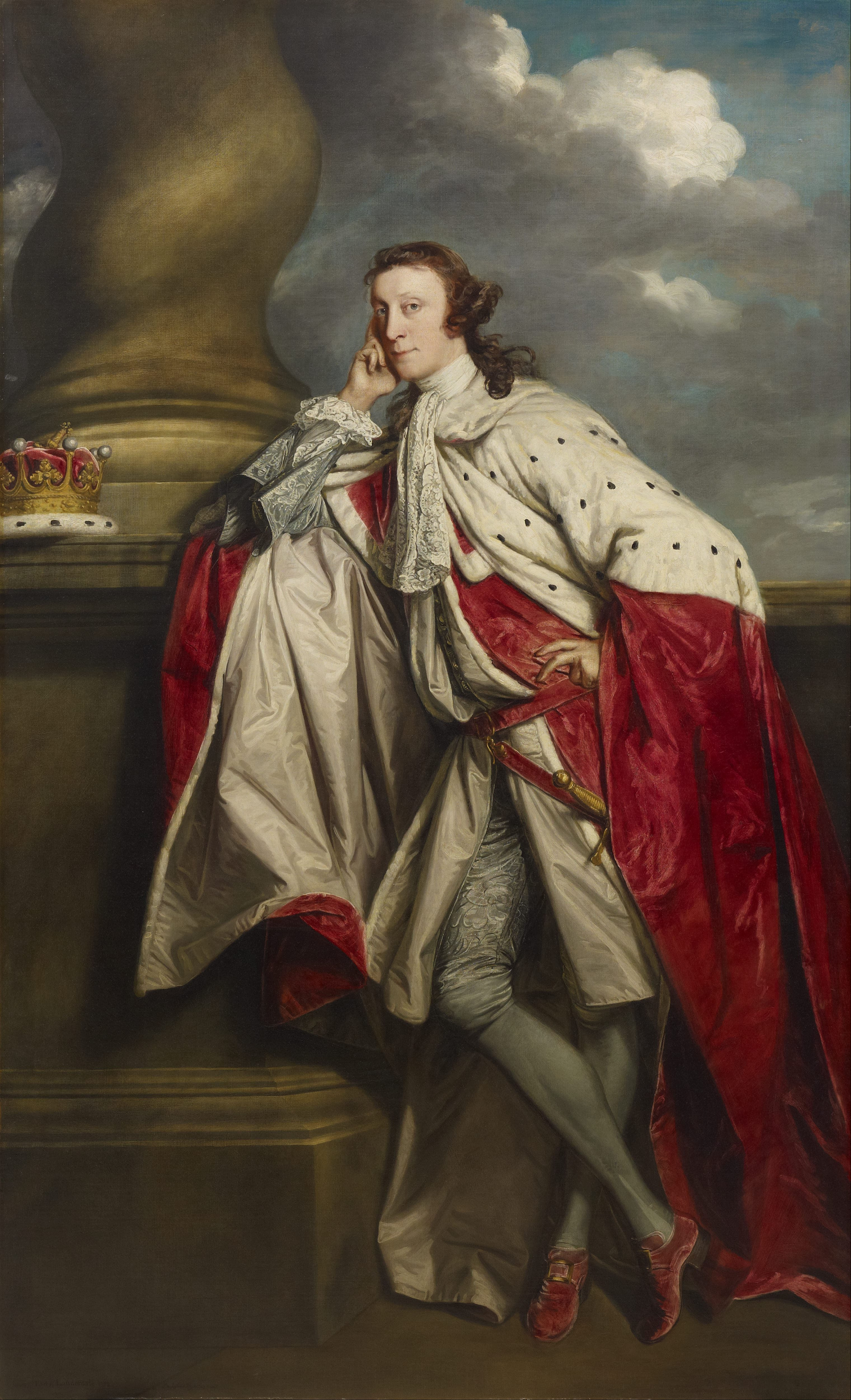
The 7th Earl of Lauderdale. Painting by Sir Joshua Reynolds

James Maitland, 7th Earl of Lauderdale (25 January 1718 – 17 August 1789), and was one of the sixteen Scottish representative peers in the House of Lords.

== Early life ==
James Maitland was born the eldest son of Charles Maitland, 6th Earl of Lauderdale (the second but eldest surviving son of John Maitland, 5th Earl of Lauderdale and Lady Margaret Cunningham) and Lady Elizabeth Ogilvy, daughter of James Ogilvy, 4th Earl of Findlater and Anne Dunbar.

== Career ==
He served for twenty-five years in the army; and was appointed Lieutenant-colonel of the 16th Regiment of Foot on 20 September 1745. He resigned his commission upon the promotion of a junior officer above him.

He was also unlucky under the Heritable Jurisdictions (Scotland) Act 1746 which abolished heritable jurisdictions, when he got for the Regality of Thirlestane and bailiary of Lauderdale £1000, instead of the £8000 he claimed.

He was a Lord of Police from February 1766 until the abolition of that board in 1782; and Rector of the University of Glasgow from 1779 to 1781.

== Death ==
Lord Lauderdale died at Haltoun House.

== Family ==
On 24 April 1749 he married Mary Turner (d. 1789), daughter of Sir Thomas Lombe, Knt., Alderman of the City of London, by whom he obtained a large fortune. They had twelve children, 6 boys and 6 girls.

His son and heir, James Maitland, 8th Earl of Lauderdale began his career as a revolutionary in France and later made a name for himself as one of Britain's leading economic thinkers, who first identified the economic significance and effect on economic growth of budget surpluses and deficits. This thinking was later developed and systematised by Lord Keynes. The third son was Lieutenant-General Sir Thomas Maitland, GCB, GCH (1759–1824), governor and commander-in-chief at Ceylon, then of Malta and the Ionian Islands.

Academic offices
Preceded by Andrew Stewart of Torrance	Rector of the University of Glasgow; 1779–1781	Succeeded by Henry Dundas
Peerage of Scotland
Preceded by Charles Maitland	Earl of Lauderdale; 1779-1789	Succeeded by James Maitland
