= Gerald Maitland-Carew =

British Army officer (born 1941)

Captain The Honourable Gerald Maitland-Carew CVO

Lord Lieutenant of Roxburgh, Ettrick and Lauderdale
- In office 28 March 2007 – 28 December 2016
- Preceded by: June Paterson-Brown
- Succeeded by: Richard Scott, 10th Duke of Buccleuch

Personal details
- Born: Gerald Edward Ian Conolly-Carew; 28 December 1941 (age 84)

Captain The Honourable Gerald Edward Ian Maitland-Carew (born 28 December 1941) is a former Lord Lieutenant of Roxburgh, Ettrick and Lauderdale.

== Early life and education ==
Maitland-Carew was born into an Anglo-Irish aristocratic family, the second son of William Conolly-Carew, 6th Baron Carew, and his Scottish wife, Lady Sylvia Gwendoline Maitland, daughter of Ian Maitland, 15th Earl of Lauderdale.

He was educated at Harrow School.

His father, Lord Carew, was the owner of Castletown House in Celbridge, County Kildare, which is possibly the largest country house still standing (and not a ruin) anywhere in Ireland. As the Maitland's male entail had been broken, he inherited Thirlestane Castle through his mother in 1971, when he also assumed the surname of Maitland-Carew by deed poll. He is now trustee of both the Thirlestane Castle and Mellerstain House Charitable Trusts.

== Career ==
Maitland-Carew served in the 15th/19th The King's Royal Hussars, reaching the rank of Captain. He is today a member of the Territorial Army Committee, and is a Brigadier of the Royal Company of Archers.

Maitland-Carew was chairman of the Lauderdale and Gala Water Branch of the Royal British Legion Scotland between 1974 and 2004, of Musselburgh Racecourse between 1988 and 1998 as well as of the Gurkha Welfare Trust in Scotland between 1996 and 2003. For the International League for Protection of Horses, he was first chairman from 1999 to 2006, and is for a short time its vice-president. Since 1982, Maitland-Carew is chairman and also host of the Scottish Horse Trials Championships at Thirlestane Castle, and since 1989 has been a member of the Jockey Club.

Maitland-Carew was Lord Lieutenant of Roxburgh, Ettrick and Lauderdale in Scotland from March 2007 until December 2016, prior to which he was Deputy Lieutenant from 1989 to 2007.

== Honours ==
Maitland-Carew was appointed Commander of the Royal Victorian Order (CVO) in the 2016 Birthday Honours.

== Marriage and children ==
Maitland-Carew married Rosalind Averil Speke in 1972. They have two sons and a daughter:

- Emma Rosalind Maitland-Carew (born 15 December 1974)
- Edward Ian Conolly Maitland-Carew (born 5 November 1976)
- Peter Gerald Maitland-Carew (born 5 February 1979)

Honorary titles
Preceded by June Paterson-Brown	Lord Lieutenant of Roxburgh, Ettrick and Lauderdale; 2007–2016	Succeeded by The Duke of Buccleuch
