= Jane Scott, Duchess of Buccleuch =

British duchess and model

Her Grace The Duchess of Buccleuch and Queensberry
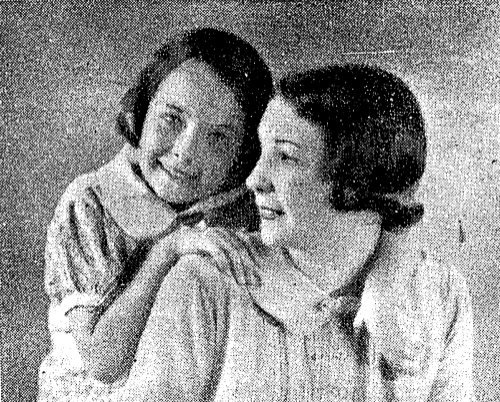
- Jane McNeill and her mother in Shanghai in 1938
- Born: Jane McNeill; 19 December 1929; Shanghai, Republic of China
- Died: 18 April 2011 (aged 81); London, England
- Spouse: John Scott, 9th Duke of Buccleuch (m. 1953; died 2007)
- Issue: Richard Scott, 10th Duke of Buccleuch; Lord John Scott; Lady Charlotte-Anne Scott; Lord Damian Scott
- Parents: John McNeill; Amy Maynard

Jane Montagu Douglas Scott, Duchess of Buccleuch and Queensberry (née McNeill; 19 December 1929 – 18 April 2011) was a British duchess and model. She was a fashion model for Norman Hartnell before marrying John Scott, Earl of Dalkeith, the future 9th Duke of Buccleuch and 11th Duke of Queensberry.

== Early life ==
The Duchess, the only child of John McNeill, QC, and his wife Amy, née Maynard, was born in Shanghai. Her father was in practice as a barrister in Shanghai and was Crown Advocate of the British Supreme Court for China from 1940 to 1942.

On the onset of the Second Sino-Japanese War in 1937, she and her mother were sent to live at the family house in Argyll, although they both returned to Shanghai later. The future duchess attended Abbot's Hill School before starting to model for Norman Hartnell. Her father was appointed acting Crown Advocate in 1939 and to the substantive position in 1940. He was interned by the Japanese at the start of the Pacific War in 1941. He returned to England after an exchange of internees in 1942. After the war he returned to Asia to practice at the bar in Hong Kong. Jane McNeill regularly featured in the society columns of Hong Kong's newspapers.

== Marriage ==
McNeill's marriage to Lord Dalkeith on 10 January 1953 at St. Giles's Cathedral, Edinburgh, attracted media attention, as Dalkeith had earlier been considered a potential husband of Queen Elizabeth II's sister, Princess Margaret. Her wedding was a society event. Herbert Howells's organ piece, Siciliano for a High Ceremony, was written for and first performed on the occasion. McNeill wore a wedding dress designed by Hardy Amies.

Lord Dalkeith, a Conservative Member of Parliament, was thrown off a horse in 1971, and, as a result, remained paralysed from the chest down. He carried on in the House of Commons due to Lady Dalkeith's perseverance, although she herself was a sympathiser of the Scottish National Party. On the death of her father-in-law, Walter, in 1973, Lady Dalkeith became known as the Duchess of Buccleuch and Queensberry. The new duchess took courses in conservation and got involved in the Duke of Buccleuch collection. She served as a director of Buccleuch Estates. In 1979, she produced a recipe book containing McNeill family recipes and those found in Buccleuch cookbooks.

The duchess was widowed in 2007 and died in London in 2011.

== Issue ==
The Duke and Duchess of Buccleuch and Queensberry had four children:

- Richard Scott, 10th Duke of Buccleuch (b. 1954), married Lady Elizabeth Kerr, daughter of the Marquess of Lothian, and has issue; two sons and two daughters.
- Lord John (born 9 August 1957), married Berrin Torolsan, and lives in Istanbul, Turkey.
- Lady Charlotte-Anne (born 9 January 1966), married Count Bernard de Castellane in 1991, and has issue; two sons and a daughter.
- Lord Damian (born 8 October 1969), married Elizabeth Powis, and has issue.
