= John McNeill (lawyer) =

Chairman of the Hong Kong Bar Association

John McNeill QC
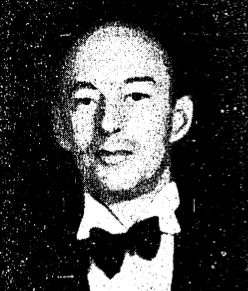

British Crown Advocate for China
- In office 1940–1942
- Preceded by: Victor Priestwood
- Succeeded by: Position abolished

Personal details
- Born: 18 May 1899
- Died: 14 March 1982 (aged 82)

John McNeil QC (1899–1982) served as the last Crown Advocate of the British Supreme Court for China from 1940 to 1942. He also served as the Chairman of the Hong Kong Bar Association on three occasions in the 1950s.

== Early life ==
McNeill was born on 18 May 1899. His maternal aunt was the artist Vera Waddington.

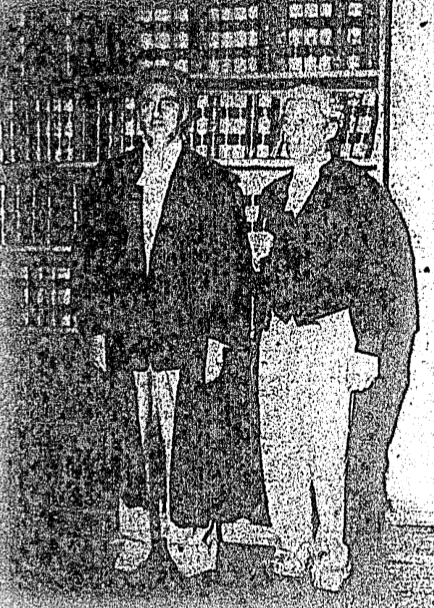
Acting Chief Justice Ernest Williams and John McNeill KC (right) on McNeill's admission as a King's Counsel in 1950

John McNeill was educated at Charterhouse School and Trinity College, Oxford where he studied Classics and took an honours degree in Litterae Humaniores (Greats). He also gained a half blue for fencing. During World War I, he signed up to join the army despite not having finished his studies, and in December 1917 he joined the Guards Brigade. In the spring of 1918 he obtained a commission in the Royal Highlanders, Black Watch, and served in France and Germany with the first Battalion.

After demobilisation he returned to Oxford and in 1923 was called to the bar of the Inner Temple and then practised as a barrister in London.

== Legal career ==
In 1926 McNeill moved to Shanghai to practice before the British Supreme Court for China. He was admitted by judge Peter Grain on the motion of the Crown Advocate, Allan Mossop.

In 1937, he acted as Crown Advocate of the court in the absence of the Crown Advocate, Victor Priestwood. In 1939, Priestwood's appointment as Crown Advocate was terminated. After acting in the position for a few months, McNeil was appointed the Crown Advocate with effect from 1 January 1940.

On 8 December 1941, Japanese troops occupied the court house of the British Supreme Court in Shanghai. McNeill was interned for 5 months before being repatriated to England. His appointment as Crown Advocate was formally terminated in 1942.

After the war, he went to the bar in Hong Kong. He became a King's Counsel (K.C.) in Hong Kong in 1950 (and a Queen's Counsel (Q.C.) when Queen Elizabeth II became Queen in 1952). He was Chairman of the Hong Kong Bar Association in 1952, 1955–1956 and 1958.

== Daughter's marriage ==
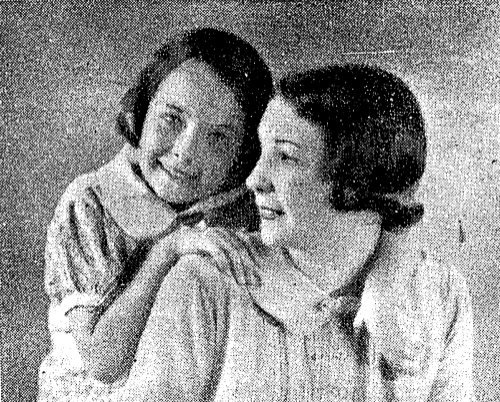
McNeill's wife, Amy, and his daughter, Jane, in Shanghai in 1938

McNeill married the former Amy Yvonne Maynard, a concert pianist, daughter of Francis Maynard, in 1927. Their only daughter, Jane (19 December 1929 – 18 April 2011), became a model and in 1953 at the age of 23, married the Earl of Dalkeith who was later to become the Duke of Buccleuch, making her the Duchess of Buccleuch. McNeill gave her away at the wedding which was attended by the Queen.

== Retirement ==
McNeill retired to Scotland in 1960. His wife died in 1977, and he died on 14 March 1982.
