= Crown advocate =

Government prosecutors in various countries

Crown advocate is a title used in Britain and some former British colonies for a government prosecutor. In former British Colonies and certain British extraterritorial courts the title is (or was) used by the senior government advocate.

== Great Britain ==
In the United Kingdom, there are three levels of crown advocate as well as senior and principal crown advocates employed by the Crown Prosecution Service (CPS).

Level One crown advocates conduct the prosecution of non-jury work, usually in the Magistrates' Court. As well as all non-jury work, level 2 crown advocates conduct jury trials in the Crown Court, ranging from straightforward, very short trials to those of medium length and complexity towards the top end of level 2. Level Three crown advocates conduct jury trials in the more serious and complex cases. Senior crown advocates conduct jury trials in very serious, sensitive and complex cases, including rape, substantial historic child abuse, homicide cases and cases involving issues of national security. Principal crown advocates conduct advocacy in the CPS' complex cases across areas and casework divisions and perform at a standard expected of a King's Counsel.

== British Supreme Court for China and Japan ==
The position of Crown Advocate was created in the British Supreme Court for China and Japan in 1878 and existed until 1943 when the court was abolished. The first holder of the position was Nicholas John Hannen. The position was similar to the position of an Attorney General in a colony. The Crown Advocate was not a full-time employee of the Foreign Office but received payment for acting as Crown Advocate. The Crown Advocate was allowed to accept cases from private clients that did not conflict with his role as Crown Advocate.

== Malta ==
The position of Crown Advocate was created in 1839 to replace the office of Attorney General. The position was abolished in 1922 and taken over by the Treasury Counsel. In 1936, the role of Treasury Counsel was taken over by the newly re-created office of Attorney General.

== Australia ==
=== New South Wales ===
The Crown Advocate is appointed under the provisions of the Crown Advocate Act, 1979 (Act No.59).

The Crown Advocate advises the Attorney General, particularly on questions arising under the criminal law, and appears for the NSW Government in criminal proceedings of special significance Under the Act the Crown Advocate assists the Solicitor General in respect of the exercise or discharge by the Solicitor General of any powers, authorities, duties or functions delegated by the Attorney General under section 4 of the Solicitor General Act, 1969.

=== South Australia ===
The Crown Advocate is responsible for the conduct of the State’s major civil and commercial litigation, and will act as senior trial counsel in more complex matters.

=== Tasmania ===
From 1973 to 1986 the senior government prosecutor in Tasmania was known as the Crown Advocate. The title was changed to Director of Public Prosecutions in 1986.

== See also ==
- King's Advocate
- Crown counsel
