= Bowhill House =

Country house in the Scottish Borders, UK

Coordinates: 55.5404°N 2.9118°W

Designations

Inventory of Gardens and Designed Landscapes in Scotland
- Official name: Bowhill
- Designated: 1 July 1987
- Reference no.: GDL00065

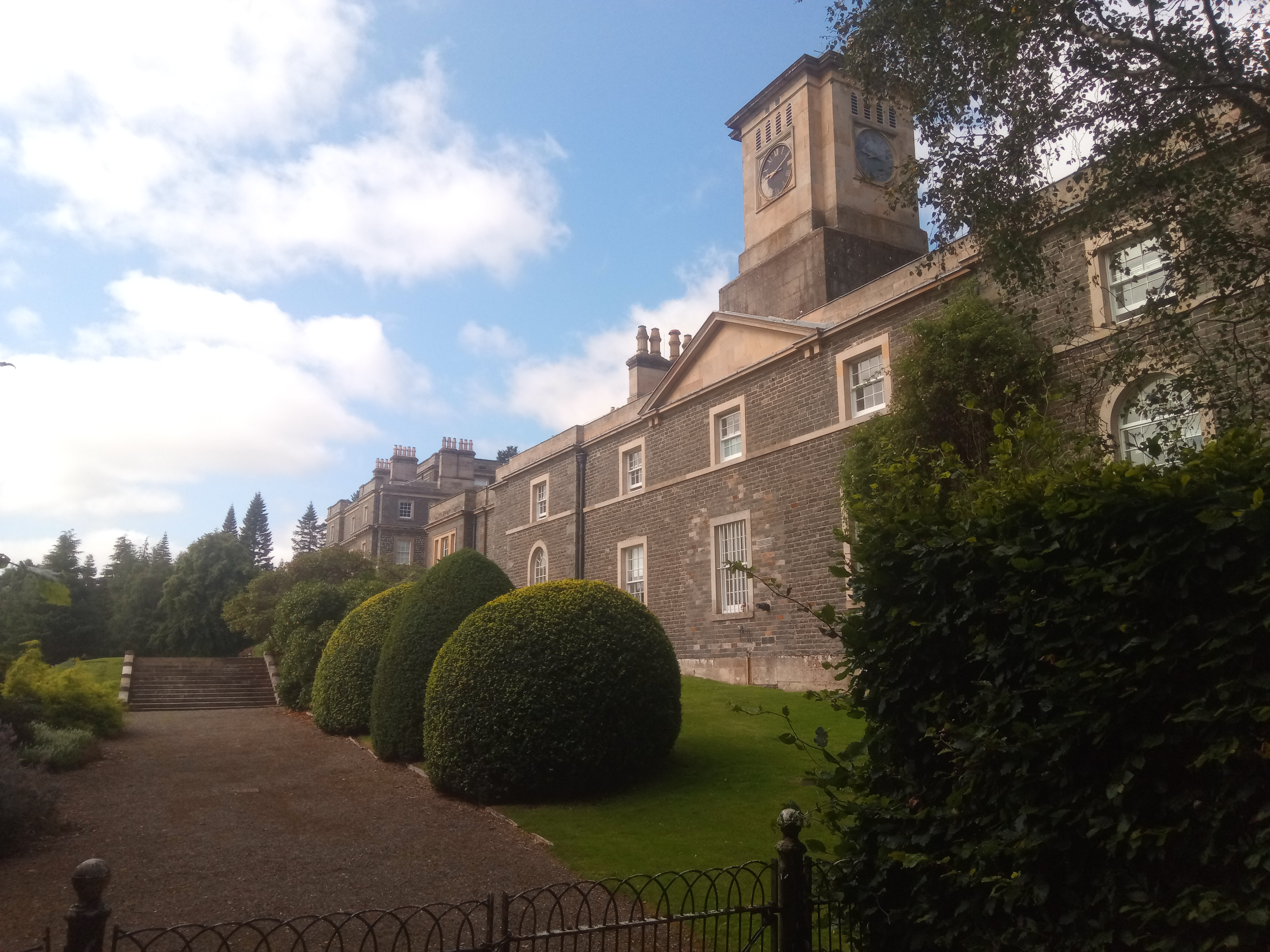
Bowhill House

Bowhill House is a historic house near Bowhill at Selkirk in the Scottish Borders area of Scotland. It is a member of the Historic Houses Association, and is one of the homes of the Duke of Buccleuch. The house is protected as a Category A listed building, and the grounds are listed on the Inventory of Gardens and Designed Landscapes in Scotland.

== History ==
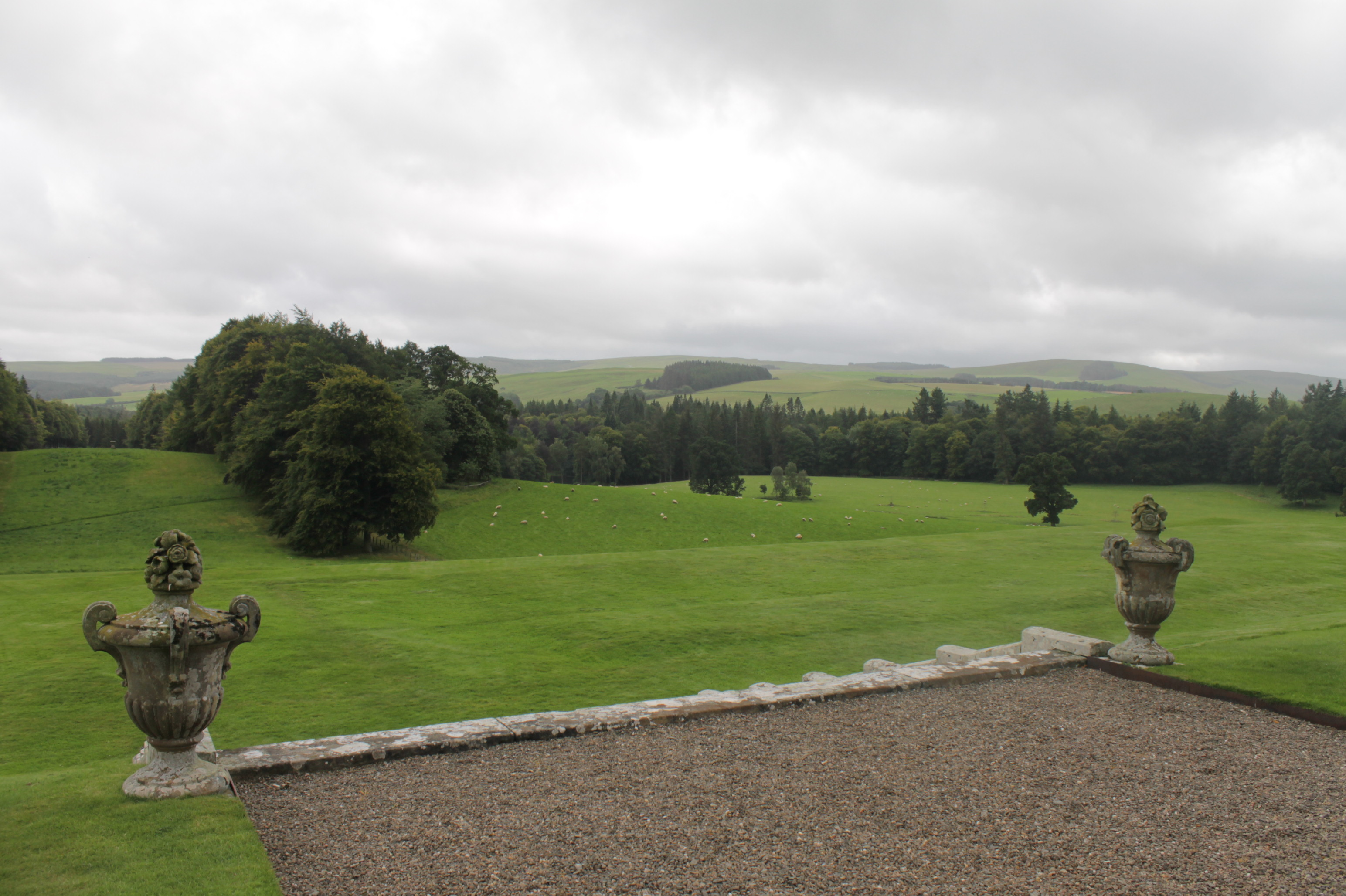
View south from Bowhill House, Selkirkshire

A house was first built at Bowhill in 1708 by John Murray, Lord Bowhill, a Scottish law lord. His brother William Murray had bought the land earlier in 1690. In 1747, Francis Scott, 2nd Duke of Buccleuch, bought Bowhill for his son Lord Charles Scott who wanted to stand for Parliament in Roxburgh or Selkirk.

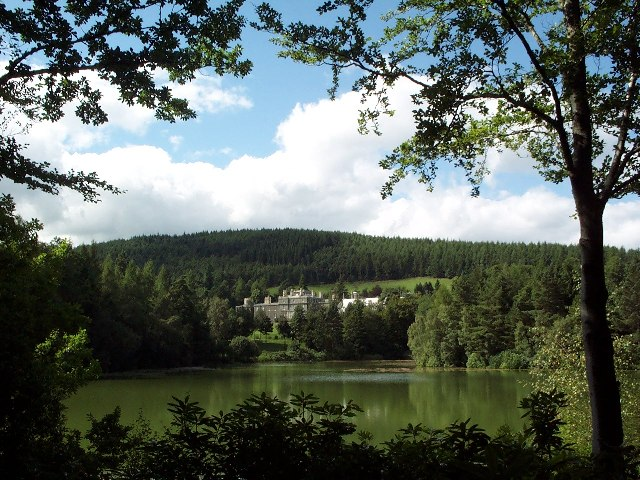
Bowhill House across the Upper Loch

In 1767, Henry, the third Duke, started to plant forests in the grounds, and in 1800, the 4th Duke Charles started to revamp what was an occasional summer house and turned it into a villa with gallery hall. The Buccleagh art collection was created as Charles and Elizabeth brought together the three family heritages of Montagu, Douglas and Scott.

Walter, 5th Duke, made many changes and, in 1831, moved the entrance from south to north. The building was finally completed in 1876 when it was 437 feet (133 m) long.

Bowhill House is home to part of one of the world's greatest private art collections. In the dining room are works by Canaletto, Gainsborough, and Reynolds. The collection has been gathered over 600 years and it includes 1,000 miniatures and 500 paintings as well as objets d'art. The Buccleuch collection of miniatures is said to be second only to the Royal Collection. The whole collection is exhibited at three locations: Bowhill, Drumlanrig Castle and Boughton House.

The gardens and the house are open to the public. The facilities include walks and an adventure playground.

== See also ==
- List of places in the Scottish Borders
- Treasure Houses of Britain – 1985 TV series with information on Bowhill, as well as other Buccleuch properties
