= Greyhound 2 =

Upcoming war film by Aaron Schneider

- Directed by: Aaron Schneider
- Written by: Tom Hanks; Aaron Schneider
- Based on: Characters appearing in The Good Shepherd by C. S. Forester
- Produced by: Gary Goetzman
- Starring: Tom Hanks; Stephen Graham; Rob Morgan; Elisabeth Shue; Eric Lange
- Cinematography: Shelly Johnson
- Production companies: Stage 6 Films; Playtone
- Distributed by: Apple Original Films
- Country: United States
- Language: English

Greyhound 2 is an upcoming American war film directed by Aaron Schneider and starring Tom Hanks, who also wrote the screenplay with Schneider. It serves as the sequel to Greyhound (2020). Stephen Graham, Rob Morgan, and Elisabeth Shue also reprise their roles from the first film.

== Cast ==
- Tom Hanks as Commander Ernest Krause
- Stephen Graham as Lieutenant Commander Charlie Cole
- Rob Morgan as George Cleveland
- Elisabeth Shue as Eva Frechette
- Jack Patten
- James Udom
- Jonathan von Mering
- Johnathon Schaech
- Eric Lange

== Production ==
In April 2022, it was announced that a sequel to Greyhound (2020) was in development. In April 2025, Aaron Schneider and Tom Hanks were confirmed to be returning from the first film, with the core cast from the original also in talks to return.

Principal photography began in February 2026, in Sydney, with Stephen Graham, Rob Morgan, and Elisabeth Shue reprising their roles from the first, alongside Jack Patten. James Udom, Jonathan von Mering, Johnathon Schaech, and Eric Lange joined the cast in March.
