= My Husband's Wife (novel) =

2026 thriller novel by Alice Feeney

- Book cover
- Author: Alice Feeney
- Audio read by: Richard Armitage; Bel Powley; Henry Rowley
- Language: English
- Genre: Psychological thriller
- Set in: Cornwall; London
- Publisher: Flatiron Books
- Publication date: 2026
- Publication place: United Kingdom
- Pages: 320
- ISBN: 9781250337818

My Husband's Wife is a 2026 psychological thriller novel by British author Alice Feeney. The novel centres on the mysterious disappearance of reclusive artist Eden Fox, who returns home to find a stranger inside her house claiming to be her.

== Plot ==
London DCI Olivia "Birdy" Bird learns that she has inherited Spyglass—a cliffside home in the Cornish village of Hope Falls—from her estranged grandmother. Birdy, recently diagnosed with terminal cancer, sells the home to Harrison Wolfe and his reclusive artist wife Eden Fox. Harrison is the CEO of Thanatos, a pharmaceutical company which claims to predict a person's exact date of death. Birdy uses Thanatos' services and learns her predicted death date is November 2nd.

Six months later, Eden returns home one day to discover that her key to Spyglass no longer works. A woman who resembles her answers the door, claiming that she is actually Eden. Harrison arrives and also seems not to recognise Eden, saying that the impostor is his wife instead. Eden is apprehended by police sergeant Luke Carter, who is sceptical of her story when she cannot immediately prove her identity.

Evading arrest, Eden breaks into Spyglass to find that her possessions and photographs are missing. She visits her 18-year-old daughter Gabriella, who lives in a residential care home and has had selective mutism since she was hit by a car 10 years ago. When Eden arrives, Gabriella suddenly speaks, denying that Eden is her mother. A mysterious text message tells Eden to go to the cliffs at Hope Falls, where she is pushed to her death.

Birdy decides to leave her post in London and spend her final days in Hope Falls; she tells Carter that she is his new boss. Carter and Birdy investigate Eden's disappearance. Eden's body washes up on the beach, battered and unrecognisable, and DNA samples from a hairbrush at Spyglass do not match the body. Birdy sleeps with Carter, but she later learns that he is in a loveless marriage with his wife Jane.

At Gabriella's care home, Carter encounters the impostor, whose name is Mary Kendall; she runs away when he pursues her. Mary is Gabriella's carer, and also cared for Birdy's grandmother at Spyglass before her death. Mary is having an affair with Harrison and has been pretending to be Eden around Hope Falls. Carter recently met Mary (as "Eden") at the police station, where she flirted with and kissed him.

Carter discovers that Birdy is only pretending to be his boss; she resigned her post in London without taking another job. Furthermore, it is revealed that Birdy is Harrison's ex-wife and Gabriella's biological mother; Eden is Gabriella's stepmother. Birdy was responsible for Gabriella's accident 10 years ago, colliding with Gabriella in the street after being distracted by a phone call. After the accident, Harrison divorced Birdy and married Eden, Gabriella's nanny.

Since coming to Hope Falls six months ago, Birdy has been visiting Gabriella, who is regaining her speech with Mary's help. Gabriella revealed to Birdy that she was injured not by the car accident, but by Eden throwing her down the stairs after Gabriella saw Eden and Harrison in bed together. Eden then planted Gabriella's body in the road and caused the accident by calling Birdy's phone.

When they learned the truth, Birdy, Harrison, and Mary plotted revenge against Eden—stealing her identity and tormenting her psychologically before killing her. Harrison convinced Eden to move to Hope Falls and promised to give Spyglass to Mary for her role in the plot. Birdy's role was to mislead Carter's investigation and push Eden off the cliff; however, Birdy claims that Eden was already gone when she arrived.

After midnight on November 2nd, Birdy attempts to overdose on medication, deciding to die on her own terms. Carter discovers Birdy unconscious and performs CPR. Meanwhile, Harrison and Mary flee Hope Falls and withdraw Gabriella from her care home.

One year later, Birdy is living at Spyglass; her cancer is in remission. Harrison, Mary, and Gabriella are in Switzerland; Gabriella continues to recover and visits Birdy once a month. Carter keeps quiet about the plot to kill Eden in exchange for Harrison paying off his mortgage. In an epilogue, it is revealed that Carter's wife Jane saw Mary kissing Carter at the police station. Despondent, Jane intended to jump off the cliffs at Hope Falls; however, she encountered Eden there—mistaking her for Mary—and pushed her off instead.

== Background ==
In an interview, Feeney said that she was inspired to write My Husband's Wife when she returned home one day to find a stranger in her house; in reality, her husband had let the person inside. Feeney also said that the character of Birdy "lived inside my head for years before the right story came along for her to inhabit."

== Publication history ==
In a six-figure deal, Pan Fiction acquired UK and Commonwealth rights to My Husband's Wife, as well as a future novel, in May 2025. North American rights were acquired by sister company Flatiron Books.

The audiobook of My Husband's Wife was narrated by Richard Armitage, Bel Powley, and Henry Rowley. Armitage had previously narrated other audiobooks of Feeney's novels, including Beautiful Ugly, Rock Paper Scissors, and His & Hers.

== Reception ==
My Husband's Wife appeared on multiple weekly bestseller lists, including The New York Times, USA Today, Publishers Weekly, and NielsenIQ's BookData Independent Bookshop Top 20.

In The Washington Post, E.A. Aymar called My Husband's Wife a "beguiling thriller" and "a funny, sexy, thoroughly satisfying read." Ina Molakava, for RTL Today, called the novel "a masterclass in suspense", praising its character development, eerie setting, and constant cliffhangers. Nabila Mayet-Cassim, for TimesLIVE, said the book was "gripping, entertaining, and undeniably addictive" and praised its "delicious sense of unease", but added that the plot "stretches credulity" and was difficult to follow. For Marie Claire, Andrea Park listed My Husband's Wife among the best mystery-thrillers of 2026, calling it "an unputdownable sprint to figure out what's real, who's lying, and what's actually going on."

Reviewing the audiobook of My Husband's Wife in Booklist, Shelley Zeigler called it "a dark, twisted tale of deception, love, and grief" and a "gripping psychological thriller enhanced by an immersive, sound-rich listening experience." Kirkus Reviews said the novel had "shocking truths" and praised the audiobook's "three accomplished narrators". Lauren Hackert, for Library Journal, said the audiobook "will appeal to listeners seeking an intricate psychological suspense about deception and revenge, presented as an engrossing listening experience."

== Adaptation ==
In January 2026, My Husband's Wife was optioned by British production company Carnival Films, with plans to adopt the novel for television with screenwriter Emilia di Girolamo.
