= David Wyman (sound engineer) =

American sound engineer

- Occupation: Sound engineer

David Wyman is an American sound engineer. He was nominated for an Academy Award in the category Best Sound for the film Greyhound.

== Selected filmography ==
- Greyhound (2020; co-nominated with Warren Shaw, Michael Minkler and Beau Borders)
