= My Husband's Wife =

My Husband's Wife may refer to:

- My Husband's Wife (novel), a 2026 novel by Alice Feeney
- My Husband's Wife (film), a 1970 film by Mahmoud Zulfikar
- Mere Husband Ki Biwi, a 2025 film by Mudassar Aziz
