= Sometimes I Lie =

2017 thriller novel by Alice Feeney

- Book cover
- Author: Alice Feeney
- Audio read by: Stephanie Racine
- Language: English
- Genre: Psychological thriller
- Set in: London
- Publisher: HQ
- Publication date: 2017
- Publication place: United Kingdom
- Pages: 384
- ISBN: 9780008225353

Sometimes I Lie is a 2017 psychological thriller novel, the debut of British author Alice Feeney. It follows Amber Reynolds, who lies in a coma in hospital after a car crash, unable to move or remember what happened. Through flashback chapters from before the crash and from her childhood, Amber pieces together how she ended up there, all while warning the reader that "sometimes I lie."

== Plot ==
Amber Reynolds is a 35-year-old presenter on the radio show Coffee Morning. Her famous co-presenter Madeline is haughty and rude behind her charitable façade. Amber's marriage to Paul is strained, and they have struggled with infertility. Meanwhile, Amber and her sister Claire have a close yet fraught relationship: Claire is possessive of Amber and drives away anyone she deems unworthy of her.

Flashback chapters from Claire's childhood diaries reveal that Amber is actually Claire's adoptive sister. The girls were initially best friends at school; Claire was drawn to Amber (then known by her surname "Taylor") to escape her unhappy home life. After Claire's grandmother died, Claire's aunt—whom she barely knew—forced her parents to sell their house in order to claim her share of the inheritance. Claire intentionally destroyed the house in a gas explosion, killing her parents; Amber's family later adopted Claire.

When Amber's boss warns her that Madeline wants her replaced, Amber and her colleague Jo—her only friend at work—plot to save her job. Amber secretly switches on Madeline's microphone before an interview, causing Madeline's vulgar rant about a children's charity to be broadcast on national television. Madeline later resigns.

It is revealed that Madeline is Claire's aunt and godmother—and lives in Claire's childhood house, now rebuilt. As an adult, Claire discovered Madeline's identity and became obsessed with revenge. She recruited Amber to help her; Amber only took the radio job at Claire's suggestion to get closer to Madeline.

Leaving work one day, Amber runs into Edward, her ex-boyfriend from university. When Amber and Edward broke up, Claire anonymously sent false accusations about Edward to his medical school, and then lied to Edward that Amber was responsible. After they catch up twice over drinks, Amber wakes up in Edward's bed with memory loss. She flees after finding photos of herself displayed around his flat. Edward later tries to blackmail Amber into rekindling their relationship; when she refuses, he assaults her and gives her bruises.

On Christmas Day, Paul tells Claire that he discovered her childhood diaries, which contain Claire's retelling of the gas explosion. Fearing Claire's wrath, Amber confronts Claire, who suspects that Paul has already read the diaries; she suggests that he needs to be "dealt with". Noticing that Amber is bleeding, Claire realises she is pregnant and offers to drive her to hospital. However, Claire deliberately crashes the car, causing Amber to miscarry.

Regaining awareness in hospital on Boxing Day, Amber finds that she is comatose and immobilised. She cannot remember the crash or open her eyes, but can hear and understand those around her. When Paul and Claire visit her, Amber manages to move a finger, giving them hope that she is still conscious.

Amber realises that her parents, whom she has been imagining at her bedside, died more than a year earlier. Amber's colleague Jo is not real either—she is Amber's imaginary friend from childhood. During a bedside visit from "Jo", Amber admits to herself that she was merely Madeline's personal assistant, not her co-presenter.

An unknown man enters Amber's hospital room, deletes her phone voicemails, and tells her the crash was her fault. He gropes her and reveals that he is drugging her to keep her comatose. The man is revealed to be Edward, now a hospital porter; Claire's accusations ruined his ambitions of becoming a doctor. Edward later taunts Amber before raping her and fleeing.

Amber gradually emerges from her coma and remembers the night of the crash. She confronts Claire, who gaslights her and denies crashing the car intentionally.

Six weeks after waking up, Amber drugs Claire and her husband before disposing of them in a gas explosion. She also hints that she has killed Edward; police have found traces of blood and skin inside his sunbed. Amber frames Madeline for Claire's murder, forging letters in Madeline's handwriting to suggest that Claire was blackmailing Madeline. She then burns Claire's diaries, which reveal that it was Amber who suggested the original gas explosion.

Months later, Amber and Paul have repaired their marriage and adopted Claire's two children. While on holiday, Amber receives a shocking delivery to her hotel room: the bracelet that Claire stole from her as a child.

== Background ==
Feeney wrote in an essay for The Washington Post: "The facets of deceit fascinate me, so I wrote a story that asks: Is something a lie if you believe it’s the truth?" She noted the popularity of other books with the word "Lie" in the title, suggesting that this was "because, in a society divided by social, political and religious beliefs, lying is something that unites us".

In an interview with the Washington Independent Review of Books, Feeney said that "I love unreliable narrators and I liked the idea of one who confessed about who and what she was from the very beginning. Amber isn’t just unreliable for the readers, she’s unreliable for herself".

Feeney finished writing Sometimes I Lie in the Scottish Highlands. After the book's success, she continued the tradition of returning to Scotland to write; she later set her novel Beautiful Ugly there.

== Reception ==
Sometimes I Lie appeared on the New York Times Best Seller list in the "Audio Fiction" category. It has been translated into more than 20 languages.

For Entertainment Weekly, Leah Greenblatt gave Sometimes I Lie a grade of B+; she said that Feeney was a "shrewd, skillful" author, though she felt that the novel's "outrageous" twists delivered "diminishing returns". Publishers Weekly called Sometimes I Lie a "bold if overambitious debut, a serpentine tale of betrayal, madness, and murder" and said that Feeney was "definitely a writer to watch." Kirkus Reviews wrote that the book "eventually begins to sag under the weight of all its plot elements," but called it an "ambitious debut." In a review of the audiobook for Library Journal, Terry Ann Lawler said Sometimes I Lie was "a fun thriller with a terrifically twisted ending", praising the narrator's performance as "the story becomes more and more convoluted".

== Adaptation ==
In 2019, it was announced that Sarah Michelle Gellar would star in a limited series based on Sometimes I Lie, with Robin Swicord as writer and Gellar, Swicord, Ellen DeGeneres, and Jeff Kleeman as executive producers. After this option lapsed, the rights were picked up by Tommy Harper and Matt Charman in 2024, with Charman and Caryl Lewis as writers.
