= Warren Shaw (sound editor) =

American sound editor and engineer

- Occupation: Sound editor
- Years active: 1992–present

Warren Shaw is an American sound editor and engineer. He was nominated for an Academy Award in the category Best Sound for the film Greyhound.

In addition to his Academy Award nomination, he won a Primetime Emmy Award and was nominated for another one in the category Outstanding Sound Editing for his work on the television program The Night Of, and also the television film Jane. He was also nominated for an International Cinephile Society Award in the category Best Sound Design for the film Uncut Gems. He has collaborated three times with the director Bill Condon, including on the 2017 Disney film Beauty and the Beast.

== Selected filmography ==
- Beauty and the Beast (2017)
- Uncut Gems (2019)
- Greyhound (2020; co-nominated with Michael Minkler, Beau Borders and David Wyman)
