= Crystal R. Fox =

American actress and singer

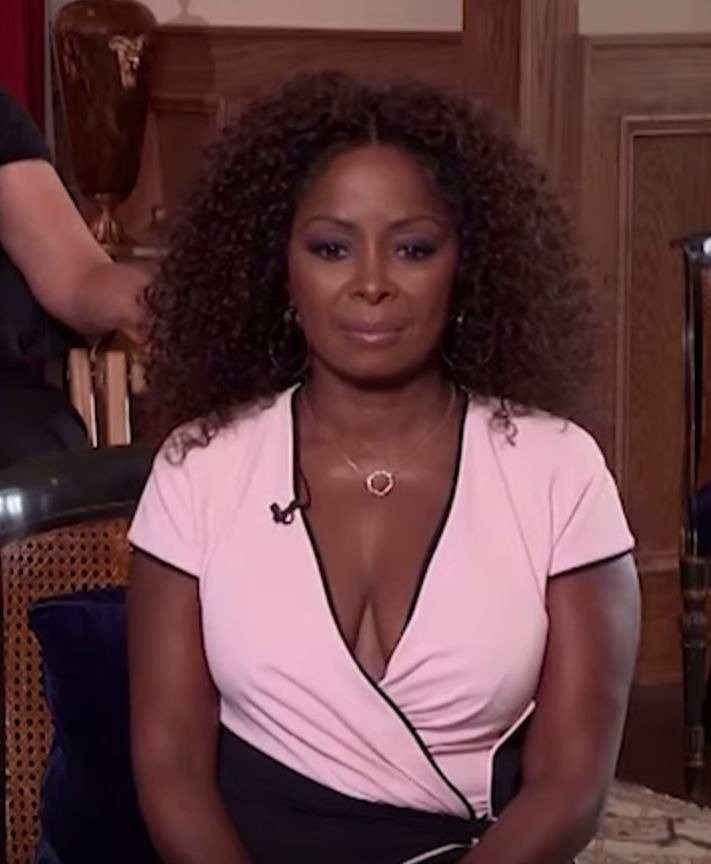
- Fox in 2020
- Born: January 1, 1964 (age 62); Tryon, North Carolina, U.S.
- Occupations: Actress, singer
- Years active: 1989–present

Crystal R. Fox (born January 1, 1964) is an American actress and singer. Fox has performed in many stage productions during her career, and is known for her television roles as Luann Corbin in the NBC/CBS police drama series In the Heat of the Night (1989–1995), and as Hanna Young in the Oprah Winfrey Network prime time soap opera, The Haves and the Have Nots (2013–2021). Fox has also appeared in a number of films, most notably playing the leading role in the 2020 thriller A Fall from Grace, and the television series Big Little Lies (2019), The Big Door Prize (2023-24) and His & Hers (2026).

== Early life ==
Fox was born in Tryon, North Carolina. She moved from North Carolina to Atlanta, Georgia in 1979 and attended middle school and high school. She began her professional acting career in the late 1970s, appearing on stage in Atlanta. She is the niece of the late singer Nina Simone and cousin of Lisa Simone Kelly.

== Career ==
Fox made her big-screen debut playing Katie Bell in the comedy-drama film Driving Miss Daisy (1989) starring Morgan Freeman and Jessica Tandy. She later joined the cast of NBC police-drama series In the Heat of the Night in its third season, playing Luann Corbin. She was a regular cast member through the series finale in 1995, appearing in more than 100 episodes. In the 1990s, Fox had supporting roles in films Drop Squad (1994) and Once Upon a Time...When We Were Colored (1995) opposite Phylicia Rashad and Al Freeman Jr. She co-starred opposite Cicely Tyson in the 1998 miniseries Mama Flora's Family based on a novel by Alex Haley. On television, she guest-starred on Law & Order, The Sopranos, and Third Watch. Fox also co-starred opposite Phylicia Rashad and Debbie Allen in the 2001 PBS production of The Old Settler.

Fox has appeared in many stage productions during her career. She has worked in New York City, Alexandria, Silver Spring, and Atlanta, where she lives. She received a Helen Hayes Award nomination for her performance in the 2002 play Home. Her other stage credits include For Colored Girls Who Have Considered Suicide / When the Rainbow Is Enuf, Antony and Cleopatra, The Comedy of Errors, A Raisin in the Sun, The Colored Museum, The Amen Corner, The Boys from Syracuse, Bessie's Blues, Little Shop of Horrors and The Rocky Horror Picture Show. She was a member of the Alliance Theatre for many years. She received IRNE Awards and Elliot Norton Awards for Best Actress for playing Rose Maxson in the 2009 production of Fences at the Huntington Theatre Company. During 2014–15, she acted as lead in the play Blues for an Alabama Sky.

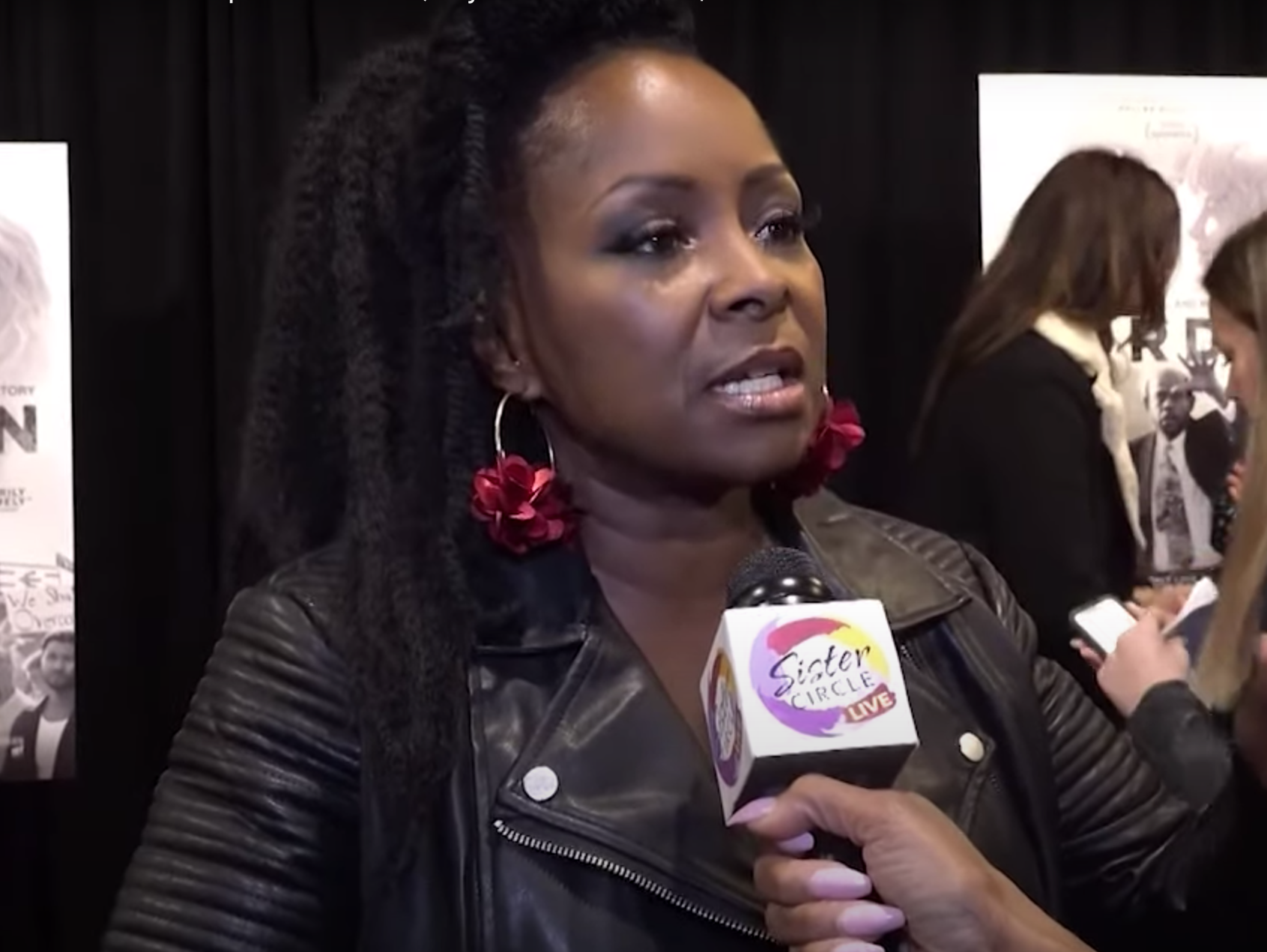
Fox at the Burden premiere

In 2013, Fox began starring in the Oprah Winfrey Network prime time soap opera The Haves and the Have Nots, produced by Tyler Perry. She played one of the show's leading roles, Hanna Young, a soulful single mother who works as the rich Cryer family's maid and also served as the best friend and confidante of the lady of the house, Katheryn Cryer (played by Reneé Lawless). The series also starred Tika Sumpter, Angela Robinson, and John Schneider. Fox received positive reviews for her performance in the show. The series ended in 2021, after 196 episodes.

In 2019, Fox was cast for the second season of the HBO drama series Big Little Lies as Zoë Kravitz’s character's mother Elizabeth Howard. Along with the cast, she was nominated for Screen Actors Guild Award for Outstanding Performance by an Ensemble in a Drama Series. She co-starred opposite Forest Whitaker in the drama film Burden. The film premiered at the 2018 Sundance Film Festival and won the U.S. Dramatic Audience Award. In 2020, Fox had a leading role in the Netflix thriller film A Fall from Grace. It was Fox's first leading film role in her long career. The film received negative reviews from critics, but her performance was praised by many. Chicago Sun-Times critic Richard Roeper wrote in a review: "Best of all is seeing Crystal Fox getting her moment in the spotlight and absolutely shining." Later in 2020, Fox appeared in the Amazon Prime drama series Utopia created by Gillian Flynn.

In 2021, Fox starred in the three movie adaptations of V. C. Andrews' books for Lifetime. In 2022, she was cast opposite Chris O'Dowd in the Apple TV+ comedy series The Big Door Prize. The series was canceled after two seasons in 2024. Later in 2024, she was cast as the mother of lead character in the Netflix thriller series, His & Hers adapted from the novel by Alice Feeney.

== Filmography ==
=== Film ===
Year	Title	Role	Notes
1989	Driving Miss Daisy	Katie Bell	
1991	Separate but Equal	NAACP telephone receptionist	Television film
1994	Drop Squad	Zora	
1995	Once Upon a Time...When We Were Colored	Miss Doll	
2001	The Old Settler	Lou Bessie	Segment "Charmaine"
2014	Ir/Reconcilable	Pam	Short film
2016	Coffee Klatch	Cindy Mercer	
2018	Burden	Janice Kennedy	
2020	A Fall from Grace	Grace Waters	
2021	V.C. Andrews' Ruby	Mama Dede	
2021	V.C. Andrews' All That Glitters	Mama Dede	
2021	V.C. Andrews' Hidden Jewel	Mama Dede	

=== Television ===
Year	Title	Role	Notes
1989–1995	In the Heat of the Night	Luann Corbin	Series regular, 102 episodes
1996	Savannah	DA Laine Thompkins	Episodes: "From Here to Paternity" and "Creep Throat"
1998	Mama Flora's Family	Ruthana	Miniseries
2001	Law & Order	Mancelli	Episode: "White Lie"
2001	The Sopranos	Nurse	Episode: "Pine Barrens"
2001	Third Watch	Nunez	Episode: "And Zeus Wept"
2010	Tyler Perry's House of Payne	CJ & Janine's nanny/housekeeper, Ms. Willamina	Recurring role, 5 episodes
2013–2021	The Haves and the Have Nots	Hanna Young	Series regular, 196 episodes
2019	Big Little Lies	Elizabeth Howard	Recurring role, 6 episodes Nominated — Screen Actors Guild Award for Outstanding Performance by an Ensemble in a Drama Series
2020	Utopia	Kim	Recurring role, 3 episodes
2023–2024	The Big Door Prize	Izzy	Main role; 13 episodes
2025	Suits LA	Anita Rollins	Recurring role, 3 episodes
2025	The Prophecy	Deborah	Podcast series, 8 episodes Nominated — NAACP Image Award for Outstanding Podcast - Scripted/Limited Series/Short Form
2026	His & Hers	Alice Andrews	Main role Black Reel TV Award for Outstanding Supporting Performance in a TV Movie or Limited Series
TBA	Untitled Cable Guy Project	Lynette	
