= Greyhound (film) =

2020 American war film by Aaron Schneider

- Release poster
- Directed by: Aaron Schneider
- Screenplay by: Tom Hanks
- Based on: The Good Shepherd by C. S. Forester
- Produced by: Gary Goetzman
- Starring: Tom Hanks; Stephen Graham; Rob Morgan; Elisabeth Shue
- Cinematography: Shelly Johnson
- Edited by: Mark Czyzewski; Sidney Wolinsky
- Music by: Blake Neely
- Production companies: Stage 6 Films; FilmNation Entertainment; Bron Creative; Zhengfu Pictures; Playtone; Sycamore Pictures
- Distributed by: Apple Original Films; Sony Pictures Entertainment
- Release date: July 10, 2020
- Running time: 91 minutes
- Country: United States
- Language: English
- Budget: $50.3 million

Greyhound is a 2020 American war film directed by Aaron Schneider and starring Tom Hanks, who also wrote the screenplay. The film is based on the 1955 novel The Good Shepherd by C. S. Forester, and follows a US Navy commander on his first assignment commanding a multi-national escort destroyer group of four, defending an Allied convoy from U-boats during the Battle of the Atlantic. The film also stars Stephen Graham, Rob Morgan, and Elisabeth Shue.

Greyhound was initially scheduled for theatrical release in the United States on June 12, 2020, by Sony Pictures Releasing. The release was delayed indefinitely and then canceled because of widespread disruption and shutdowns from the COVID-19 pandemic. Sony sold the distribution rights to Apple TV+, which released the film digitally on July 10, 2020. It received positive reviews from critics, with praise for the action sequences and effective use of its 90-minute runtime. At the 93rd Academy Awards, the film earned a nomination for Best Sound.

== Plot ==
In February 1942, Allied convoy HX-25, consisting of 37 merchant and troop ships en route for Liverpool, enters the "Black Pit", the Mid-Atlantic gap, where they will be out of range of protective air cover. The convoy's escort consists of the Fletcher-class destroyer USS Keeling (DD-548), radio call sign "Greyhound", captained by Commander Ernest Krause of the United States Navy; the British Tribal-class destroyer HMS James (F80), call sign "Harry"; the Polish Grom-class destroyer ORP Viktor (H34), call sign "Eagle"; and the Canadian Flower-class corvette HMCS Dodge (K136), call sign "Dicky". Krause is overall commander of the escort ships but, despite his seniority and extensive naval education, it is his first wartime command; the captains under him have been at war for more than two years.

Three days into the "Black Pit", high-frequency direction finding intercepts a German transmission and Greyhound detects a U-boat heading towards the convoy. The sub tries to slip under Greyhound, but Krause sinks it with depth charges. As they return to the convoy, another U-boat bearing an emblem of a grey wolf sinks a Greek merchant ship. Greyhound is also attacked, evading a torpedo, and receives reports of five other U-boats from the other escorts. The wolfpack is staying just out of firing range, waiting for nightfall when the escorts will have poor visibility.

That evening, the 'grey wolf' U-boat torpedoes an oil tanker and escapes Greyhound by using an underwater decoy device which deceives the escorts into expending their depth charges. Krause rescues survivors from the tanker before going to aid the other ships, resulting in the loss of another supply ship. The U-boat, identifying itself as "Grey Wolf", taunts the convoy and its escorts via radio transmission. The wolfpack commences attack that night and sinks three more merchant ships.

The next morning, down to just six depth charges, Greyhound joins Dicky and sinks one of the U-boats with combined surface broadsides. Dicky receives minor damage due to the close range, and Greyhound is hit on its port side by the U-boat's deck gun. Mess attendant George Cleveland and two sailors are killed. During their burial service, the Germans sink another Allied ship and badly damage Eagle, which later sinks; Krause allows the crew of Eagle to abandon ship. Although worried about compromising the remaining defenders, Krause chooses to break radio silence; he orders transmission of a single word "help" to the Admiralty. A return message is deciphered as "expect aircraft" and "point X-ray", suggesting reinforcements are en route and their rendezvous point shall be modified.

With the convoy nearly in range of friendly air cover, Greyhound battles two U-boats, sinking the "Grey Wolf" with a full broadside. An RAF Catalina appears and Greyhound marks the location of the second U-boat, allowing the flying boat to sink it with depth charges. When contact is lost with the remaining U-boats, HMS Diamond arrives and relieves Greyhound and the other two destroyers. They are ordered to port for repairs and refitting in Derry. Krause is congratulated personally for the four U-boat kills and men on the convoy ships cheer Greyhound's crew. Krause goes to his cabin, where he finally sleeps.

== Cast ==
- Tom Hanks, as Commander Ernst ("Ernie") Krause
- Elisabeth Shue, as Evie
- Stephen Graham, as Lieutenant Commander Cole
- Rob Morgan, as "compassionate... messmate George Cleveland"
- Manuel Garcia-Rulfo, as Melvin Lopez
- Josh Wiggins, as Talker #1
- Tom Brittney, as Lieutenant Watson
- William Pullen
- Karl Glusman, as Red Eppstein
- Chet Hanks, as Bushnell
- Jimi Stanton
- Matthew Helm, as Lt. Nystrom
- Devin Druid, as Homer Wallace
- Michael Benz, as Lieutenant Carling
- Ian James Corlett, as captain of HMCS Dodge, call sign "Dicky" (voice)
- Dave Davis, as Boatswain's Mate #1
- Dominic Keating, as captain of HMS James, call sign "Harry" (voice)
- Thomas Kretschmann, as Grey Wolf (voice)
- Maximilian Osinski, as captain of ORP Viktor, call sign "Eagle" (voice)
- Joseph Henry Poliquin V, as Lee Helmsman #1 “Forbrick”
- Grayson Russell, as Signalman #1
- Craig Tate, as Pitts

== Production ==
The film was relatively faithful to the novel. In the novel, Krause is more bitter about life as he was divorced from Evelyn, who had been unfaithful to him; in the film, Evelyn is his girlfriend to whom he proposes marriage, but she postpones. The film invents scenes where a U-boat uses Greyhound's transmitting frequency to broadcast taunting messages over the ship's loudspeakers.

The fictionalized Polish Grom-class destroyer ORP Viktor was based on scans taken of the real Grom-class destroyer ORP Błyskawica, a museum ship in Gdynia, Poland. Pre-production photography which took place in January 2018 at sea aboard HMCS Montréal, a frigate of the Royal Canadian Navy. HMCS Sackville, the last surviving Flower-class corvette, was used as the model for the film's corvette, HMCS Dodge; producers took numerous 3D scans of the restored ship's exterior at Halifax, Nova Scotia to create the CGI version of the corvette.

Filming began in March 2018, aboard USS Kidd in Baton Rouge, Louisiana. The actors were trained on the ship.

A fictionalized version of the Kidd is mentioned in the film as having encountered a an underwater decoy device on its first patrol; the actual USS Kidd was not launched until late February 1943. In the studio, sets were created of the bridge and the command center, and a gimbal was used to create the effect of crew and furnishings reacting to the ship rolling.

== Release ==
Greyhound was initially scheduled for theatrical release on March 22, 2019 in the United States by Sony Pictures Releasing under its Columbia Pictures label. After the rapid onset and disruption of the COVID-19 pandemic, the release was delayed to May 8, 2020, and finally to June 12, 2020.

In May 2020, it was announced that Apple TV+ had acquired distribution rights to Greyhound for about $70 million; Stage 6 Films was left as the sole Sony distributor as of the release of the film. Apple TV+ released the film digitally on July 10, 2020.

Apple said that the film had the biggest debut weekend of any program in the platform's history. Deadline Hollywood said that the figures were "commensurate with a summer theatrical box office big hit". In November, Variety reported the film was the 24th-most watched straight-to-streaming title of 2020 up to that point.

== Reception ==
On review aggregator Rotten Tomatoes, the film holds an approval rating of 79% based on 228 reviews, with an average rating of 6.5/10. The website's critics consensus reads: "Greyhound's characters aren't as robust as its action sequences, but this fast-paced World War II thriller benefits from its efficiently economical approach." On Metacritic, the film has a weighted average score of 64 out of 100, based on 37 critics.

Owen Gleiberman, in his review for Variety, said the film is "less a drama than a tense and sturdy diary of the logistics of battle" and "though much of the action is set in the open air of the ship's command perch, Greyhound often feels like a submarine thriller: tense, tight, boxed-in". Writing for the Chicago Tribune, Michael Phillips gave the film three out of four and said: "Like the canine, [Greyhound is] trim, narrow of scope, and it runs efficiently and well despite a barrage of on-screen time stamps and vessel identification markers".

David Ehrlich of IndieWire gave the film a "C−" and wrote: "A terse and streamlined dad movie that's shorter than a Sunday afternoon nap and just as exciting, Greyhound bobs across the screen like a nuanced character study that's been entombed in a 2,000-ton iron casket and set adrift over the Atlantic. The film offers a handful of brief hints at the tortured hero who Forester invented for his book ... but the whole thing is far too preoccupied with staying afloat to profile the guy at the helm in any meaningful way."

== Accolades ==
Award	Date of ceremony	Category	Recipient(s)	Result	Ref.
Academy Awards	April 25, 2021	Best Sound	Warren Shaw, Michael Minkler, Beau Borders and David Wyman	Nominated	
British Academy Film Awards	April 11, 2021	Best Special Visual Effects	Pete Bebb, Nathan McGuinness and Sebastian von Overheidt	Nominated	
British Academy Film Awards	April 11, 2021	Best Sound	Beau Borders, Christian P. Minkler, Michael Minkler, Warren Shaw and David Wyman	Nominated	
Cinema Audio Society Awards	April 17, 2021	Outstanding Achievement in Sound Mixing for a Motion Picture – Live Action	David Wyman, Michael Minkler, Christian Minkler, Richard Kitting, Beau Borders, Greg Hayes and George A. Lara	Nominated	
Critics' Choice Movie Awards	March 7, 2021	Best Visual Effects	Greyhound	Nominated	
Critics' Choice Super Awards	January 10, 2021	Best Action Movie	Greyhound	Nominated	
Critics' Choice Super Awards	January 10, 2021	Best Actor in an Action Movie	Tom Hanks	Nominated	
Denver Film Critics Society	January 18, 2021	Best Visual Effects	Greyhound	Nominated	
Golden Reel Awards	April 16, 2021	Outstanding Achievement in Sound Editing – Dialogue and ADR for Feature Film	Michael Minkler, Warren Shaw, Will Digby, Dave McMoyler, Michelle Pazer, David Tichauer and Paul Carden	Nominated	
Golden Reel Awards	April 16, 2021	Outstanding Achievement in Sound Editing – Sound Effects and Foley for Feature Film	Warren Shaw, Michael Minkler, Will Digby, Ann Scibelli, Jon Title, Jeff Sawyer, Richard Kitting, Odin Benitez, Jason King, Luke Gibleon and Marko Costanzo	Won	
People's Choice Awards	November 15, 2020	Favorite Drama Movie	Greyhound	Nominated	
People's Choice Awards	November 15, 2020	Favorite Drama Movie Star	Tom Hanks	Nominated	
People's Choice Awards	November 15, 2020	Favorite Male Movie Star	Tom Hanks	Nominated	
San Diego Film Critics Society Awards	January 11, 2021	Best Visual Effects	Greyhound	Nominated	
Satellite Awards	February 15, 2021	Best Visual Effects	Nathan McGuinness and Pete Bebb	Nominated	
Seattle Film Critics Society	February 15, 2021	Best Visual Effects	Pete Bebb, Nathan McGuinness, Whitney Richman and Sebastian Theo von Overheidt	Nominated	
St. Louis Film Critics Association	January 17, 2021	Best Action Film	Greyhound	Nominated	
Visual Effects Society Awards	April 6, 2021	Outstanding Effects Simulations in a Photoreal Feature	Omar Meradi, Jeremy Poupin, Sylvain Robert and Deak Ferrand	Nominated	
Visual Effects Society Awards	April 6, 2021	Outstanding Compositing in a Photoreal Feature	Chris Gooch, Tiago Santos, Stu Bruzek and Sneha Amin	Nominated	

== Sequel ==
A sequel was in development. As of May 2025, the film was in pre-production and began filming in Sydney, Australia, in early January 2026. Returning will be Tom Hanks, Stephen Graham, Producer Gary Goetzman, Director Aaron Schneider and Cinematographer Shelly Johnson.

In February 2026, it was announced that Greyhound 2 is currently in production in Australia, with Rob Morgan and Elisabeth Shue reprising their roles from the original as Jack Patten was added to the cast. The film is being made with support from Screen NSW’s Made in NSW Fund, with Tom Hanks having written the script. It follows Captain Krause (Hanks) and the Greyhound crew from the beaches of Normandy to the Pacific Ocean as they help turn the tide of the war.
