= USS Kidd (DD-661) =

US Navy Fletcher-class destroyer

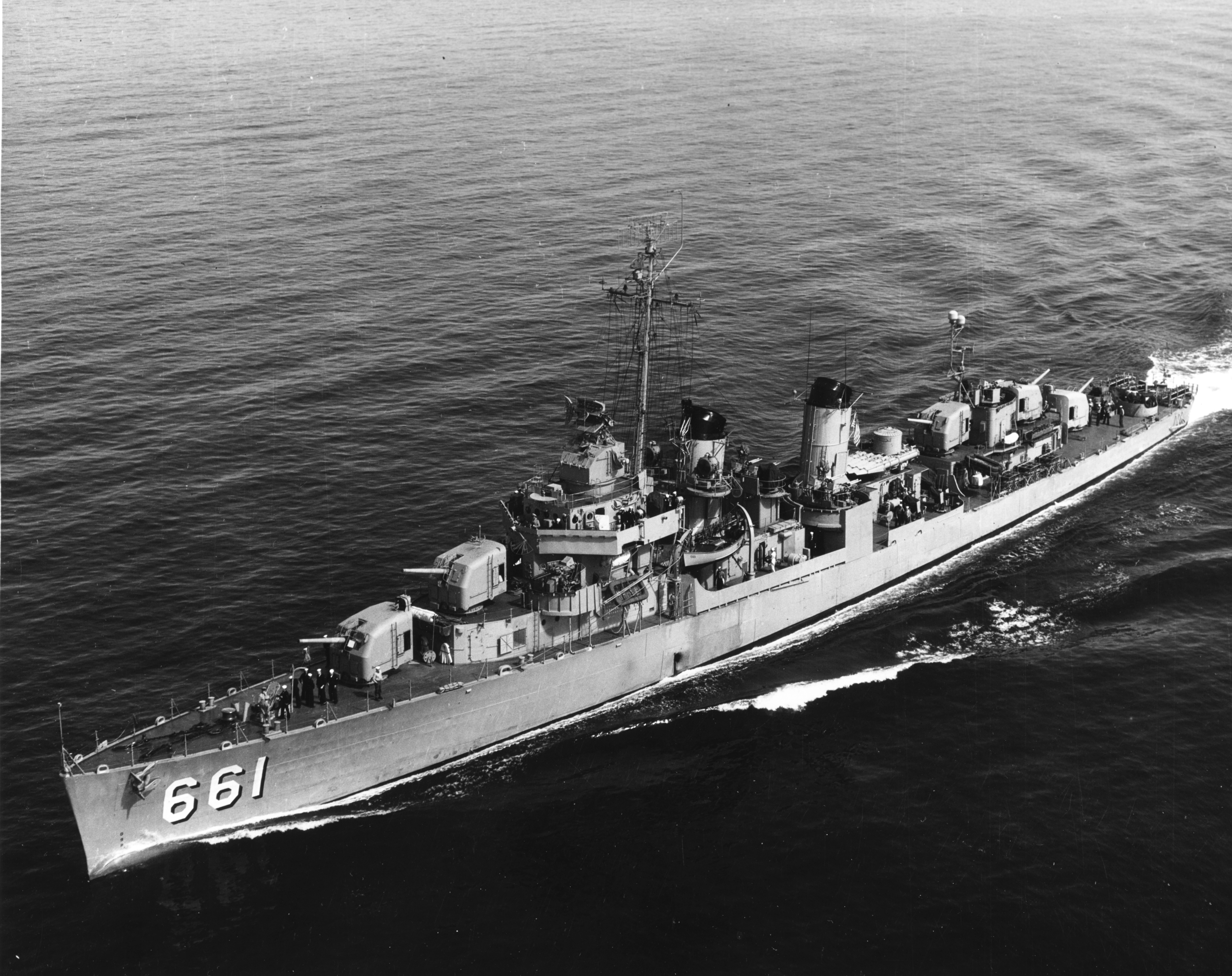
- USS Kidd underway, 1951

History

United States
- Name: Kidd
- Namesake: Isaac C. Kidd
- Builder: Federal Shipbuilding and Drydock Company
- Laid down: 16 October 1942
- Launched: 28 February 1943
- Sponsored by: Mrs. Isaac C. Kidd
- Commissioned: 23 April 1943
- Decommissioned: 10 December 1946
- Recommissioned: 28 March 1951
- Decommissioned: 19 June 1964
- Stricken: 1 December 1974
- Identification: Callsign: NYKF; Hull number: DD-661
- Nickname(s): Pirate of the Atlantic & Pacific
- Honors and awards: See Awards
- Status: Museum ship in Baton Rouge, Louisiana
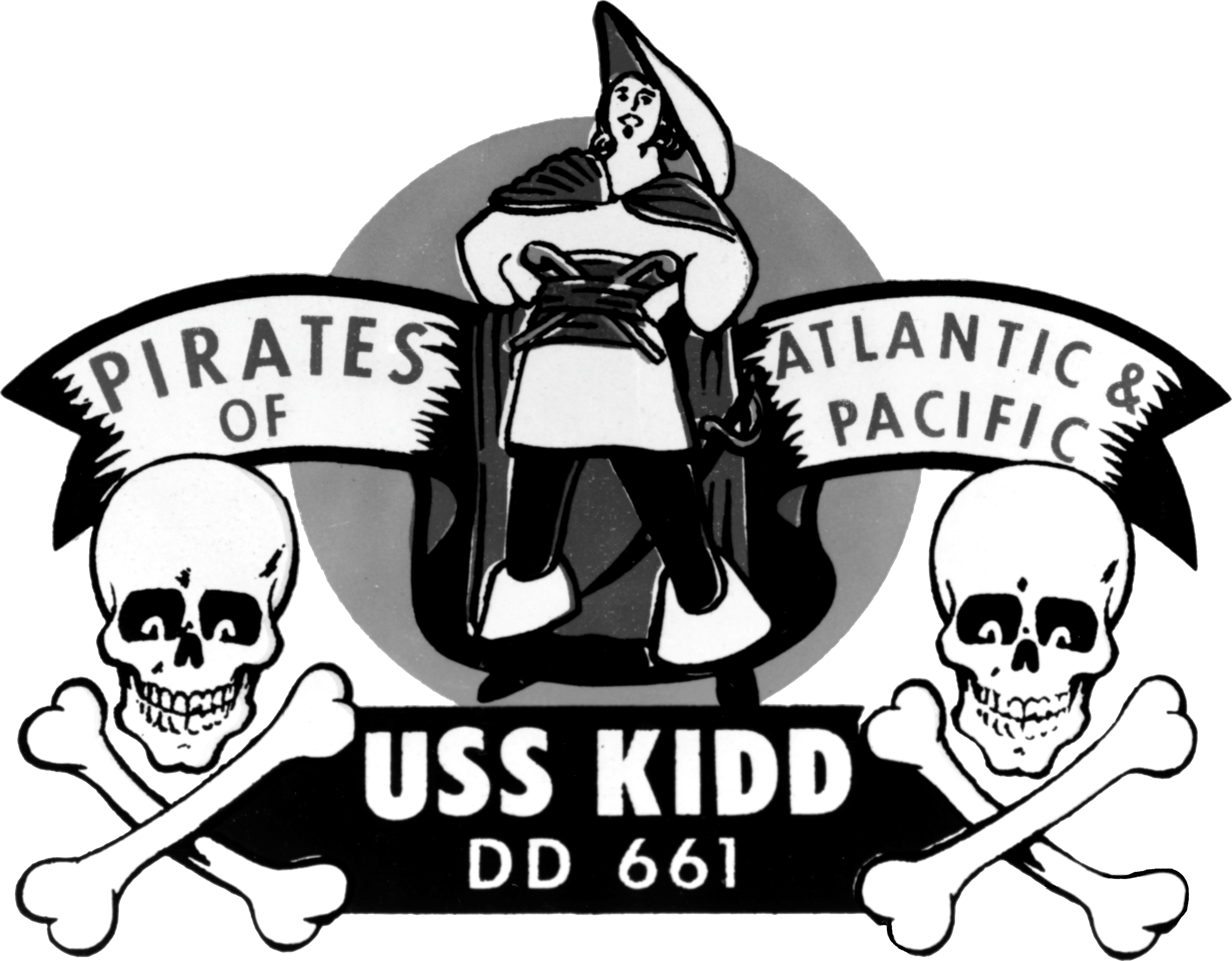
- Badge

General characteristics
- Class & type: Fletcher-class destroyer
- Displacement: 2,050 tons
- Length: 376 ft (115 m)
- Beam: 39 ft 8 in (12.09 m)
- Draft: 17 ft 9 in (5.41 m)
- Propulsion: 4 oil-fired boilers, 2 steam turbines, 2 shafts, 60,000 shp (45,000 kW)
- Speed: 35 knots (65 km/h; 40 mph)
- Range: 6,500 nmi (12,000 km; 7,500 mi) at 15 knots (28 km/h; 17 mph)
- Complement: 329
- Armament: April 1943-December 1944: 5 × 5 in (127 mm)/38 caliber guns; 6 × 40 mm AA guns (3 x 2); 7 × 20 mm AA guns (7 × 1); 10 × 21-inch (533 mm) torpedo tubes (2 × 5); 6 × K-gun depth charge throwers; 2 × depth charge tracks; February–May 1945: 5 × 5 in (127 mm)/38 caliber guns; 10 × 40 mm AA guns (5 x 2); 7 × 20 mm AA guns (7 × 1); 10 × 21-inch (533 mm) torpedo tubes (2 × 5); 6 × K-gun depth charge throwers; 2 × depth charge tracks; Post-August 1945 and as preserved: 5 × 5 in (127 mm)/38 caliber guns; 14 × 40 mm AA guns (3 x 2, 2 x 4); 12 × 20 mm AA guns (6 × 2); 5 × 21-inch (533 mm) torpedo tubes (1 × 5); 6 × K-gun depth charge throwers; 2 × depth charge tracks
- USS Kidd (DD-661)
- U.S. National Register of Historic Places
- U.S. National Historic Landmark
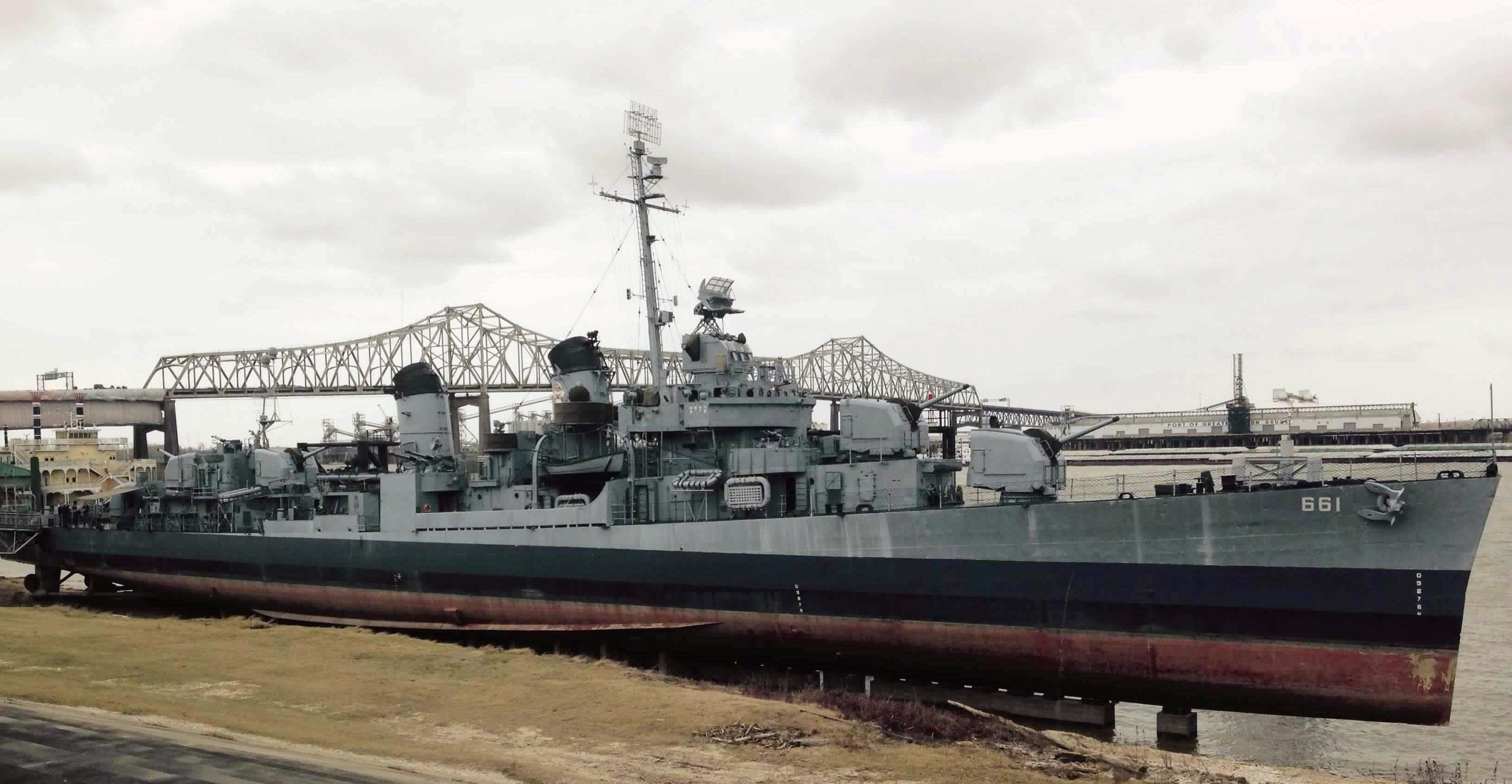
- Kidd serves as part of the Louisiana Veterans Memorial.

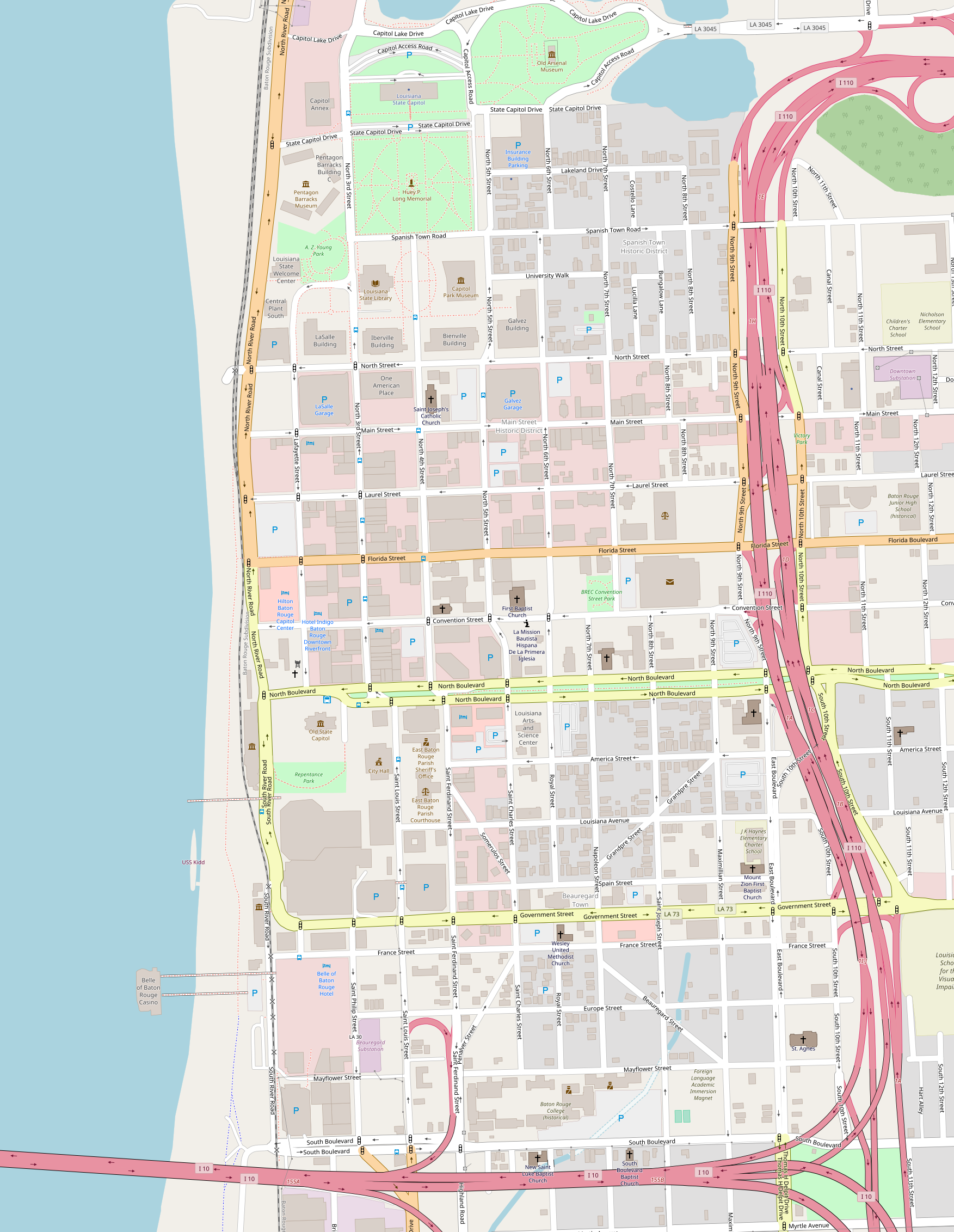
- Location within Baton Rouge Downtown
- Location: 305 South River Road, Baton Rouge, Louisiana
- Coordinates: 30°26′40″N 91°11′29″W
- Built: 1943
- Architect: US Navy
- NRHP reference No.: 83000502

Significant dates
- Added to NRHP: 9 August 1983
- Designated NHL: 14 January 1986

USS Kidd (DD-661), a Fletcher-class destroyer, was the first ship of the United States Navy to be named after Rear Admiral Isaac C. Kidd, who died on the bridge of his flagship USS Arizona during the 1941 Japanese attack on Pearl Harbor. Admiral Kidd was the first US flag officer to die during World War II and the first American admiral ever to be killed in action. A National Historic Landmark, she is now a museum ship, berthed on the Mississippi River in Baton Rouge, Louisiana. Kidd is one of four Fletcher-class destroyers to be preserved, and along with destroyer escort USS Slater (DE 766), one of only two surviving US escort ships preserved in her World War II configuration.

== Service history ==
=== World War II ===
Kidd was launched on 28 February 1943 by Federal Shipbuilding and Drydock Co. at its yard in Kearny, New Jersey, sponsored by Mrs. Isaac C. Kidd, widow of Rear Admiral Kidd. The destroyer was commissioned on 23 April 1943. During her initial cruise to the Brooklyn Navy Yard, she sailed across New York Harbor with the Jolly Roger flying from the foremast. Subsequently, during outfitting, her crew adopted pirate captain William Kidd as their mascot and commissioned a local artist to paint a pirate figure on the forward smokestack. After shakedown out of Casco Bay, Maine, in June, Kidd cruised in the Atlantic Ocean and Caribbean Sea, escorting large combatant vessels until she departed for the Pacific Ocean in August 1943 in company with the battleships Alabama and South Dakota. Arriving at Pearl Harbor, Hawaii, on 17 September 1943, Kidd got underway on 29 September, escorting aircraft carriers toward Wake Island for the heavy air attacks conducted on 6 October on Japanese installations located there, returning to Pearl Harbor on 11 October 1943.

In mid-October, Kidd was underway with a task force to strike Rabaul and support the Bougainville landings. Upon reaching a strike position south of Rabaul on the morning of 11 November, the task force launched attacks upon Japanese positions on the island. Kidd was ordered to rescue the crew of an aircraft from Essex, which had ditched astern of the formation. During this rescue, a group of Japanese aircraft attacked the destroyer; Kidd shot down three attacking aircraft and completed the rescue, while maneuvering to dodge torpedoes and bombs. Cmdr. Roby, her commanding officer, received the Silver Star for gallantry during this action. The destroyer returned to Espiritu Santo on 13 November.

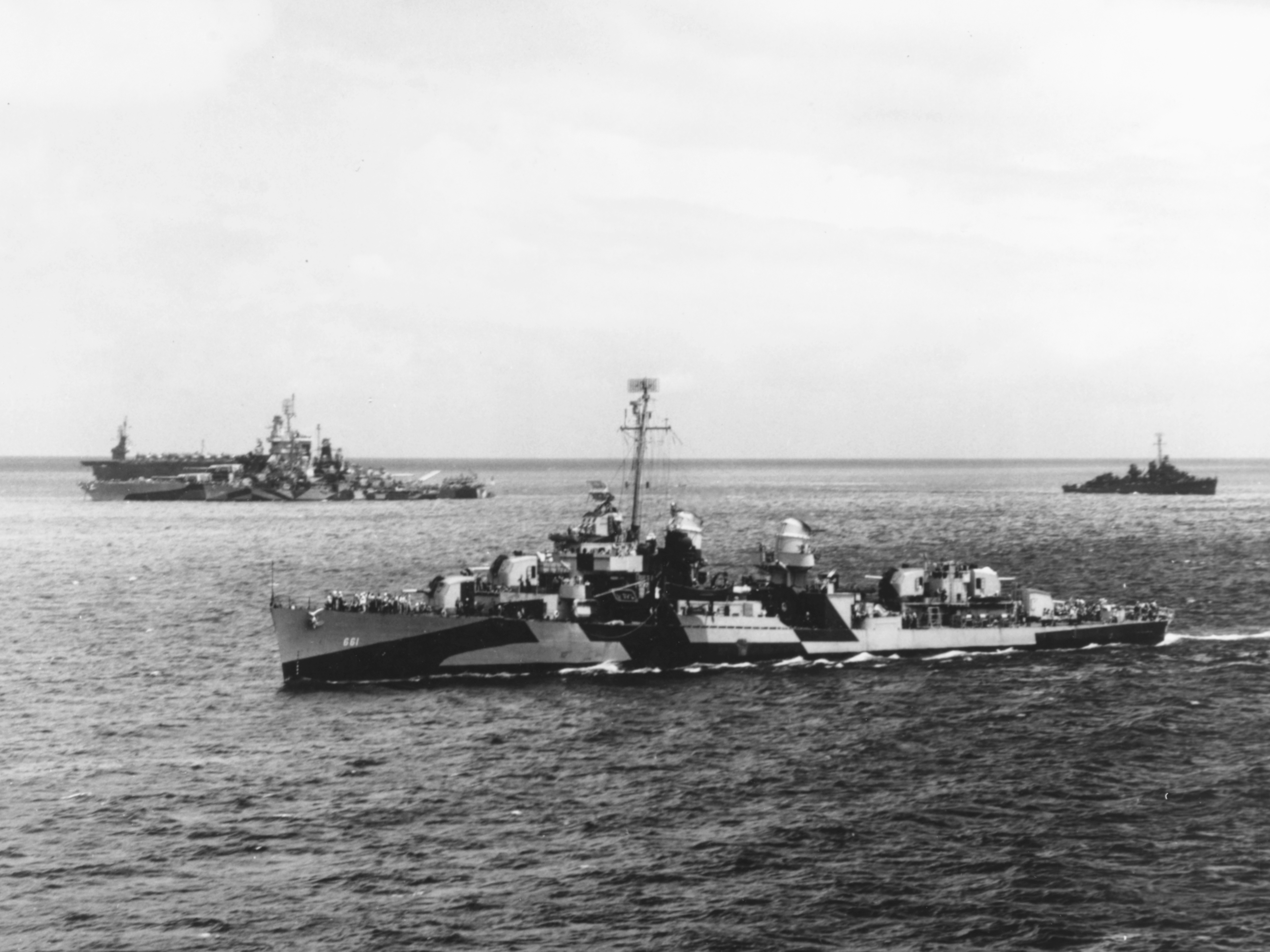
Kidd off Roi Island on 12 June 1944

Kidd next screened carriers making air attacks on Tarawa during the Gilbert Islands invasion from 19 to 23 November. On 24 November, she spotted 15 low-flying, enemy bomber aircraft heading toward the heavy ships, gave warning, and shot down two Aichi D3A "Val" dive bombers. After Tarawa was secure, Kidd remained in the Gilbert Islands to support cleanup operations before returning to Pearl Harbor on 9 December. On 11 January 1944, Kidd sailed for the forward area at Espiritu Santo, then sailed the next day for Funafuti, arriving on 19 January. During the invasion of the Marshall Islands from 29 January to 8 February, Kidd screened heavy ships and bombarded Roi and Wotje, then anchored at Kwajalein on 26 February. From 20 March to 14 April, Kidd guarded an airstrip under construction on Emirau and supported the occupation of Aitape and Hollandia in New Guinea from 16 April to 7 May. She fought in the Marianas campaign from 10 June to 8 July and performed shore bombardment at Guam between 8 July and 10 August.

In need of repairs, Kidd sailed for Pearl Harbor, arriving on 26 August 1944. On 15 September, she departed Pearl Harbor, reached Eniwetok on 26 September, and arrived at Manus on 3 October. There, she became part of the giant Philippines invasion fleet and entered Leyte Gulf on 20 October, where she screened the initial landings and provided fire support for soldiers who fought to reconquer the island until she sailed on 14 November for Humboldt Bay, New Guinea, arriving on 19 November. On 9 December, Kidd headed toward Mare Island Navy Yard for overhaul and moored at Mare Island on Christmas Day.

Kidd sailed 19 February 1945 to join Task Force 58 (TF 58) for the invasion of Okinawa. She played a key role during the first days of the Okinawa campaign, screening battleships, bombarding shore targets, rescuing downed pilots, sinking floating mines, providing early warning of raids, guarding the heavily damaged aircraft carrier Franklin, and helping to shoot down kamikazes. While on picket station on 11 April 1945, Kidd and her division mates, Black, Bullard, and Chauncey, with the help of Combat Air Patrol, repelled three air raids. That afternoon, a single enemy plane crashed into Kidd, killing 38 men and wounding 55. As the destroyer headed south to rejoin the task group, her fire drove off further enemy planes that were trying to finish her off. Stopping at Ulithi for temporary repairs, she got underway on 2 May for the West Coast, arriving at Hunter's Point Naval Shipyard on 25 May. On 1 August 1945, Kidd sailed to Pearl Harbor and returned to San Diego, California, on 24 September 1945 for inactivation. She decommissioned on 10 December 1946 and entered the Pacific Reserve Fleet.

=== Korean War ===
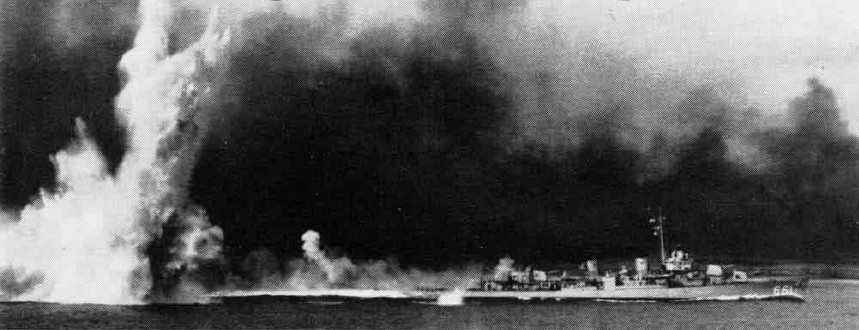
USS Kidd dropping depth charges

When North Korea attacked South Korea, the United States called up a portion of its reserve fleet. Kidd was a part of that call and was recommissioned on 28 March 1951. The destroyer sailed to the Western Pacific on 18 June and arrived at Yokosuka, Japan, on 15 July. She joined Task Force 77 and patrolled off the Korean coast until 21 September, when she sailed for the East Coast of Korea. From 21 October to 22 January 1952, Kidd bombarded targets of opportunity from Wan-Do Island to south of Koesong. She then sailed with Destroyer Division 152 to San Diego, arriving on 6 February 1952.

Kidd again got underway for Korea on 8 September 1952, joined the screen of a hunter-killer group near Kojo, and in November was back on bombardment missions off North Korea. Shortly after that, truce talks began. Kidd continued to patrol the Korean coast during negotiations. She departed the Far East on 3 March 1953 via Midway and Pearl Harbor and arrived in San Diego for overhaul on 20 March. Once the overhaul was completed, Kidd proceeded to Long Beach, California, on 20 April 1953. The next day, the Swedish freighter Hainan collided with Kidd in Long Beach Harbor, requiring repairs that lasted until 11 May 1953.

=== Cold War ===
With the onset of the Cold War, from late 1953 to late 1959, Kidd alternated between West Pacific anti-Soviet submarine patrols with operations on the West Coast, making stops at Pearl Harbor and various ports in Japan, Okinawa, Hong Kong, and the Philippines. She visited Sydney, Australia, on 29 March 1958 and later that year entered the Taiwan Strait.

Kidd got underway on 5 January 1960 for the East Coast via the Panama Canal, arriving at Philadelphia, Pennsylvania, on 25 January. From there, she made Naval Reserve training cruises to various East Coast ports. She joined fleet operating forces during the Berlin Crisis in 1961. December 1961 found Kidd patrolling off the Dominican Republic in a "show of force" patrol to provide an element of security in the troubled Caribbean.

Kidd arrived at Norfolk, Virginia, on 5 February 1962 and joined Task Force Alfa for antisubmarine warfare exercises. On 24 April, she was assigned to the Naval Destroyer School at Naval Station Newport, Rhode Island. After a cruise to the Caribbean, on 1 July 1962, she resumed Naval Reserve training. Kidd was decommissioned on 19 June 1964, entered the Atlantic Reserve Fleet, and was berthed at the Philadelphia Shipyard.

== Preservation ==
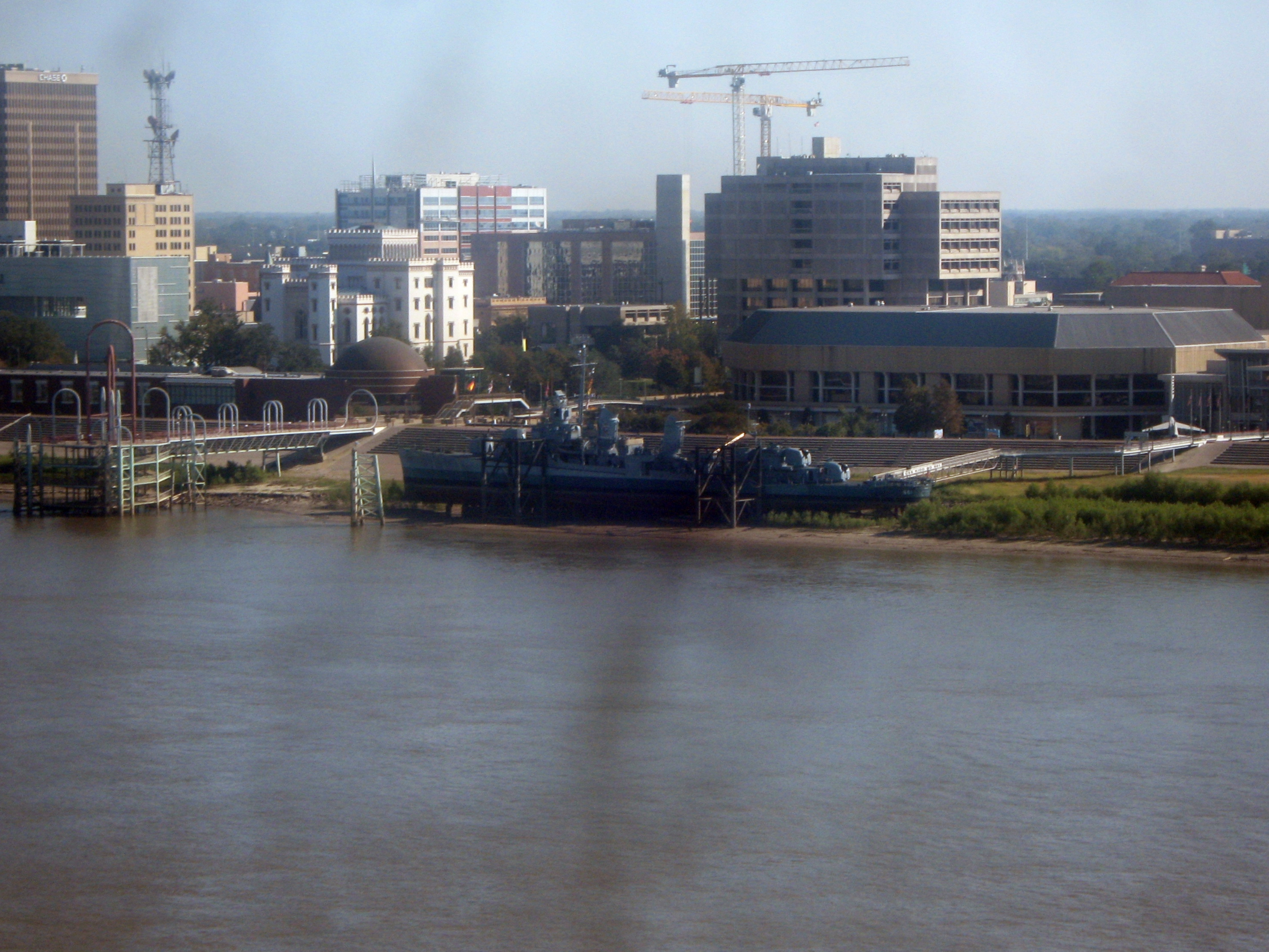
USS Kidd resting in her cradle

The Navy set aside three Fletcher-class ships for use as memorials: The Sullivans, Cassin Young, and Kidd. Louisiana Congressman William Henson Moore selected Kidd to serve as a memorial for Louisiana World War II veterans. The other Fletcher-class museum ships are: The Sullivans in Buffalo, New York; Cassin Young in Boston, Massachusetts; and in Palaio Faliro, Greece, HS Velos, formerly Charrette.

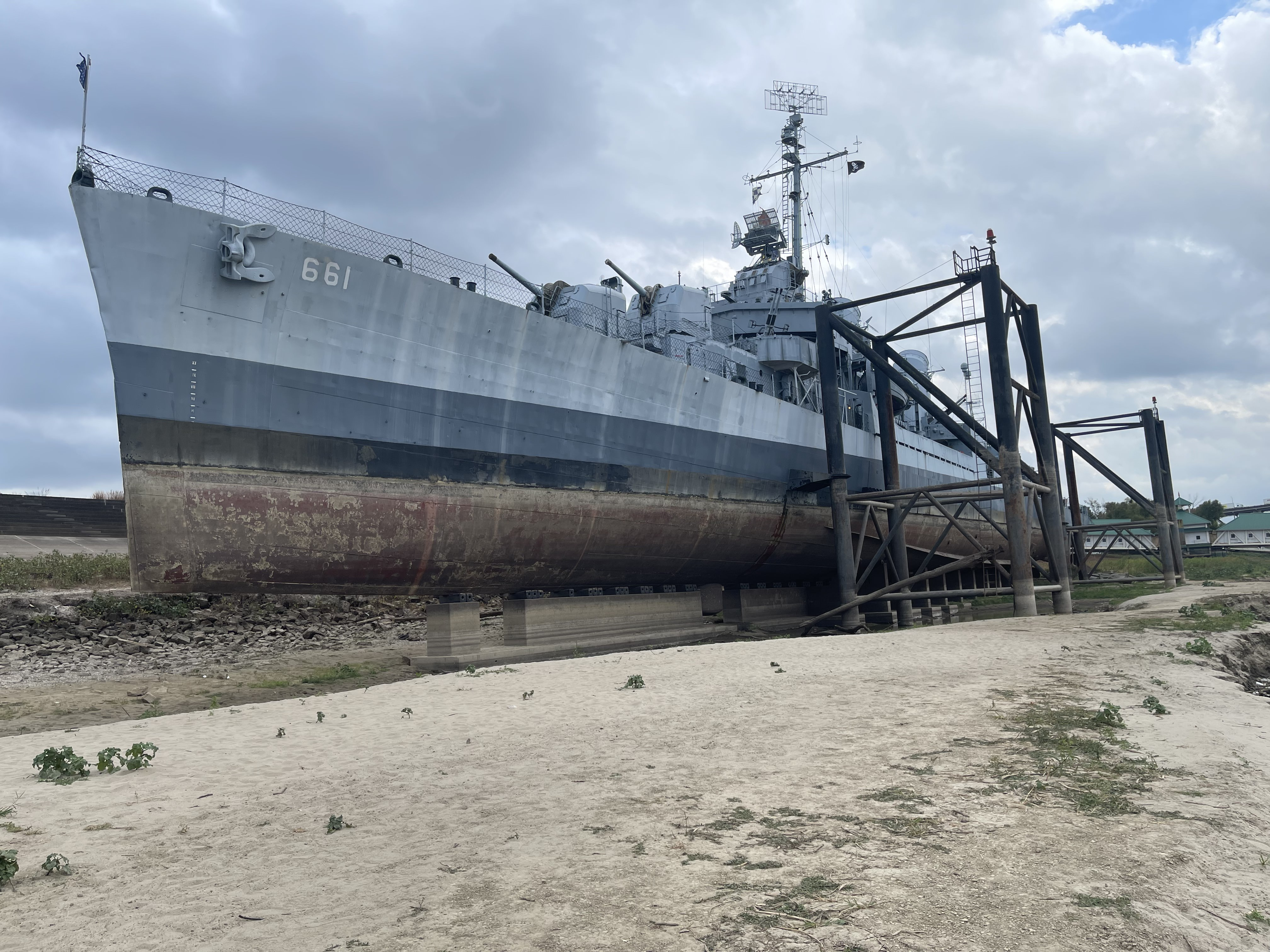
Port side of USS Kidd on dry land

Kidd was towed from Philadelphia and arrived at Baton Rouge on 23 May 1982, where she was transferred to the Louisiana Naval War Memorial Commission. She then went on public view as a museum vessel and hosts youth group overnight encampments. Kidd was never modernized and is the only Fletcher-class museum ship to retain its World War II appearance; she was restored to her August 1945 configuration and armament. Kidd's special mooring in the Mississippi River is designed to cope with the annual change in river depth, which can be up to 40 feet. Half the year, she floats as the river rises; the other half, she sits on keel blocks, and her entire hull can be visible as the water is so low.

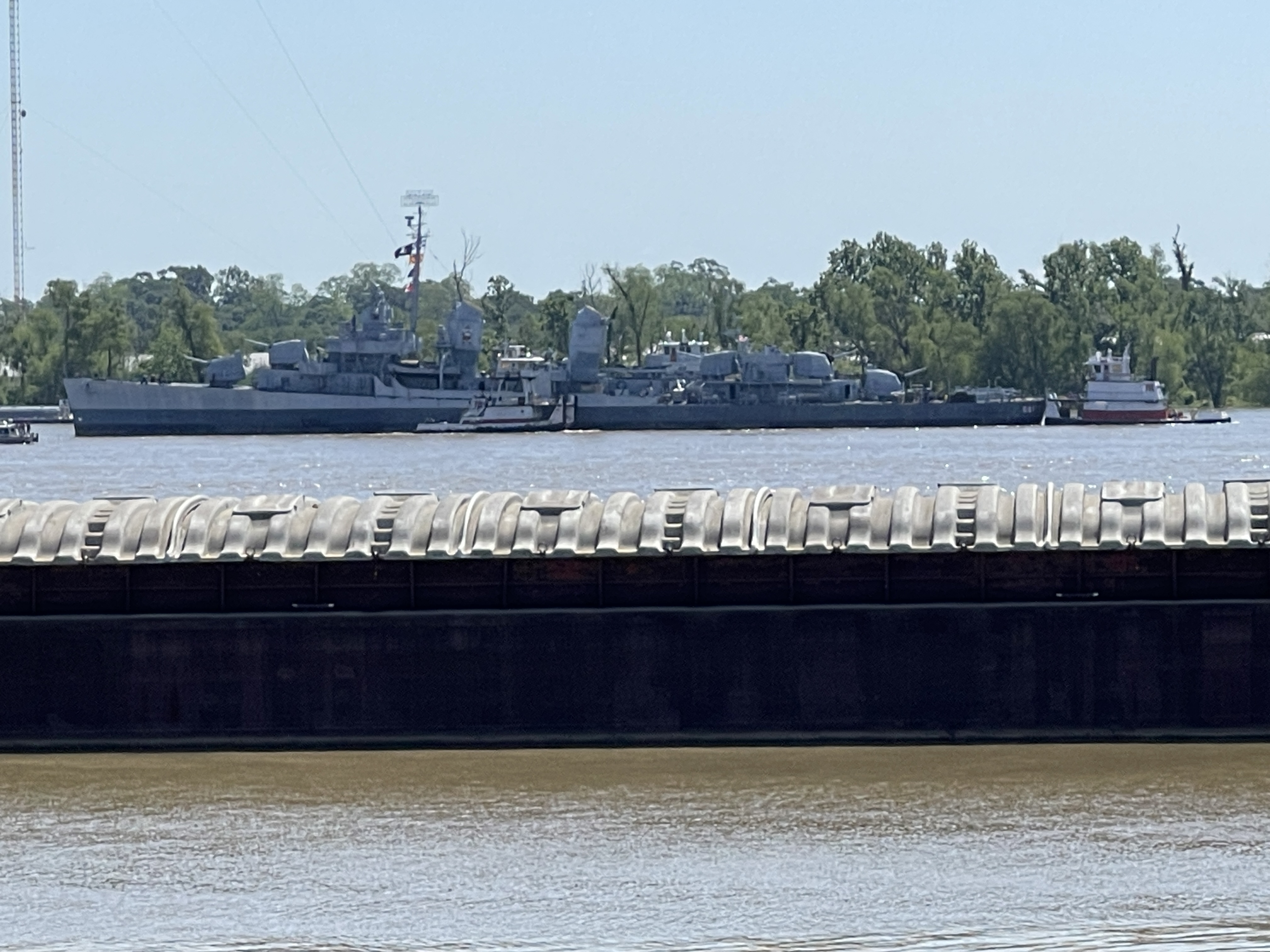
USS Kidd being towed to Houma, Louisiana, for restoration, April 2024

In February 2020, the museum announced plans to take Kidd to drydock to deal with four small hull leaks that had appeared in September 2019. The ship had last been drydocked for structural maintenance in Philadelphia in 1962. In 2023, the Louisiana legislature approved approximately $10 million to fund the drydocking, based on an economic-impact survey showing that the museum contributes significantly to the local and state economy through its impact on tourism. In 2025, the legislature approved an additional appropriation of about $4 million to complete unanticipated repairs of issues that were discoverable only after blasting of the hull had taken place.

On 25 April 2024, Kidd was removed from her mooring cradle and moved to a berthing a mile downstream for Coast Guard inspection. On 29 April, she began a three-day journey down the Mississippi River, through the Gulf of Mexico, and up the Houma Navigational Canal to Thoma-Sea Marine Constructors in Houma, Louisiana. She entered drydock on 13 August 2024. Work included measures to preserve her hull and superstructure. The ship's rudder, which had been modified and enlarged by the U.S. Navy in 1951 to overcome a design flaw affecting her turning radius, was backfit to its original size while in drydock. Along with repairs and preservation work on the ship's hull and structural framework, the museum took the opportunity afforded by the shipyard visit to backfit two areas of the ship's interior, removing Cold War-era modifications and equipment. This was to allow Kidd to move even closer to an authentic 1945 configuration by being the only destroyer capable of presenting and interpreting the segregated sleeping space for African American and other minority crew members that existed prior to 1948. The ship was repainted in her Measure 32/10D "dazzle" camouflage from 1944 as part of a limited-period rotating educational effort that would see her ultimately return to her 1945 Measure 22 camouflage. Restoration of her cradle mooring system in Baton Rouge was accomplished while she was away. Kidd left drydock on 11 November 2025. She was to remain in the shipyard until the spring of 2026, when the Mississippi River rises high enough to allow her entrance back into her mooring cradle in Baton Rouge.

== Awards ==
In 1986, Kidd was designated a National Historic Landmark, as the best-preserved World War II destroyer of her class.

=== U.S. Navy service awards ===
- Asiatic-Pacific Campaign Medal with eight battle stars
- World War II Victory Medal
- China Service Medal
- National Defense Service Medal with service star
- Korean Service Medal with four battle stars
- Armed Forces Expeditionary Medal
- Philippine Presidential Unit Citation
- Korean Presidential Unit Citation
- Philippine Liberation Medal
- United Nations Korea Medal
- Korean War Service Medal (South Korea)

== In popular culture ==
On September 12–13 of 1957, while serving as part of Destroyer Division 152 based out of San Diego, Kidd was used for the filming of Run Silent Run Deep. She portrayed the Japanese destroyer Akikaze, nicknamed "Bungo Pete" in the movie's fictional storyline.

Kidd briefly appeared in the Louisiana Public Broadcasting scholastic series Enviro-Tacklebox in the October 2001 episode "Non-Native Invasion".

Kidd appears in the History Channel documentary series Battle Stations in a 2001 episode entitled "The Destroyer". She also appeared in the documentary series Modern Marvels in a 2007 episode similarly entitled "The Destroyers".

In November 2011, Kidd's Internal Communications and Plotting doubled for that of USS Missouri during the filming of Battleship. Three of her volunteers appear on screen with Rihanna in the scenes where her character leads fire control during the final battle.

In August 2014, Kidd was used in filming season one, episode two (titled "Carrier") of NCIS: New Orleans. Close-in camera shots were used to hide her World War II configuration. A CGI overlay portrayed her as USS Geronimo, a modern Arleigh Burke-class guided-missile destroyer, for distance shots. Her World War II armament does appear in the background of some mid-distance shots.

In 2018, Kidd was used as a stand-in for the fictional Fletcher-class USS Keeling (codenamed "Greyhound"), from C.S. Forester's novel The Good Shepherd, in its appearance in the book's cinematic adaptation, Greyhound.

In 2022, Kidd and her shoreside museum appeared on the Disney+ series National Treasure: Edge of History.

Kidd has been used in the creation of several video games, including Destroyer Command, World of Warships, and Destroyer: The U-Boat Hunter.

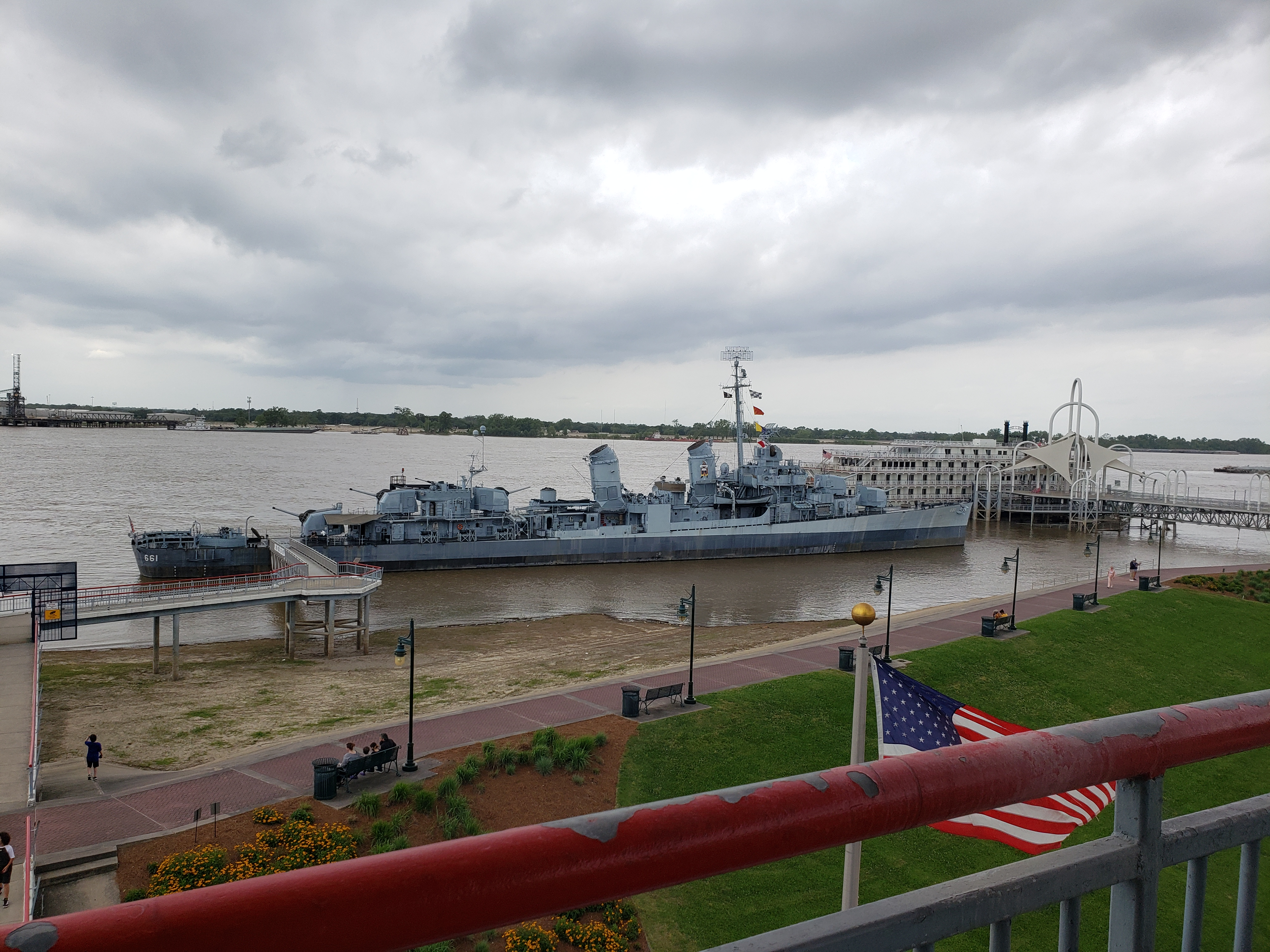
USS Kidd seen from the observation tower of the Louisiana Veterans Museum

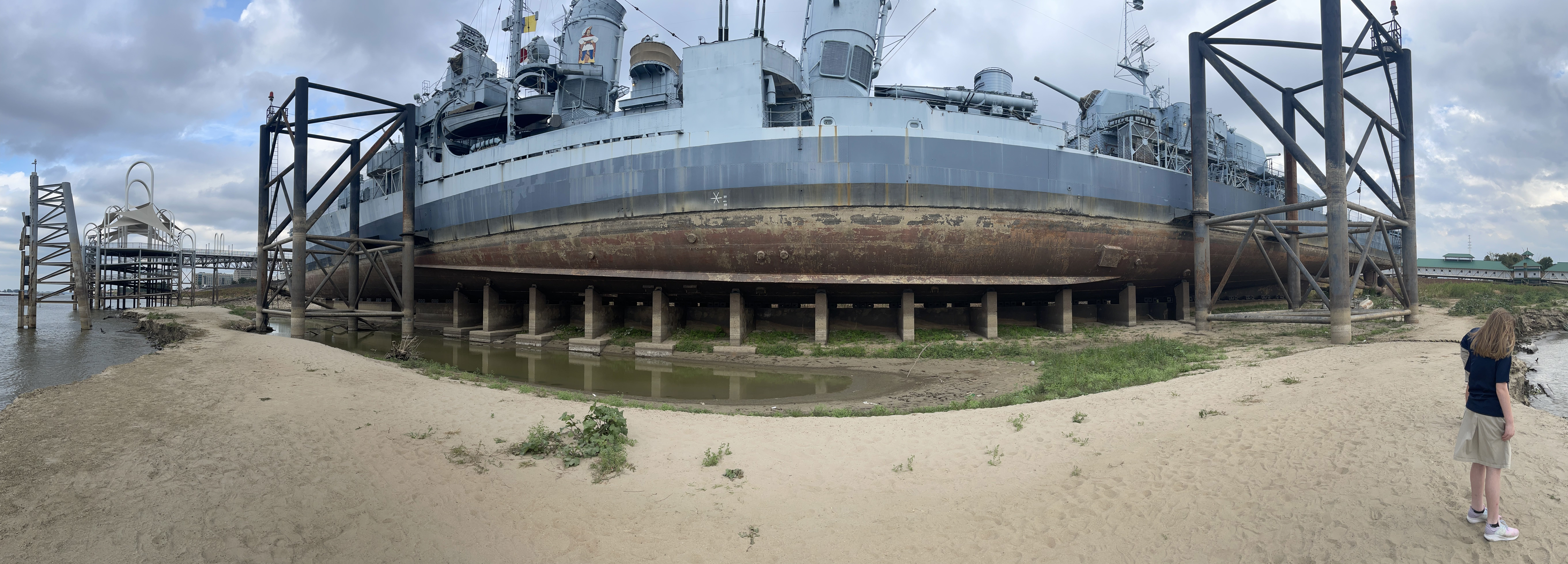
Port side of USS Kidd

== See also ==
- List of National Historic Landmarks in Louisiana
- National Register of Historic Places listings in East Baton Rouge Parish, Louisiana
