= His & Hers (2026 TV series) =

American television series

- Release poster
- Genre: Mystery thriller
- Based on: His & Hers by Alice Feeney
- Developed by: William Oldroyd
- Showrunner: Dee Johnson
- Starring: Tessa Thompson; Jon Bernthal; Pablo Schreiber; Marin Ireland; Sunita Mani; Rebecca Rittenhouse; Chris Bauer; Poppy Liu; Crystal Fox
- Music by: Mac Quayle
- Country of origin: United States
- Original language: English
- No. of episodes: 6

Production
- Executive producers: William Oldroyd; Dee Johnson; Kristen Campo; Kelly Carmichael; Jessica Chastain; Tessa Thompson; Kishori Rajan; Bill Dubuque
- Cinematography: Ante Cheng; Doug Emmett
- Editors: William Henry; Daniel Valverde; Adam Epstein
- Running time: 39–47 minutes
- Production companies: Fifth Season; Small Wishes; Campout Productions; Freckle Films; Viva Maude; Headhunter Films Inc.

Original release
- Network: Netflix
- Release: January 8, 2026

His & Hers is an American mystery thriller limited series starring Tessa Thompson, Jon Bernthal, Pablo Schreiber, Marin Ireland, Sunita Mani, Rebecca Rittenhouse, Chris Bauer, Poppy Liu and Crystal Fox. It is an adaptation of the 2020 novel of the same name by the British author Alice Feeney, and premiered on Netflix on January 8, 2026.

== Premise ==
Following a major tragedy, former news reporter, Anna, finds herself back in her hometown of Dahlonega, the small Georgia town where she grew up, where she seeking an exclusive story following the murder of a former friend and classmate. Drawn by both professional instinct and unresolved ties to her past, Anna returns to Dahlonega and begins digging into the killing, convinced that the truth has been buried beneath layers of silence and half-remembered history. As Anna's investigation deepens, she repeatedly clashes with Detective Jack Harper, her estranged husband who is officially assigned to the case and is deeply suspicious of her motives and involvement.

== Cast ==
=== Main ===
- Tessa Thompson as Anna Andrews, a news reporter for WSK TV News and Jack's estranged wife
  - Kristen Maxwell as teen Anna
- Jon Bernthal as Detective Jack Harper, a detective at Lumpkin County Sheriff's Office in Dahlonega, Georgia, and Anna's estranged husband
- Pablo Schreiber as Richard Jones, Anna's cameraman and Lexy's husband
- Marin Ireland as Zoe Harper, Jack's younger sister who is a single mother
  - Leah Merritt as teen Zoe
- Sunita Mani as Priya "Boston" Patel, a new detective and Jack's new partner at Lumpkin County Sheriff's Office
- Rebecca Rittenhouse as Lexy Jones, a news anchor for WSK TV News
- Crystal Fox as Alice Andrews, Anna's mother
- Chris Bauer as Clyde Duffie, Rachel's husband
- Poppy Liu as Helen Wang, the headmistress of St. Hilary's Girls School
  - Tiffany Ho as teen Helen

=== Recurring ===
- Jamie Tisdale as Rachel Hopkins, a recently murdered woman and Helen's best friend
  - Izzy Kusman as teen Rachel
- Astrid Rotenberry as Catherine Kelly, an overweight teenager whom Rachel, Zoe, and Helen bullied when they were young
- Ellie Rose as Meg Harper, Zoe's daughter
- Mike Pniewski as Jim Pruss, Anna and Lexy's boss at WSK TV News
- Rhoda Griffis as Dr. Carol Turner
- Dave Maldonado as the sheriff of Dahlonega

== Episodes ==
No.	Title	Directed by	Written by	Original release date
1	Episode 1	William Oldroyd	William Oldroyd	January 8, 2026
On a rainy night in the wooded outskirts of Dahlonega, Georgia, the mutilated body of a woman is discovered sprawled across the hood of her car. In Atlanta, former WSK TV News anchor Anna Andrews, who has lived as a recluse for a year following an undisclosed personal tragedy, returns to the station after learning of the homicide in her hometown. Discovering that her anchor position has been permanently claimed by her younger colleague, Lexy Jones, Anna convinces station manager Jim Pruss to assign her as the field correspondent covering the Dahlonega murder, enlisting Lexy's husband, cameraman Richard Jones, to accompany her. In Dahlonega, Detective Jack Harper—Anna's estranged husband who resides with his younger sister, Zoe Harper, and her young daughter, Meg—is assigned to lead the investigation alongside newly transferred Detective Priya "Boston" Patel. At the crime scene, Jack recognizes the victim as Rachel Hopkins, though he conceals his familiarity from Priya. The forensic examination reveals that Rachel was stabbed forty times, her fingernails were pried off and arranged to spell "two-faced," and her body contains traces of semen alongside a lack of defensive wounds, indicating she was intimate with someone shortly before her death. Desperate to conceal his illicit affair with Rachel, Jack instructs his deputies to deliver Rachel's missing mobile phone directly to him and secretly swabs Meg's cheek to submit her DNA in place of his own mandatory police elimination sample. Anna arrives at the crime scene and questions Jack before checking into a local motel, where she initiates a sexual affair with Richard. Later, Anna visits her childhood home to see her mother, Alice Andrews, where Jack informs her that Alice has been exhibiting symptoms of dementia, including an incident in which she was found wandering the streets naked. Searching her teenage bedroom, Anna unearths a handmade friendship bracelet and a camcorder tape from her sixteenth birthday party featuring her adolescent clique—Rachel, Zoe, Helen Wang, and a heavily bullied, overweight outcast named Catherine Kelly. Despite promising Jack that she will withhold Rachel's identity until next of kin are notified, Anna broadcasts Rachel's name live on the evening news. A flashback reveals that on the night of the murder, Jack had sex with Rachel inside his truck in the woods while Anna secretly watched them from the darkness outside.
2	Episode 2	William Oldroyd	Tori Sampson	January 8, 2026
Furious over Anna's broadcast, Jack confronts her at her motel room and orders her not to interfere with his investigation, while Anna privately examines the social media profiles of her high school acquaintances. At the county morgue, Dr. Carol Turner informs Jack and Priya that a woven friendship bracelet was discovered stuffed down Rachel's throat. Seeking to deflect suspicion from himself, Jack directs the investigation toward Rachel's wealthy husband, Clyde Duffie. During questioning, Clyde admits that he and Rachel maintained an open marriage in which Rachel frequently engaged in anonymous trysts inside vehicles to humiliate her partners, provided she kept her affairs outside Dahlonega. Clyde provides home security footage corroborating his alibi on the night of the killing, though he admits to repeatedly calling Rachel's missing phone despite Jack's warning that doing so will drain the battery and prevent a trace. Jack also learns from Clyde that Anna had visited the residence earlier that morning, revealing confidential case details about the forty stab wounds and inquiring whether Rachel had confided in her best friend, Helen Wang, the headmistress of the prestigious St. Hilary's Girls School. Flashbacks depict the social hierarchy at St. Hilary's, showing that teen Anna was only admitted to the academy and reluctantly accepted into Rachel's inner circle because Alice worked as a housekeeper for Rachel's affluent parents. In the present, Anna visits St. Hilary's to question Helen, who remains guarded. Meanwhile, Jack locates Rachel's missing smartphone inside his truck. Unlocking the device, he discovers that Helen was aware of his affair with Rachel and that the two women were orchestrating a blackmail scheme against an unnamed target. Concurrently, forensic technicians note irregularities in the DNA elimination samples submitted by the investigative team.
3	Episode 3	Anja Marquardt	William Oldroyd	January 8, 2026
Expecting to fill in as lead anchor for the evening broadcast in Atlanta, Anna returns to the studio only to be replaced at the last minute by Lexy, intensifying the professional rivalry between the two women. A flashback to their teenage years at St. Hilary's depicts teen Anna encouraging Rachel, Helen, and Zoe to invite Catherine Kelly to their lunch table; however, Rachel humiliates Catherine by tricking her into drinking urine in front of the cafeteria. In the present, Jack inspects the contents of Rachel's phone and finds a video showing Rachel and Helen subjecting Clyde to sadomasochistic humiliation. At dinner, an argument erupts between Jack and Zoe when Zoe confronts him over secretly swabbing Meg's DNA; cornered, Jack confesses that he slept with Rachel in the woods on the night she was murdered, though he maintains she was alive when he left. Meanwhile, Priya submits her and Clyde's DNA samples at the lab, where a technician mentions that Jack had been searching the crime scene for his lost wedding ring—a detail that arouses Priya's suspicions since Jack claimed to be separated. Priya also uncovers call logs showing that immediately after police left his driveway, Clyde phoned both Rachel's device and Helen Wang. Tailing Clyde at night, Priya watches him dump a trash bag in an alley and retrieves it, finding a bondage mask inside. Simultaneously, Jack encounters Richard at a grocery store, noticing the cameraman purchasing bleach, duct tape, zip ties, and a hammer. Wearing plastic bags over his boots to avoid leaving tracks, Jack returns to the forest crime scene and visits the adjacent cemetery, where the groundskeeper shows him security camera footage from the night of the murder. The footage reveals Anna visiting the grave of their infant daughter, Charlotte Alice Harper, whose sudden death from Sudden Infant Death Syndrome (SIDS) while in Alice's care a year earlier precipitated Anna's breakdown and estrangement from Jack. Later that night, after comforting Alice following another wandering episode, Jack is awakened at dawn by Priya: Helen Wang has been murdered inside St. Hilary's with a friendship bracelet forced into her mouth, and the witness who discovered the body and called police is Anna.
4	Episode 4	Anja Marquardt	Dee Johnson	January 8, 2026
At St. Hilary's, Anna reports live on Helen's homicide while Jack and Priya process the scene. Anna states that she went to the school early that morning after receiving a front-desk message that Helen had phoned her motel after midnight requesting an urgent meeting. However, the medical examiner determines that Helen was already dead by midnight, indicating that the killer placed the call to lure Anna to the body. Furthermore, forensic analysis clears Clyde as a DNA match and reveals he is impotent, while Priya's background check on Richard uncovers an arrest three years prior for assault and battery after he broke a woman's jaw. Searching through old storage boxes at home, Jack finds Zoe's matching friendship bracelet and learns from his sister that Anna had woven the bracelets for the group in high school. Capitalizing on the growing panic in Dahlonega, Anna persuades the mayor to host a televised town hall meeting moderated by WSK TV News, compelling the sheriff of Dahlonega to put Jack on stage. During the broadcast, Jack remarks that many homicides remain unsolved, while Anna warns the audience that the perpetrator may be sitting among them. Meanwhile, Priya examines archival school photographs of Anna, Rachel, Helen, and Zoe wearing the identical friendship bracelets, realizing the killer is systematically targeting the teenage clique and investigating the fifth member, Catherine Kelly. After the town hall, Jack confronts Anna in private, revealing he knows she was at Charlotte's grave on the night Rachel died and saw him in the truck. Their confrontation over Charlotte's death and their fractured marriage culminates in the two reconciling in the back of Jack's truck.
5	Episode 5	Anja Marquardt	William Oldroyd and Tori Sampson	January 8, 2026
The morning after his encounter with Anna, Jack attends a briefing where Priya presents her formal theory to the sheriff: the victims are linked to Anna's high school clique at St. Hilary's, and Anna herself is a prime suspect who may be orchestrating the killings to revive her broadcasting career. Jack storms out and confronts Clyde with the sadomasochistic video from Rachel's phone, attempting to force a confession. Clyde admits he despised Rachel and intentionally drained her phone battery to prevent the embarrassing video from surfacing, but reveals that he was not the target of Rachel and Helen's blackmail scheme—pointing out that his name is not the only one beginning with the letter "C". Realizing Jack possesses Rachel's missing phone because he slept with her, Clyde threatens to expose Jack to the sheriff. Investigating Rachel's movements prior to her death, Jack interviews an Atlanta acquaintance who recalls driving Rachel to the upscale Luxe 11 apartment building, from which she emerged with a slapped, reddened face. Discovering that Richard and Lexy reside at Luxe 11, Jack confronts Richard at a local bar. Richard denies knowing Rachel and explains that his prior assault conviction stemmed from defending Lexy against a female stalker, before provoking Jack with a crude remark about Anna. The two men brawl, prompting the sheriff to suspend Jack from the investigation, while Anna blackmails Richard into dropping assault charges by threatening to tell Lexy about their affair. At the station, Priya interviews Zoe regarding Catherine Kelly and uncovers an obituary for Catherine's younger sister, Andrea Kelly, alongside phone records showing that sixty percent of Rachel's calls were divided among Clyde, Helen, and Jack. That evening, Anna and Richard discover that someone claiming to be from WSK TV News canceled their motel reservations, prompting Richard to take Anna to his in-laws' isolated lake house. En route, a flashback to Anna's sixteenth birthday reveals that Rachel, Helen, and Zoe lured Anna and Catherine to forest ruins where Rachel had secretly accepted cash from older men in exchange for allowing them to sexually assault Catherine. Simultaneously, Jack returns home to find Zoe murdered in the bathtub, while Anna inspects family photographs on the lake house wall showing a young Catherine Kelly transforming after drastic weight loss into Lexy Jones.
6	Episode 6	William Oldroyd	Bill Dubuque	January 8, 2026
A flashback to Catherine Kelly's youth reveals that after her younger sister, Andrea, mocked her weight before a family boat trip, Catherine intentionally emptied Andrea's asthma inhaler, causing Andrea to fatally suffocate on the water. In the present, Anna calls a grieving Jack from the lake house and shares her location, warning him that Lexy is actually Catherine Kelly. Overhearing Anna accuse him and his wife of being serial killers, an enraged Richard confiscates Anna's phone, forcing Anna to lock him outside and retrieve a firearm. Meanwhile, Priya intercepts Jack at gunpoint, having pieced together his affair with Rachel, his missing wedding ring, and his falsified DNA sample; desperate to save Anna, Jack knocks Priya unconscious and speeds toward the lake house. At the lake house, Anna fires at Richard and misses, exhausting her ammunition just as Lexy arrives. Dropping all pretense, Lexy confronts Anna, blaming her for repeatedly drawing her into the orbit of Rachel's clique and believing Anna was complicit in the sixteenth-birthday ambush in the woods. A physical struggle ensues until Lexy seizes a weapon and prepares to kill Anna; just as Jack breaches the doorway, a recovered Priya shoots Lexy dead through the window. In the aftermath, police search the lake house and uncover Rachel's pried-off fingernails and the murder weapon, while the sheriff notes that Rachel and Helen had been blackmailing Lexy over Andrea's death—closing the case with Lexy identified as the sole serial killer and Richard arrested as an accomplice. Outside, a shaken Anna confides in Jack about the sixteenth-birthday attack she had repressed for years. One year later, Jack and a visibly pregnant Anna have reconciled, relocated to a new home in Atlanta where Anna has resumed her anchor position, and adopted Meg following Zoe's death. While visiting Alice—who is now tended by a full-time caregiver—Anna discovers a handwritten letter from her mother inside her childhood bedroom that reveals Alice as the true perpetrator of the murders. Following baby Charlotte's crib death and Anna's year-long absence, a grief-stricken Alice had watched Anna's old high school VHS tapes and viewed the complete, unedited footage of Anna's sixteenth birthday: when Anna intervened to help Catherine escape the older men hired by Rachel, the assailants turned on Anna instead, violently raping her while Rachel, Helen, and Zoe watched, laughed, and sang "Happy Birthday". Consumed by maternal fury and having also witnessed Jack and Rachel's affair near Charlotte's grave, Alice engineered a plot to avenge her daughter and rebuild Anna's shattered family. Exploiting her invisibility as an elderly former housekeeper, Alice deliberately feigned dementia—including wandering the streets naked immediately after slashing Rachel's tire and stabbing her forty times on the anniversary of Charlotte's death—to establish an alibi. Using duplicate keys retained from her years as a domestic worker, Alice entered St. Hilary's and Zoe's residence to murder Helen and Zoe, calculating that killing Rachel would bring Anna back to Dahlonega, killing Helen would keep her there to reconnect with Jack, and killing Zoe would ensure that Anna and Jack adopted Meg to replace the daughter they lost. Having recognized Lexy on television as Catherine Kelly, Alice canceled Anna's motel reservation and planted the fingernails and murder weapon at the lake house to frame Catherine for the crimes, never anticipating that Priya would fatally shoot her. Realizing her new life and restored family are built upon her mother's murders, Anna conceals the letter and shares a silent, knowing smile with Alice, choosing to keep the secret.

== Production ==
=== Development ===
In 2020, Jessica Chastain, Kristen Campo, and Endeavor Content acquired the television rights to the Alice Feeney novel His & Hers. It was later reported to be a Netflix project. Dee Johnson would serve as showrunner, while Bill Dubuque and William Oldroyd would write and executive produce, with Oldroyd directing the first episode. Chastain and Campo would serve as executive producers, with Fifth Season as the studio. Additionally, reports suggested a production budget of approximately $35 to $50 million for the entire six-episode run.

Most of the series is set in Dahlonega, Georgia, an historic town about an hour north of Atlanta at the foothills of the Blue Ridge Mountains. Filming took place on location in Dahlonega and other locations around Atlanta and North Georgia.

=== Casting ===
The cast is led by Tessa Thompson who also has an executive producer credit. In September 2024, Jon Bernthal, Pablo Schreiber, Rebecca Rittenhouse, Sunita Mani, Crystal Fox, Marin Ireland, Poppy Liu and Chris Bauer joined the cast. The following month Rhoda Griffis and Jamie Tisdale were among ten additions to the recurring cast.

Principal photography took place in Atlanta, Georgia from September 24, 2024, with a schedule to film into December.

Hylton Casting handled the background casting duties for the production.

== Release ==
The series premiered on Netflix on January 8, 2026.

== Reception ==
On the review aggregator website Rotten Tomatoes, 68 percent of 50 critics' reviews are positive. The website's critics consensus reads, "A moody mystery whose questions are more interesting than its answers, His & Hers gets most of its rooting interest from Jon Bernthal and Tessa Thompson's riveting performances." On Metacritic, it has a weighted average score of 53 out of 100 based on 20 critics, indicating "mixed or average" reviews.

His & Hers won Outstanding TV Movie or Limited Series, and Tessa Thompson won Outstanding Lead Performance in a TV Movie or Limited Series, at the 2026 Black Reel TV Awards.
