= Robin Hood (2025 TV series) =

American television series

- Genre: Action-adventure; Historical drama
- Created by: Jonathan English & John Glenn
- Starring: Jack Patten; Lauren McQueen; Lydia Peckham; Marcus Fraser; Henry Rowley; Erica Ford; Angus Castle-Doughty; Steven Waddington; Connie Nielsen; Sean Bean
- Music by: Federico Jusid
- Country of origin: United States
- Original language: English
- No. of seasons: 1
- No. of episodes: 10

Production
- Executive producers: Todd Lieberman; Jonathan English; John Glenn
- Production location: Serbia
- Editors: Bojan Kosović; Ana Žugić
- Running time: 51–65 minutes
- Production companies: English Glenn Media; Hidden Pictures; Lionsgate Television

Original release
- Network: MGM+
- Release: November 2, 2025 – present

Robin Hood is an American action-adventure television series created by Jonathan English and John Glenn, and produced by Lionsgate Television. It stars Jack Patten and Lauren McQueen in the lead roles of Robin Hood and Marian respectively, along with Sean Bean as the Sheriff of Nottingham. The series premiered on November 2, 2025, on MGM+. In February 2026, the series was renewed for a second season.

== Premise ==
A Saxon forester's son, Rob, and the daughter of a Norman earl, Marian, fight for justice and freedom following the Norman Conquest of England in the Middle Ages. Rob becomes the leader of a band of rebel outlaws while Marian infiltrates the Norman courts. They collaborate to thwart royal corruption and bring peace to England while being hunted by the Sheriff of Nottingham.

== Cast and characters ==
=== Main ===
- Jack Patten as Robert "Rob" Locksley / Robin Hood
  - Albert Rice portrays young Robin Hood
- Lauren McQueen as Marian of Huntingdon / Maid Marian
  - Billie Gadsdon portrays young Marian
- Lydia Peckham as Priscilla of Nottingham
  - Kiara Kalina Jordan portrays young Priscilla
- Marcus Fraser as John Nailer / Little John
- Henry Rowley as Will Gamewell
- Erica Ford as Rosemary "Ralph" Miller
- Angus Castle-Doughty as Friar Tuck
- Steven Waddington as the Earl of Huntingdon (season 1)
- Connie Nielsen as Queen Eleanor of Aquitaine
- Sean Bean as the Sheriff of Nottingham
- Graeme Thomas King as Prince John (season 2; recurring season 1)
- James Purefoy as King Henry (season 2)
- Colin O'Donoghue as Prince Richard (season 2)
- Luke Roberts as Amaury D'Montfort (season 2)

=== Recurring ===
- Tom Mison as Hugh Locksley
- Richard Lintern as the Bishop of Hereford
- Ryan Gage as Spragart
- Ian Pirie as Uncle Gamewell
- Klemen Novak as Gerold
- Miloš Cvetković as Bernard
- Jake Curran as Alwin
- Billy Rilot as Aronne of Huntingdon
- Freddie Hastwel as Aleppo of Huntingdon
- Jelena Gavrilović as Godda
- Tiana Upcheva as Isabel
- Miloš Timotijević as Egbert
- Nikola Jankovic as Warin
- James Farley as Milange
- Tamara Radovanović as Celene De Fitzou
- Matija Gredić as Drew Miller
- Mihailo Lazić as Henry Miller
- Oscar Salem as William Marshal, 1st Earl of Pembroke
- Daniel O'Meara as Lord Warwick
- Paul Leonard Murray as the High Steward of London

=== Guest ===
- Anastasia Griffith as Joan Locksley
- Chris Jenks as Lefors
- Marjan Tasić as Aedric
- Milena Predić as Matilda Gamewell
- Arsenije Beric as Falke
- Bojana Smiljanic as Hilda
- Sam Bell as Mary
- Kim Fenton as the Earl of Leicester
- Emma Gojkovic as the Baroness of York
- Igor Skvarica as Ibrahim Al-Rashid
- Boban Marjanović as Drogo
- Davor Tomic as Guy of Gisbourne

== Episodes ==
No.	Title	Directed by	Written by	Original release date
1	"I See Him"	Jonathan English	Jonathan English & John Glenn	November 2, 2025
Hugh Locksley, a proud Saxon, tells his young son Robert "Rob" Locksley about the legend of Aedric, who led the first Saxon foresters into Sherwood Forest to defy the laws that were imposed on them following the Norman Conquest. Hoping to reclaim his estate after the Normans seized it, Hugh petitions the Sheriff of Nottingham but is instead forced to serve as Nottingham's royal forester, deepening his resentment. Rob visits the Locksley estate and meets Marian, the kind-hearted daughter of the estate's new occupant, Huntingdon. Many years later, Rob has become a skilled archer and joins his father on a hunt. He discovers a pair of poachers whom the Sheriff quickly arrests. Huntingdon later frames Hugh for treason by forcing the forester Alwin to testify against him. The Sheriff's daughter, Priscilla, defies her father by having a secret affair with Lefors, Nottingham's guard captain. Rob invites Marian to attend a Saxon wedding, and they soon fall in love. Following Hugh's imprisonment, one of the poachers is paid by Huntingdon to kill him, but accidentally kills an intervening guard. Hugh is accused of the murder and sentenced to death, and Rob arrives in time to witness his father's execution.
2	"A Heinous Devil"	Jonathan English	Jonathan English & John Glenn	November 2, 2025
Rob mourns his father and delivers the news to his mother, Joan. Her health soon deteriorates, and she dies, leaving Rob to live with his uncle Gamewell and cousin Will. Now that Hugh could no longer reclaim his land, Huntingdon bribes both the Sheriff and the Bishop of Hereford to obtain the deed to the Locksley estate and becomes an earl. Marian learns that her father's actions caused Hugh's death, and is told to depart Nottingham to attend the court of Queen Eleanor in London. Rob and Will routinely argue, leading to Rob being kicked out of the house after a fight between them ends with Gamewell being injured. Will then heads to London before Rob can reconcile with him. Rob then attempts to convince Marian to elope with him, but is discovered by Huntington and manages to escape. Marian later secretly meets with Rob to confess that her father was behind Hugh's death, and Rob breaks his bow in frustration. Gamewell gifts Rob a new bow and suggests he participate in an archery competition, with the reward being a royal appointment. While en route to the competition, Rob is antagonized by Lefors, whom Rob kills in self-defence and flees.
3	"No Man Can Hide Forever"	Jonathan English	Jonathan English & John Glenn	November 9, 2025
Lefors' corpse is returned to Nottingham, leaving Priscilla distraught at the news, who blames herself for being aware of Marian and Rob's relationship. The Sheriff puts a bounty on Rob's head and leads a garrison of soldiers alongside Huntingdon to hunt Rob down. In London, Marian is taught about her new role as the queen's servant by the lady-in-waiting Celene De Fitzou, and discovers that Will has also become a royal servant. She soon meets Eleanor, who informs Marian that she was requested specifically. Rob meets the outcast girl Ralph Miller, who poses as a boy, and her two younger brothers, Drew and Henry. He agrees to teach Ralph archery, but they are discovered by John Nailer, who was seeking Rob's bounty. John captures Rob but has a vision of the forest goddess Godda, and decides to help Rob instead. Huntingdon's youngest son, Aronne, sets off on his own and finds Rob's camp. He shoots John's dog and attacks Ralph's brothers, but he is killed by Ralph. Huntingdon and his remaining son, Aleppo, arrive to witness Aronne's death before Rob, John, and the Miller siblings flee into the forest.
4	"The Cause of This Unrest"	Orsi Nagypal	Jonathan English & John Glenn	November 16, 2025
The Sheriff makes plans to hire more soldiers using Nottingham's taxes and tells the Bishop to take Priscilla to a convent to atone for her affair. Priscilla attends Aronne's funeral and convinces Huntingdon to let her stay with him, but later escapes on her own. She then returns home, angering her father for not following his demands. Marian struggles to adjust to her life in London and prays for Rob's safety. Eleanor meets with William Marshal, a close advisor to King Henry, and tells him of her plan to groom Marian to become her spy in Nottingham. John suggests to the group that they steal food from travelers, while Ralph feels guilty for killing Aronne. They loot a wagon from the Hereford abbey but spare its passenger, Friar Tuck, who agrees to follow them to avoid being punished by the Bishop. The group soon allows the poacher Spragart and his wife Mary to join them, and Tuck persuades the rest to steal the Bishop's taxes. They later attack the Bishop's carriage, but Mary is killed and Henry is wounded. Rob spares the Bishop, who warns the Sheriff that the leader of the men who attacked him was named Robin Hood.
5	"Go Back to Them"	Jonathan English	Jonathan English & John Glenn	November 23, 2025
Priscilla has nightmares of Robin Hood burning Nottingham to the ground and confides in the recovering Bishop. The Sheriff receives aid from the Earl of Leicester and Lord Warwick, who together scour the forests for the Bishop's attackers. Eleanor sends Marshal to Nottingham to ensure the Sheriff's loyalty. Marian is informed of Aronne's death, and Will explains that Nottingham's position as the stronghold of the Midlands means that Eleanor needs influence there so she can seize the throne from her ailing husband. To avoid capture, Rob buries the stolen taxes, and his group splits up. Rob then ventures to the heart of the forest, where a vision of his father tells him that his true purpose is to become an outlaw feared by the Normans. The Miller siblings return home but are soon discovered by Warwick, who burns down their village and takes them captive to be executed by the Sheriff. Rob recruits his friend Isabel and reunites with Tuck, John, and Spragart, who interrupt the execution and rescue the Millers. During their escape, John sets several buildings on fire and recruits Priscilla's disgraced servant Milange to their cause. Rob attempts to assassinate the Sheriff, but instead injures Priscilla.
6	"Bound by Love, Divided by Lies"	Debs Paterson	Jonathan English & John Glenn	November 30, 2025
Eleanor arrives in Nottingham and sends Marian to secure a meeting with Robin Hood. Rob reunites with Marian, but fails to disclose Hood's true identity. Rob's band of outlaws grows substantially, with the heart of the forest as their hideout. The Sheriff hosts a banquet where Eleanor requests that he sign a writ of loyalty so she can summon King Henry to aid him. Fearful of the propaganda surrounding Hood, the Sheriff's allies all sign, but he refuses, wanting to deal with Hood himself. Marian tells Eleanor of her success, and she agrees to grant Rob clemency for killing Lefors. Marian and Rob later sleep together, and Marian makes him promise to leave Nottingham. The Sheriff learns of Hood's identity due to his arrows matching Hugh's craftsmanship. Rob attends the meeting with Eleanor, who requests that he enter open rebellion to distract the King so she can put her eldest son Prince Richard on the throne. Rob agrees on the condition that Marian will be freed of Eleanor's service. The Sheriff later destroys the writ, and Eleanor threatens him with execution if he fails to stop Hood. A belligerent Huntingdon informs Marian that Rob is responsible for Aronne's death.
7	"Thieves with a Purpose"	Orsi Nagypal	Kenny Ryan & Jacob Roman	December 7, 2025
Marian confronts Rob about Aronne's death, which makes her realize Robin Hood's identity, and ends their relationship. A heartbroken Marian is later rescued from bandits by Prince John, Eleanor's youngest son. After returning to London, Eleanor awards Marian for her service, granting her the title of Maid Marian and making her a lady-in-waiting. John informs Eleanor of his intention to become king. Eleanor orders Marian to spy on him, and she learns that John is seeking the Pope's blessing. Having started an affair with Priscilla, Marshal asks the Sheriff for permission to court her and convinces Priscilla to join him in London. Huntingdon spreads rumours that the Sheriff is weak, prompting him to beat and threaten Huntingdon. Since Rob saved her from execution, Ralph had developed feelings for him, but Rob ignores her advances. Struggling to feed his band of outlaws, Rob convinces them to assault Warwick's estate, despite Tuck's reluctance to spill more blood. They successfully steal Warwick's riches, and Rob cripples the lord after he threatens them. Rob and his outlaws then celebrate their success, leading to Rob and Ralph kissing. As punishment for the raid, the Sheriff imprisons Gamewell and the other Saxon elders.
8	"The True Price of Defiance"	John Glenn	Jonathan English & John Glenn	December 14, 2025
Hoping to force Rob out of hiding, the Sheriff plans to execute the Saxon elders. He also reveals to Gamewell that Alwin's betrayal led to Hugh's imprisonment. John brings Rob to a weapons dealer in London, where they purchase steel-tipped arrows. Rob then finds Marian and asks her to deliver a message to the Queen. Marian chastises Rob for his deceit, but her feelings for him remain complicated. Marshal and Priscilla later make their courtship public, inspiring Prince John and Marian to dance together. Eleanor writes a letter to Richard, telling him that his brother seeks the throne. Rob returns to his hideout to learn of Gamewell's impending execution. Milange sneaks the outlaws into Nottingham's castle via a secret entrance, where Rob frees the imprisoned elders. They soon fall into a trap set by the Sheriff and fight against his soldiers, where Warwick kills Henry. John leads everyone to escape the castle while the Sheriff pursues Rob, ending in a duel. The Sheriff gets the upper hand, but Ralph saves Rob. After returning to their hideout, Ralph mourns Henry and seeks to avenge him. Gamewell informs Rob about Alwin's betrayal, who promptly confronts Alwin and kills him in self-defence.
9	"I Choose You"	Peter Webber	Kenny Ryan & Jacob Roman	December 21, 2025
Having convinced the Saxon elder Warin to spy for him, the Sheriff learns the location of Rob's hideout. Rob captures Warwick and, despite Tuck's insistence to spare him, Drew executes the lord. Unable to condone further bloodshed, Tuck leaves the outlaws but later kills Warin to save Rob. Marian delivers Rob's message to Eleanor, who tells Marian of the deal she made with Rob. The Sheriff visits London, where Eleanor informs him that the King has dispatched Guy of Gisbourne to restore order. Fearing Gisbourne's merciless reputation, Eleanor and the Sheriff decide to work together. Prince John assaults Marian after realizing that she is acting as Eleanor's spy before departing for Rome. Eleanor sends Marshal to stop John, but he is forced to leave Priscilla behind. Marian leaves London to warn Rob of Gisbourne's arrival, and Rob later observes Gisbourne's army of hundreds of Norman soldiers. The Sheriff returns to Nottingham and finds that Gisbourne has allied with Huntingdon. Gisbourne then massacres the forester's village to force Rob out of hiding. The Sheriff reluctantly agrees to help Gisbourne kill Rob, seeking only to preserve Nottingham's future. Rob and Marian leave together but discover the ruins of the forester's village.
10	"One Enemy Falls, Another Rises"	Jonathan English	Jonathan English & John Glenn	December 28, 2025
Rob and Marian rekindle their relationship, but when Marian returns home to learn Huntingdon's attack plans, she is captured. A distraught Priscilla informs her father that she is pregnant and the Bishop ensures that Priscilla is confined to a convent. With five hundred Norman soldiers advancing on Rob's hideout, he evacuates and takes over the lightly defended Nottingham. The Norman army soon lays siege, allowing the Sheriff to betray and kill Gisbourne while their soldiers overwhelm the Saxons, forcing them to retreat. Tuck leads a small group to destroy a bridge, stalling Norman reinforcements, but Gamewell and Isabel are killed. The Sheriff then confronts Rob, but he chooses to escape and rescue Marian, who convinces Aleppo to free her, and she helps Rob kill Huntingdon. The Sheriff makes plans to have King Henry killed when he inevitably comes to England to deal with Robin Hood. Rob and his outlaws decide to split up and go into hiding. Ralph, Drew, and Milange head to London while John, Tuck, and Spragart go to France. Priscilla writes a letter to the King to undermine both Eleanor and Rob. Marian returns to Eleanor, who grants Rob clemency and releases Marian from her duties.

== Production ==
=== Development ===
The series received a series order from MGM+ in September 2024, with John Glenn and Jonathan English set as writers and to both executive produce. Glenn also serves as showrunner while English serves as the director of five episodes, including the pilot. Todd Lieberman of Hidden Pictures also serves as an executive producer, while Lionsgate Television acts as the main production studio.

Principal photography began in Serbia in February 2025.

On February 24, 2026, MGM+ renewed the series for a ten-episode second season. Filming began at PFI Studios in Serbia in July 2026.

=== Casting ===
In January 2025, Jack Patten was cast in the lead role of Robin Hood in his television debut. In February, Sean Bean was cast as the Sheriff of Nottingham and Lauren McQueen was cast as Maid Marian. Additional main cast members announced included Lydia Peckham, Steven Waddington, Marcus Fraser, Angus Castle-Doughty, and Henry Rowley. The following month, Connie Nielsen was cast as Eleanor of Aquitaine. In April, Richard Lintern, Erica Ford, Ryan Gage, Oscar Salem, Miloš Timotijević, and Tamara Radovanović were cast in supporting roles. In July, Graeme Thomas King, Tom Mison, Anastasia Griffith, Matija Gredić, Mihailo Lazić, Boban Marjanović, and Jelena Gavrilović also joined the cast in supporting roles.

In July 2026, James Purefoy, Colin O'Donoghue, and Luke Roberts joined the cast for the second season while Graeme Thomas King was promoted to the main cast after guest starring in the first season.

== Release ==
Robin Hood premiered on November 2, 2025, on MGM+.

== Reception ==
On the review aggregator website Rotten Tomatoes, 77% of 13 critics' reviews are positive. The website's consensus reads: "A classical rendition of the Nottingham legend played straight, this Robin Hood doesn't reinvent the longbow but is polished enough to stir up some merriment." Metacritic gave the series a weighted average score of 67 out of 100 based on 6 critics, indicating "generally favorable" reviews.

Carol Midgley of The Times wrote, "Is it any good? It's perfectly fine, if very melodramatic. Bean is, as you'd expect, a hefty presence. I'm just not sure why we needed it, and in ten episodes at that, when it's been dramatised umpteen times before." Ty'Kira Smalls of Common Sense Media gave the series 4/5 stars, saying that it "fleshes out rich, cultural origins for this notable folkloric outlaw. Robin Hood is grounded in history and spirituality. Balanced with nuanced, strong characters, this typical tale is a lot more interesting and refreshing this time around." Lucy Mangan of The Guardian gave it three out of five stars, writing, "Look, by any objective measure Robin Hood is terrible. Subjectively? I couldn't be having more fun and I suspect it will be the same for anyone who goes into it with the right attitude. If it's not for you, fine. You can look forward to whatever great thing Sean Bean does next that this is paying for."

The casting of a black actor as Little John, the depiction of Anglo-Saxon paganism as still having a robust following into the 12th century (when, in reality, Anglo-Saxon England had been thoroughly Christianised by the time of the 11th-century Norman Conquest), and the character of Much the Miller's Son being gender flipped led to accusations of "wokery" being levelled against the series. In an opinion piece for Radio Times, Dr Sean McGlynn (who has written extensively on the Robin Hood legend) said that the racial and religious aspects were indeed historically inaccurate but the depiction of Much the Miller's Son as a disguised woman, while not a feature of any previous retelling of the Robin Hood story, was nevertheless a plausible element owing to the female criminality of the day. McGlynn went on to state that, while there are "many fascinating historical clues" about Robin Hood, the overall legend "was, from the start, designed as entertainment" without a strict requirement for historicity and that the MGM+ series was just another example of how the basic story was "infinitely adaptable".
