= A Fall from Grace =

- Official poster
- Directed by: Tyler Perry
- Written by: Tyler Perry
- Produced by: Mark E. Swinton; Will Areu
- Starring: Crystal Fox; Phylicia Rashad; Bresha Webb; Mehcad Brooks; Cicely Tyson; Tyler Perry
- Cinematography: Terrence Burke
- Edited by: Larry Sexton
- Music by: Jay Weigel
- Production company: Tyler Perry Studios
- Distributed by: Netflix
- Release date: January 17, 2020
- Running time: 120 minutes
- Country: United States
- Language: English

A Fall from Grace is a 2020 American thriller film produced, written, and directed by Tyler Perry and his first to be released by Netflix.

The film follows a woman who finds a dangerous new love and the novice attorney who defends her in a sensational court case.

This was the final film of actor Cicely Tyson before her death in January 2021. The film was panned by critics with main criticism focusing on the screenplay.

== Plot ==
Jasmine Bryant is a public defender who constantly takes plea deals in small town Virginia. Her husband Jordan is a police officer who feels discouraged after witnessing an older woman he attempted to save complete a suicide attempt.

Jasmine is assigned by her boss Rory to defend Grace Waters, a woman accused of murdering her husband Shannon DeLong. Grace insists that she is guilty and will agree to a plea deal if she goes to a prison close by her son Malcolm. Jasmine is troubled by case details, including Shannon's missing body. Rory is not pleased that Jasmine wants to represent the suspect because the department does not have the budget for a trial, and he expects the media frenzy will disrupt their lives.

Grace's best friend Sarah Miller tells Jasmine that Grace was feeling sad after her divorce, so she pushed her to get out and meet someone new. She ended up marrying Shannon. After researching the case, Jasmine and her colleagues Tilsa and Donnie believe Grace is innocent.

Grace tells Jasmine that she met Shannon at a gallery exhibit of his work. He charmed her and they married three months later. She says that Shannon soon became cruel and secretive. After he got Grace's passwords and secretly stole from various accounts, he mortgaged her house with forged documents. Eventually, the bank fired Grace.

The last night, Grace walked in on Shannon and another woman having sex in their marriage bed. Later the couple argued; she beat him with a baseball bat and pushed him down the stairs to the basement. Grace drove away, calling Sarah from the country to confess the killing. Sarah tells Jasmine that when she went to Grace's house, she saw her son Malcolm leaving the house. As Shannon's body is missing, Sarah suggests that Malcolm disposed of it.

At the trial, Jasmine fails to cast doubt on prosecution evidence. Calling Sarah as a witness backfires because phone records show numerous phone calls between the women on the night of the murder, so Sarah finally admits on the stand that Grace confessed to killing Shannon to her.

Grace is found guilty by the jury and Jasmine is fired from her job by Rory. As she is being led away, Grace sees Sarah in the gallery, comforting a sobbing Malcolm. She notices Sarah is wearing a pendant identical to one Shannon had that was supposedly one-of-a-kind. In her cell, Grace thinks back to the times that Sarah was involved in her relationship with Shannon, and screams to the guards that she needs to call her lawyer.

Feeling defeated, Jasmine stops by Sarah's house (a residence for old ladies) and notices the elderly Alice trying to escape from it. She reveals that other women have died there, including Shane Fieldman (Jordan's victim from the beginning of the film).

When Jasmine finds numerous elderly women locked up in the basement, she is kidnapped. Jordan discovers Sarah's criminal history and searches for his wife. Shannon turns out to be alive and is revealed to be Sarah's son. Jordan knocks on the door and asks Sarah if Jasmine is there, which she denies.

When Jordan rings Jasmine, he hears her phone ringing from inside the house, so he bursts in. He tussles with Sarah, handcuffs her, and then looks for Jasmine as Sarah escapes. Jordan and Shannon fight as Jasmine tries to break free. Shannon is shot and is presumably killed.

As the police rescue the elderly women, it is revealed that Sarah and Shannon are really mother and son criminals Betty and Maurice Mills, who have been kidnapping elderly women for their social security information and conning middle aged women out of their life savings for over 25 years, with Grace being one of those middle aged women.

Grace gets one more hearing and this time, Jasmine easily succeeds at getting Grace freed, as Betty and Maurice are wanted in several states for stealing from other numerous women. While everyone celebrates Grace's freedom, Rory congratulates Jasmine for uncovering such a crazy scheme and gives back her job.

Meanwhile, Betty is on the run from the police and has just been hired to take care of an elderly woman in a nursing home.

== Cast ==
- Crystal Fox as Grace Waters
- Phylicia Rashad as Sarah Miller / Betty Mills
- Bresha Webb as Jasmine Bryant
- Mehcad Brooks as Shannon DeLong / Maurice Mills
- Cicely Tyson as Alice
- Tyler Perry as Rory Garraux
- Adrian Pasdar as Prosecutor Bradley Tankerton
- Matthew Law as Jordan Bryant
- Michael Rose as Mr. Clyde
- Donovan Christie Jr. as Donnie
- Walter Fauntleroy as Malcolm Waters
- Angela Marie Rigsby as Tilsa
- Michael Ray Davis as Judge

== Production ==
Principal photography took place at Tyler Perry Studios in fall 2018, over the course of five days.

== Release ==
A Fall from Grace was released in the United States by Netflix on January 17, 2020. The film was watched by 26 million during its first week.

== Reception ==
A Fall from Grace was largely panned by both critics and viewers alike. The film holds an approval rating of 15% on review aggregator website Rotten Tomatoes, based on 27 reviews with an average rating of 3.5/10. The website's critical consensus reads, "Drama for drama's sake does not a great movie make, but boy is it fun to watch A Fall From Grace unravel." On Metacritic, the film holds a rating of 34 out of 100, based on seven critics, indicating "generally unfavorable" reviews.

Many on social media have criticized the glaring errors in the film in the forms of seeing boom microphones, continuity errors, and extras staring directly into the camera and "miming" actions, possibly attributed to the very limited production schedule. Sometime after the film's release, the movie went through further edits and alternate cuts to fix these problems. There were little to no announcements regarding these changes. The line "Ashtray, bitch!", has become something of an internet meme due to its forceful, yet unintentionally funny delivery. Tyler Perry claimed that the line was not in the script and something he had added on the spot stating, "that was my father doing stupid stuff".
