= Henry Rowley =

English comedian

- Education: University of Bristol
- Occupations: Comedian; Actor
- Years active: 2021-present
- Television: Robin Hood

Henry Rowley is an English comedian and actor.

== Early life ==
Rowley is from Leicester and is the son of a therapist and a GP and the youngest of three brothers, one of whom works in accounting and the other in public relations. He studied English literature at the University of Bristol.

== Career ==
Rowley had success making comedy online, he uploaded his first TikTok video in October 2021, with some sketches receiving millions of views. His video sketches were often delivered directly to camera with his style described as mimicry and "finding the sweet spot between characterisation and caricature". His popular characters included posh characters 'Hugo' and 'Minty'. Rowley made his debut at the 2023 Edinburgh Fringe Festival with his show Knock Knock. He also appeared in a play that year at the Fringe entitled My Neighbours are Kinda Weird.

The following year he had critical success with his tour show Just Literally, which he also performed at the Edinburgh Fringe at the Pleasance Theatre.

In February 2025, Rowley was cast for his television acting debut as the character Will Gamewell in MGM+ historical drama series Robin Hood, filmed in Serbia, and broadcast in the November 2025, featuring in the cast including Jack Patten and Sean Bean.

== Filmography ==
Year	Title	Role	Notes
2025	Robin Hood	Will	Recurring role
