= Rock Paper Scissors (novel) =

2021 novel by Alice Feeney

- Author: Alice Feeney
- Language: English
- Genre: Thriller
- Publisher: HarperCollins
- Publication date: August 19, 2021
- Publication place: United Kingdom
- ISBN: 9780008371005

Rock Paper Scissors is a 2021 psychological thriller novel by British author Alice Feeney. The plot follows a couple in an unhappy marriage who take a weekend holiday to a repurposed chapel in the Scottish countryside.

In April 2021, Netflix announced that it would be releasing a six-part series based on the novel, to be produced by Suzanne Mackie.

== Background and publication history ==
Rock Paper Scissors was first published in the United Kingdom by HarperCollins on August 19, 2021, and was published in the United States by Flatiron Books, an imprint of Macmillan Publishers, on September 7, 2021. Luke Speed of Curtis Brown Group and Josie Freeman of ICM Partners represented the rights to the book.

It is the fourth novel by Alice Feeney.

== Reception ==
The novel was listed as one of Real Simple's "59 Best Books of 2021" and received positive reviews in The Concord Insider and Kirkus Reviews. It was also a Book of the Month selection by author Megan Miranda.

== Adaptation ==
In April 2021, five months before Rock Paper Scissors was published, Netflix announced that it would be releasing a six-part series based on the novel, to be produced by Suzanne Mackie under her production company, Orchid Pictures. Feeney expressed her excitement at the adaptation, telling The Sunday Post, "I don't write the books thinking this might be a TV series but with this one, it was the first time I did secretly hope it would make it to the screen. I really wanted that wish to come true."

Filming for the series is set to take place in Scotland.
