= The Good Shepherd (novel) =

1955 war novel by C. S. Forester

- First edition (UK)
- Author: C. S. Forester
- Cover artist: David Cobb
- Language: English
- Genre: Historical novel
- Publisher: Michael Joseph (UK); Little, Brown and Co. (US)
- Publication date: 1955
- Publication place: United Kingdom
- Media type: Hardcover & paperback

The Good Shepherd is a 1955 British novel about naval warfare during World War II, by C. S. Forester, exploring the difficulties of the Battle of the Atlantic, specifically as seen through the eyes of the United States commander of an escort fleet during a 52-hour period: the crews' struggle against the sea, the enemy, and the exhaustion brought on by constant vigilance.

The novel also details the problems of the early radar and ASDIC equipment available, and the poor communications between the fleet and Admiralty using HF Radio and early manual cryptography.

In 2020, the novel was adapted as a film, Greyhound, written, produced by and starring Tom Hanks. That year, an audiobook version of the novel was also published.

== Synopsis ==
The hero of The Good Shepherd is Commander George Krause, the commanding officer of the fictional US Navy Mahan-class destroyer USS Keeling in World War II. Krause is in overall command of an escort group. It is protecting a convoy in the Battle of the Atlantic, shepherding it through the Mid-Atlantic gap, where no antisubmarine aircraft are able to defend convoys. He is in a difficult position.

The subject voyage takes place early in 1942, shortly after the United States' entry into the war. Although Krause is a career Navy officer, with many years of seniority, this is his first wartime mission. The British captains of the other vessels in the escort group are junior to him in rank, and much younger, but they have already been at war for more than two years.

The story covers 13 watches (52 hours) aboard the ship's bridge. It is told in the third person entirely from Krause's point of view as he fights to save his ship. It details his mood swings from his intense and focused excitement and awareness during combat to his letdown afterward, with fatigue, depression, and self-doubt in relation to the other captains under his command. As the novel advances, he is shown to be quite capable.

This book also mainly covers the technology that was used within the war, such as Sonar, and many more.

He is troubled by having been twice passed over for promotion by the Navy review board; they had classified him as fitted and retained because there were few opportunities for advancement in the Navy before the war. Krause was promoted to commander only after the US entered the war, and he partly fears he may be unsuited for this position.

The book focuses on the intense combat between the Keeling and multiple U-boats, with the Keeling eventually racking up multiple kills, and on the ship's daring rescue missions as the convoy increasingly falls prey to the U-boats. The group races against time to help the convoy escape the undefended stretches of the Atlantic.

== Audiobook ==
The book has been adapted as an audiobook, narrated by Edoardo Ballerini and produced by Podium Audio. The audiobook was released in May 2020.

== Film adaptation ==
The novel was adapted in 2020 as the feature film Greyhound, written, produced by, and starring Tom Hanks, and also featuring Stephen Graham. It was directed by Aaron Schneider and produced by Gary Goetzman. Principal photography began aboard the museum ship USS Kidd, a decommissioned destroyer.

The film was relatively faithful to the novel, with two exceptions. The characters and their names are basically the same (e.g. Ernie Krause is George Krause). Krause is more bitter in the novel, because of having been divorced from Evelyn. She had cheated on him, but he recognizes that he had placed the Navy ahead of her. In the movie, Krause has never been married; there is a flashback scene with Krause and Evelyn, and Evelyn says she wants to wait until after the war to get married. Also, in the novel Krause commands a Mahan-class destroyer; in the film Krause commands a Fletcher-class destroyer.

== See also ==
- The Cruel Sea (1951)
- Das Boot (The Boat) (1973)
- HMS Ulysses (1955)
