= Alice Feeney =

British novelist

Alice Feeney (born 1978) is a British novelist and former journalist, writing in the mystery and thriller genres.

== Biography ==
Feeney was born in 1978 and grew up in Essex.

Before becoming a published writer, she joined the BBC at 21 under the name Alison Feeney-Hart, where she worked as a producer and journalist for approximately 15 years. She became a producer for the One O'clock News, a reporter and news editor, and a producer for arts and entertainment programmes.

Feeney started writing her first novel, Sometimes I Lie, when she was 30, writing in her spare time and on the train to work. She took the Faber Academy writing course, finishing the book and course around the same time.

== Adaptations ==
In 2019, Fox bought the television rights to Sometimes I Lie. In November 2019 a television series project was announced, with Sarah Michelle Gellar playing the lead role. Robin Swicord was engaged to adapt the book, and Ellen DeGeneres and Jeff Kleeman, as well as Gellar and Swicord, were to be executive producers. This option later lapsed, and the rights were picked up by Tommy Harper Productions and Matt Charman's Binocular Productions in 2024. Charman and Caryl Lewis are set to write the adaptation.

In 2020, Jessica Chastain, Kristen Campo, and Endeavor acquired the television rights to His & Hers. The series adaptation of the book premiered on Netflix on January 8, 2026.

Her book Rock Paper Scissors has also been optioned for Netflix. My Husband's Wife is being adapted by Carnival Films, and Hidden Pictures and Todd Lieberman acquired the rights to Beautiful Ugly in 2025.

== Bibliography ==
- Feeney, Alice (2018). Sometimes I Lie. Flatiron. ISBN 978-1250144843.
- Feeney, Alice (2019). I Know Who You Are. Flatiron. ISBN 978-1250147349.
- Feeney, Alice (2020). His & Hers. Flatiron. ISBN 978-1250266071.
- Feeney, Alice (2021). Rock Paper Scissors. Flatiron. ISBN 9781250266101.
- Feeney, Alice (2022). Daisy Darker. Flatiron. ISBN 978-1250843937.
- Feeney, Alice (2023). Good Bad Girl. Flatiron. ISBN 978-1250843975.
- Feeney, Alice (2025). Beautiful Ugly. Flatiron. ISBN 978-1250337788.
- Feeney, Alice (2026). My Husband's Wife. Flatiron. ISBN 978-1250337818.
