= Beau Borders =

American sound engineer and race driver

Beau Borders is an American sound engineer and race driver.

Born into a grassroots racing family, Beau Borders’ earliest memories revolve around the white-knuckle world of motorsports. His extensive racing resume includes many wins, podiums, and even a few championships in both open and closed-wheel competition. Beau's racing career has been intertwined with his film career, which began at George Lucas's famed Skywalker Ranch. Since that time, Beau has built quite a profession in Sound Mixing and Editing within the movie industry. He has collaborated on such box office hits as “Titanic”, “The Lord of the Rings” and “Lone Survivor”, for which Beau and his Mixing partners received Academy Award nominations for Sound Mixing in 2014. A further Academy Award as well as a BAFTA nomination came as recent as 2021 for the movie “Greyhound" with Tom Hanks. Beau has competed in the Trans-Am West Series on and off since 2019. He scored a win and several podiums in the Trans-Am Series, and ended up in 2nd place in the GT class. He has also been racing a Factory Five GTM since 2015 when he joined the Prototype Development Group. As a team they have earned many wins and podiums in Endurance Sportscar Racing, and they look forward to many more in the upcoming season. Beau was awarded the 2018 Driver of the Year award by the SCCA NorCal Region, and won both the NASA Western Endurance and SCCA T-2 Class Championships. He currently resides in Venice Beach, California.
