= Jack Patten (actor) =

Australian actor

- Born: 1997 or 1998 (age 28–29); Sydney, Australia
- Education: National Institute of Dramatic Art
- Occupation: Actor
- Years active: 2025–present
- Television: Robin Hood

Jack Patten is an Australian actor. He was cast in 2025 in the lead role in Amazon MGM Studios television series remake of Robin Hood.

== Early life ==
From Sydney's Hills District, Patten started acting after a professional sports career in Australian Rules Football was ended by a knee injury in 2017. He had played for his local club in Pennant Hills before joining the Sydney Swans Academy. He trained in acting initially at The Hub Studio in Chippendale, New South Wales. In 2023, he graduated from the National Institute of Dramatic Art in Sydney.

== Career ==
As well as acting on local theatre, Patten had an early television role in crime procedural series NCIS: Sydney as a surfer named Craig Beachley. He was cast in Patrick Hughes' action film War Machine for Netflix alongside Alan Ritchson.

In January 2025, he was cast in the titular lead role of Rob in Amazon MGM Studios television series remake of Robin Hood alongside Sean Bean and Connie Nielsen, after he was recommended for the role by War Machine film producer Todd Lieberman. First-look images from filming were released later that year ahead of a November 2025 release. Speaking at the London premiere of the series, Patten said that he had not watched a previous iteration of the character prior to playing the role.

== Filmography ==
| Year | Title | Role | Notes |
|---|---|---|---|
| 2025 | NCIS: Sydney | Craig Beachley | 1 episode |
| 2025–present | Robin Hood | Rob | Lead role |
| 2026 | War Machine | 109 | |
| TBA | Greyhound 2 | TBA | Filming |
