= Beautiful Ugly =

2025 thriller novel by Alice Feeney

- Book cover
- Author: Alice Feeney
- Audio read by: Richard Armitage
- Language: English
- Genre: Psychological thriller
- Set in: Scotland
- Publisher: Flatiron Books
- Publication date: 2025
- Publication place: United Kingdom
- Pages: 320
- ISBN: 9781250337788

Beautiful Ugly is a 2025 psychological thriller novel by Alice Feeney. The book follows Grady Green, a once-successful author who retreats to a remote Scottish island after his wife Abby's disappearance, only to encounter unsettling events and a woman who looks exactly like his missing wife.

== Plot ==
Thriller author Grady Green is married to Abby, an investigative journalist. While driving home, Abby stops after seeing a person lying in the road. She exits the car to help the person, but disappears; Grady finds her car still running and abandoned.

One year later, Abby is still missing. Grady's literary agent (and Abby's godmother) Kitty Goldman suggests he get over his writer's block by visiting Amberly, a remote Scottish Isle home to 25 people. She gives him the keys to a cabin she inherited from Charles Whittaker, a famous author who wrote several books on Amberly before his death.

With his Labrador retriever Columbo, Grady travels from London to Amberly and meets Sandy MacIntyre, the ferry captain and island sheriff. Under the cabin's floorboards, Grady discovers an unpublished manuscript by Charles Whittaker, as well as the bones of a human hand. Grady secretly reworks the manuscript and sends it to Kitty. He also tells Sandy about the bones, which have vanished when they look again.

Other strange happenings disturb Grady's stay. Although Amberly reportedly has no telephone service, Grady answers an incoming call to the island's phone box and hears Abby's voice. An unknown person leaves a series of Abby's newspaper articles in the cabin. Grady also repeatedly sees a woman in a red coat who resembles Abby.

Grady learns that Charles was friends with Sandy, who read all of his novels' first drafts. Worried that Sandy will discover his theft of Charles' manuscript, Grady finds her mourning in a dangerous seaside cave where her daughter and other children were once swept away at high tide. Sandy, inebriated, tells him that she was the only person to read the unpublished manuscript, and Grady leaves her to die.

Returning from the cave, Grady encounters the woman in the red coat, who looks just like Abby but has brown eyes instead of blue. She introduces herself as Aubrey and seems not to recognise Grady; he is shocked to learn that she is married to a woman and has a baby girl.

As his mental health worsens, Grady attempts to leave Amberly, but the ferry is not running due to Sandy's disappearance. Inside the island's church, Grady finds Sandy alive as well as Abby, who disguised herself as "Aubrey" using contact lenses. Abby reveals that she lived on Amberly as a child and was the only survivor of the mass drowning; the other children followed her to the cave after she ran away from a teacher who tried to sexually assault her.

It is revealed that Grady was responsible for Abby's disappearance, lying in the road in an attempt to kill her. The couple had argued about whether to have children, and Grady secretly had a vasectomy while Abby secretly used in vitro fertilisation. After finding Abby's positive pregnancy test, Grady believed she was cheating on him. Abby narrowly survived the attack and fled to Amberly.

At the cabin, Grady finds Kitty, who was married to Charles Whittaker and whose real name is also Abby; her best friend and Abby's mother named her daughter after her. Flashback chapters in which "Abby" recounts her marital troubles with her writer husband are actually from Kitty's perspective. Kitty was born on Amberly, and Abby came to live with Kitty and Charles on the island after Abby's mother committed suicide.

Grady also learns that the bones were from the man who tried to assault Abby; he had previously assaulted Kitty, and Kitty's mother severed his hand with an axe. After the children drowned, Sandy killed the man while the other male residents were gradually eliminated through attrition. Amberly has become a refuge for its all-female population, including several women mentioned in Abby's articles.

When Charles—whose books supported Amberly financially—discovered the plan to replace the island's men, he stopped writing and eventually hanged himself in the cabin. Kitty now gives Grady an ultimatum: continue writing to generate income for Amberly, or be killed. A year later, Grady's latest novel Beautiful Ugly is a bestseller; he has hidden a secret message in the book that he is trapped on the island. Grady wakes up in a coffin and finds that he has been buried alive.

== Background ==
According to Feeney, Beautiful Ugly was inspired by a trip she took to Scotland in which she was temporarily stranded in the Outer Hebrides.

== Reception ==
Beautiful Ugly spent two weeks on the New York Times Best Seller list in the "Hardcover Fiction" category. Sarah Lyall, in the Times, called the book one of January 2025's "most exciting" thriller releases that "branches into unexpected directions on multiple fronts". Stuart Kelly of The Scotsman wrote that Beautiful Ugly was a "perfectly serviceable product", though he complained that the plot was "eminently guessable along the lines of being the only possible solution, if temple-grindingly unbelievable."

The Guardian's Alison Flood said that Beautiful Ugly was "packed with twists that I didn’t even guess at" and "maybe a little overblown but an enjoyable ride to a brilliantly dark ending." Kathryne Cardwell, in the Winnipeg Free Press, said the story had a "hurried, awkward feel" with "too many" twists.

Cynthia Price, for Library Journal, said that Feeney had written "another superb domestic psychological thriller with plenty of twists, as her readers have come to expect." Kirkus Reviews wrote that Beautiful Ugly was "deeply satisfying", and that "the book’s slow unfolding of dread, mystery, and then truth is both creative and well-paced." Publishers Weekly called the novel a "letdown" with "flat descriptions" and "flatter characters", adding that Feeney's "trademark twists are more far-fetched than ever."

== Adaptation ==
Todd Lieberman's production company Hidden Pictures acquired the rights to Beautiful Ugly in January 2025, with plans to adapt the book for film.
