= Lathe of Heaven =

Lathe of Heaven may refer to:

- The Lathe of Heaven, a 1971 novel by Ursula K. Le Guin
  - The Lathe of Heaven (film), a 1980 made-for-TV film based on the novel
  - Lathe of Heaven (film), a 2002 made-for-TV film based on the novel
- Lathe of Heaven (album), a 2014 album by jazz saxophonist Mark Turner
