= Robbie Greenberg =

American cinematographer (born 1947)

- Born: Robert Saul Greenberg; July 27, 1947 (age 79); New York City, New York
- Years active: 1973–2012

Robert Saul Greenberg (born July 27, 1947) is an American cinematographer.

== Filmography ==
=== Film ===
Year	Title	Director	Notes
1973	Bizarre Devices	Paul Aratow; Barry J. Spinello	
1974	Lucifer's Women	Paul Aratow	
1978	Youngblood	Noel Nosseck	
1981	Butcher, Baker, Nightmare Maker	William Asher	
1982	Swamp Thing	Wes Craven	Credited as "Robin Goodwin"
1982	Time Walker	Tom Kennedy	
1983	Doctor Dracula	Paul Aratow; Al Adamson	With Gary Graver
1985	Movers & Shakers	William Asher	
1985	Creator	Ivan Passer	
1985	Sweet Dreams	Karel Reisz	
1988	The Milagro Beanfield War	Robert Redford	
1988	Far North	Sam Shepard	
1991	All I Want for Christmas	Robert Lieberman	
1993	Free Willy	Simon Wincer	
1994	Squanto: A Warrior's Tale	Xavier Koller	
1995	Under Siege 2: Dark Territory	Geoff Murphy	
1996	Sunset Park	Steve Gomer	
1997	Fools Rush In	Andy Tennant	
2000	Snow Day	Chris Koch	
2001	Save the Last Dance	Thomas Carter	
2003	A Guy Thing	Chris Koch	
2003	Marci X	Richard Benjamin	
2006	Even Money	Mark Rydell	
2006	The Santa Clause 3: The Escape Clause	Michael Lembeck	
2007	Wild Hogs	Walt Becker	
2010	Crazy on the Outside	Tim Allen	

Short film

Year	Title	Director	Notes
1979	A Rainy Day	Beth Brickell	With J.T. Gillie and Timothy Greenfield-Sanders
2012	Photo Finish	Jordan Sommers	

Concert film

Year	Title	Director	Note
1979	Rust Never Sleeps	Neil Young	With Jon H. Else, Paul Goldsmith, Larry Johnson, David Myers, Hiro Narita and Richard Pearce

=== Television ===
TV movies

Year	Title	Director	Notes
1980	The Lathe of Heaven	David Loxton; Fred Barzyk	
1983	This Girl for Hire	Jerry Jameson	
1983	The Winter of Our Discontent	Waris Hussein	
1984	My Mother's Secret Life	Robert Markowitz	
1986	Second Serve	Anthony Page	
1998	Winchell	Paul Mazursky	
1999	Introducing Dorothy Dandridge	Martha Coolidge	
2000	If These Walls Could Talk 2	Martha Coolidge	Segment "1972"
2001	James Dean	Mark Rydell	
2004	Iron Jawed Angels	Katja von Garnier	
2005	Warm Springs	Joseph Sargent	

TV series

Year	Title	Director	Notes
1988	Pacific Bell: The Rain Children	Robert Allan Black	Miniseries
1993	South of Sunset	Andy Tennant	Episode "Satyricon"
2005	Prison Break	Michael W. Watkins; Brad Turner	Episodes "Allen" and "Cell Test"

== Awards and nominations ==
American Society of Cinematographers

Year	Category	Title	Result
1998	Outstanding Achievement in Cinematography in Motion Picture, Limited Series	Winchell	Won
1999	Outstanding Achievement in Cinematography in Motion Picture, Limited Series	Introducing Dorothy Dandridge	Won
2004	Outstanding Achievement in Cinematography in Motion Picture, Limited Series	Iron Jawed Angels	Won
2005	Outstanding Achievement in Cinematography in Motion Picture, Limited Series	Warm Springs	Won

Camerimage

Year	Category	Title	Result
2006	Golden Frog	Even Money	Nominated

Primetime Emmy Awards

Year	Category	Title	Result
1998	Outstanding Cinematography for a Miniseries or a Movie	Winchell	Won
1999	Outstanding Cinematography for a Miniseries or a Movie	Introducing Dorothy Dandridge	Won
2001	Outstanding Cinematography for a Miniseries or a Movie	James Dean	Nominated
2004	Outstanding Cinematography for a Miniseries or a Movie	Iron Jawed Angels	Nominated
2005	Outstanding Cinematography for a Miniseries or a Movie	Warm Springs	Nominated
