= American Society of Cinematographers Award for Outstanding Achievement in Cinematography in Motion Picture, Limited Series, or Pilot Made for Television =

Annual award

The American Society of Cinematographers Award for Outstanding Achievement in Cinematography in Motion Picture, Limited Series, or Pilot Made for Television is an annual award given by the American Society of Cinematographers to cinematographers working in the field of television film, limited series or television pilots (or the first episode of a series). It has been awarded, in some capacity, since 1986. From 2009 to 2013, pilot episodes were moved in competition with regular series, but returned in 2014, where it has since remained.

== Winners and nominees ==
=== 1980s ===
Year	Program	Episode	Nominees	Network
1987	Outstanding Achievement in Cinematography in Mini-Series or Specials			
1987	Christmas Snow		Philip H. Lathrop	NBC
1987	Kojak: The Price of Justice		Victor J. Kemper	CBS
1987	Promise		Gayne Rescher	CBS
1987	Rage of Angels: The Story Continues	"Part II"	Jack Priestley	NBC
1987	When the Bough Breaks		James Crabe	NBC
1988
1988	War and Remembrance		Dietrich Lohmann	ABC
1988	Hemingway		Wolfgang Treu	CBS
1988	Lincoln		William Wages	NBC
1988	Noble House		Gábor Pogány	NBC
1988	Outstanding Achievement in Cinematography in a Movie of the Week or Pilot			
1988	Little Girl Lost		Philip H. Lathrop	ABC
1988	The Caine Mutiny Court-Martial		Jacek Laskus	CBS
1988	Davy Crockett: Rainbow in the Thunder		Isidore Mankofsky	ABC
1988	Lena: My Hundred Children		Eric Van Haren Noman	NBC
1988	Shooter		Gayne Rescher	NBC
1989
1989	Single Women Married Men		Gayne Rescher	CBS
1989	A Cry for Help: The Tracey Thurman Story		Eric Van Haren Noman	NBC
1989	Everybody's Baby: The Rescue of Jessica McClure		Shelly Johnson	ABC
1989	My Name Is Bill W.		Neil Roach	ABC
1989	The Young Riders	"The Kid"	John Toll	ABC

=== 1990s ===
Year	Program	Episode	Nominees	Network
1990	Outstanding Achievement in Cinematography in Miniseries			
1990	Lucky Chances	"Part I"	Gayne Rescher	NBC
1990	The Great Los Angeles Earthquake	"Part II"	Dennis Lewiston	NBC
1990	Voices Within: The Story of Truddi Chase	"Part II"	William Wages	ABC
1990	Outstanding Achievement in Cinematography in a Movie of the Week or Pilot			
1990	Murder in Mississippi		Donald M. Morgan	ABC
1990	Caroline?		William Wages	CBS
1990	The Court-Martial of Jackie Robinson		Don Burgess	TNT
1990	Gabriel's Fire	"Pilot"	Thomas Alger Olgeirson	ABC
1990	Twin Peaks	"Pilot"	Ronald Víctor García	ABC
1991	Outstanding Achievement in Cinematography in Miniseries			
1991	Love, Lies and Murder		Isidore Mankofsky	NBC
1991	False Arrest		Robert Draper	ABC
1991	In a Child's Name		Daryn Okada	CBS
1991	Outstanding Achievement in Cinematography in a Movie of the Week or Pilot			
1991	Dillinger		Donald M. Morgan	ABC
1991	Civil Wars	"Pilot"	Brian J. Reynolds	ABC
1991	I’ll Fly Away	"Pilot"	William Wages	NBC
1991	Reasonable Doubts	"Pilot"	Robert Primes	NBC
1991	Reason for Living: The Jill Ireland Story		Jon Kranhouse	NBC
1992	Outstanding Achievement in Cinematography in Miniseries			
1992	Drug Wars: The Cocaine Cartel		Roy H. Wagner	NBC
1992	The Burden of Proof		Kees Van Oostrum	ABC
1992	Intruders		Tom Priestley Jr.	CBS
1992	MGM: When the Lion Roars		Michael Lonzo	TNT
1992	Sinatra		Reynaldo Villalobos	CBS
1992	Outstanding Achievement in Cinematography in a Movie of the Week or Pilot			
1992	Stalin		Vilmos Zsigmond	HBO
1992	Affairs of the Heart		Chuck Vincent	HBO
1992	An American Story		Johnny E. Jensen	CBS
1992	Citizen Cohn		Paul Elliot	HBO
1992	When No One Would Listen		Richard L. Rawlings	CBS
1993	Outstanding Achievement in Cinematography in Miniseries			
1993	Return to Lonesome Dove		Kees Van Oostrum	CBS
1993	A Matter of Justice		Robert Draper	NBC
1993	Murder in the Heartland	"Part 1"	Ronald Víctor García	ABC
1993	Trade Winds	"Part 3"	Isidore Mankofsky	ABC
1993	Wild Palms	"The Floating World"	Phedon Papamichael	ABC
1993	Outstanding Achievement in Cinematography in a Movie of the Week or Pilot			
1993	Geronimo		Donald M. Morgan	TNT
1993	NYPD Blue	"Pilot"	Bing Sokolsky	ABC
1993	seaQuest DSV	"To Be or Not to Be"	Kenneth Zunder	NBC
1993	To Dance with the White Dog		Neil Roach	CBS
1993	The X-Files	"Pilot"	Thomas Del Ruth	Fox
1994	Outstanding Achievement in Cinematography in Miniseries			
1994	Family Album	"Part 1"	Michael Watkins	NBC
1994	Million Dollar Babies		David Franco	CBS
1994	North & South: Book III- Heaven and Hell	"Spring 1866 - Spring/Summer 1866"	Don E. FauntLeRoy	ABC
1994	Oldest Living Confederate Widow Tells All	"Part 2"	Edward J. Pei	CBS
1994	Scarlett	"Episode 1"	Tony Imi	CBS
1994	Outstanding Achievement in Cinematography in a Movie of the Week or Pilot			
1994	ER	"24 Hours"	Thomas Del Ruth	NBC
1994	Amelia Earhart: The Final Flight		Lauro Escorel	TNT
1994	And the Band Played On		Paul Elliot	HBO
1994	Chicago Hope	"Pilot"	Tim Suhrstedt	CBS
1994	Earth 2	"First Contact"	Félix Enríquez Alcalá	NBC
1995	Outstanding Achievement in Cinematography in Miniseries			
1995	Streets of Laredo		Edward J. Pei	CBS
1995	The Invaders		Alar Kivilo	Fox
1995	Picture Windows	"Soir Bleu"	Paul Sarossy	Showtime
1995	Zoya		Laszlo George	NBC
1995	Outstanding Achievement in Cinematography in a Movie of the Week or Pilot			
1995	Truman		Paul Elliot	HBO
1995	Divas		Ronald Víctor García	Fox
1995	Falling for You		David Franco	CBS
1995	Kingfish: A Story of Huey P. Long		Alexander Gruszynski	TNT
1995	White Dwarf		Phedon Papamichael	Fox
1996	Outstanding Achievement in Cinematography in Miniseries			
1996	The Siege at Ruby Ridge		Donald M. Morgan	CBS
1996	In Cold Blood		Peter Woeste	CBS
1996	Pandora's Clock		Steven Shaw	NBC
1996	Outstanding Achievement in Cinematography in a Movie of the Week or Pilot			
1996	Riders of the Purple Sage		William Wages	TNT
1996	Gotti		Alar Kivilo	HBO
1996	Hidden in Silence		Michael D. Margulies	Lifetime
1996	Millennium	"Pilot"	Peter Wunstorf	Fox
1996	Rasputin: Dark Servant of Destiny		Elemér Ragályi	HBO
1996	What Love Sees		Robert Draper	CBS
1997	Outstanding Achievement in Cinematography in Miniseries			
1997	George Wallace		Alan Caso	TNT
1997	Intensity		David Franco	Fox
1997	Medusa’s Child		Kees Van Oostrum	ABC
1997	Outstanding Achievement in Cinematography in a Movie of the Week or Pilot			
1997	Buffalo Soldiers		William Wages	TNT
1997	The Garden of Redemption		Jacek Laskus	Showtime
1997	The Inheritance		Shelly Johnson	CBS
1997	Oliver Twist		Bing Sokolsky	ABC
1997	Snow White: A Tale of Terror		Mike Southon	Showtime
1998	Outstanding Achievement in Cinematography in Movies of the Week, Pilots or Miniseries			
1998	Winchell		Robbie Greenberg	HBO
1998	The Day Lincoln Was Shot		Ronald Víctor García	CBS
1998	The Fixer		Michael Goi	Showtime
1998	The Rat Pack		Shane Hurlbut	HBO
1998	When Trumpets Fade		Thomas Burstyn	HBO
1999
1999	Introducing Dorothy Dandridge		Robbie Greenberg	HBO
1999	Joan of Arc		Pierre Gill	CBS
1999	Mind Prey		Bing Sokolsky	ABC
1999	Strange Justice		Jonathan Freeman	Showtime
1999	The West Wing	"Pilot"	Thomas Del Ruth	NBC

=== 2000s ===
Year	Program	Episode	Nominees	Network
2000	Outstanding Achievement in Cinematography in Movies of the Week, Mini-Series or Pilot (Cable)			
2000	The Crossing		Rene Ohashi	A&E
2000	Dune		Vittorio Storaro	Sci-Fi Channel
2000	For Love or Country: The Arturo Sandoval Story		Donald M. Morgan	HBO
2000	High Noon		Robert McLachlan	TBS
2000	Witchblade		Anghel Decca	TNT
2000	Outstanding Achievement in Cinematography in Movies of the Week, Mini-Series or Pilot (Network)			
2000	Cora Unashamed		Ernest Holzmann	PBS
2000	Jason and the Argonauts		Sergei Kozlov	CBS
2000	King of the World		Eric Van Haren Noman	NBC
2000	The Moving of Sophia Myles		William Wages	CBS
2000	Papa's Angels		Brian J. Reynolds	CBS
2001	Outstanding Achievement in Cinematography in Movies of the Week, Mini-Series or Pilot (Cable)			
2001	Attila		Steven Fierberg	USA
2001	Boss of Bosses		Brian J. Reynolds	TNT
2001	Just Ask My Children		Lowell Peterson	Lifetime
2001	Prancer Returns		Bruce Worrall	USA
2001	What Girls Learn		Malcolm Cross	Showtime
2001	Outstanding Achievement in Cinematography in Movies of the Week, Mini-Series or Pilot (Network)			
2001	Uprising		Denis Lenoir	NBC
2001	24	"12:00 a.m. – 1:00 a.m."	Peter Levy	Fox
2001	Citizen Baines	"Pilot"	Ernest Holzmann	CBS
2001	Don Giovanni Unmasked		Rene Ohashi	PBS
2001	Smallville	"Pilot"	Peter Wunstorf	The WB
2002	Outstanding Achievement in Cinematography in Movies of the Week, Mini-Series or Pilot (Cable)			
2002	Last Call		Jeffrey Jur	Showtime
2002	The Case of the Whitechapel Vampire		Serge Ladouceur	Hallmark Channel
2002	Miss Lettie and Me		William Wages	TNT
2002	Point of Origin		Anthony Nakonechnyj	USA
2002	Taken	"John"	Jonathan Freeman	Sci Fi
2002	Outstanding Achievement in Cinematography in Movies of the Week, Mini-Series or Pilot (Network)			
2002	CSI: Crime Scene Investigation/CSI: Miami	"Cross Jurisdictions"	Michael Barrett	CBS
2002	American Dreams	"Pilot"	Brian J. Reynolds	NBC
2002	Birds of Prey	"Pilot"	Clark Mathis	The WB
2002	Carrie		Victor Goss	NBC
2002	Haunted	"Pilot"	Peter Wunstorf	UPN
2003	Outstanding Achievement in Cinematography in Movies of the Week, Mini-Series or Pilot (Cable)			
2003	Carnivàle	"Milfay"	Tami Reiker	HBO
2003	Angels in America		Stephen Goldblatt	HBO
2003	Out of the Ashes		Donald M. Morgan	Showtime
2003	The Pentagon Paper		Michael Mayers	FX
2003	The Roman Spring of Mrs. Stone		Ashley Rowe	Showtime
2003	Outstanding Achievement in Cinematography in Movies of the Week, Mini-Series or Pilot (Network)			
2003	Hitler: The Rise of Evil		Pierre Gill	CBS
2003	Brush with Fate		Eric Noman Van Haren	CBS
2003	Las Vegas	"Pilot"	Bill Roe	NBC
2003	The Lyon's Den	"Pilot"	Michael Mayers	NBC
2003	Miracles	"The Ferguson Syndrome"	Ernest Holzmann	ABC
2004	Outstanding Achievement in Cinematography in Movies of the Week, Mini-Series or Pilot (Cable)			
2004	Iron Jawed Angels		Robbie Greenberg	HBO
2004	Frankenstein	"Episode 1"	Alan Caso	Hallmark Channel
2004	The Life and Death of Peter Sellers		Peter Levy	HBO
2004	Salem’s Lot		Ben Nott	TNT
2004	Spartacus		Kees Van Oostrum	USA
2004	Outstanding Achievement in Cinematography in Movies of the Week, Mini-Series or Pilot (Network)			
2004	Homeland Security		Jonathan Freeman	NBC
2004	The Five People You Meet In Heaven		Kramer Morgenthau	ABC
2004	Judas		Michael Goi	ABC
2004	Lost	"Pilot"	Larry Fong	ABC
2004	Medical Investigation	"You're Not Alone"	Clark Mathis	NBC
2005	Outstanding Achievement in Cinematography in Television Movies, Miniseries or Pilots			
2005	Warm Springs		Robbie Greenberg	HBO
2005	Code Breakers		Thomas Del Ruth	ESPN
2005	Faith of My Fathers		Bill Roe	A&E
2005	Into the West	"Wheel to the Stars"	Shane Hurlbut	TNT
2005	Reefer Madness: The Movie Musical		Jan Kiesser	Showtime
2006
2006	Nightmares & Dreamscapes: From the Stories of Stephen King	"Umney's Last Case"	John Stokes	TNT
2006	Day Break	"Pilot"	Bill Roe	ABC
2006	Heroes	"Genesis"	Adam Kane	NBC
2006	The Librarian: Return to King Solomon's Mines		Walt Lloyd	TNT
2006	Studio 60 on the Sunset Strip	"Pilot"	Thomas Del Ruth	NBC
2007
2007	The Company	"Episode 1"	Ben Nott	TNT
2007	Bury My Heart at Wounded Knee		David Franco	HBO
2007	Jesse Stone: Sea Change		Rene Ohashi	CBS
2007	Pushing Daisies	"Pie-lette"	Michael Weaver	ABC
2007	Raines	"Pilot"	Oliver Bokelberg	NBC
2008
2008	Eleventh Hour	"Resurrection"	David Stockton	CBS
2008	The Andromeda Strain	"Part 1"	Jon Joffin	A&E
2008	Fringe	"Pilot"	Michael Bonvillain	Fox
2008	Life on Mars	"Out Here in the Fields"	Kramer Morgenthau	ABC
2008	My Own Worst Enemy	"Breakdown"	Oliver Bokelberg	NBC
2009	Outstanding Achievement in Cinematography in Television Movies or Miniseries			
2009	Taking Chance		Alar Kivilo	HBO
2009	The Courageous Heart of Irena Sendler		Jerzy Zieliński	CBS
2009	Jesse Stone: Thin Ice		Rene Ohashi	CBS

=== 2010s ===
Year	Program	Episode	Nominees	Network
2010
2010	The Pacific	"Okinawa"	Stephen F. Windon	HBO
2010	Alice	"Episode 2"	Jon Joffin	Syfy
2010	Jesse Stone: No Remorse		David Gribble	CBS
2011
2011	Page Eight		Martin Ruhe	PBS
2011	Any Human Heart	"Episode 2"	Wojciech Szepel	PBS
2011	Chicago Overcoat		Kevin Moss	Showtime
2011	The Kennedys	"Moral Issues and Inner Turmoil"	David Moxness	ReelzChannel
2011	Mildred Pierce	"Part Five"	Edward Lachman	HBO
2012
2012	Great Expectations		Florian Hoffmeister	PBS
2012	American Horror Story: Asylum	"I Am Anne Frank"	Michael Goi	FX
2012	Hatfields & McCoys		Arthur Reinhart	History
2012	Hemingway & Gellhorn		Rogier Stoffers	HBO
2013
2013	Killing Lincoln		Jeremy Benning	National Geographic Channel
2013	Dancing on the Edge	"Episode 1"	Ashley Rowe	Starz
2013	The White Queen	"War at First Hand"	David Luther	Starz
2014	Outstanding Achievement in Cinematography in Television Movies, Miniseries or Pilots			
2014	Manhattan	"You Always Hurt the One You Love"	John Lindley	WGN America
2014	Deliverance Creek		Theo van de Sande	Lifetime
2014	Gotham	"Pilot"	David Stockton	Fox
2014	The Trip to Bountiful		David Greene	Lifetime
2015
2015	Casanova	"Pilot"	Pierre Gill	Amazon
2015	Bessie		Jeffrey Jur	HBO
2015	Blindspot	"Who is Jane Doe"	Martin Ahlgren	NBC
2015	The Man in the High Castle	"The New World"	James Hawkinson	Amazon
2015	Marco Polo	"The Wayfarer"	Romain Lacourbas	Netflix
2016
2016	The Night Of	"Subtle Beast"	Igor Martinovic	HBO
2016	All the Way		Jim Denault	HBO
2016	The Exorcist	"Chapter One: And Let My Cry Come Unto Thee"	Alex Disenhof	Fox
2016	Harley and the Davidsons	"Amazing Machine"	Balazs Bolygo	Discovery
2016	Westworld	"The Original"	Paul Cameron	HBO
2017	Outstanding Achievement in Cinematography in Motion Picture, Miniseries, or Pilot Made for Television			
2017	Genius	"Chapter One"	Mathias Herndl	Nat Geo
2017	The Deuce	"Pilot"	Pepe Avila del Pino	HBO
2017	Mindhunter	"Episode 1"	Christopher Probst	Netflix
2017	Sometimes the Good Kill		Serge Desrosiers	Lifetime
2017	Training Day	"Apocalypse Now"	Shelly Johnson	CBS
2018
2018	Patrick Melrose	"Bad News"	James Friend	Showtime
2018	Alias Grace	"Part 1"	Brendan Steacy	Netflix
2018	Genius: Picasso	"Chapter One"	Mathias Herndl	Nat Geo
2018	The Marvelous Mrs. Maisel	"Pilot"	M. David Mullen	Amazon
2018	The Terror	"Go for Broke"	Florian Hoffmeister	AMC
2019
2019	The Terror: Infamy	"A Sparrow in a Swallow's Nest"	John Conroy	AMC
2019	Catch-22	"Episode 5"	Martin Ruhe	Hulu
2019	Doom Patrol	"Pilot"	Chris Manley	DC Universe
2019	The Rook	"Chapter 1"	P.J. Dillon	Starz
2019	The Twilight Zone	"Blurryman"	Craig Wrobleski	CBS All Access

=== 2020s ===
Year	Program	Episode	Nominees	Network
2020
2020	The Queen's Gambit	"End Game"	Steven Meizler	Netflix
2020	Fargo	"The Birthplace of Civilization"	Pete Konczal	FX
2020	The Great	"The Great"	Anette Haellmigk	Hulu
2020	The Plot Against America	"Part 6"	Martin Ahlgren	HBO
2020	Watchmen	"This Extraordinary Being"	Gregory Middleton	HBO
2021
2021	The Underground Railroad	"Chapter 9: Indiana Winter"	James Laxton	Amazon
2021	Foundation	"The Emperor’s Peace"	Steve Annis	Apple TV+
2021	Halston	"The Party’s Over"	Tim Ives	Netflix
2021	Lupin	"Chapter 1"	Christophe Nuyens	Netflix
2021	Mare of Easttown	"Illusions"	Ben Richardson	HBO
2022
2022	The Old Man	"I"	Sean Porter	FX
2022	Guillermo del Toro's Cabinet of Curiosities	"The Autopsy"	Anastas Michos	Netflix
2022	Guillermo del Toro's Cabinet of Curiosities	"The Outside"	Jeremy Benning	Netflix
2022	Lost Ollie	"Bali Hai"	C. Kim Miles	Netflix
2022	Winning Time: The Rise of the Lakers Dynasty	"The Swan"	Todd Banhazl	HBO

== Cinematographers with multiple wins ==
4 wins

- Robbie Greenberg
- Donald M. Morgan

2 wins

- Pierre Gill
- Philip H. Lathrop
- Gayne Rescher
- William Wages

== Cinematographers with multiple nominations ==
8 nominations

- William Wages

6 nominations

- Donald M. Morgan

5 nominations

- Thomas Del Ruth

4 nominations

- David Franco
- Ronald Víctor García
- Robbie Greenberg
- Rene Ohashi
- Kees Van Oostrum
- Gayne Rescher
- Brian J. Reynolds

3 nominations

- Robert Draper
- Paul Elliott
- Jonathan Freeman
- Pierre Gill
- Michael Goi
- Ernest Holzmann
- Shelly Johnson
- Alar Kivilo
- Isidore Mankofsky
- Eric Van Haren Noman
- Bill Roe
- Bing Sokolsky
- Peter Wunstorf

2 nominations

- Martin Ahlgren
- Jeremy Benning
- Oliver Bokelberg
- Alan Caso
- Mathias Herndl
- Florian Hoffmeister
- Shane Hurlbut
- Jon Joffin
- Jeffrey Jur
- Jacek Laskus
- Philip H. Lathrop
- Peter Levy
- Clark Mathis
- Michael Mayers
- Kramer Morgenthau
- Ben Nott
- Phedon Papamichael
- Edward J. Pei
- Neil Roach
- Ashley Rowe
- Martin Ruhe
- David Stockton
