= Moonstalker =

- VHS artwork
- Directed by: Michael O'Rourke
- Written by: Michael O'Rourke
- Produced by: Sally Smith
- Starring: Blake Gibbons; Ingrid Vold; John Marzilli; Tom Hamil; Jill Foors; Joe Balogh
- Cinematography: Michael Goi
- Edited by: Colin Hobson
- Music by: Douglas Pipes
- Production company: American Bluebell Films
- Distributed by: American Cinema Marketing
- Release date: 1989
- Running time: 92 minutes
- Country: United States
- Language: English

Moonstalker is a 1989 American slasher film written and directed by Michael O'Rourke and starring Ernest Abernathy, Blake Gibbons, John Marzilli, and Kelly Mullis. Its plot follows a group of wilderness training campers near Reno, Nevada who are stalked by a murderous maniac.

== Plot ==
In a rural mountainous region outside Reno, Nevada, Harry, his wife Vera, son Mikey and daughter Tracy are having a wintry camping excursion. They are interrupted by the arrival of Denton Bromley, an indigent but kindly man hauling a trailer. The family decide to invite Denton, or Pop, as he calls himself, to join them overnight. Pop tells the family how he raised his son, Bernie, in a nearby cabin, but that Bernie fled into the forest and went mad after land developers attempted to raze their cabin to build a resort. Pop claims Bernie died in an institution, but, in fact, the deranged Bernie is still alive, kept chained in a straitjacket in Pop's trailer. Pop periodically lets Bernie loose to stalk wealthy tourists from out of town, killing them and stealing their valuables.

That night, Tracy goes for a walk near the river. Meanwhile, Bernie enters the family's trailer and murders Harry, Vera, and Mikey. Tracy returns and finds her family's corpses, along with Pop and Bernie. As Pop attempts to abscond with the family's microwave, he suffers a heart attack and dies. Tracy flees through the woods and manages to evade Bernie.

Nearby, Bobby and his friend Ron are directing members enrolled in a wilderness training program to their camp. They are met by Debbie Harris, to whom they give directions to the camp. Meanwhile, P. J., another of the campers en route to the wilderness retreat, stumbles upon Harry and Vera's campsite, and is strangled to death by Bernie with a chain. Bernie removes his straitjacket and impersonates P. J., donning his jeans, sunglasses, and cowboy hat, and drives P. J.'s Jeep down one of the mountain roads. Tracy stops the car, but flees in horror when she realizes the driver is Bernie. Bernie chases her down the road, striking and killing her with the vehicle.

Still impersonating P. J., Bernie proceeds to drive to the wilderness training camp. Debbie's car breaks down, and Ron and Regis proceed to give her a ride to the camp. Bernie begins to dispatch members of the wilderness troupe, first killing Jane and her boyfriend in their tent before the others gather for their first meeting, overseen by the stern camp director, Regis, and his eccentric girlfriend, Marcie. After, the group regale each other around the campfire with the legend of Bernie. As the group head to their tents to sleep, Debbie, fascinated by the story, asks Ron to accompany her to see Bernie's dilapidated familial cabin, to which he agrees.

Bernie proceeds to kill and dismembers Marcie in her tent with an axe, before chopping off Regis's arm and shooting him to death with his own gun. He then attacks Chet and Vera in the camp's makeshift shower, scalding Vera before hacking Chet to death. Meanwhile, Ron and Debbie enter Bernie's cabin and start a fire in the hearth to dry off. Back at Harry and Vera's camp, police discover the bodies and detective Tom Taylor begins investigating the murders. Tom surmises the killer to be a crazed methamphetamine addict. Back at the training camp, Bobby confronts Bernie, believing him to be P. J., and is killed with a knife. Sophie, who witnesses the murder, flees back to the camp only to be captured by Bernie.

Shortly after, Tom finds what appears to be a group of teenagers singing and swaing around a campfire in the woods. When he approaches, he finds it to be the numerous corpses of Bernie's victims tied to a swinging board, with a boombox playing campfire songs; attached to the rope is Sophie, in a makeshift noose, struggling to get air. Tom unsuccessfully attempts to save her, only to be impaled by Bernie with a spear. As Debbie and Ron leave the cabin, Bernie appears, killing Ron. Debbie flees back to the camp, and manages to shoot Bernie with a shotgun.

At dawn, an ambulance transports Debbie and Tom, the latter clinging to life, down the mountain. Moments after the ambulance departs, Bernie passes by in one of the police officers' vehicles.

== Cast ==
- Blake Gibbons as Bernie
- John Marzilli as Regis
- Ernest Abernathy as Harry
- Kelly Mullis as Tracy
- Ingrid Vold as Marcie
- Alex Wexler as Bobby
- Tom Hamil as Denton Bromley "Pop"
- Ann McFadden as Vicky
- Joe Balogh as Ron
- Neil Kinsella as Detective Tom Taylor
- Ken Hanes as P.J.
- Pamela Ross as Sophie
- Michael Capellupo as Boy
- Jill Foors as Debbie
- Joleen Mullins as Vera
- Joseph Christopher as Chet
- Sioux-z Jessup as Jane
- Ron K. Collie as Mikey
- Larry Coven as Paramedic
- Carl Solomon as Paramedic
- Sam Williams as Female Deputy
- Mark Archuleta as Driving Paramedic / Photographer

== Release ==
=== Home media ===
The film was released on Blu-ray by FilmRise on July 16, 2016. Vinegar Syndrome released the film on Blu-ray in a newly-restored print on November 25, 2022, as part of their Homegrown Horrors: Volume II box set, alongside Hanging Heart (1989) and Dead Girls (1990).
