= Chapter 2 (American Horror Story) =

- American Horror Story episode
- Episode no.: Season 6 Episode 2
- Directed by: Michael Goi
- Written by: Tim Minear
- Production code: 6ATS02
- Original air date: September 21, 2016
- Running time: 40 minutes

Guest appearances
- Lady Gaga as Scathach; Adina Porter as Lee Harris; Charles Malik Whitfield as Mason Harris; Colby French as Police Officer

Episode chronology
← Previous "Chapter 1"	Next → "Chapter 3"
- American Horror Story: Roanoke

"Chapter 2" is the second episode of the sixth season of the anthology television series American Horror Story. It aired on September 21, 2016, on the cable network FX. The episode was written by Tim Minear and directed by Michael Goi.

== Plot ==
Shelby assumes the ritual she witnessed was staged and is chased to the road where she is nearly run over by Lee. At the hospital, Shelby is cleared of having hallucinogens in her system as she tells her story of human sacrifice. The investigating officers found no evidence of her tale. The next morning, she tells Matt that she thinks the mountain men created an elaborate hoax to drive them away from the property, and that she and Matt will not be driven from their new home and investment so easily, She resolves to stay in the house.

Lee's testimonial expounds on her custody arrangements as her ex-husband Mason brings their daughter Flora to visit as part of the couple's arranged custody schedule. As Flora explores the house, she begins talking to an unseen girl named Priscilla, whom Lee believes is an imaginary friend. Matt and Shelby experience more disturbing incidents, now involving a pair of ghostly nurses. After discovering a burning totem in the woods near the house, Matt and Shelby finally secured the help of the local police to showed little interest.

Mason arrives to pick up Flora and finds her playing a game of hide and seek with Priscilla. Flora tells him that she offered her doll to Priscilla in exchange for not murdering her family, but since Mason interrupted the trade, Flora will merely be killed last. Upon hearing this, Mason takes Flora away from the house and promises Lee that she will never return, causing Lee to end her sobriety.

That night, Matt and Shelby discover a storm cellar under the backyard. There, they watched a videotape recorded by one of the house's previous owners, Dr. Elias Cunningham. Dr. Cunningham describes the same malevolent forces pursuing him that the couple has been experiencing and that he was studying the story of the nurses, Miranda and Bridget Jane. The sisters killed their retirement home patients based on the first letters of the victims' names, spelling the word "Murder". The final footage on the tape is of him being surprised by a woman behind him in a mirror. A sudden noise causes Matt and Shelby to flee the room, where they find a bloody cleaver freshly embedded in the swinging front door.

The next day, the banker refuses to return the money they used to buy the house, despite not warning them about the house's gruesome past. The bank's agent leaves as Lee arrives, having absconded with Flora in violation of the custody arrangement. While Shelby is distracted on the phone, Flora is beckoned outside by a mysterious figure. When the adults are not able to find Flora, they frantically search for her in the house and then in the woods, where they find Flora's hoodie hanging at the top of a massive pine tree.

== Reception ==
"Chapter 2" was watched by 3.27 million people during its original broadcast, and gained a 1.8 ratings share among adults aged 18–49.

The episode received a 64% approval rating on Rotten Tomatoes, based on 14 reviews with an average score of 6.1/10. The critical consensus reads, "The tried and true premise that emerges in "Chapter 2" is undermined by superficial exposition that damages its credibility – even in the context of American Horror Story."
