= Two Soldiers (2003 film) =

2003 film

- Poster
- Directed by: Aaron Schneider
- Written by: Aaron Schneider
- Based on: "Two Soldiers" by William Faulkner
- Produced by: Andrew J. Sacks
- Starring: Jonathan Furr; Ben Allison
- Cinematography: David Boyd
- Edited by: Aaron Schneider; Kelly Matsumoto
- Music by: Alan Silvestri
- Production company: Shoe Clerk Picture Company
- Distributed by: Westlake Entertainment Group
- Release date: August 1, 2003
- Running time: 40 minutes
- Country: United States
- Language: English

Two Soldiers is a 2003 American short drama film written and directed by Aaron Schneider. In 2004, it won an Oscar for Best Short Subject at the 76th Academy Awards. It is based on a 1942 short story by William Faulkner.

== Cast ==
- Jonathan Furr as Willie Grier
- Ben Allison as Pete Grier
- Ron Perlman as Colonel McKellog
- David Andrews as Lieutenant Hogenbeck
- Mike Pniewski as Sheriff Foote
- Deacon Dawson as Mr. Grossnickel
- Joanne Pankow as Mrs. Habersham
- Danny Vinson as Pap Grier
- Suellen Yates as Maw Grier
- David Hall as Private
- D. H. Johnson as Colonel's Driver
- Al Wiggins as Man on the Bus
- Allan Hamilton as Bus Driver
- Warren Jack Hendon as Old Man Killegrew
- Nancy Saunders as Old Lady Killegrew
- Lorenzo Meachum as Blues Guitarist
- Lisa Boston as Woman on Street

== Production ==
Filming took place over 12 days in North Carolina, including in Winston-Salem, Yadkinville and Mocksville.
