= Blake Gibbons =

American actor

- Born: June 21, 1961 (age 64); Bakersfield, California, U.S.
- Occupation: Actor

Blake Gibbons (b. Bakersfield, California, June 21, 1961) is an American actor best known for his recurring role as Coleman on the long running daytime television serial General Hospital. He also played "The Dude" (Lyle) in "The Summer of George" episode of Seinfeld.

== Film ==
Year	Film	Role
1988	Lethal Pursuit	
1989	Moonstalker	Bernie
1992	Night Trap	
1992	The Minster's Wife	Bobby Miles
1993	Empty Cradle	Tom Burke
2003	Hollywood Homicide	
2003	Wake	Raymond Riven
1996	The Circle of Fear	Del Starkey
1999	Survival	
2004	The Legend of Butch & Sundance	Durango
2005	Dependency	
2006	A.I. Assault	
2006	You and I	
2006	Love's Abiding Joy	Joe Paxson
2008	Prairie Fever	Charlie

== TV ==
Year	Film	Role
1984	Murder, She Wrote	
1988	The Golden Girls	
1989	Paradise	
1990	Elvis	Bill Black
1991	Baywatch	
1992, 1994 - 1996	Baywatch Nights	
1993	Dr. Quinn, Medicine Woman	Drew
1997	Seinfeld	Lyle
1999	The Pretender	
2000	Any Day Now	
2001	Charmed	
2002–12, 2014	General Hospital	Coleman Ratcliffe
2003	Hollywood Homicide	
2005	Dependency	
2006	The O.C.	
2006	CSI: Miami	Rick Miller
2006	A.I. Assault	
2006	You and I	
2008	Dexter	Clemson Galt
2009	The Mentalist	
2010	Modern Family	
2010	Chase	
2010	Castle	
2010	NCIS: Los Angeles	
2012	The Young and the Restless	Eddie G.
2013	Criminal Minds	
2013	Supernatural	Sonny
2025	Leanne	Dylan

== Commercials ==
- Pepsi (2002)
- Michelin (2003)
- Subaru Outback (2009)
- Miracle Whip (2010)
- Dr Pepper 10 (2013)
- Geico "cheat death" (2017)
- AT&T "stay in your lane bro" tattoo artist (2018)

== See also ==
- History Of General Hospital
- List of General Hospital characters
