= Mary (2019 film) =

- Theatrical release poster
- Directed by: Michael Goi
- Written by: Anthony Jaswinski
- Produced by: Scott Lambert; D. Scott Lumpkin; Mason McGowin; Alexandra Milchan; Tucker Tooley
- Starring: Gary Oldman; Emily Mortimer; Manuel Garcia-Rulfo; Stefanie Scott; Chloe Perrin; Douglas Urbanski; Jennifer Esposito; Owen Teague
- Cinematography: Michael Goi
- Edited by: Jeff Betancourt
- Music by: The Newton Brothers
- Production companies: Tooley Entertainment; Entertainment One
- Distributed by: RLJE Films
- Release dates: August 24, 2019 (FrightFest); October 11, 2019
- Running time: 84 minutes
- Country: United States
- Language: English
- Box office: $709,528

Mary is a 2019 American supernatural horror film directed and shot by Michael Goi and written by Anthony Jaswinski. It stars Gary Oldman, Emily Mortimer, Manuel Garcia-Rulfo, Stefanie Scott, Chloe Perrin, Douglas Urbanski, Jennifer Esposito, and Owen Teague.

== Plot ==
After being found drifting on the wreckage of a sailing boat and rescued by the Coast Guard, Sarah and her two daughters are taken into police custody. Sarah is interrogated by Detective Clarkson, who Sarah claims will not believe what happened on board the boat. Clarkson asks to hear anyway and Sarah tells her what occurred:

Sarah's husband David, a helmsman on a tourist ferry, impulsively buys a salvaged sailing boat that had been discovered abandoned by the Coast Guard. David intends to take Sarah and their two daughters, teenager Lindsey and ten-year old Mary, on a trip to Bermuda, as a way to strengthen the family's bond after Sarah had an affair. The family restores the ship that is already named Mary, the same name as their youngest daughter. After David christens the boat, Tommy, Lindsey's boyfriend and David's protege, sees a bright flash of light emanate from the boat while taking a photo.

David, Sarah, Mary, Lindsey, Tommy, and David's friend Mike set sail for Bermuda. Mary gains an imaginary friend, a woman she claims lives on the boat, and begins making sinister crayon drawings of her friend. On the first night out, David hears a noise from above deck and investigates. He finds Tommy, who has non-fatally stabbed himself with a knife. Tommy attacks David with the knife and is promptly subdued. David has Tommy confined to a mental institution on the Abaco Islands, and he and Sarah resolve to keep this a secret from the others, which strains Sarah and David's relationship with Lindsey. David later receives word that Tommy hanged himself, much to his horror. Sarah later discovers Mary had drawn a picture of a hangman earlier. Numerous supernatural activities occur, such as footprints mysteriously appearing, Sarah experiencing vivid nightmares, and Sarah being locked inside the cabin and seeing the apparition of a woman.

Tension grows between the crew. Mary smashes a glass on Lindsey's face, and David and Sarah begin to fight constantly, as Sarah wants to turn back while David wants to continue the trip. Sarah and David separately research the history of the boat, and discover that its previous owners had disappeared in similar trips, and all sailed to the same destination; it is implied the boat is possessed by the spirit of a witch who is attempting to replace her children after being drowned.

David and Sarah agree to turn back, and David orders Mike to change course. David hears mysterious noises topside, and discovers Mike, now under the control of the witch, has destroyed the sails, drained the ship of gas, and thrown the satellite phone overboard, and that the boat is caught in a torrential storm. Mike attacks David, but is knocked unconscious and trapped inside one of the cabins. Lindsey sees Tommy's ghost, and is convinced to kill herself by jumping overboard, though she is saved at the last minute by David.

Mike is released from the cabin, and knocks David and Sarah unconscious. Sarah awakens, tied up, and watches as Mike tosses David overboard. Mike does the same to Sarah, but she is able to climb back on board. She attacks Mike, but he gains the upper hand. David, still alive, appears and shoots Mike with a harpoon gun. Mike falls overboard, and Sarah rescues Lindsey and Mary from the cabin she had been locked in. Sarah sends her daughters overboard in life jackets while David steers the boat. Before Sarah can leave, David is killed by the witch, who attacks Sarah. Sarah fires a flare gun at the witch, and causes the boat to explode.

At the police station, Detective Clarkson concludes Sarah is a murderer and delusional, and has her escorted away by a police officer. Clarkson intends to make sure Sarah never gets custody of her daughters. As she checks footage of the interrogation, Clarkson discovers video distortions, and that Sarah is possessed by a witch. Clarkson hears a noise from the room where Sarah had been taken, and discovers the officer who escorted her dead and Sarah gone, having escaped through the window. The final shot reveals that the police station is in the middle of a torrential storm, much like the one that had surrounded the boat.

== Cast ==
- Gary Oldman as David
- Emily Mortimer as Sarah
- Owen Teague as Tommy
- Manuel Garcia-Rulfo as Mike Álvarez
- Jennifer Esposito as Detective Clarkson
- Stefanie Scott as Lindsey
- Chloe Perrin as Mary
- Douglas Urbanski as Jay

== Production ==
In June 2016, Anthony Jaswinski was announced to write the script for the film, with Tucker Tooley producing. In September 2017, it was announced Gary Oldman, Emily Mortimer, Owen Teague, Manuel Garcia-Rulfo, Stefanie Scott and Chloe Perrin had joined the cast of the film, with Michael Goi directing. In August 2018, Jennifer Esposito joined the cast of the film.

== Release ==
In July 2019, RLJE Films acquired distribution rights to the film and set it for release on October 11, 2019.

== Reception ==
The film received largely negative reviews from critics. On the review aggregator Rotten Tomatoes, the film holds an approval rating of 4%, based on 27 reviews, with an average rating of 3.4/10. The consensus reads, "Misguided from stem to stern, Mary wastes the talents of an outstanding cast -- and makes a soggy mess of its supernatural horror story." On Metacritic, the film has a weighted average score of 31 out of 100, based on 12 critics, indicating "generally unfavorable reviews".
