= Ward Weaver III =

American convicted murderer (born 1963)

- Born: Ward Francis Weaver; April 6, 1963 (age 63); Humboldt County, California, U.S.
- Convictions: Aggravated murder (2 counts); Rape; Sexual assault; Attempted murder; Aggravated Assault
- Penalty: Life imprisonment without the possibility of parole

Details
- Victims: 2
- Span of crimes: January 9 – March 8, 2002
- Country: United States
- State: Oregon
- Date apprehended: August 13, 2002

Ward Francis Weaver III (born April 6, 1963) is an American convicted murderer. He is serving a life sentence without the possibility of parole for sexual assault, rape, attempted murder, and the murders of Ashley Pond and Miranda Gaddis in Oregon City, Oregon.

Raised in Northern California by his mother, Weaver had a tumultuous childhood; his father, Ward Weaver II, was convicted in 1984 of a double-murder. After a stint in the U.S. Navy Reserve, Weaver was convicted of assaulting two teenage girls in Fairfield, California in 1988.

In January 2002, 12-year-old Ashley Pond disappeared en route to her bus stop in Oregon City, near Weaver's residence. Two months later, Pond's classmate, 13-year-old Miranda Gaddis, also vanished under mysterious circumstances. The disappearances received international media attention, and were profiled on various television programs, including Unsolved Mysteries. The remains of both girls were discovered on Weaver's property in August 2002 during an investigation into the rape of his son's girlfriend, also committed by Weaver. In 2004, Weaver was sentenced to life without parole for the sexual assault and murder of both girls.

== Early life ==
Weaver was born April 6, 1963, in Humboldt County, California, to Trish and Ward Weaver II. In 1967, his father abandoned the family; several years later, his mother married Bob Budrow, an abusive alcoholic, and the family relocated to Portland, Oregon.

Weaver first exhibited antisocial behavior as a teenager; his sister, Tammi, later said that he physically and sexually abused at least one family member by the time he was 12 years old, and his half-brother, Robert Budrow, claimed that Weaver frequently beat him during their childhood.

In 1981, a teenaged relative reported that he had repeatedly raped and beaten her. Police investigated allegations of abuse in 1981, but Multnomah County prosecutors decided not to pursue charges because Weaver had enlisted in the armed services and would be leaving Portland. Shortly thereafter, Weaver graduated from Marshall High School in Portland, and joined the US Navy Reserve. He was discharged the following year on May 17, 1982, for heavy drinking and dereliction of duty. During his tenure in the Navy, he met his future wife, Maria Stout, a native of the Philippines. The couple moved in with Weaver's parents and she was soon pregnant. Five months into her pregnancy, she was physically assaulted by Weaver and hospitalized, but did not press charges. Their son, Francis, was born in December 1982, though it was later determined that he was not Ward Weaver's biological son.

In 1981, Weaver's father murdered 18-year-old Air Force recruit Robert Radford and his 23-year-old girlfriend Barbara Levoy, whom he also raped. Weaver II found the couple in Tehachapi, California, where their car had broken down. He later buried the victims in his backyard. In 1984, Weaver II was sentenced to death for the crime. He is also a suspected serial killer, being suspected of up to 24 other murders.

=== Marriage and early crimes ===
Weaver married Maria Stout in 1984, and the couple relocated to Bakersfield, California. On June 15, 1986, Weaver attacked the teenaged daughters of a friend in Fairfield, California, striking one of the girls — 15-year-old Jennifer Ordonoa — with a block of concrete. He was sentenced to three years in prison for the assaults. After his release, Weaver and wife Stout relocated to Canby, Oregon, where they operated a store. There, Maria gave birth to their fourth child, Mallori, in 1989.

In 1993, Maria Weaver filed a restraining order against her husband, and their marriage ended in divorce. In July 1995, Weaver beat his new girlfriend, Kristi Sloan, with a cast iron skillet. He was jailed for the incident, but Sloan did not testify against him. By October, they were back together and, in February 1996, they married. The marriage lasted four years.

== Murders of Ashley Pond and Miranda Gaddis ==
=== Disappearances ===
In August 1997, Weaver began an affair with a woman he met at work. The couple moved into a rented house on South Beavercreek Road in Oregon City. Weaver's then-12-year-old daughter Mallori became friends with Ashley Marie Pond (born March 1, 1989) and Miranda Diane Gaddis (born November 18, 1988); the three girls were students at Gardiner Middle School, and were also members of the same dance class. In August 2001, Pond accused Weaver of attempting to rape her at his home, and reported the incident to police; law enforcement did not formally file charges against him.

On the morning of January 9, 2002, Pond left her home at the Newell Creek Village apartments to walk to the nearby bus stop; she never arrived. Friends and family, including Gaddis, began to search for her; Gaddis resided in the same apartment building as Pond. The dance team, of which both girls were members, organized a fundraiser to help assist the search for Pond, which they scheduled for March 23, 2002.

On the morning of March 8, Gaddis disappeared under similar circumstances to Pond. After Gaddis' disappearance, the FBI instated a task force to search for the girls; FBI spokeswoman Beth Anne Steele stated during a press interview: "There is a growing belief that the cases are related, and while there's a slight hope that they have run away, there is a growing belief that there was some kind of criminal activity involved."

After both girls vanished, Weaver (with the help of his son) dug a hole in his yard and covered it with concrete; Weaver told his son it was a pad for a hot tub. KATU television news reporter Anna Song conducted an interview with Weaver prior to his arrest, during which he stood on top of the concrete slab where Ashley Pond was buried. When asked about the slab, Weaver told The Oregonian: "I'm putting in a Jacuzzi. The last time I checked that wasn't against the law." Portland Tribune reporter Jim Redden got two tips early on – one from Linda O'Neal, a private investigator and a relative of Pond – which prompted him to interview Weaver. Weaver told Redden that he was the FBI's prime suspect, at a time when it was generally believed there was no such suspect. During a July 9, 2002 interview with Good Morning America, Weaver commented:

I have no problem with them looking at me as a suspect. The problems are coming with what they're doing as far as questions that are being asked of my family. They're telling parents of my daughter's friends not to let their daughters spend the night, because I'm a prime suspect, and their daughter might be next.

=== Discovery ===
On August 13, 2002, Weaver's stepson, Francis, called police claiming that Weaver had attempted to rape his 19-year-old girlfriend. When speaking to authorities, Francis suggested that his stepfather had been involved in the murders of Pond and Gaddis. Weaver was arrested for the attempted sexual assault, and law enforcement subsequently initiated a warrant to investigate his property. Pond's stepmother, who had suspected Weaver in both disappearances, erected a sign next to the concrete slab on his property which read: "Dig Me Up."

The FBI began a search of Weaver's property on South Beavercreek Road on August 24, 2002. That day, FBI agents discovered Gaddis' remains inside a microwave oven box in a storage shed behind Weaver's home. On August 25, the remains of Pond were unearthed from beneath the concrete slab in Weaver's backyard, where they had been buried in a 55-gallon barrel.

=== Media coverage ===
The disappearances of Pond and Gaddis drew international media attention, (Note: The girls' disappearances and murder cases were publicized in various national media, as well as international publications, such as the BBC.) receiving coverage in The Oregonian, People, The Los Angeles Times, The New York Times, and the BBC. The disappearances were also profiled in an episode of Unsolved Mysteries, which aired on September 20, 2002, after the girls' bodies had been discovered.

Journalist Linda O'Neal went on to co-write a book about the case, entitled The Missing Girls, published in 2006. The book was somewhat fictionalized, featuring composite characters and reconstructed conversations. O'Neal contended that the substance of the book was accurate, but the FBI criticized the book, and took exception to O'Neal's characterization of how the case was solved.

=== Conviction and aftermath ===
In 2002, Governor John Kitzhaber launched a multi-agency investigation into the handling of the first report of Weaver's abuse of Pond. Weaver remained under arrest for the attempted rape of his son's girlfriend until October 2, 2002, when he was indicted and charged with six counts of aggravated murder; two counts of abuse of a corpse in the second degree; one count of sexual abuse in the first degree; one count of attempted rape in the second degree; one count of attempted aggravated murder; one count of first degree attempted rape; one count of sexual abuse in the first degree; one count of sexual abuse in the second degree; and two counts of sexual abuse in the third degree. In September 2004, Weaver pleaded guilty to two charges and no contest to the rest. A plea bargain allowed him to avoid the death penalty. He was sentenced to two life sentences without parole.

On March 4, 2007, Weaver was walking to the barber shop at the Snake River Correctional Institution for a haircut when the barber – another inmate – revealed a makeshift knife and attacked him, causing neck and shoulder injuries. He was treated at the prison. The barber was placed in the disciplinary unit.

In 2009, Gaddis' younger sister, Miriah, visited Weaver in prison on two occasions: "I had to know what happened. It was the only way I could put it behind me," she told reporters. During the visits, Weaver admitted to murdering Pond and Gaddis "with his bare hands," and told Miriah that he had planned to murder her next.

On February 17, 2014, Weaver's stepson Francis was arrested and charged with murder. He and three others had robbed and killed 43-year-old Edward Spangler in Canby, Oregon the day prior. Francis Weaver was convicted of murder in 2016, though it was later reduced to manslaughter. Francis' three accomplices were also convicted for their roles in the killing. Michael Orren was sentenced to life in prison for aggravated murder. Shannon Betancourt and Brittany Endicott were sentenced to 7 1/2 years for first degree robbery.

== Media ==
=== Film ===
- The 2011 film Megan Is Missing is loosely based upon the murders of Pond and Gaddis.

== Works cited ==
- Cornwell, Nancy C. (2004). Freedom of the Press: Rights and Liberties Under the Law. ABC-CLIO. ISBN 978-1-851-09471-4.
- Geberth, Vernon J. (2014). Sex-Related Homicide and Death Investigation: Practical and Clinical Perspectives (Second ed.). CRC Press. ISBN 978-1-439-82656-0.
- Gottlieb, Glenn (2002). Wanted: The World's Most Sought After Fugitives. Platinum Press. ISBN 978-1-879-58260-6.
- O'Neal, Linda; Watson, Rick; Tennyson, Philip (2007). The Missing Girls: A Shocking True Story of Abduction and Murder. Macmillan. ISBN 978-0-312-94161-1.
- Schram, Pamela J.; Tibbetts, Stephen G. (2017). Introduction to Criminology: Why Do They Do It? (Second ed.). SAGE Publications. ISBN 978-1-506-34755-4.
