= The Lathe of Heaven =

1971 science fiction novel by Ursula K. Le Guin

- Cover of the first edition (hardcover)
- Author: Ursula K. Le Guin
- Language: English
- Genre: Science fiction
- Publisher: Charles Scribner's Sons
- Publication date: 1971
- Publication place: New York City, New York, United States
- Media type: Print (Hardcover and Paperback)
- Pages: 184
- Awards: Locus Award for Best Novel (1972)
- ISBN: 978-0-684-12529-9
- OCLC: 200189

The Lathe of Heaven is a 1971 science fiction novel by American writer Ursula K. Le Guin, first serialized in the American science fiction magazine Amazing Stories. It won the 1972 Locus Award for Best Novel and was a finalist for the 1971 Nebula Award for Best Novel and 1972 Hugo Award for Best Novel. Two television film adaptations were released: the 1980 PBS production The Lathe of Heaven and Lathe of Heaven, a 2002 remake produced by the A&E Network.

The novel explores themes and philosophies such as positivism, Taoism, behaviorism, and utilitarianism. Its central plot surrounds a man whose dreams are able to alter past and present reality and the ramifications of those psychologically derived changes for better and worse.

== Title ==
The title is from the writings of Chuang Tzu (Zhuang Zhou) – specifically a passage from Book XXIII, paragraph 7, quoted as an epigraph to Chapter 3 of the novel:

知止乎其所不能知，至矣。若有不即是者，天鈞敗之。

Translation:

To let understanding stop at what cannot be understood is a high attainment. Those who cannot do it will be destroyed on the lathe of heaven.

Other epigraphs from Chuang Tzu appear throughout the novel. Le Guin chose the title because she loved the quotation. However, it seems that the quote is a mis-translation of Chuang Tzu's Chinese text.

In Nothingness, Being, and Dao: Ontology and Cosmology in the Zhuangzi, Chai describes the concept of 天鈞 as 'heavenly equilibrium'.

In an interview with Bill Moyers for the 2000 DVD release of the 1980 adaptation, Le Guin clarified the issue:

... it's a terrible mis-translation apparently, I didn't know that at the time. There were no lathes in China at the time that was said. Joseph Needham wrote me and said "It's a lovely translation, but it's wrong".

In 1997, Le Guin published a translation of the Tao Te Ching by Lao Tzu, traditionally regarded as the founder of Taoism (Daoism). In the notes at the end of the translation, she explains her choice of title for the novel:

The language of some [translations of the Tao Te Ching] was so obscure as to make me feel the book must be beyond Western comprehension. (James Legge's version was one of these, although I found the title for a book of mine, The Lathe of Heaven, in Legge. Years later, Joseph Needham, the great scholar of Chinese science and technology, wrote to tell me in the kindest, most unreproachful fashion Legge was a bit off on that one; when Chuang Tzu was written the lathe hadn't been invented.)

Translated editions of Lathe of Heaven titled the novel differently. The German and first Portuguese edition titles, Die Geißel des Himmels and O flagelo dos céus, mean literally "the scourge [or whip] of heaven". The French, Swedish and second Portuguese edition titles, L'autre côté du rêve, På andra sidan drömmen and Do outro lado do sonho, translate as "the other side of the dream". The Italian edition title is La falce dei cieli (The scythe of the heavens)

== Plot summary ==
The book is set in Portland, Oregon, in the year 2002. Portland has three million inhabitants and continuous rain. Many citizens suffer from malnutrition and poverty. The world is seriously affected by war in the Middle East and climate change.

George Orr is a draftsman with a mysterious ability. Some of his dreams are "effective" dreams that change reality. Orr's effective dreams shift the entire universe, changing both the past and present and creating a new timeline. Only Orr remembers that things were ever different, with the exception of people who watch him directly when the dreams occur. Orr begins abusing drugs to suppress his dreams.

Orr begins attending mandated therapy sessions with ambitious psychiatrist and sleep researcher Dr. William Haber. After he witnesses Orr's dreams change a picture in his office, Haber believes in Orr's powers. Dr. Haber seeks to change the planet. Haber's experiments with a biofeedback/EEG machine, nicknamed the Augmentor, enhance Orr's abilities while producing a series of increasingly intolerable alternative worlds based on an assortment of utopian (and dystopian) premises:

- Eliminating over-population is disastrous after Orr dreams that a devastating plague eliminated most humans.
- Attempting to remove the scourge of cancer from society creates a world where citizens are routinely allowed to euthanize one another for being considered a threat to the gene pool.
- "Peace on Earth" results in an alien invasion of the Moon, uniting mankind against the external threat while creating new conflict in cislunar space.

Orr is concerned that Haber is violating his civil rights. He contacts lawyer Heather Lelache, who witnesses one of Haber's therapy sessions. Lelache then gains memories of two different timelines, proving the existence of effective dreaming. Orr tells Lelache that the world was destroyed by nuclear war in April 1998. Orr dreamed it back into existence as he lay dying in the ruins. He now doubts the reality of what now exists, considering it a mere dream.

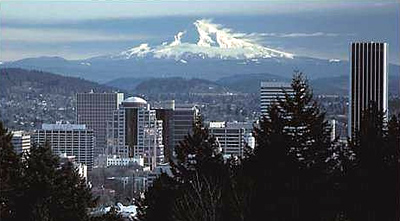
Portland and Mount Hood play a central role in the setting of the novel.

Afraid of the potential harm Haber could do to reality, Orr considers suicide. Lelache suggests that she could hypnotize Orr and try to trigger an effective dream in which Haber is more benevolent. She also suggests to a dreaming Orr that the aliens should no longer be on the Moon. This triggers an unintentional scenario in which the aliens invade Earth and begin attacking.

During this disaster, Orr returns to Haber, who orders Orr to dream of peaceful aliens. For a time, everybody experiences stability, but Haber continues meddling. His suggestion that Orr dream away racism results in everyone becoming gray, and changes much of history: "he had searched his memory and had found in it no address that had been delivered on a battlefield in Gettysburg, nor any man known to history named Martin Luther King". Lelache's parents are different races, which had been noted as a reason for their initial attraction to one another, so she never existed in that alternative reality. Orr dreams a gray version of her with a milder personality; the two marry.

After speaking with one of the aliens, who seem to have a cryptic understanding of effective dreams, Orr confronts Haber. In their final session, Haber "cures" Orr of his ability to dream effectively by suggesting Orr dream that his dreams no longer affect reality. Haber uses his Augmenter to give himself the power to dream effectively. Haber's first effective dream represents a significant break with the various realities created by Orr, and threatens to destroy reality. Despite Orr's efforts to prevent it, the gray Lelache is annihilated by the encroaching chaos. Orr successfully shuts off the Augmentor as coherent existence threatens to dissolve into undifferentiated chaos. The world is saved, but exists now as a mix of random elements from several realities.

In the new reality, Orr works at a kitchen store operated by one of the aliens. Haber survives, his mind shattered by his knowledge of unreality. Lelache is also restored, though she is left with only a slight memory of Orr. Orr is resigned to the loss of the Lelache he loved, but resolves to woo the version of Lelache that exists now. The story ends as the two have coffee, while Orr's inscrutable alien employer observes.

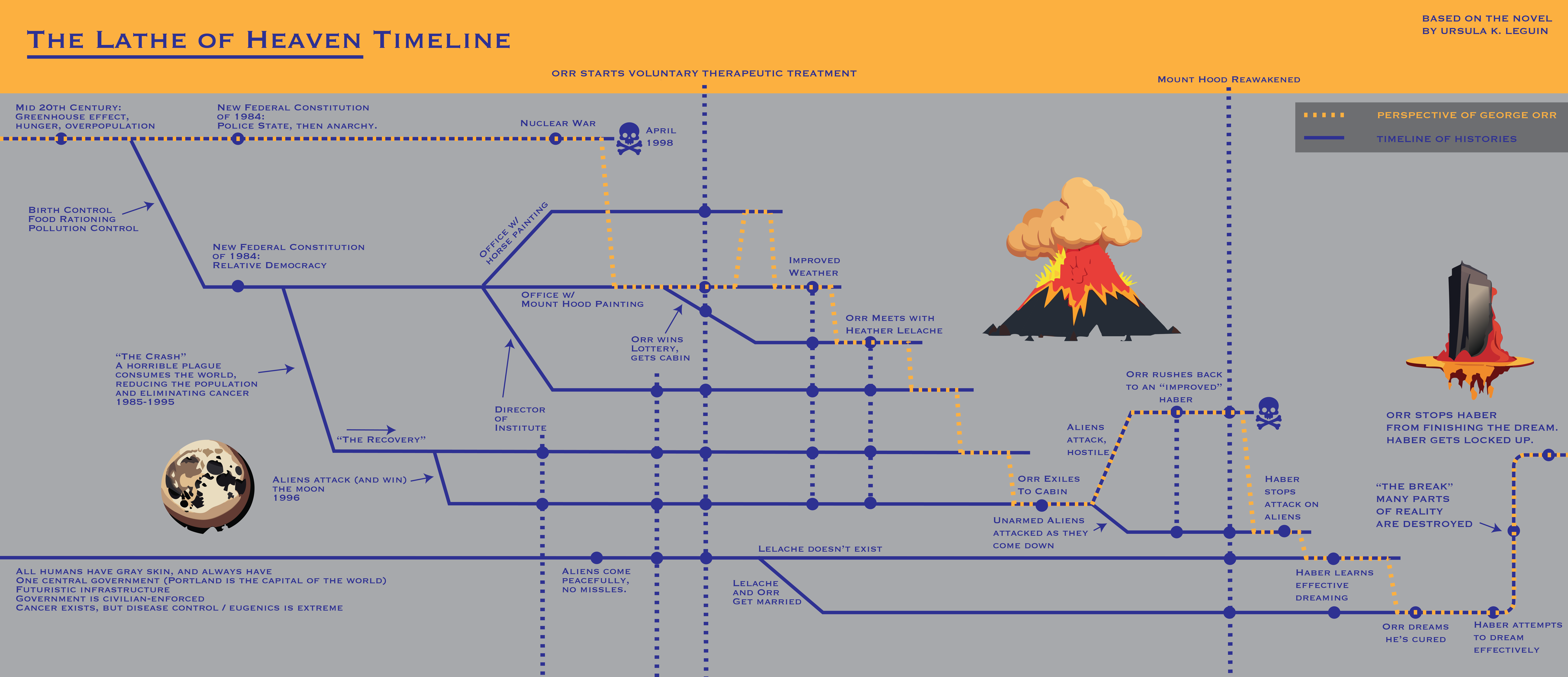
Artist rendition of the plot of The Lathe of Heaven

== Reception ==
Theodore Sturgeon, reviewing Lathe for The New York Times, found it to be "a very good book", praising Le Guin for "produc[ing] a rare and powerful synthesis of poetry and science, reason and emotion". Lester del Rey, however, faulted the novel for an arbitrary and ineffective second half, saying "with wonder piled on wonder, the plot simply loses credibility."

Awards and honors
Year	Award	Category	Result	Ref.
1971	Nebula Award	Novel	Finalist	
1972	Hugo Award	Novel	Finalist	
1972	Locus Award	Novel	Won	

== Viewpoints ==
One of the best novels, and most important to understanding of the nature of our world, is Ursula Le Guin's The Lathe of Heaven, in which the dream universe is articulated in such a striking and compelling way that I hesitate to add any further explanation to it; it requires none.

— Philip K. Dick

Although technology plays a minor role, the novel is concerned with philosophical questions about our desire to control our destiny, with Haber's positivist approach pitted against a Taoist equanimity. The beginnings of the chapters also feature quotes from H. G. Wells, Victor Hugo and Taoist sages. Due to its portrayal of psychologically derived alternative realities, the story is described as Le Guin's tribute to Philip K. Dick. In his biography of Dick, Lawrence Sutin described Le Guin as having "long been a staunch public advocate of Phil's talent". According to Sutin, "The Lathe of Heaven was, by her acknowledgment, influenced by his [Dick's] sixties works."

The book is critical of behaviorism. Orr, a deceptively mild yet very strong and honest man, is labeled sick because he is immensely frightened by his ability to change reality. He is forced to undergo treatment. His efforts to get rid of Haber are viewed as suspect because he is a psychiatric patient. Haber, meanwhile, is very charming, extraverted, and confident, yet he eventually goes insane and almost destroys reality. He dismisses Orr's qualms about meddling with reality with paternalistic psychobabble, and is more concerned with his machine and Orr's powers than with curing his patient.

The book is also critical of the philosophy of utilitarianism, satirizing the phrase "The Greatest Happiness for the Greatest Number." It is critical of eugenics, which it suggests would be a key feature of a culture based on utilitarian ethics.

The book also the explores the negative consequences of the will to power in Haber's philosophy.

It has been suggested that Le Guin named her protagonist "George Orr" as an homage to British author George Orwell, as well as to draw comparisons between the dystopic worlds she describes in Lathe and the dystopia Orwell envisioned in his novel 1984. It might also have the additional meaning either / or.

== Adaptations ==
An adaptation titled The Lathe of Heaven, produced by the public television station WNET, and directed by David Loxton and Fred Barzyk, was released in 1980. It was the first direct-to-TV film production by Public Broadcasting Service (PBS) and was produced with a budget of $250,000. Generally faithful to the novel, it stars Bruce Davison as George Orr, Kevin Conway as William Haber, and Margaret Avery as Heather Lelache. Le Guin was heavily involved in the production of the 1980 adaptation, and expressed her satisfaction with it several times.

PBS's rights to rebroadcast the film expired in 1988, and it became the most-requested program in PBS history. Fans were extremely critical of WNET's supposed "warehousing" of the film, but the budgetary barriers to rebroadcast were high: The station needed to pay for and clear rights with all participants in the original program; negotiate a special agreement with the composer of the film's score; and deal with The Beatles recording excerpted in the original soundtrack, "With a Little Help from My Friends", which is an integral plot point in both the novel and the film. A cover version replaces the Beatles' own recording in the home video release.

The home video release is remastered from a video tape of the original broadcast. PBS, anticipating that the rights issues would beset the production forever, did not save a copy of the film production in their archives.

A second adaptation was released in 2002 and retitled Lathe of Heaven. Produced for the A&E Network and directed by Philip Haas, the film starred James Caan, Lukas Haas, and Lisa Bonet. The 2002 adaptation discards a significant portion of the plot and some of the characters. Le Guin had no involvement in making the film.

A stage adaptation by Edward Einhorn, produced by Untitled Theater Company #61, ran from June 6 to June 30, 2012, at the 3LD Art + Technology Center in New York City.

== Publication history ==
=== Serialized ===
- Amazing Science Fiction Stories, March 1971 and May 1971.

=== Editions in English ===
- 1971, US, Charles Scribner's Sons, ISBN 0-684-12529-3, hardcover
- 1971, US, Avon Books, ISBN 0-380-43547-0, paperback
- 1972, UK, Victor Gollancz, ISBN 0-575-01385-0, hardcover
- 1974, UK, Panther Science Fiction, ISBN 0-586-03841-8, paperback (reprinted 1984 by Granada Publishing)
- 1984, US, Avon Books, ISBN 0-380-01320-7, paperback (reprinted 1989)
- 1997, US, Avon Books, ISBN 0-380-79185-4, trade paperback
- 2001, US, Millennium Books, ISBN 1-85798-951-1, paperback
- 2003, US, Perennial Classics, ISBN 0-06-051274-1, paperback
- 2008, US, Scribner, ISBN 1-4165-5696-6, paperback
- 2014, US, Diversion Books, ISBN 978-16268126-2-8, eBook
- 2023, US, Scribner, ISBN 978-16680174-0-1, paperback (with new introduction by Kelly Link)

=== Audio recording in English ===
- 1999, US, Blackstone Audio Books, ISBN 0-7861-1471-1

=== Translations ===
- 1971, France: L'autre côté du rêve, Marabout; reprinted in 2002 by Le Livre de Poche, ISBN 2-253-07243-5
- 1974, Germany: Die Geißel des Himmels, Heyne, München, 1974, ISBN 3-453-30250-8
- 1975, Argentina: La rueda del cielo, Grupo Editor de Buenos Aires.
- 1979, Sweden: På Andra Sidan Drömmen, Kindbergs Förlag, ISBN 91-85668-01-X
- 1983, Portugal: O Flagelo dos Céus, Publicações Europa-América
- 1987, Spain: La rueda celeste, Minotauro, Barcelona, 1987; reprinted in 2017 ISBN 978-84-350-0784-9
- 1987, Serbia: Nebeski strug, Zoroaster
- 1991, Finland: Taivaan työkalu, Book Studio, ISBN 951-611-408-3
- 1991, Poland: Jesteśmy snem, Phantom Press, ISBN 83-7075-210-1 & 83-900214-1-2
- 1991, Portugal: Do Outro Lado do Sonho, Edições 70, ISBN 972-44-0784-5
- 1992, Hungary: Égi eszterga, Móra, ISBN 963-11-6867-0
- 1994, Czech Republic: Smrtonosné sny, Ivo Železný, ISBN 80-7116-173-X
- 1997, Russia: Резец небесный
- 2004, Portugal: O Tormento dos Céus, Editorial Presença, ISBN 972-23-3156-6
- 2005, Italy: La Falce dei cieli, Editrice Nord, ISBN 88-429-1360-X
- 2010, Korea: 하늘의 물레.황금가지, ISBN 978-89-6017-242-5
- 2011, Turkey: Rüyanın Öte Yakası, Metis Yayınları, ISBN 978-97-5342-791-3
- 2013, Romania: Sfâșierea cerului, Editura Trei, ISBN 978-973-707-723-3

== See also ==
- Eye in the Sky
- The Futurological Congress
- The Man in the High Castle
- Paprika
- Psychokinesis
- The Monkey's Paw
- The Tombs of Atuan
- Utopian and dystopian fiction
- The Word for World Is Forest
