= Dead Girls (film) =

- Video artwork
- Directed by: Dennis Devine
- Screenplay by: Steve Jarvis
- Produced by: Eugene James
- Starring: Diana Karanikas; Angela Eads; Kay Schaber; Angela Scaglione
- Cinematography: Regge Bulman; Aaron Schneider
- Edited by: Dennis Devine; Steve Jarvis
- Music by: Eric Ekstrand
- Distributed by: Raedon Video
- Release date: September 1, 1990
- Running time: 105 minutes
- Country: United States
- Language: English
- Budget: $100,000

Dead Girls is a 1990 American slasher film directed by Dennis Devine, and starring Diana Karanika, Angela Eads, Kay Schaber, and Angela Scaglione. It follows the members of a female-fronted death metal group who are stalked by a masked killer while vacationing at a mountain cabin. The film was inspired by a lawsuit brought against Ozzy Osbourne, whose song "Suicide Solution" allegedly inspired the 1984 suicide of 19-year-old John Daniel McCollum.

Filmed in Southern California, the film was released direct-to-video in 1990. It marked the first feature film credit of cinematographer Aaron Schneider.

== Plot ==
The Dead Girls are a death metal group consisting of Gina ("Bertha Beirut"), Dana ("Lucy Lethal"), Amy ("Nancy Napalm"), Susie ("Cynthia Slain"), and their male drummer, Dana's brother Mark ("Randy Rot"). Their manager, Arty, is determined to drive the group in a mainstream direction, but they resist his attempts, as they are self-aware of their lack of musical talent; aside from the Juilliard-trained Mark, the girls have relied on on-stage shock value, violent spectacles, and morbid lyrics to draw in their fanbase.

Gina's teenage sister Brooke, along with other devoted fans, engage in a mass suicide which Brooke survives. Gina visits her hometown amidst the funerals, and meets with her childhood friend, Mike. Gina's conservative aunt and uncle blame the band for inspiring Brooke's suicidal ideation. The group decide to take a two-week vacation to a remote cabin so that Gina can mentally recover. Gina brings Brooke, much to her aunt and uncle's reluctance, along with their assistant Jeff, and a nurse overseeing Brooke's recovery. Before the group depart, Arty is murdered in his office by a skull-masked killer.

Upon arriving at the cabin, the group are met by Elmo, a developmentally-disabled handyman who oversees the property's maintenance. Mark covertly brings a female groupie to the property, but the girls force her to leave after finding him having sex with her. While wandering away from the property in the woods, the groupie is murdered by the masked killer. The next day, Susie is attacked and drowned in the lake, and Gina discovers her body. She phones the police, but Susie's body disappears and the sheriff believes the women are pulling a stunt. Amy suspects that Susie is pulling a prank, as she has regularly performed fake deaths during the band's live concerts.

In the morning, Gina realizes Jeff is missing, and she and Amy discover Susie and Jeff's corpses in a barn on the property. Gina flees, attempting to stop the nurse, who is departing in the group's van to bring Brooke for a hospital visit; however, she does not make it in time, leaving the group stranded at the cabin. Gina tries to phone the police, but finds the phone lines have been cut. The group begins to turn on each other, with Dana accusing Gina and Amy of being responsible for the murders.

Amy, a military combat enthusiast, goes to set traps in the barn, hoping to catch the killer. Meanwhile, Dana reconciles with Gina, presenting evidence suggesting that Mark is the killer. Amy is attacked in the woods by the killer, who dismembers her with an axe. Shortly after, Mark returns to the cabin having gathered firewood. At Dana's urging, Gina sets out to leave the property on foot, only to stumble upon Amy's corpse. Armed with Amy's gun, Gina returns to the cabin. There, she finds Dana bound and gagged, and is confronted by Mark, brandishing a pistol. Gina kills Mark, after which Dana reveals that she and Mark had planned to murder Gina and Amy, fearing they were responsible for the killings and conspiring against them. Before Dana can enact her revenge, the masked killer appears and slashes her throat.

Gina flees into the woods, with the killer closely pursuing her. Elmo appears, and Gina assumes him to be the killer. Moments later, Mike, who has been unable to contact Gina, arrives, and bludgeons Elmo to death. Gina presumes she is finally safe, before Mike reveals he is in fact the murderer, driven by his extreme religious views and his belief that the band are promoting evil. Mike binds and gags Gina in the barn, which is now full of all his victims' corpses, but inadvertently trips Amy's potassium nitrate bomb, killing himself.

Shortly after, the nurse returns to the cabin with Brooke and suspects the band have left unannounced. While Brooke waits in the van, the nurse finds Gina bound and gagged inside the barn. Disgusted by the group and believing they have indulged in a sadistic game that resulted in them killing each other, the nurse chooses to depart with Brooke, leaving Gina in the barn to die.

== Cast ==
- Diana Karanikas as Gina Vorelli ("Bertha Beirut")
- Angela Eads as Dana ("Lucy Lethal")
- Kay Schaber as Amy ("Nancy Napalm")
- Angela Scaglione as Susie ("Cynthia Slain")
- Steven Kyle as Mark ("Randy Rot")
- Jeff Herbick as Jeff
- David Chatfield as Mike
- Ilene Singer as Brooke
- David Williams as Elmo
- Deirdre West as Nurse

== Production ==
=== Development ===
Dennis Devine based the idea for the film on the 1985 lawsuit brought against Ozzy Osbourne, whose song "Suicide Solution" inspired the 1984 suicide of 19-year-old John Daniel McCollum in Riverside, California. Screenwriter Steven Jarvis was influenced by Italian giallo films while writing the screenplay.

=== Filming ===
Principal photography took place in California's Antelope Valley and near Lake Elizabeth, as well as in the cities of Lancaster, Tehachapi, and Palmdale. Filming occurred over a two-week period on a budget of approximately $100,000. Devine described the shoot as the most difficult in his career due to logistical issues, including an unexpected snowstorm that compromised the production.

== Release ==
The film was released on VHS by Raedon Video in 1990. Vinegar Syndrome released the film on Blu-ray for the first time as part of their Homegrown Horrors: Volume II set in 2022, alongside Moonstalker and Hanging Heart (both 1989).

== Sources ==
- Henderson, Brad, prod. (2022). "Dead Girls Rock": Looking Back at Dead Girls (Documentary produced for Blu-ray release). Vinegar Syndrome.
- Lindenmuth, Kevin J. (2002). The Independent Film Experience: Interviews with Directors and Producers. Jefferson, North Carolina: McFarland. ISBN 978-0-786-41075-0.
- Weldon, Michael (1996). The Psychotronic Video Guide To Film. New York: Macmillan. ISBN 978-0-312-13149-4.
