= Hanging Heart (film) =

- German poster
- Directed by: Jimmy Lee
- Written by: Jimmy Lee
- Produced by: Michael J. White
- Starring: Barry Wyatt; Jake Henry; Francine Lapensée
- Cinematography: Silvio Santini
- Edited by: Steven Nielson
- Music by: Eric Ekstrand; Nathan Wang
- Production company: Mod Sync Films
- Distributed by: Omega Entertainment
- Release date: January 13, 1989 (Los Angeles)
- Running time: 103 minutes
- Country: United States
- Language: English

Hanging Heart is a 1989 (Note: Some sources erroneously list the film as a 1983 production; however, its copyright registration year as shown in the end credits is 1989. Furthermore, its producer, Michael J. White, confirmed the film was shot in the summer of 1988.) American slasher film written and directed by Jimmy Lee, and starring Barry Wyatt, Jake Henry, and Francine Lapensée. Its plot follows a stage actor who is arrested for his girlfriend's murder, followed by a series of similar slayings, while he is defended by a benefactor and attorney who is romantically obsessed with him.

== Plot ==
Denny is a struggling stage actor in Los Angeles who performs in an experimental theater group. Elliot Scott, a wealthy gay attorney, is enamored of Denny, and allows him to rent a room in his house, as well as bestowing him with lavish gifts, including an expensive car which Denny refuses to take. After Denny and his girlfriend, fellow actress Cathy, have sex in the theater, a cloaked figure with a black wig strangles her to death.

Denny is arrested and booked in the local jail for Cathy's murder, forcing Joanne to recast Denny's role in their forthcoming play, giving the part to the ambitious but drug-addicted Richard. Meanwhile, Elliot agrees to represent Denny as his defense attorney and posts his bail. A recess is ordered for Denny's trial as the prosecution attempts to gather further evidence. During the recess, Denny has dreams in which Elliot makes sexual advances toward him, attempting to perform oral sex on Denny in the shower. Later, Joanne finds Denny alone in the theater donning a black wig, in a catatonic state. The two have sex, after which Joanne is strangled to death in the same manner as Cathy.

Joanne's murder is again attributed to Denny, who is incarcerated in a psychiatric hospital. In therapy sessions, Denny experiences flashbacks to being sexually abused by his stepfather, and the subsequent unresolved strangling death of his mother. A psychiatrist treating Denny testifies on his behalf in court, while Richard testifies for the prosecution, accusing Denny of hating women. The psychiatrist's testimony results in Denny being allowed bail during the trial, which is again paid by Elliot.

Julie, one of Denny's friends and fellow actors who moonlights as an escort, expresses empathy for him, which is observed in a local bar by Detective McGill, who is attempting to prove Denny's guilt. Later that night, Richard breaks into Julie's home and threatens her. On a critical day of the trial, Denny runs late to the courthouse and is struck by a car, which Julie witnesses. Julie tends to Denny in the hospital, and forms a romantic bond with him. After convalescing, Denny attempts to unravel the identity of the killer, believing he has been framed. He subsequently learns that the car accident was set up by McGill, which Julie reluctantly helped orchestrate, as McGill was blackmailing her for her escorting.

Richard attacks Julie at the local bar, but Denny comes to her aid. A fight breaks out between Richard and Denny, but Elliot arrives and stops Denny. Denny flees the scene with Julie, and the two hide out in the theater. There, Julie is attacked by the disguised assailant, but Denny stops the perpetrator, who is revealed to be Elliot, who has been murdering Denny's female sexual partners out of his lust for him. Elliot is arrested for the crimes, and sits idly in a jail cell.

== Cast ==
- Barry Wyatt as Denny Curtis
- Jake Henry as Elliot Scott
- Francine Lapensée as Julie
- John Stevens as Richard
- Valerie Swift as Joanne Dixon
- Dan Zukovic as George McGill
- Debra Robinson as Cathy Andrews
- Roger Rodd as Chuck
- Ingrid Vold as the Psychiatrist
- Elliot Goldwag as Judge Joesph Esworthy

== Production ==
The film was written and produced by Jimmy Lee, a Korean emigrant to the United States who was studying film at Columbia College Hollywood. Filming took place over four weeks in the summer of 1988 in Los Angeles. Some filming occurred at the Lincoln Heights Jail in Lincoln Heights, Los Angeles. Additional photography, including some of the courtroom and prison locations, where shot on sets in Culver City that had previously been used in the film Escape from Alcatraz (1979)

== Release ==
The film had a premiere screening on January 13, 1989, at the Darryl F. Zanuck Theater at 20th Century Fox studios.

It was sold for international distribution through Omega Entertainment, but did not receive a release in the United States. Vinegar Syndrome released the film on Blu-ray for the first time as part of their Homegrown Horrors: Volume II set in 2022, alongside Moonstalker (1989) and Dead Girls (1990).
