= Lucifer's Women =

- Directed by: Paul Aratow
- Screenplay by: Paul Aratow; Cecil Brown
- Based on: Trilby by George du Maurier
- Starring: Larry Hankin; Jane Brunel-Cohen; Norman Pierce; Paul Thomas; Clair Dia
- Cinematography: Robbie Greenberg
- Edited by: David Webb Peoples
- Music by: Ed Bogas
- Distributed by: Constellation Films, Inc.
- Release date: December 18, 1974
- Country: United States
- Language: English

Lucifer's Women is a 1974 American exploitation horror film directed by Paul Aratow and starring Larry Hankin, Jane Brunel-Cohen, Norman Pierce, and Paul Thomas. Its plot follows John Wainright, an acclaimed writer-turned-illusionist who, after researching the occult, comes to find he is a reincarnation of Svengali; he subsequently comes to assist his publisher, Stephen, in courting Trilby, a naive nightclub dancer, to become a human sacrifice in Stephen's Satanic cult.

Loosely based on the 1894 George du Maurier novel Trilby, the film was completed in 1974, and premiered theatrically under the alternate title Svengali the Magician in December 1974 in San Francisco. It was later released as Lucifer's Women in 1977.

In 1978, director Al Adamson salvaged footage from the film and reworked it into an entirely different feature titled Doctor Dracula, which starred John Carradine. The media label Vinegar Syndrome released Lucifer's Women on Blu-ray in 2018, marking the film's first home video release. Prior to this, Lucifer's Women had been thought to be a lost film.

== Plot ==
In 1954, Dr. John Wainright, a former academic-turned-illusionist, publishes a book about reincarnation in which he espouses to be the mesmerist Svengali, reincarnated. John's publisher, Sir Stephen, reveals to him privately that he himself is the reincarnation of the leader of the Society of the Bleeding Rose, a Satanic cult. Stephen convinces John that he is there to replenish the cult's psychic energy via human sacrifice: The intended goal of the ritual is to transfer Stephen's soul into the body of the sacrificed individual during a double suicide; their deaths must occur at the moment of orgasm for the transference to work.

John initially picks up Mary, a prostitute, and kidnaps her to indoctrinate her into the cult, making her a slave to Satan. He subsequently attempts to court Trilby, a naive and virginal exotic dancer whom he encountered at a nightclub where he performs his illusionist act. Meanwhile, Trilby's drug-addicted prostitute roommate, Barbara, and her pimp, Roland, have simultaneously planned to seduce Trilby, as they are both enchanted by her beauty. Trilby begins to grow suspicions of John's intentions with her. Later, Barbara and Roland convince Trilby to engage in a threesome. John arrives and interrupts the sexual encounter, and Roland insults him. John stares into his eyes, apparently putting him under a spell. Shortly after, Roland is hit and killed by a moving car while crossing a street.

Through a series of supernatural experiences in which he communes with Svengali, John comes to find that Trilby is a source of eternal energy—a goddess—and the Svengali is bent on using her for the benefit of the cult. John begins to regret his involvement, but the spirit of Svengali threatens him. John, who feels legitimate affection for Trilby, flees to the nightclub to warn her. In her dressing room, John informs Trilby that he caused Roland's death, and that it will not be safe for her to be around him, as he—under the possession of Svengali—will murder her. Trilby is impervious to his claims, and suspects he has taken hallucinogens.

After she leaves the nightclub, Trilby finds John—possessed by Svengali—sitting in the back seat of her car. He stares into her eyes, causing her to fall into a spell. That night, John stages a magic show at a high society party, performing his sawing-in-half act on Mary. The same night, the cult holds their ritual in a large mansion, using the kidnapped Trilby. The ritual culminates in Stephen and Trilby having sex on an altar, Trilby brandishing a knife to stab Stephen at the moment of orgasm. During the ritual, Mary suddenly grows jealous of Trilby, and expresses possessiveness over Stephen, her master; she interjects, and stabs Stephen herself before committing suicide.

With the ritual failed, Svengali departs John's body. John, now freed of the burden, flees the house with Trilby. From a balcony, the spirits of Svengali, Mary, and Stephen laugh and watch.

== Cast ==
- Larry Hankin as Dr. John Wainwright / Svengali
- Jane Brunel-Cohen as Trilby
- Norman Pierce as Sir Stephen Phillips
- Paul Thomas as Roland (as Philip Toubus)}
- Tweed Morris as Barbara
- Clair Dia as Mary (as Emily Smith)
- Vic Kirk as Bob
- Robert W. Carr as Jeremy
- Michael Renner as Sergeant Leca
- Noel Welch as Butterfly Dancer

== Release ==
The film premiered in San Francisco on December 18, 1974, under the title Svengali the Magician. It was subsequently re-released in 1977 under the better-known title, Lucifer's Women, screening in Seguin, Texas on July 27, 1977.

=== Critical response ===
Jeanne Miller of The San Francisco Examiner panned the film as a failure "on every level," criticizing it for its focus on exploitation and sex over its horror elements.

=== Doctor Dracula (1978) ===
In 1978, director Al Adamson salvaged footage from Lucifer's Women, reworking it into the separate feature Doctor Dracula, starring John Carradine. As a result, Doctor Dracula shares some cast members and sequences with Lucifer's Women, though it features a different plot.
