= Archie Forbes =

British colonial administrator (1913–1999)

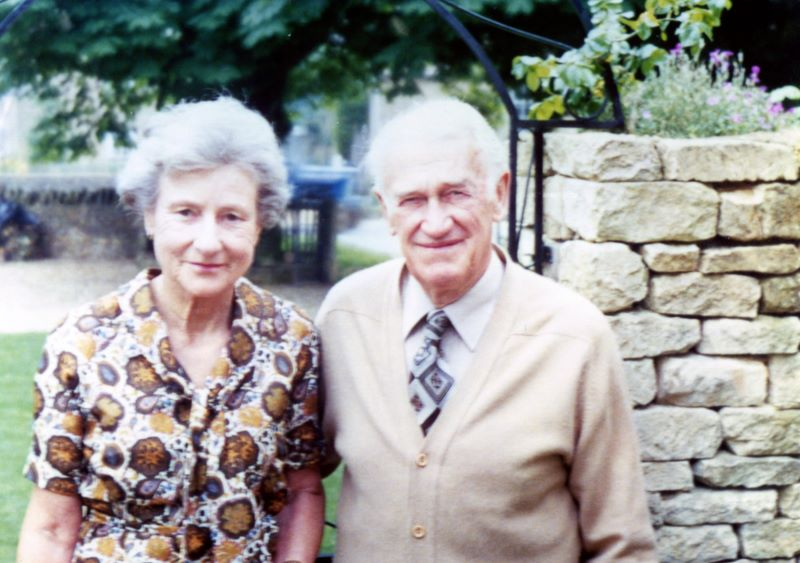
Archie Forbes and his wife

Archibald Peter Sturrock Forbes CBE (5 May 1913 – 27 January 1999) was a Scottish colonial officer who was the Permanent Secretary of the Ministry of Agriculture and Cooperative Development in Tanganyika (now Tanzania).

== Biography ==
Forbes was born in Delwood, Saskatchewan, Canada, the son of Elizabeth Lilian Forbes (née Campbell) and Alexander Menzies Forbes. His family moved to Scotland and he was educated at George Heriot's School in Edinburgh. He studied for a BSc at the University of Edinburgh, then going on to Trinity College, Cambridge to take a Diploma in Agriculture, and finally the Imperial College of Tropical Agriculture in Trinidad and Tobago (Trop Ag).

He also worked with Oxfam between 1963 and 1985, serving as a Trustee and Member of the Administration Committee.

== Colonial service ==
He joined the Colonial Service and in 1937 became an agriculture officer in Nyasaland. He was promoted to Senior Agriculture Officer in 1946, becoming Chief Agriculture Officer in 1953. During this time he worked on the Tanganyika Groundnut Scheme. He became deputy director of Agriculture in 1954, Director of Agriculture in 1958, and Permanent Secretary of the Ministry of Agriculture and Cooperative Development in 1960. In the same year, he was appointed CBE.

When Tanganyika achieved independence in 1963, he undertook consultancy work in Africa and Asia until 1978. He consulted for the World Bank, the Food and Agricultural Organisation, the United Nations, Nordic Engineering and natural resources technology firms.

== Personal life ==
He married Mary Manning (daughter of Captain Robert William Manning) on 10 June 1939. Together they had two children. His daughter Heather was married to Peter Loxton, son of Bill Loxton. He died in 1999 in Winfrith Newburgh, Dorset.
