= Doctor Dracula =

- Directed by: Paul Aratow, Al Adamson
- Written by: Paul Aratow; Cecil Brown; Gary Reathman
- Produced by: Edward H. Margolin
- Starring: John Carradine; Don Barry; Larry Hankin; Geoffrey Land; Regina Carrol
- Cinematography: Gary Graver; Robbie Greenberg
- Edited by: Michael Bockman; Michael Bourne; David Webb Peoples
- Music by: Mary Berstein
- Release date: March 1978
- Running time: 88 mins
- Country: USA
- Language: English

Doctor Dracula is a 1978 TV horror film directed by Al Adamson, featuring John Carradine. According to the Vinegar Syndrome website, who released a DVD version in 2018, the film is a "schizoid reworking" of Paul Aratow's Lucifers's Women.

== Plot ==
John Wainwright is a best-selling author and magician who claims he is the reincarnation of Svengali. He uses his skills as a hypnotist to take control of women. He starts to practice black magic.

== Cast ==
- John Carradine as Hadley Radcliff
- Don Barry as Elliot
- Larry Hankin as Wainwright
- Geoffrey Land as Gregorio
- Susan McIver as Stephanie
- Regina Carrol as Valerie
- Jane Brunel-Cohen as Trilby

== Production ==
The film uses footage from Lucifers's Women in addition to newly scenes shot by Adamson, with production by Sam Sherman: as a result, Doctor Dracula (90' long while Lucifer's Women had almost the same duration, with 91') comprises less sexual explicit content than Aratow's film but offers more aspects of a standard horror film.

== Reception ==
The film is generally reviewed in comparison with the film it derives from and one of these reviews states: "Both Lucifer’s Women and Doctor Dracula have their advantages, but neither one is able to live up to their intriguing titles."
