= Megan Is Missing =

2011 horror film directed by Michael Goi

- Theatrical poster
- Directed by: Michael Goi
- Written by: Michael Goi
- Produced by: Mark Gragnani
- Starring: Amber Perkins; Rachel Quinn; Dean Waite; Jael Elizabeth Steinmeyer; Kara Wang
- Cinematography: Keith Eisberg; Josh Harrison
- Edited by: Michael Goi
- Production company: Trio Pictures
- Distributed by: Anchor Bay Films
- Release date: May 3, 2011
- Running time: 89 minutes
- Country: United States
- Language: English
- Budget: $30,000–35,000

Megan Is Missing is a 2011 American found footage psychological horror film written, directed, edited, and co-produced by Michael Goi. The film stars Amber Perkins, Rachel Quinn, and Dean Waite. The plot follows a troubled teenage girl, Megan (Quinn), who begins talking online with a stranger, Josh (Waite), who claims to be a 17-year-old boy. After meeting him, Megan vanishes, and her friend Amy (Perkins) launches an investigation into her disappearance.

Goi based the film on a series of real-life cases of child abduction. Child advocate Marc Klaas, father of murder victim Polly Klaas, notably endorsed the film. In the early 2000s, Goi became disillusioned by frequent news reports of missing children cases and wanted to raise awareness through his career as a filmmaker. Goi envisioned the film as a low-budget independent feature and self-financed it with a production budget of $30,000–35,000. Goi wrote the script in 10 days and shot the film over a week. Because of the graphic content, he requested that the young cast's parents be on set during filming so they were fully aware of their involvement in the project. It did not find distribution until Anchor Bay Films gave it a limited theatrical release in 2011.

The film was controversial upon its release. Marketed as an educational film, Megan Is Missing was banned in New Zealand. While some critics have highlighted the characterization of Megan and Amy and the film’s initial exploration of their inner struggles, the film’s ending has frequently been criticized for its graphic depiction of rape and its brutal imagery. It is one of the first computer screen films.

The film experienced renewed popularity in 2020 after clips were shared on TikTok. Goi later issued public warnings to prospective viewers after many users began calling the film "traumatizing." Entertainment Weekly called it "2011's scariest horror film." On November 1, 2026, Goi released a sequel vertical series titled Megan Is Missing: Evil Never Dies on Instagram and TikTok. It features Quinn and Perkins returning as fictionalized versions of themselves.

== Plot ==
Megan Stewart and Amy Herman are 14-year-old best friends from North Hollywood who went missing in January 2007. An unidentified, seemingly tech-savvy and omniscient narrator has assembled web-chat recordings, home movies, news reports and previously classified police material into a linear narrative of the weeks surrounding their disappearances. Whether this compiled documentary is meant to be a cautionary tale about online safety, or rather something more sinister, is left open to speculation.

Despite their friendship, the two girls share little in common. Megan is a popular high school honors student, but she also has a dysfunctional relationship with her mother who has a reckless and promiscuous sex life and a drug addiction. Amy, on the other hand, lives in Sherman Oaks, has a healthy relationship with her parents, is still a virgin and enjoys stuffed toys.

This friendship does not exempt Amy from bullying by Megan's friends. To help her fit in, Megan invites Amy to a rave party. Amy's experience in the party is unpleasant all round: she is slapped after refusing the advances of a male attendee, walks in on Megan performing fellatio on the party's host, and vomits on Megan's bisexual friend Lexie while she is making out with another girl.

Megan later assuages Amy's feelings of shame and inadequacy regarding the party, and explains that she first performed oral sex at age 10 with a 17-year-old camp counselor. On her birthday, Amy records a video diary with Megan on her new camera, during which Megan reveals that her stepfather had raped her at the age of nine, and continued to do so for two years, which led to his imprisonment and her self-destructive lifestyle. Her mother resents her for reporting him to authorities, which leads to their volatile relationship. Amy quickly hugs and comforts Megan.

Megan video chats with Lexie. It is strongly implied during this conversation that they share a brief sexual past and Lexie retains a crush on Megan. Lexie gives Megan's social media handle to Josh, who presents himself as a teenager from a nearby school. He only shares one picture and remains anonymous on video chat, claiming his webcam is broken. Despite several suspicions and contradictions, Megan is charmed by him. They agree to meet at a party, but he fails to reveal himself. She confronts him online but forgives him when he accurately describes what she was wearing and insists he is shy. Later, when Amy comes over to her house, Megan introduces her to him.

Josh convinces Megan to meet him behind a diner. She does not attend class the next day, and Amy's initial inquiries are brushed off by Lexie and her friend Kathy. News reports, however, later declare Megan officially missing. Grainy footage from the diner's security camera shows her being grabbed by the wrist by an indistinct older man. Amy investigates Megan's disappearance and talks online with Josh. Lexie and Kathy notice her investigating in the area where Megan disappeared; perhaps out of guilt for introducing Megan to Josh, Lexie verbally harasses Amy. After realizing Amy suspects him, Josh threatens her. Subsequently, graphic images of Megan immobilized and being tortured in a pillory table surface on a fetish forum.

While recording a video diary underneath an old bridge where she would share secrets with Megan, Amy is grabbed by a man. Investigators find her video camera in a garbage can. In unedited footage, Josh unlocks the door to a torture chamber with Amy chained to the wall. She begs for her teddy bear and he responds by making her eat food from a dog bowl without her hands. Josh later rapes Amy on the table Megan was paralyzed on, then tells her that he will let her go if she gets into a large plastic barrel to conceal his whereabouts. Amy opens the barrel and attempts to flee when she sees Megan's decaying corpse inside. She is forced inside alongside Megan's body and begs to live while Josh digs a large hole in a forest. He pushes the barrel in and fills it up before picking up his flashlight and walking away. The missing posters for Amy and Megan are shown and the film ends. The end credits shows them laying on Amy's bed, talking about their plans for the future.

== Cast ==
- Amber Perkins as Amy Herman
- Rachel Quinn as Megan Stewart
- Dean Waite as Josh
- Jael Elizabeth Steinmeyer as Lexie
- Kara Wang as Kathy
- Brittany Hingle as Chelsea
- Carolina Sabate as Angie
- Trigve Hagen as Gideon
- Curtis Wingfield as Ben
- April Stewart as Joyce Stewart, Megan's mother
- Reyver Huante as Bill Herman, Amy's father
- Tammy Klein as Louise Herman, Amy's mother
- Lauren Leah Mitchell as Callie Daniels
- Kevin Morris as Detective Simonelli

== Production ==
Megan is Missing was made with a low budget, which is part of the reason for the found footage format. Goi self-financed the film as he believed that investors wouldn't fund it due to the violent script. It was shot over a week in 2006 with a small crew of only five people and a budget of $35,000. It had "no motion picture lighting equipment, no grip equipment, no professional sound recording equipment" to have a "raw" and realistic feel to it. The vast majority of the cast were adolescents, and Goi required that their parents be on the set during filming due to the graphic nature of the film.

The majority of the cast were inexperienced or first-time actors. The casting was intentional, as Goi wanted the characters to be portrayed by non-recognizable actors for the film to have an "air of reality." Rachel Quinn, a 17-year-old aspiring actress and dancer, was cast in the eponymous role of Megan Stewart. Amber Perkins, who had previously only done background work for television shows and commercials, was cast in the lead role of Amy Herman. This role marked her feature film debut. The role of the villain, Josh, was given to Australian actor Dean Waite.

In the controversial photographs used in the film, Quinn is legitimately wearing the torture device. Quinn describes wearing the headgear as her worst memory of filming. She attests this is because it was physically uncomfortable and mentally traumatizing when she realized what she was portraying. As the photographs are reality-based, Quinn asked Goi to show her the inspiration behind them. Upon seeing the real-life photographs she was reenacting, she began crying on the set. Quinn spent several hours having the special effects for Megan's corpse reveal applied to her and had to wear oversized white contact lenses that essentially blinded her when shooting in the barrel. Goi was very particular about the makeup direction for Megan's corpse. He wanted the audience to be able to tell that it is her, that she looked realistically dead, and to show that she suffered tremendously in the process of dying.

The basement scenes were challenging for Perkins. Quinn agreed to stay on the set, making it a more comfortable environment for her. Goi has stated that Waite's scenes were difficult to film for the actor. In particular, the rape scene of the Amy character was difficult for him, which required several reshoots. Goi recollects Waite becoming frustrated and cursing upon being told they had to refilm it. The burial scene of Waite digging the large hole in the forest was filmed in real time. Perkins ad libbed most of her dialogue in the barrel.

== Reception ==
Film critic Alexandra Heller-Nicholas deemed the purposeful amateur cinematography as aiding in the film's authentic feel. She notes the graphic photographs of Megan's torture mark the film's tonal shift and that the camera's gaze, belonging to the heroines at the beginning of the film, being turned against them "adds to the horrific revelations." In a positive review for The Leaf-Chronicle (Tennessee), film critic Jamie Dexter compared the film to the Paranormal Activity franchise and The Blair Witch Project (1999) and praised the storyline. Stating, "It took days for me to shake the horrible feeling this movie left in me, but that just means it was effective in what it set out to do—show this real and plausible scenario of how internet predators work." In a negative review for the Oklahoma Gazette, Rod Lott criticized Goi's characterization and handling of Megan and the acting from the rest of the cast.

Beyond Hollywood and DVD Verdict also panned the film, with Beyond Hollywood calling it "majorly disappointing" and DVD Verdict stating that they "[wished] this disc had been missing from the box". HorrorNews.net gave a more positive review, saying that the first portion of the film "really works", although they felt that the final twenty-two minutes "went a little overboard".

Monique Jones of Common Sense Media gave the film a one star out of five. Jones wrote that Goi's intended lesson within the film isn't successful by grisly imagery (as the ending is difficult to watch for some viewers) but by the film's early exploration of different characters' struggles. Beyond the violent conclusion, Jones emphasizes the film's early scenes succeed in pushing for conversations regarding online safety, healthy communication between parents or trusted adult figures and children, and reaching out for help. Jones wrote that it explores character issues in great detail, such as secrecy, a child's (Megan's) disregarded struggles with domestic abuse and trauma stemming from sexual abuse, peer pressure, and careless internet interactions with strangers.

In Horror Films of the 2010s, John Kenneth Muir wrote, "I found myself drawn to these young, open characters and immersed in their frankness and increasingly dire situation. The nihilistic ending, arriving after a stream of some of the roughest torture-type imagery I’ve seen in a horror film, haunted me, and continues to haunt me. So, if I’m judging the effectiveness of this, I can only make a positive assessment." Unlike most reviews that criticize the ending, Muir defended it for not softening its intended message. Muir noted that the film explores more than internet predators through Megan’s history of oversexualization and exploitation and suggests that the character’s self-revictimization causes her to make reckless decisions that ultimately lead to her becoming a victim again.

On the review aggregator website Rotten Tomatoes, 60% of 5 critics' reviews are positive, with an average rating of 4.8/10.

== Controversy ==
The film was controversial upon its limited release due to its graphic and exploitative depiction of violence and rape and the overt sexualization of the fourteen-year-old titular protagonist. Although, some critics have emphasized that Goi succeeds with the film having an impact.

=== Ban in New Zealand ===
In October 2011, New Zealand's Office of Film and Literature Classification banned Anchor Bay's release of this film by classifying it as "objectionable". They claimed that it contained sexual violence and sexual conduct involving young people to such an extent and degree, and in such a manner that if it was released it would be 'injurious to the public good'. They went on to say that it relished in the spectacle of one girl's ordeal, including a three-minute rape scene. They also stated that it sexualized the lives of young teenage girls to a "highly exploitative degree".

== Legacy ==
=== Popular culture and director's warnings ===
In November 2020, the film became a pop culture sensation after it went viral on the video-sharing app TikTok. The platform is where the film has its largest audience since its release. Users began posting their reactions as the film progresses, with many calling it "traumatizing". The hashtag for the film has over 83 million views. After being informed by Perkins that the film had gone viral, Goi later issued a trigger warning for prospective viewers: "Do not watch the movie in the middle of the night. Do not watch the movie alone. And if you see the words 'photo number one' pop up on your screen, you have about four seconds to shut off the movie if you're already kind of freaking out before you start seeing things that maybe you don't want to see". Goi stated that he made the film with the purpose of it being a "wake-up call" to parents but instead it is children who discover the film and make it resurface sporadically. The film later began trending on Twitter. The film was released on Blu-ray on October 26, 2021, via Lionsgate (current owners of the Anchor Bay library).

=== Megan Is Missing: Evil Never Dies ===
A few years after its release, a production company in Mexico approached Goi to make a Spanish language remake of the film with a Mexican cast. Goi declined the offer as he did not want to revisit the grim subject matter. Goi has stated that he has theorized making a sequel but no progress has been made due to there being "no angle" for him to take the story. On November 1, 2026, Goi released a sequel vertical series titled Megan Is Missing: Evil Never Dies as episodes on Instagram and TikTok. The story is set 15 years after the first film. It stars Rachel Quinn and Amber Perkins as fictionalized versions of themselves who become hunted by a deranged man who believes they should have actually died in the film.

== See also ==
- Murders of Ashley Pond and Miranda Gaddis
- Trust – 2010 film by David Schwimmer
