= Bill Loxton =

British Royal Air Force pilot

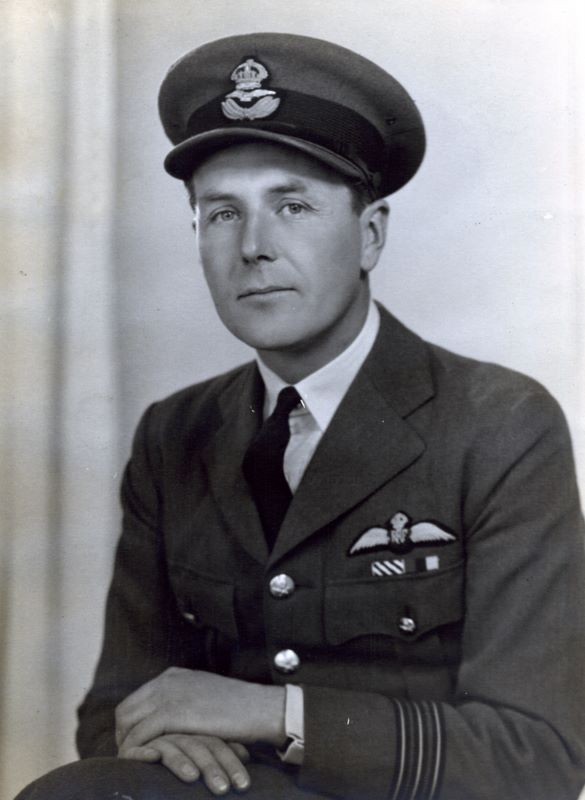
- Wilfrid William (Bill) Loxton
- Born: 20 January 1909; Gretton, Gloucestershire
- Died: 2 November 1992 (aged 83); Puddletown, Dorset
- Military career
- Allegiance: United Kingdom
- Service years: 1928–1933, 1939–1946
- Rank: Squadron leader
- Unit: No. 25 Squadron RAF
- Conflicts: Second World War: Battle of Britain

Wilfrid William Loxton (20 January 1909 – 2 November 1992), known as Bill Loxton, was a British Royal Air Force pilot during the Battle of Britain.

Loxton was born in Gretton, Gloucestershire, the son of Ernest Robert Loxton and Mary Ann Loxton (née Minett). After training as a carpenter, he joined the RAF on 30 April 1930.

Following several promotions, he became Squadron Leader of No 25 Blenheim Squadron (Feriens Tego – Striking I defend). No 25 Squadron was formed at RAF Montrose, on 25 September 1915, as a Fighter/Bomber Squadron equipped with F.E.2bs. The Squadron became a nightfighter unit in 1938; it was re-equipped with Blenheim IFs that year, and also acquired Blenheim Vs equipped with A1 radar. In September 1940 Bristol Beaufighters became available to the Squadron; these were operational on 10 October 1940. The Squadron took part in the Battle of Britain and its pilots joined the ranks of 'the few'.

As a member of 'the few' Loxton is commemorated by name on the Battle of Britain Memorial which was unveiled by Prince Charles and the Duchess of Cornwall on 18 September 2005.

He remained in the RAF until retirement, attaining the rank of Wing Commander. He married Binkie Pattullo on 6 August 1938 and had two sons, Peter and David, who became a well known producer in America. Peter married Heather Loxton; daughter of Archie Forbes.

Loxton is buried, next to his son Peter, in Bere Regis churchyard, Dorset.
