= Aaron Schneider =

American filmmaker and cinematographer (born 1965)

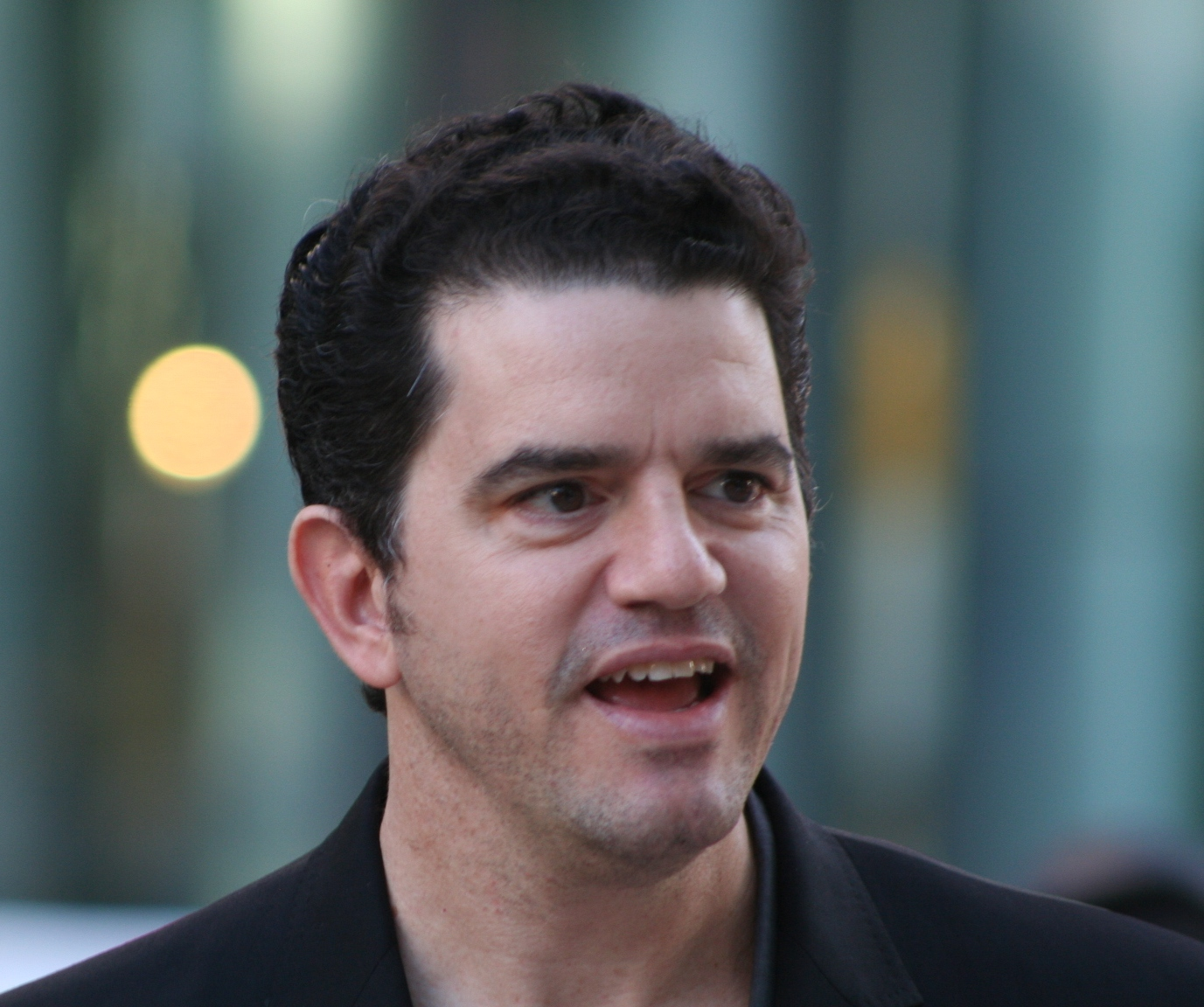
- Schneider at the 2009 Toronto International Film Festival
- Born: July 26, 1965 (age 61); Mossville, Illinois, U.S.
- Occupations: Filmmaker, cinematographer
- Years active: 1990–present
- Known for: Greyhound

Aaron Schneider (born July 26, 1965) is an American filmmaker and cinematographer.

His short film Two Soldiers (2003) won the Academy Award for Best Live Action Short Film. He won an Independent Spirit Award for his feature film debut, Get Low (2009).

== Early life ==
Schneider was born in 1965 in Springfield, Illinois, and raised in Mossville, Illinois. He is a graduate of the University of Southern California. He is of Jewish background, and his father Delwin Schneider was a Korean War veteran.

== Career ==
His cinematography work includes the TV series Murder One (for which he was nominated for a 1996 Emmy Award) and the pilot episode of the series Supernatural, as well as the films Kiss the Girls and Simon Birch. He was also the second unit director of photography for Titanic and second unit director for Final Destination 5.

In 2004, he won the Academy Award for Best Live Action Short Film for the live action short film Two Soldiers (shared with producer Andrew J. Sacks). The 40-minute short was based on a short story written by William Faulkner.

Schneider's first feature film, Get Low, drew positive reviews when it premiered at the 2009 Toronto International Film Festival, and was subsequently purchased for distribution by Sony Pictures Classics. The film was released in the US on July 30, 2010. It stars Robert Duvall in a much-lauded performance, in addition to Sissy Spacek, Bill Murray, and Lucas Black. It earned Schneider the Independent Spirit Award for Best First Feature.

In 2020, after a decade hiatus from features, Schneider directed Greyhound, a World War II drama centered on the Battle of the Atlantic and starring Tom Hanks.

== Filmography ==
=== Cinematographer ===
Film

Year	Title	Director	Notes
1990	Dead Girls	Dennis Devine	With Regge Bulman
1997	Kiss the Girls	Gary Fleder	
1998	Simon Birch	Mark Steven Johnson	

Short film

Year	Title	Director	Notes
2006	Believe	Ray Roderick; Savage Steve Holland; Brent Young	
2024	Little Kidnappers	Cristine Ackel	With John B. Aronson

TV series

Year	Title	Director	Notes
1995-1996	Murder One	Charles Haid; Michael Fresco; Joe Ann Fogle; Nancy Savoca; Jim Charleston; Donna Deitch; Elodie Keene	10 episodes
1997	C-16: FBI	Michael M. Robin	Episode "Pilot" (Part 1 and 2)
1998	Buddy Faro	Charles Haid	Episode "Pilot"
2001	The Agency	Alex Zakrzewski; Mikael Salomon	2 episodes
2004	The D.A.	Michael M. Robin	Episode "The People vs. Sergius Kovinsky"
2004	Beck and Call	Craig Zisk	TV short
2005	Supernatural	David Nutter	Episode "Pilot"

TV movies

Year	Title	Director
1999	Brookfield	Arvin Brown
2002	Miss Miami	Stephen Surjik
2006	Drift	Paul W. S. Anderson
2009	Captain Cook's Extraordinary Atlas	Thomas Schlamme

=== Director ===
Short film

- Two Soldiers (2003) (Also writer and producer)

Feature film

- Get Low (2009) (Also editor)
- Greyhound (2020)
- Greyhound 2 (In production)

Television

Year	Title	Notes
2000	Popular	Episode "Are You There God? It's Me, Ann-Margret"
