= Lathe of Heaven (film) =

2002 film by Philip Haas

- DVD cover
- Genre: Science fiction
- Based on: The Lathe of Heaven by Ursula K. Le Guin
- Written by: Alan Sharp
- Directed by: Philip Haas
- Starring: James Caan; Lukas Haas; Lisa Bonet
- Music by: Angelo Badalamenti
- Country of origin: United States
- Original language: English

Production
- Executive producers: Craig Baumgarten; Allen Sabinson
- Producer: Mark Winemaker
- Production location: Montreal
- Cinematography: Pierre Mignot
- Editor: Jean-François Bergeron
- Running time: 91 minutes
- Production companies: A&E Networks; Alliance Atlantis; Baumgarten Merims Productions

Original release
- Network: A&E
- Release: September 8, 2002

Lathe of Heaven is a 2002 American science fiction television film based on the 1971 novel The Lathe of Heaven by Ursula K. Le Guin, which was previously adapted as a television film in 1980. The film was directed by Philip Haas, written by Alan Sharp, and stars James Caan, Lukas Haas, and Lisa Bonet. It aired on A&E on September 8, 2002. It was nominated at the 29th Saturn Awards for Best Single Program Presentation.

== Synopsis ==
Unlike the 1980 adaptation, this film discards a significant portion of the plot, some minor characters, and much of the philosophical underpinnings of the book. The alien invasion and the racial equalization were removed for this adaptation.

The film takes place in a futuristic society, where a young man named George Orr overdoses using someone else's pharmacy card. Orr is troubled by his dreams, and is implied to be suicidal because of them. He takes drugs to avoid having these dreams. After he is caught overdosing, his attorney Heather Lelache sends him to a psychologist as a punishment.

The psychologist, William Haber, uses a machine called an "augmentor" to delve deep into Orr's mind. The augmentor looks like a dentist's chair. It is soon obvious that Haber has sinister intentions. He begins to hypnotize Orr into dreaming about a horse in a field. When Orr wakes up from his hypnosis-induced dream, an image of Lady Godiva on a horse is now painted on the wall in the office.

Haber then begins to use Orr's power for his own personal gain. At one point, he changes his status from an M.D. to a highly renowned researcher.

== Cast ==
- James Caan as Dr. William Haber
- Lukas Haas as George Orr
- Lisa Bonet as Heather Lelache
- David Strathairn as Mannie
- Sheila McCarthy as Penny
- Serge Houde as Judge

== Production ==
Filming took place in Montreal.
