= Ronald Víctor García =

American cinematographer and film director

Ronald Víctor García is an American cinematographer and film director. He is known for directing 1970s horror and exploitation films, such as The Toy Box and Inside Amy, as well as his later work on television series, including directing Silk Stalkings, and working as the director of photography on series such as Hawaii Five-0, Numb3rs, Gilmore Girls, and the pilot of Twin Peaks. In 1991, García received the CableACE Award for Direction of Photography for a Dramatic or Theatrical Special/Movie or Miniseries for his work on the film El Diablo. In 1992, he was the cinematographer for the Twin Peaks feature film Twin Peaks: Fire Walk with Me. In addition, he received 2 Primetime Emmy Award nominations for other projects and was honored with a lifetime achievement award from the American Society of Cinematographers.
