= The Lathe of Heaven (film) =

1980 film by David Loxton

- Cover of the 2000 video/DVD release of The Lathe of Heaven (1980)
- Genre: Sci-Fi
- Based on: The Lathe of Heaven by Ursula K. Le Guin
- Teleplay by: Roger Swaybill; Diane English
- Directed by: David Loxton; Fred Barzyk
- Starring: Bruce Davison; Kevin Conway; Margaret Avery
- Music by: Michael Small
- Country of origin: United States
- Original language: English

Production
- Executive producer: David Loxton
- Producers: Carol Brandenburg; Fred Barzyk
- Cinematography: Robbie Greenberg
- Editor: Dick Bartlett
- Running time: 105 minutes
- Production companies: Taurus Film; WNET
- Budget: $250,000

Original release
- Release: January 9, 1980

The Lathe of Heaven is a 1980 film adaptation of the 1971 science fiction novel The Lathe of Heaven by Ursula K. Le Guin. It was produced in 1979 as part of New York City public television station WNET's Experimental TV Lab project, and directed by David Loxton and Fred Barzyk. Le Guin, by her own account, was involved in the casting, script planning, rewriting, and filming of the production.

The film stars Bruce Davison as protagonist George Orr, Kevin Conway as Dr. William Haber, and Margaret Avery as lawyer Heather LeLache.

== Plot ==
In Portland, Oregon, in the near future, George Orr is charged with abuse of multiple prescription medications, which he was taking to keep himself from dreaming. Orr volunteers for psychiatric care to avoid prosecution, and is assigned to the care of licensed oneirologist William Haber. Orr's explanation of his drug abuse is incredible: He has known since age 17 that his dreams change reality, and tries to prevent himself from this "effective dreaming" because he fears their effects.

Haber initially considers Orr's fear as a delusional symptom of neurosis or psychosis, referring to him as "possibly an intelligent schizophrenic". The doctor puts Orr into a hypnotic trance while attached to the "Augmentor," a device he has invented for monitoring and enhancing, or augmenting brainwaves during dreaming to help with patient therapy. He encourages Orr to have an effective dream, recording his brain function all the while. The world changes slightly during this dream, and Haber realizes that Orr is telling the truth.

Haber begins to use Orr's effective dreams, first to create a prestigious, well-funded institute run by himself, then to attempt to solve various social problems. But these solutions unravel quickly: Haber suggests that Orr dream of an answer to overpopulation (resulting in a plague wiping out three-fourths of the human population), the end to all conflict on Earth (resulting in an alien invasion uniting mankind) and an end to racism (resulting in a world where everyone's skin is a uniform shade of gray).

Orr turns to lawyer Heather LeLache for help in getting out of his government-mandated treatments with Haber. LeLache doubts Orr's sanity but agrees to help him, eventually becoming an ally. Orr falls in love with LeLache.

Only after several failed attempts to "make the world right" does Haber admit to Orr that he believes in Orr's power. Having used the Augmentor to record and analyze Orr's supremely complex dreaming brainwaves, Haber begins creating a machine that will allow him to have his own effective dreams, and remake reality directly.

As Haber continues to use Orr's dreams to create change in human society, Orr remembers a dream he experienced years ago, which is briefly portrayed at the opening of the film (and which, it turns out, is in fact reality): The world was destroyed in a nuclear war, and Orr was poisoned by radiation. In his dying moments, Orr dreamed a world where the war did not happen, resulting in the events of the film as we see them.

Haber enters the final version of his machine for directing dreams and learns this truth, driving him mad. Orr, who has joined him in the dream state, is able to stop Haber's nightmare before it destroys the world. The result is a reality that jumbles together elements of the different worlds that Haber created via Orr's dreams, but is relatively stable. Orr is heartbroken because the LeLache in this reality was never his close friend or lover.

As the film ends, Orr is working in an antique store run by an alien. LeLache comes in to browse. She has only a vague memory of him, but agrees to join him for lunch. They encounter Haber, in a wheelchair, on their way to lunch. Haber recognizes Orr, but cannot come out of his catatonia.

== Cast ==
- Bruce Davison as George Orr
- Kevin Conway as Dr. William Haber
- Margaret Avery as Heather LeLache
- Niki Flacks as Penny Crouch
- Peyton Park as Mannie Ahrens
- Vandi Clark as Aunt Ethel
- Jo Livingston as George's Father
- Jane Roberts as Grandmother
- Tom Matts as Grandfather
- Frank Miller as Parole Officer
- Joye Nash as Woman on Subway
- Gena Sleete as Woman on Subway
- Ben McKinley III as Orderly
- R.A. Mihailoff as Orderly

== Behind the scenes ==
Directors David Loxton and Fred Barzyk were pioneers in the early video art movement. They met in 1968 at WGBH TV in Boston and collaborated for over 20 years, until Loxton's death in the early 1990s. The first science fiction drama they created together was a 1972 film called Between Time and Timbuktu, based on the work of Kurt Vonnegut, Jr.

With a two-week shooting schedule, and a lean budget of about $250,000, Loxton and Barzyk had to get creative to effectively convey The Lathe of Heaven's deeper meanings and sometimes grand science fiction scenarios. In an interview in 2000, Barzyk said:

David and I had a unique working relationship. We were co-producers, co-directors. If you really cut it down, I would run the set, and David would run behind-the-scenes. But when it came to content and the actual physical structure of the set, we had equal input. The reason that was important, especially on Lathe, is that we had a very limited budget, and we were moving into science fiction ... and let's face it, some of Ursula's ideas were pretty big. I mean, how the hell do we possibly even begin to portray the attack of aliens or the wiping out of billions of people with the plague? What it came down to was, we had to find metaphors. We had to find things that didn't cost that much money and still led to maybe the same kind of emotional impact. ... Our special effects in Lathe were not done the way they were because that was necessarily the direction we wanted to go. It was the direction we had to go. We didn't have enough money to be able to do these things, so we were constantly trying to figure out ways in which we could shoot something in half a day and imply vast amounts of impressions to the audience. For example, when everyone gets wiped out by the plague, we came up with the idea of putting people around a table and just constantly circling the table and making them distorted and growing older to imply all those people being killed. That was partly because we couldn't think of any other way to do it within the constraints of our budget. But we were also influenced by video artists. There was one artist who had taken fishwire and wrapped his face, for example, and so I used a variation of that in this scene. We grabbed from the art director the dust and the smoke and the cobwebs, and in effect we wound up using some of David's English heritage with the candelabras and the rest, which kind of went back to Great Expectations.

The film was shot at locations in Dallas, Texas, and nearby Fort Worth rather than in Portland, Oregon. These included the Dallas City Hall, the Tandy Center Fort Worth, Hyatt Regency Dallas with its Reunion Tower, and a vacated Mobil Oil Building in Fort Worth. Le Guin, her husband, their fifteen-year-old son, and her husband's eighty-year-old Aunt Ruby appear as extras in a scene where Heather and George talk over lunch in a cafeteria.

According to a 1978 article in The New York Times, during the process of funding a prospective series focused on "speculative fiction, a category of fairly recent vintage applied to ... the most thoughtful and provocative works of science fiction ... [such as] Arthur C. Clarke, Frank Herbert, Kurt Vonnegut Jr., Anthony Burgess and Robert Heinlein," Le Guin was one of several authors whose novels were considered for adaptation: "The [$750,000] financing was awarded as the result of an earlier grant by [the Corporation for Public Broadcasting] to research and develop such a series. After much study with a team of consultants that included critics, authors, editors, publishers and professors, a list of candidates for the series was compiled, from which Miss LeGuin's novel was selected" to be the series pilot. In her essay on the making of the film, Le Guin was asked by Loxton to choose which novel. "I picked The Lathe of Heaven because it's the only one of my books that I ever enjoyed imagining as a film."

At the time this funding was given, it was thought the film would be shot in Portland, Oregon, where the story takes place.

Loxton and Barzyk hoped that Lathe would be the first production in a public television series exploring science fiction literature. They created one more telefilm together under this rubric, 1983's Overdrawn at the Memory Bank, based on a short story by John Varley.

== Reception and awards ==
When it first aired in 1980, The Lathe of Heaven became one of the two highest-rated shows that season on PBS, drawing 10 percent of the audience in New York and 8 percent in Chicago, according to Nielsen ratings.

Michael E. Moore reviewed The Lathe of Heaven in Ares Magazine #1. Moore commented that "One hopes some producers who plan yet more clones of Star Wars will have watched Lathe and learned that science fiction does not consist solely of dogfights in space and cardboard heroes facing 'gee-whiz' challenges. The best science fiction, such as Lathe, examines humankind's place in the universe and the products and problems created by intelligence."

The Lathe of Heaven was nominated for a Hugo Award for Best Dramatic Presentation. The screenplay was nominated for a Writers Guild Award for writers Roger Swaybill and Diane English

In 1998, Entertainment Weekly magazine named the 1980 Lathe telefilm one of the top 100 greatest works of science fiction.

Of the 2000 re-release (see below), TV Guide wrote, "Unlike much current science fiction, it's driven by ideas rather than special effects, and Davison's subtle performance as George, who turns out to be a far tougher character than he at first appears, is a highlight." In Cinescape, a reviewer praised the film as

an instant classic ... a film of ideas rather than action ... [W]hile the minuscule budget didn't grant the filmmakers the grandeur of some of Le Guin's set pieces in the novel, such as the alien invasion or the melting of Portland, the film's strength comes from its performers and the suspenseful concepts in the writing.

Time magazine wrote:

Nineteen years before The Blair Witch Project, this classic sci-fi film showed that you can make an arresting fantasy with hardly more than the change under your couch cushions ... [S]ome of the no-budget effects haven't aged well--at one point the earth is visited by alien ships that look like electric hamburgers. The provocative exploration of consciousness, though, is priceless.

== 2000 re-release ==
After its initial broadcast in 1980, Lathe was occasionally shown over the next eight years. PBS' rights to rebroadcast the program expired in 1988. The Lathe of Heaven went on to become the most-requested program in PBS history.

Fans were critical of WNET's supposed "warehousing" of the film, but the budgetary barriers to rebroadcast were high. In a 2000 article, Joseph Basile, director of program rights and clearances for WNET, said, "'Lay people don't understand that to take a program out of mothballs, we have to pay for and clear rights with all participants in the program ... It's a difficult and time-consuming and expensive endeavor."

Basile also had to negotiate a special agreement with the composer of the film's score, and deal with the Beatles recording excerpted in the original soundtrack, "With a Little Help from My Friends", which is integral to a plot point in both the novel and the film. A cover version replaces the Beatles' own recording, "which would have taken too long to clear and cost 'an arm and a leg'."

Once rights issues were resolved, the film was cleaned up from two-inch Quadruplex videotape copies. In 2000, Lathe was finally rebroadcast and released to video and DVD. In addition to the film, this release features an interview with Ursula K. Le Guin by Bill Moyers, which initially aired along with the film's rebroadcast.

The back cover of the DVD notes, “The original film materials have been lost forever. A new digital master was created from the surviving 2″ tape and was then color corrected using state-of-the-art technology. Ghosting and darkening of the images may appear in some scenes. It is the best quality transfer possible of this important work using the only surviving materials.”

WNET has not said how much it cost to re-release Lathe, stating simply that it "wasn't cheap," and that hopefully royalties would help recoup the expense.

== Pop culture impact ==
Bruce Davison guest-starred in a 1995 episode of the television show The Outer Limits titled "White Light Fever" which features a visual homage to Lathe: a "tunnel of blue light" effect very similar to a special effect used near the end of the film. (An image from this sequence is featured on the cover of both the mass market paperback edition of the novel that was issued with the film's premiere, and the 2000 video/DVD release).

The novel was again adapted as a telefilm by A&E Networks in 2002, titled Lathe of Heaven.
