= Michael Goi =

American cinematographer and director

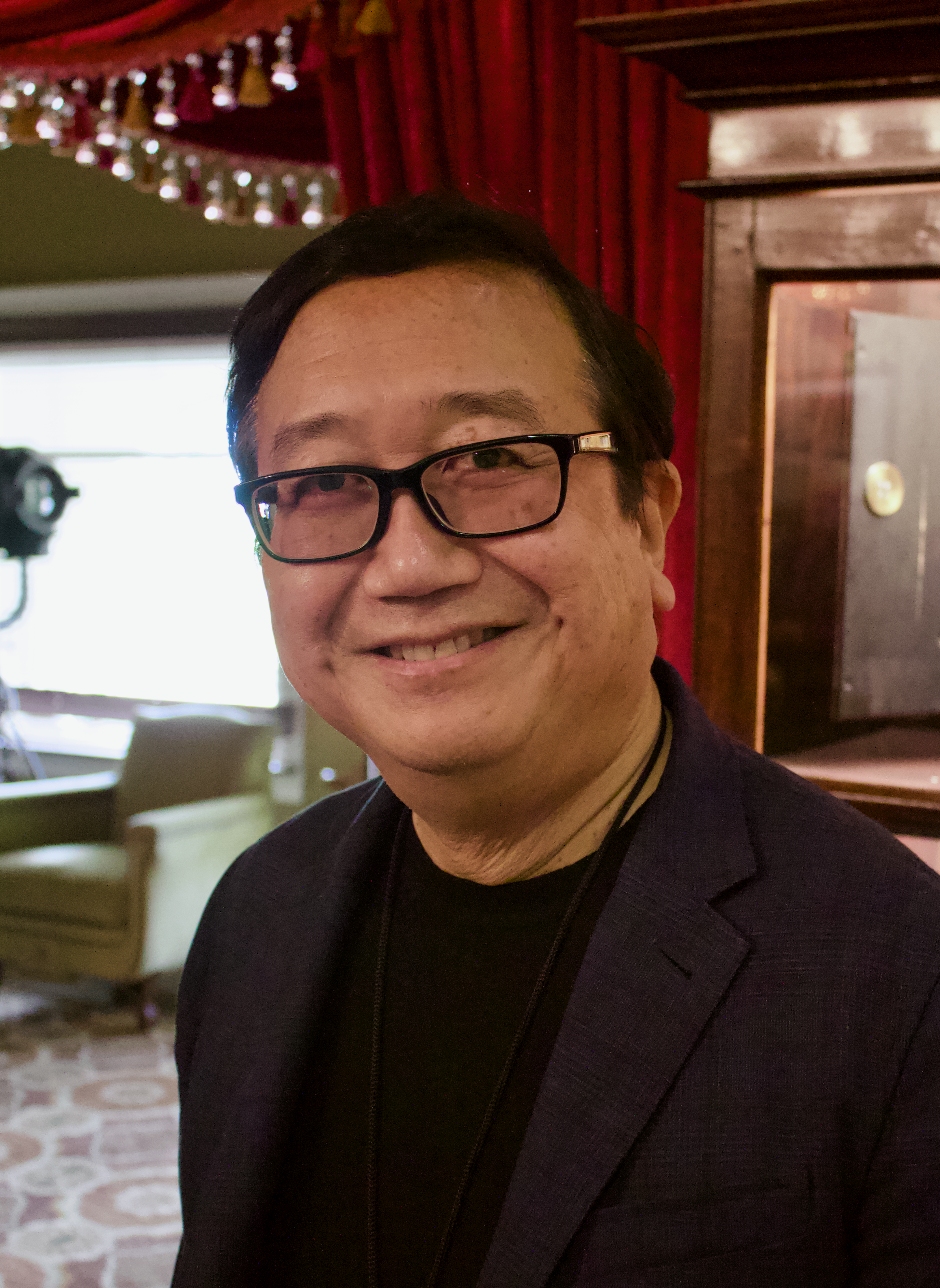
- Goi in 2023
- Born: March 4, 1959 (age 67); Chicago, Illinois
- Other name: Michael K. Goi
- Education: Columbia College Chicago
- Occupations: Cinematographer, television and film director, producer, screenwriter
- Years active: 1980–present

President of the American Society of Cinematographers
- In office 2009–2012
- Preceded by: Daryn Okada
- Succeeded by: Stephen Lighthill

Michael K. Goi, ASC, ISC (born March 4, 1959) is an American cinematographer, director, producer, and writer of television and film. He is best known for his work for Ryan Murphy and Brad Falchuk on the television series Glee, Scream Queens and American Horror Story. He is a four-time Primetime Emmy Award nominee for his cinematography.

His directorial work includes the 2011 horror film Megan Is Missing and its 2026 sequel vertical series Megan Is Missing: Evil Never Dies, and episodes of series like The Rookie and its spinoff The Rookie: Feds (which he also produced), Chilling Adventures of Sabrina, and Avatar: The Last Airbender.

Goi served as the 49th President of the American Society of Cinematographers, from 2009 to 2012.

== Early life ==
Of Japanese descent, Goi was born and raised in Chicago, and was educated at Columbia College Chicago. He cites Mario Bava's giallo film Blood and Black Lace and Mike Nichols' The Graduate (1967) as key early influences.

== Career ==
He began his career as director of photography on a short horror film directed by John Strysik, The Music of Erich Zann, in 1980; and then on the comedy The Blues Brothers, as a production assistant.

He went on to serve as cinematographer on film and television series, such as: Moonstalker, How U Like Me Now, What Matters Most, Call Waiting, Funky Monkey, Cloud 9, Witness Protection, My Name is Earl, The Nine Lives of Chloe King, Mr. Sunshine, Salem and The Town That Dreaded Sundown.

Goi has written and directed three feature films during his career; Voyeur, an action drama about a reluctant porn star and her biggest fan; Megan Is Missing (2011), about internet predators and the disappearance of Megan Stewart (Rachel Quinn); and Mary, starring Gary Oldman and Emily Mortimer, on which he also served as the cinematographer.

=== Web Therapy ===
Goi served as the exclusive cinematographer on Lisa Kudrow's Web Therapy throughout the entirety of its 87-episode run.

=== Work with Ryan Murphy ===
As director of photography, Goi first worked with prolific writer/producers Ryan Murphy and Brad Falchuk on their FOX musical comedy Glee, in 2011, with the episode "Asian F". That same year he also began work on the duo's new FX series American Horror Story. His first episode on the series was the Murder House installment "Rubber Man". He went on to work on Murphy's short-lived NBC comedy The New Normal; and the trio's 2015 horror/comedy Scream Queens. During the fourth season of American Horror Story, Goi made his series directorial debut with "Magical Thinking". He served as the series' exclusive cinematographer from the premiere of Asylum, until the end of the fifth season. He was succeeded in the capacity by Breaking Bad's Nelson Cragg, with the commencement of the sixth year.

== American Society of Cinematographers ==
Goi joined the American Society of Cinematographers (ASC) in 2003. Goi was the 49th President of the ASC, from 2009 to 2012.

In 2025, he received the ASC's Career Achievement in Television Award. The same year, he was appointed to its Artificial Intelligence Committee.

== Filmography ==
=== Film ===
==== Director ====
Year	Title	Director	Writer	Notes	Refs.
1989	Chains	No	Yes		
1999	Voyeur	Yes	Yes		
2011	Megan Is Missing	Yes	Yes	Also editor and co-producer	
2019	Mary	Yes	No		

==== Cinematographer ====
Year	Title	Notes
1982	A Hunger Artist	
1989	Moonstalker	
1989	Chains	
1989	Sam and Sarah	Also editor
1992	How U Like Me Now	
1992	Hellmaster	
1994	Hollywood Hills 90028	Also still photographer
1995	Ladies in Waiting	
1996	Evil Obsession	
1996	Frankie D.	
1997	Deadlock: A Passion for Murder	
1998	Hundred Percent	
1998	Vampire Centerfolds	With Geoffrey de Valois
1998	Sorority House Vampires	Uncredited
1998	Born Champion	
1999	The Awakening of Gabriella	
1999	Forbidden Sins	
2001	What Matters Most	
2004	Call Waiting	
2004	Funky Monkey	
2004	The Bike Squad	
2006	Cloud 9	
2006	Fingerprints	
2006	Cut Off	
2007	The Dukes	
2007	Frankie D	
2008	Witless Protection	
2010	Expecting Mary	
2011	Kiss and Tell: The History of Black Romance in Movie	Documentary
2014	The Town That Dreaded Sundown	
2019	Mary	
2020	Words on Bathroom Walls	

=== Television ===
==== Director ====
Year	Title	Episode(s)	Ref.
2004	Sexy Urban Legends	"Sleeping with Strangers" (Segment "Organ Donor")	
2015–2016	American Horror Story	"Magical Thinking"	
2015–2016	American Horror Story	"Room Service"	
2015–2016	American Horror Story	"Flicker"	
2015–2016	American Horror Story	"Chapter 2"	
2016	Pretty Little Liars	"Hit and Run, Run, Run"	
2017	Sleepy Hollow	"Child's Play"	
2017	Famous in Love	"Taking Care of Business"	
2017	Shadowhunters: The Mortal Instruments	"Those of Demon Blood"	
2017	Nashville	"The Night Before (Life Goes On)"	
2018	Falling Water	"Nothing Personal"	
2018	Falling Water	"The Art of the Deal"	
2018	The Arrangement	"Surface Tension"	
2018	The Gifted	"coMplications"	
2018	The Gifted	"iMprint"	
2018–2025	The Rookie	"Time of Death"	
2018–2025	The Rookie	"Plain Clothes Day"	
2018–2025	The Rookie	"Free Fall"	
2018–2025	The Rookie	"Impact"	
2018–2025	The Rookie	"Hand-Off"	
2018–2025	The Rookie	"In Justice"	
2018–2025	The Rookie	"The Squeeze"	
2018–2025	The Rookie	"Wildfire"	
2019	Empire	"My Fault Is Past"	
2019	Swamp Thing	"The Anatomy Lesson"	
2019–2020	Chilling Adventures of Sabrina	"Chapter Thirteen: The Passion of Sabrina Spellman"	
2019–2020	Chilling Adventures of Sabrina	"Chapter Six: All Of Them Witches"	
2019–2023	Riverdale	"Chapter Sixty-Five: In Treatment"	
2019–2023	Riverdale	"Chapter One Hundred Thirty-Two: Miss Teen Riverdale"	
2020	Charmed	"Guess Who's Coming To SafeSpace Seattle"	
2021	Big Sky	"Let It Be Him"	
2021	Big Sky	"Nice Animals"	
2021	Big Sky	"Love Is a Strange and Dangerous Thing"	
2021	Kung Fu	"Guidance"	
2022–2023	The Rookie: Feds	"Face Off"	
2022–2023	The Rookie: Feds	"The Silent Prisoner"	
2022–2023	The Rookie: Feds	"The Remora"	
2022–2023	The Rookie: Feds	"Red One"	
2024	Avatar: The Last Airbender	"Aang"	
2024	Avatar: The Last Airbender	"Warriors"	
2025	Doc	"...Must Come Down"	
2026	Brilliant Minds	"The Missing Person"	

==== Cinematographer ====
TV movies

- The Fixer (1998)
- Who Killed Atlanta's Children? (2000)
- Christmas Rush (2002)
- Red Water (2003)
- Judas (2004)
- Katie Sullivan (2006)
- Life on Mars (2008)
- The Untitled Michael Jacobs Pilot (2010)
- How to Be a Better American (2010)
- Bloodline (2013)
- The Death of Eva Sofia Valdez (2016)

TV series

Year	Title	Notes
1999	The Pleasure Zone	13 episodes
1999-2000	Nightcap	11 episodes
2001	Lady Chatterley's Stories	2 episodes
2006	Invasion	Episode "The Last Wave Goodbye" (With Jeffrey Jur)
2007	The Wedding Bells	7 episodes
2007-08	My Name Is Earl	23 episodes
2008-13	Web Therapy	64 episodes
2009	In the Motherhood	4 episodes
2009-10	The Mentalist	7 episodes
2011	The Nine Lives of Chloe King	9 episodes
2011	Mr. Sunshine	12 episodes
2011-12	Glee	7 episodes
2011-13	Web Therapy	23 episodes
2011-16	American Horror Story	52 episodes
2012	The New Normal	Episode "Pilot"
2014	Salem	12 episodes
2015	Scream Queens	Episodes "Pilot", "Hell Week"
2024	Avatar: The Last Airbender	Episodes "Aang", "Warriors"

=== Vertical series ===
- Megan Is Missing: Evil Never Dies (2026); writer and director

== See also ==
- List of presidents of the American Society of Cinematographers
