= David Loxton =

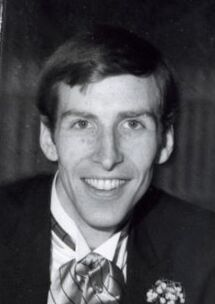

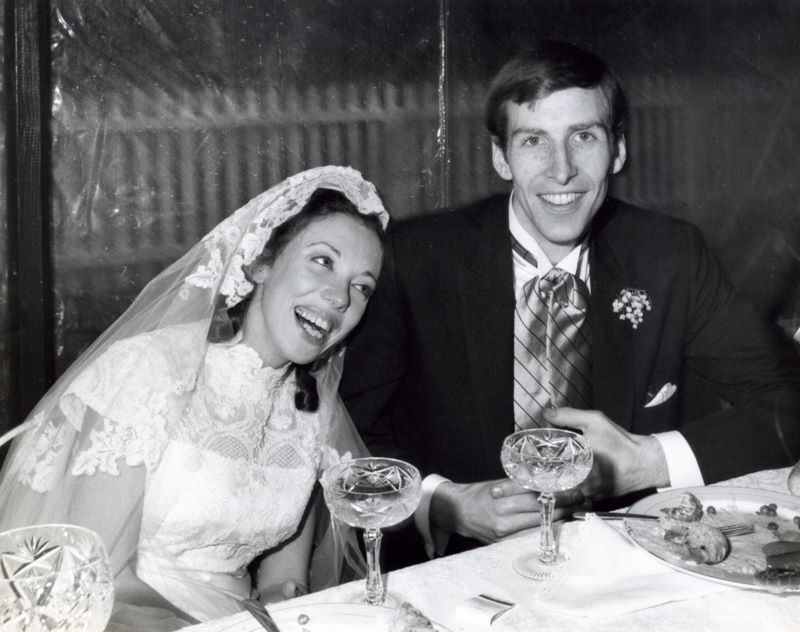
Loxton on his wedding day

David R. Loxton (January 28, 1943 – September 20, 1989), was a Canadian-born British and American producer of documentaries and other programs for public television in the US.

== Early life and career ==
Loxton was born in Kingston, Ontario, Canada, the son of Bill Loxton and Binkie Loxton (née Pattullo). He grew up in England, where his father was a wing commander in the RAF. Upon moving to the US in 1966, he joined the production staff of WNET, the major New York public-television affiliate. In 1972, he founded TV Lab, a program for artists to create video works through an artist-in-residence program.

In addition to serving as the director of the TV Lab from 1972 through 1984, Loxton developed the Nonfiction TV series, which produced works such as Paul Jacobs and the Nuclear Gang, I Remember Harlem and The Times of Harvey Milk. Loxton was the executive producer of Nonfiction TV from 1978 through 1983. Loxton was the executive producer of programs for the Great Performances, NET Playhouse and American Playhouse series.

During his career he received various awards:

- Emmy Awards for The Times of Harvey Milk (1985)
- Du Pont/Columbia Awards for The Police Tapes (1977), Paul Jacobs and the Nuclear Gang (1979), Third Avenue: Only the Strong Survive (1980) Lord of the Universe (1974), I Remember Harlem (1982), Pesticide and Pills (1982).

In 1985, he won an ACE award, cable television's equivalent of an Emmy, for best original drama, for Countdown to Looking Glass, about a United States-Soviet confrontation in the Middle East. He was co-executive producer, with Frederick Barzyk, of The Lathe of Heaven which is a 1979 film (released in 1980) based on the 1971 science fiction novel The Lathe of Heaven by Ursula K. Le Guin..

In addition, he was director of drama for the Great Performances series and senior executive producer for specials, both at WNET. He was executive producer of Tales From the Hollywood Hills, a critically acclaimed series shown under the auspices of Great Performances. When he became ill, he had just begun production of Childhood, a six-part documentary for the Public Broadcasting Service.

== Personal life ==
He married Pamela Anne Marx on May 11, 1968, at the Presbyterian Church in Shrewsbury, New Jersey; they had 2 sons. He died of pancreatic cancer at Memorial Sloan-Kettering Cancer Center in Manhattan in 1989. His obituary was published in The New York Times.
