= Fred Barzyk =

American television producer

Fred Barzyk (b. Milwaukee, October 18, 1936) is a Boston-based television producer and director who was president of Creative Television Associates, Inc., from 1965–2001. Known for his avant garde experiments in broadcast television, he worked as a producer for GBH, the multiplatform public media organization, from 1958–2001. He has produced and directed television programs for PBS, HBO, NBC, ABC and CBS, directing such stars as Morgan Freeman, Christian Slater, Dan Aykroyd, Rosie Perez, Matt Dillon, Claire Danes and Lily Tomlin. He has won the Venice Film Festival Award, two ACE awards, three Emmys and a Peabody Award.

== Career ==
Barzyk earned his bachelor’s degree in 1958 from Marquette University, where he was active in the theater program. He studied for a master’s degree in communication at Boston University.

Barzyk came to Boston in 1958 and joined GBH in 1959. He was the founder and first director of GBH’s New Television Workshop from 1967–1979. He and his work are featured in the 2001 essay collection Fred Barzyk: The Search for a Personal Vision in Broadcast Television. An accomplished videographer and artist, Barzyk has shown his work at the DeCordova Sculpture Park and Museum in Lincoln, Mass., and at the Haggerty Museum of Art at Marquette University in Milwaukee, which held an exhibit that featured Barzyk’s work from his years at GBH.

== Awards and nominations ==
Venice Film Award, 1985 for best television director worldwide for HBO’s Countdown to Looking Glass

Cable ACE Award, 1985 for Countdown to Looking Glass

Peabody Award for Tender Places

Karios Award, 2001, from Marquette University

== Filmography ==
Negro and the American Promise (1961)

Five Days (1961)

The “Double Channel” Broadcasts, (1968)

The Medium is the Medium ( 1968)

What’s Happening, Mr. Silver? (1968)

Between Time and Timbuktu (1972)

Jean Shepherd’s America (1972)

Mother’s Little Network (1972)

Collisions: The Grand Failure (1977)

Visions’ Charlie Smith and the Fritter Tree (1978)

The Chicken that Ate Columbus (1978)

The Lathe of Heaven (1979)

Secrets (1985)

Jenny’s Song, 1988

Tender Places, 1987

Puzzlemania (1987,1988)

Destinos, (1988–92)

Breast Care Test (1994)

The Ryan Interview (2000)

The Journey (2011)
