= Primetime Emmy Award for Outstanding Cinematography for a Series (One Hour) =

Primetime Emmy Award for Cinematography for a Series (One Hour)
- Awarded for: Outstanding Cinematography for a Series (One Hour)
- Country: United States
- Presented by: Academy of Television Arts & Sciences
- Currently held by: Spider-Noir (2026)
- Website: emmys.com

The Primetime Emmy Award for Outstanding Cinematography for a Series (One Hour) is an annual award presented as part of the Primetime Emmy Awards. From 1971 until 2008, all single-camera series competed together in a combined category. Awards for one-hour and half-hour series were divided in 2008 and the category ran until 2010. From 2011 to 2016, the awards were again combined for all single-camera series. They were redivided in 2017.

== Winners and nominations ==
indicates the winner

=== 1950s ===
Year	Program	Episode	Nominees	Network
Outstanding Achievement in Cinematography
1956
1956	Medic	"Black Friday"	William A. Sickner	NBC
1956	Dragnet		Edward Colman	NBC
1956	Four Star Playhouse	"The Collar"	George E. Diskant	CBS
1956	Private Secretary		Robert Pittack	CBS
1956	The Loretta Young Show	"I Remember the Rani"	Norbert Brodine	NBC
1957
1957	The Loretta Young Show	"The Pearl"	Norbert Brodine	NBC
1957	Four Star Playhouse	"Tunnel of Fear"	George E. Diskant	CBS
1957	General Electric Theater	"The Glorious Gift of Molly Malloy"	Robert Pittack	CBS
1957	General Electric Theater	"The Night Goes On"	John L. Russell	CBS
1957	The 20th Century Fox Hour	"Stranger in the Night"	Lloyd Ahern	CBS
1958
1958	The Bell Telephone Science Series	"Hemo the Magnificent"	Harold E. Wellman	CBS
1958	The Danny Thomas Show		Robert De Grasse	NBC
1958	Goodyear Theatre	"Voices in the Fog"	George E. Diskant	NBC
1958	Have Gun – Will Travel	"The Outlaw"	William Margulies	CBS
1958	The Loretta Young Show	"Miss Ashley's Demon"	Norbert Brodine	NBC
1959
1959	The Bell Telephone Hour	"The Alphabet Conspiracy"	Ellis W. Carter	NBC
1959	Alcoa-Goodyear Theatre	"Corporal Hardy"	Fred Jackman	NBC
1959	Have Gun – Will Travel	"Ella West"	William Margulies	CBS
1959	The Jane Wyman Show	"Day of Glory"	Mack Stengler	NBC
1959	Maverick	"Diamond in the Rough"	Ralph Woolsey	ABC
1959	Maverick	"Shady Deal at Sunny Acres"	Harold E. Stine	ABC

=== 1960s ===
Year	Program	Episode	Nominees	Network
1960
1960	Westinghouse Desilu Playhouse		Charles Straumer	CBS
1960	The Lawless Years		William Margulies	NBC
1960	77 Sunset Strip		Ralph Woolsey	ABC
1961
1961	The Twilight Zone		George T. Clemens	CBS
1961	Outlaws		William Margulies	NBC
1961	Wagon Train		Walter Strenge	NBC
1962
1962	Naked City		Jack Priestley	ABC
1962	Ben Casey		Ted Voigtlander	ABC
1962	Bonanza		Haskell Boggs, Walter Castle	NBC
1962	The Twilight Zone		George T. Clemens	CBS
1962	Vincent Van Gogh: A Self Portrait		Guy Blanchard	NBC
1962	Wagon Train		Walter Strenge	NBC
1963
1963	Naked City		Jack Priestley	ABC
1963	Bell & Howell Close-Up!		William Hartigan, Edmondo Ricci	ABC
1963	Combat!		Robert B. Hauser	ABC
1963	The DuPont Show of the Week		Joe Vadala	NBC
1963	The River Nile		Guy Blanchard	NBC
1963	Shakespeare: Soul of an Age		Guy Blanchard	NBC
1963	The Twilight Zone		George T. Clemens, Robert W. Pittack	CBS
1964
1964	The Kremlin		J. Baxter Peters	NBC
1964	East Side/West Side		Jack Priestley	CBS
1964	Greece: The Golden Age		Bradford Kress	NBC
1964	Kraft Suspense Theatre		Ellis F. Thackery	NBC
1965
1965	Twelve O'Clock High		William W. Spencer	ABC
1965	Bonanza		Haskell Boggs, William F. Whitely	NBC
1965	The Man from U.N.C.L.E.		Fred J. Koenekamp	NBC
1966
1966	Voyage to the Bottom of the Sea		Winton C. Hoch	ABC
1966	Bonanza		Haskell Boggs, William F. Whitely	NBC
1966	The Fugitive		Meredith M. Nicholson	ABC
1966	The Man from U.N.C.L.E.		Fred J. Koenekamp	NBC
1966	Michelangelo: The Last Giant		Tom Priestley	NBC
1966	Run for Your Life	"The Cold, Cold War of Paul Bryan"	Lionel Lindon	NBC
1966	The Wild Wild West		Ted Voigtlander	CBS
1967
1967	Bonanza		Haskell Boggs, William F. Whitely	NBC
1968
1968	It Takes a Thief	"A Thief Is a Thief Is a Thief"	Ralph Woolsey	ABC
1968	Hogan's Heroes		Gordon Avil	CBS
1968	The Time Tunnel	"Raiders in Outer Space"	Winton C. Hoch	ABC
1969
1969	Here's Peggy Fleming		George J. Folsey	NBC
1969	Hawaii Five-O	"Up Tight"	Frank Phillips	CBS
1969	Land of the Giants	"The Crash"	Howard Schwartz	ABC
1969	19th Summer Olympic Games Special Reports		Robert Riger	ABC

=== 1970s ===
Year	Program	Episode	Nominees	Network
Outstanding Cinematography for a Series
1970
1970	Marcus Welby, M.D.	"Hello, Goodbye, Hello"	Walter Strenge	ABC
1970	Mission: Impossible	"The Amnesiac"	Al Francis	CBS
1970	N.Y.P.D.		Harvey Genkins	ABC
1971
1971	The Name of the Game		Jack A. Marta	NBC
1971	Bonanza	"The Love Child"	Ted Voigtlander	NBC
1971	Marcus Welby, M.D.	"A Spanish Saying I Made Up"	Walter Strenge	ABC
1972
1972	Columbo	"Blueprint for Murder"	Lloyd Ahern	NBC
1972	Arnie	"The Only Way to Go"	Charles G. Clarke	CBS
1972	Hawaii Five-O		Robert L. Morrison	CBS
1973
1973	Kung Fu	"An Eye for an Eye"	Jack Woolf	ABC
1973	Banacek	"Detour to Nowhere"	Sam Leavitt	NBC
1973	The Waltons		Russell Metty	CBS
1974
1974	Columbo	"Any Old Port in a Storm"	Harry L. Wolf	NBC
1974	Hawaii Five-O		Bill Huffman, Robert L. Morrison, Jack Whitman	CBS
1974	Kojak		Gerald Perry Finnerman	CBS
1975
1975	Columbo	"Playback"	Richard C. Glouner	NBC
1975	Kojak	"Wall Street Gunslinger"	Vilis Lapenieks, Sol Negrin	CBS
1975	M*A*S*H	"Bombed"	William Jurgensen	CBS
1976
1976	Baretta	"Keep Your Eye on the Sparrow"	Harry L. Wolf	ABC
1976	Kojak	"A Question of Answers"	Sol Negrin	CBS
1976	Little House on the Prairie	"Remember Me"	Ted Voigtlander	NBC
1976	M*A*S*H	"Hawkeye"	William Jurgensen	CBS
1976	Rich Man, Poor Man	"Part 1"	Howard Schwartz	ABC
1977	Outstanding Cinematography for a Series			
1977	Captains and the Kings	"Chapter 1"	Ric Waite	NBC
1977	Baretta	"Soldier in the Jungle"	Sherman L. Kunkel	ABC
1977	Kojak	"A Shield for Murder, Part 2"	Sol Negrin	CBS
1977	M*A*S*H	"Dear Sigmund"	William Jurgensen	CBS
1977	Arthur Hailey's the Moneychangers	"Part 1"	Joseph F. Biroc	NBC
1977	Once an Eagle	"Part 1"	John J. Jones	NBC
1977	Roots	"Part 2"	Stevan Larner	ABC
1977	Roots	"Part 7"	Joseph M. Wilcots	ABC
1977	Special Classification for Individual Achievement (Note: As a juried award, nominees had to garner 50% approval to win the award. The nominee did not meet the benchmark and no award was given.)			
1977	The Hardy Boys/Nancy Drew Mysteries	"Mystery of the Haunted House"	Enzo A. Martinelli	
1978
1978	Little House on the Prairie	"The Fighter"	Ted Voigtlander	NBC
1978	The Awakening Land		Michel Hugo	NBC
1978	The Love Boat	"The Inspector/A Very Special Girl/Until the Last Goodbye"	Lloyd Ahern	ABC
1978	Roll of Thunder, Hear My Cry		Robert B. Hauser	ABC
1978	Washington: Behind Closed Doors	"Part 1"	Joseph F. Biroc	ABC
Outstanding Cinematography for a Single-Camera Series
1979
1979	Little House on the Prairie	"The Craftsman"	Ted Voigtlander	NBC
1979	Barnaby Jones	"Memory of a Nightmare"	William W. Spencer	CBS
1979	Little Women	"Episode 2"	Joseph F. Biroc	NBC

=== 1980s ===
Year	Program	Episode	Nominees	Network
1980
1980	The Contender	"Breakthrough"	Enzo A. Martinelli	CBS
1980	Fantasy Island	"The Wedding"	Emmett Bergholz	ABC
1980	From Here to Eternity	"Pearl Harbor"	Gerald Perry Finnerman	NBC
1980	The Incredible Hulk	"Broken Image"	John McPherson	CBS
1980	Little House on the Prairie	"May We Make Them Proud"	Ted Voigtlander	NBC
1980	Quincy, M.E.	"Riot"	Alric Edens	ABC
1981
1981	Hill Street Blues	"Hill Street Station"	William Cronjager	NBC
1981	Breaking Away	"La Strada"	Brianne Murphy	ABC
1981	Buck Rogers in the 25th Century	"Time of the Hawk"	Ben Colman	NBC
1981	The Gangster Chronicles	"Chapter One"	Gerald Perry Finnerman	NBC
1981	Little House on the Prairie	"Sylvia"	Ted Voigtlander	NBC
1981	Nero Wolfe	"Death and the Dolls"	Charles W. Short	NBC
1982
1982	Fame	"Alone in a Crowd"	William W. Spencer	NBC
1982	Baker's Dozen	"A Class by Himself"	Sol Negrin	CBS
1982	Little House on the Prairie	"He Was Only Twelve, Part 2"	Ted Voigtlander	NBC
1982	Lou Grant	"Ghosts"	Robert F. Liu	CBS
1982	Magnum, P.I.	"Memories Are Forever"	Woody Omens	CBS
1983
1983	Casablanca	"The Masterbuilder's Woman"	Joseph F. Biroc	NBC
1983	Fantasy Island	"The Curse of the Moreaus/My Man Friday"	Emmett Bergholz	ABC
1983	Little House on the Prairie	"The Wild Boy, Part 1"	Harry L. Wolf	NBC
1984
1984	The New Mike Hammer	"More Than Murder"	James Crabe	CBS
1984	Airwolf	"Shadow of the Hawke"	Howard Schwartz, Robert E. Collins	CBS
1984	Dynasty	"New Lady in Town"	Richard L. Rawlings	ABC
1984	Fame	"Break Dance"	Sherman Kunkel	Syndicated
1985
1985	Miami Vice	"Brother's Keeper"	Robert E. Collins	NBC
1985	Code Name: Foxfire	"Robin's Blue Egg"	John Elsenbach	NBC
1985	Highway to Heaven	"Child of God"	Ted Voigtlander	NBC
1985	Highway to Heaven	"A Match Made in Heaven"	Brianne Murphy	NBC
1985	Miami Vice	"No Exit"	Duke Callaghan	NBC
1985	Scarecrow and Mrs. King	"D.O.A.: Delirious on Arrival"	Edward R. Brown	CBS
1986
1986	Amazing Stories	"The Mission"	John McPherson	NBC
1986	Alfred Hitchcock Presents	"Road Hog"	Woody Omens	NBC
1986	Blacke's Magic	"Prisoner of Paradise"	Terry K. Meade	NBC
1986	The Colbys	"The Celebration"	Richard L. Rawlings	ABC
1986	Highway to Heaven	"To Bind the Wounds"	Ted Voigtlander	NBC
1986	Moonlighting	"The Dream Sequence Always Rings Twice"	Gerald Perry Finnerman	ABC
1987
1987	Heart of the City	"Cold Steal and Neon"	Woody Omens	ABC
1987	Amazing Stories	"Go to the Head of the Class"	John McPherson	NBC
1987	Crime Story	"Top of the World"	James A. Contner	NBC
1987	Highway to Heaven	"Basinger's New York"	Ted Voigtlander	NBC
1987	L.A. Law	"Sidney, the Dead-Nosed Reindeer"	Robert Seaman	NBC
1988
1988	Beauty and the Beast	"Pilot"	Roy H. Wagner	CBS
1988	Highway to Heaven	"A Dream of Wild Horses"	Ted Voigtlander	NBC
1988	Magnum, P.I.	"Unfinished Business"	John C. Flinn III	CBS
1988	Moonlighting	"Here's Living With You, Kid"	Gerald Perry Finnerman	ABC
1988	Ohara	"See Something That Isn't There"	Richard M. Rawlings Jr.	ABC
1988	Star Trek: The Next Generation	"The Big Goodbye"	Edward R. Brown	Syndicated
1989
1989	Quantum Leap	"Genesis, Part 1"	Roy H. Wagner	NBC
1989	Beauty and the Beast	"Ceremony of Innocence"	Stevan Larner	CBS
1989	Jake and the Fatman	"Wish You Were Here"	John C. Flinn III	CBS
1989	Paradise	"Long Lost Lawson"	Richard M. Rawlings Jr.	CBS

=== 1990s ===
Year	Program	Episode	Nominees	Network
1990
1990	Quantum Leap	"Pool Hall Blues"	Michael W. Watkins	NBC
1990	Beauty and the Beast	"Snow"	Stevan Larner	CBS
1990	Jake and the Fatman	"If I Didn't Care"	John C. Flinn III	CBS
1990	Midnight Caller	"Evil Is Live Spelled Backward, Part 2"	Bradley B. Six	NBC
1990	Murder, She Wrote	"Night of the Tarantula"	John Elsenbach	CBS
1991
1991	Quantum Leap	"The Leap Home, Part 2"	Michael W. Watkins	NBC
1991	Star Trek: The Next Generation	"Family"	Marvin V. Rush	Syndicated
1991	The Trials of Rosie O'Neill	"Starting Over"	Jack Priestley	CBS
1992
1992	Northern Exposure	"Cicely"	Frank Prinzi	CBS
1992	Doogie Howser, M.D.	"Summer of '91"	Michael D. O'Shea	ABC
1992	Quantum Leap	"Dreams"	Michael W. Watkins	NBC
1992	The Young Indiana Jones Chronicles	"British East Africa, September 1909"	Hugh Miles, Miguel Icaza	ABC
1993
1993	Law & Order	"Conspiracy"	Constantine Makris	NBC
1993	Northern Exposure	"Revelations"	Frank Prinzi	CBS
1993	Quantum Leap	"Trilogy, Part 1"	Michael W. Watkins	NBC
1993	Reasonable Doubts	"Life Lines"	Richard M. Rawlings Jr.	NBC
1993	The Young Indiana Jones Chronicles	"Young Indiana Jones and the Mystery of the Blues"	David Tattersall	ABC
1994
1994	Dr. Quinn, Medicine Woman	"Where the Heart Is"	Roland 'Ozzie' Smith	CBS
1994	seaQuest DSV	"Such Great Patience"	Kenneth Zunder	NBC
1995
1995	Chicago Hope	"Over the Rainbow"	Tim Suhrstedt	CBS
1995	Babylon 5	"The Geometry of Shadows"	John C. Flinn III	Syndicated
1995	Dr. Quinn, Medicine Woman	"A Washington Affair"	Roland 'Ozzie' Smith	CBS
1995	NYPD Blue	"You Bet Your Life"	Brian J. Reynolds	ABC
1995	Star Trek: Voyager	"Heroes and Demons"	Marvin V. Rush	UPN
1995	The X-Files	"One Breath"	John Bartley	Fox
1996
1996	The X-Files	"Grotesque"	John Bartley	Fox
1996	Babylon 5	"Comes the Inquisitor"	John C. Flinn III	Syndicated
1996	Chicago Hope	"Leave of Absence"	Kenneth Zunder	CBS
1996	ER	"Hell and High Water"	Richard Thorpe	NBC
1996	Murder One	"Chapter One"	Aaron Schneider	ABC
1997
1997	Law & Order	"Mad Dog"	Constantine Makris	NBC
1997	Chicago Hope	"A Time to Kill"	James R. Bagdonas	CBS
1997	Gun	"Ricochet"	Roy H. Wagner	ABC
1997	Relativity	"Karen and Her Sisters"	Michael D. O'Shea	ABC
1997	Star Trek: Deep Space Nine	"Apocalypse Rising"	Jonathan West	Syndicated
1998
1998	Law & Order	"Stalker"	Constantine Makris	NBC
1998	Chicago Hope	"Brain Salad Surgery"	James R. Bagdonas	CBS
1998	Earth: Final Conflict	"Float Like a Butterfly"	Michael McMurray	Syndicated
1998	JAG	"The Good of the Service"	Hugo Cortina	CBS
1998	The X-Files	"The Post-Modern Prometheus"	Joel Ransom	Fox
1999
1999	Felicity	"Todd Mulcahy, Part 2"	Robert Primes	The WB
1999	Chicago Hope	"Home Is Where the Heartache Is"	James R. Bagdonas	CBS
1999	JAG	"Gypsy Eyes"	Hugo Cortina	CBS
1999	The Practice	"Happily Ever After"	Dennis Smith	ABC
1999	The X-Files	"The Unnatural"	Bill Roe	Fox

=== 2000s ===
Year	Program	Episode	Nominees	Network
2000	The West Wing	"Pilot"	Thomas Del Ruth	NBC
2000	Buffy the Vampire Slayer	"Hush"	Michael Gershman	The WB
2000	JAG	"Boomerang, Part 2"	Hugo Cortina	CBS
2000	Law & Order	"Entitled, Part 2"	Constantine Makris	NBC
2000	The Sopranos	"D-Girl"	Phil Abraham	HBO
2001	The West Wing	"Noël"	Thomas Del Ruth	NBC
2001	Ally McBeal	"Cloudy Skies, Chance of Parade"	Billy Dickson	Fox
2001	JAG	"Adrift, Part 1"	Hugo Cortina	CBS
2001	Law & Order	"Endurance"	John Beymer	NBC
2001	The Practice	"The Deal"	Dennis Smith	ABC
2001	The X-Files	"This is Not Happening"	Bill Roe	Fox
2002	Alias	"Truth Be Told"	Michael Bonvillain	ABC
2002	Ally McBeal	"Reality Bites"	Billy Dickson	Fox
2002	CSI: Crime Scene Investigation	"Identity Crisis"	Jonathan West	CBS
2002	Six Feet Under	"Driving Mr. Mossback"	Alan Caso	HBO
2002	The West Wing	"Bartlet for America"	Thomas Del Ruth	NBC
2003	CSI: Miami	"Simple Man"	Michael D. O'Shea	CBS
2003	Alias	"Double Agent"	Michael Bonvillain	ABC
2003	Six Feet Under	"Nobody Sleeps"	Alan Caso	HBO
2003	The West Wing	"Holy Night"	Thomas Del Ruth	NBC
2004	Carnivàle	"Pick a Number"	Jeff Jur	HBO
2004	Alias	"Conscious"	Donald E. Thorin	ABC
2004	CSI: Crime Scene Investigation	"XX"	Frank Byers	CBS
2004	The Sopranos	"Irregular Around the Margins"	Phil Abraham	HBO
2004	The West Wing	"7A WF 83429"	Thomas Del Ruth	NBC
2005	Deadwood	"Complications"	James Glennon	HBO
2005	Carnivàle	"The Road to Damascus"	Jim Denault	HBO
2005	Carnivàle	"Lincoln Highway"	Jeff Jur	HBO
2005	Six Feet Under	"Untitled"	Lowell Peterson	HBO
2005	24	"Day 4: 5:00 a.m. — 6:00 a.m."	Rodney Charters	Fox
2006	CSI: Crime Scene Investigation	"Gum Drops"	Michael Slovis	CBS
2006	Everybody Hates Chris	"Everybody Hates Funerals"	Mark Doering-Powell	UPN
2006	Lost	"Man of Science, Man of Faith"	Michael Bonvillain	ABC
2006	The Sopranos	"The Ride"	Phil Abraham	HBO
2006	24	"Day 5: 9:00 p.m. — 10:00 p.m."	Rodney Charters	Fox
2007	Rome	"Passover"	Alik Sakharov	HBO
2007	CSI: Crime Scene Investigation	"Built to Kill, Part 1"	Michael Slovis	CBS
2007	Deadwood	"The Catbird Seat"	Joseph Gallagher	HBO
2007	The Sopranos	"Soprano Home Movies"	Phil Abraham	HBO
2007	Studio 60 on the Sunset Strip	"Pilot"	Thomas Del Ruth	NBC
Outstanding Cinematography for a Single-Camera Series (One Hour)
2008	Mad Men	"Smoke Gets in Your Eyes"	Phil Abraham	AMC
2008	Battlestar Galactica	"Razor"	Stephen McNutt	Sci Fi
2008	Breaking Bad	"Pilot"	John Toll	AMC
2008	Dexter	"The British Invasion"	Romeo Tirone	Showtime
2008	Lost	"The Constant"	John Bartley	ABC
2008	Rescue Me	"Babyface"	Tom Houghton	FX
2009	The Tudors	"Dissension and Punishment"	Ousama Rawi	Showtime
2009	Breaking Bad	"ABQ"	Michael Slovis	AMC
2009	CSI: Crime Scene Investigation	"For Warrick"	James L. Carter	CBS
2009	Life on Mars	"Out Here in the Fields"	Kramer Morgenthau	ABC
2009	Mad Men	"The New Girl"	Christopher Manley	AMC

=== 2010s ===
Year	Program	Episode	Nominees	Network
2010 (62nd)	CSI: Crime Scene Investigation	"Family Affair"	Christian Sebaldt	CBS
2010 (62nd)	Breaking Bad	"No Mas"	Michael Slovis	AMC
2010 (62nd)	FlashForward	"No More Good Days"	Kramer Morgenthau	ABC
2010 (62nd)	Mad Men	"Shut the Door. Have a Seat."	Christopher Manley	AMC
2010 (62nd)	The Tudors	"Death of a Monarchy"	Ousama Rawi	Showtime
Outstanding Cinematography for a Single-Camera Series
2011 (63rd)	Boardwalk Empire	"Home"	Jonathan Freeman	HBO
2011 (63rd)	Boardwalk Empire	"Boardwalk Empire"	Stuart Dryburgh	HBO
2011 (63rd)	Boardwalk Empire	"A Return to Normalcy"	Kramer Morgenthau	HBO
2011 (63rd)	The Borgias	"The Poisoned Chalice" / "The Assassin"	Paul Sarossy	Showtime
2011 (63rd)	The Good Wife	"Double Jeopardy"	Fred Murphy	CBS
2012 (64th)	Boardwalk Empire	"21"	Jonathan Freeman	HBO
2012 (64th)	Breaking Bad	"Face Off"	Michael Slovis	AMC
2012 (64th)	Glee	"Asian F"	Michael Goi	Fox
2012 (64th)	Mad Men	"The Phantom"	Christopher Manley	AMC
2012 (64th)	Pan Am	"Pilot"	John Lindley	ABC
2013 (65th)	House of Cards	"Chapter 1"	Eigil Bryld	Netflix
2013 (65th)	Boardwalk Empire	"Margate Sands"	Bill Coleman	HBO
2013 (65th)	Breaking Bad	"Gliding Over All"	Michael Slovis	AMC
2013 (65th)	Game of Thrones	"Mhysa"	Robert McLachlan	HBO
2013 (65th)	Homeland	"Beirut is Back"	Nelson Cragg	Showtime
2013 (65th)	Mad Men	"The Doorway"	Christopher Manley	AMC
2014 (66th)	True Detective	"Who Goes There"	Adam Arkapaw	HBO
2014 (66th)	Breaking Bad	"Granite State"	Michael Slovis	AMC
2014 (66th)	Game of Thrones	"The Lion and the Rose"	Anette Haellmigk	HBO
2014 (66th)	Game of Thrones	"Two Swords"	Jonathan Freeman	HBO
2014 (66th)	Homeland	"The Star"	David Klein	Showtime
2014 (66th)	House of Cards	"Chapter 18"	Igor Martinovic	Netflix
2015 (67th)	Boardwalk Empire	"Golden Days for Boys and Girls"	Jonathan Freeman	HBO
2015 (67th)	Game of Thrones	"The Dance of Dragons"	Rob McLachlan	HBO
2015 (67th)	Game of Thrones	"Hardhome"	Fabian Wagner	HBO
2015 (67th)	Game of Thrones	"Sons of the Harpy"	Anette Haellmigk	HBO
2015 (67th)	Game of Thrones	"Unbowed, Unbent, Unbroken"	Gregory Middleton	HBO
2015 (67th)	The Good Wife	"The Line"	Fred Murphy	CBS
2015 (67th)	House of Cards	"Chapter 29"	Martin Ahlgren	Netflix
2016 (68th)	The Man in the High Castle	"The New World"	James Hawkinson	Prime Video
2016 (68th)	Bates Motel	"A Danger to Himself and Others"	John S. Bartley	A&E
2016 (68th)	Downton Abbey	"Episode Nine"	Graham Frake	PBS
2016 (68th)	Game of Thrones	"Home"	Gregory Middleton	HBO
2016 (68th)	Gotham	"Azrael"	Crescenzo Giacomo Notarile	Fox
2016 (68th)	Homeland	"The Tradition of Hospitality"	David Klein	Showtime
2016 (68th)	House of Cards	"Chapter 45"	David M. Dunlap	Netflix
Outstanding Cinematography for a Single-Camera Series (One Hour)
2017 (69th)
2017 (69th)	The Handmaid's Tale	"Offred"	Colin Watkinson	Hulu
2017 (69th)	The Crown	"Smoke and Mirrors"	Adriano Goldman	Netflix
2017 (69th)	The Man in the High Castle	"Fallout"	James Hawkinson	Prime Video
2017 (69th)	Mr. Robot	"eps2.0_unm4sk-pt1.tc" / "eps2.0_unm4sk-pt2.tc"	Tod Campbell	USA
2017 (69th)	Sense8	"Obligate Mutualisms"	John Toll	Netflix
2017 (69th)	Stranger Things	"Chapter Eight: The Upside Down"	Tim Ives	Netflix
2017 (69th)	Westworld	"The Original"	Paul Cameron	HBO
2018 (70th)
2018 (70th)	The Crown	"Beryl"	Adriano Goldman	Netflix
2018 (70th)	The Handmaid's Tale	"June"	Colin Watkinson	Hulu
2018 (70th)	Legion	"Chapter 9"	Dana Gonzales	FX
2018 (70th)	The Marvelous Mrs. Maisel	"Pilot"	M. David Mullen	Prime Video
2018 (70th)	Ozark	"The Toll"	Ben Kutchins	Netflix
2018 (70th)	Stranger Things	"Chapter One: MADMAX"	Tim Ives	Netflix
2018 (70th)	Westworld	"The Riddle of the Sphinx"	John Grillo	HBO
2019 (71st)
2019 (71st)	The Marvelous Mrs. Maisel	"Simone"	M. David Mullen	Prime Video
2019 (71st)	Game of Thrones	"The Iron Throne"	Jonathan Freeman	HBO
2019 (71st)	The Handmaid's Tale	"Holly"	Zoë White	Hulu
2019 (71st)	The Handmaid's Tale	"The Word"	Colin Watkinson	Hulu
2019 (71st)	Hanna	"Forest"	Dana Gonzales	Prime Video
2019 (71st)	The Man in the High Castle	"Jahr Null"	Gonzalo Amat	Prime Video
2019 (71st)	Ray Donovan	"Staten Island, Part 1"	Robert McLachlan	Showtime

=== 2020s ===
Year	Program	Episode	Nominees	Network
2020 (72nd)
2020 (72nd)	The Marvelous Mrs. Maisel	"It's Comedy or Cabbage"	M. David Mullen	Prime Video
2020 (72nd)	The Crown	"Aberfan"	Adriano Goldman	Netflix
2020 (72nd)	Mindhunter	"Episode 6"	Erik Messerschmidt	Netflix
2020 (72nd)	Ozark	"Boss Fight"	Armando Salas	Netflix
2020 (72nd)	Ozark	"Civil Union"	Ben Kutchins	Netflix
2020 (72nd)	Tales from the Loop	"Loop"	Jeff Cronenweth	Prime Video
2020 (72nd)	Westworld	"Parce Domine"	Paul Cameron	HBO
2021 (73rd)
2021 (73rd)	The Crown	"Fairytale"	Adriano Goldman	Netflix
2021 (73rd)	Bridgerton	"Art of the Swoon"	Jeffrey Jur	Netflix
2021 (73rd)	Euphoria	"Trouble Don't Last Always"	Marcell Rév	HBO
2021 (73rd)	Lovecraft Country	"Sundown"	Tat Radcliffe	HBO
2021 (73rd)	The Mandalorian	"Chapter 13: The Jedi"	Baz Idoine	Disney+
2021 (73rd)	Perry Mason	"Chapter Two"	David Franco	HBO
2021 (73rd)	The Umbrella Academy	"Right Back Where We Started"	Neville Kidd	Netflix
2022 (74th)
2022 (74th)	Euphoria	"The Theater and Its Double"	Marcell Rév	HBO
2022 (74th)	Loki	"Lamentis"	Autumn Durald Arkapaw	Disney+
2022 (74th)	The Marvelous Mrs. Maisel	"How Do You Get to Carnegie Hall?"	M. David Mullen	Prime Video
2022 (74th)	Ozark	"A Hard Way to Go"	Eric Koretz	Netflix
2022 (74th)	Squid Game	"Stick to the Team"	Lee Hyung-deok	Netflix
2022 (74th)	Winning Time: The Rise of the Lakers Dynasty	"Pieces of a Man"	Todd Banhazl	HBO
2023 (75th)
2023 (75th)	The Marvelous Mrs. Maisel	"Four Minutes"	M. David Mullen	Prime Video
2023 (75th)	Andor	"Rix Road"	Damián García	Disney+
2023 (75th)	The Crown	"Mou Mou"	Adriano Goldman	Netflix
2023 (75th)	House of the Dragon	"The Lord of the Tides"	Catherine Goldschmidt	HBO
2023 (75th)	The Old Man	"I"	Sean Porter	FX
2023 (75th)	Wednesday	"Woe What a Night"	David Lanzenberg	Netflix
2024 (76th)
2024 (76th)	Shōgun	"Crimson Sky"	Sam McCurdy	FX
2024 (76th)	The Crown	"Ritz"	Sophia Olsson	Netflix
2024 (76th)	The Crown	"Sleep, Dearie Sleep"	Adriano Goldman	Netflix
2024 (76th)	Shōgun	"Anjin"	Christopher Ross	FX
2024 (76th)	3 Body Problem	"Judgment Day"	Martin Ahlgren	Netflix
2024 (76th)	Winning Time: The Rise of the Lakers Dynasty	"Beat L.A."	Todd Banhazl	HBO
2025 (77th)
2025 (77th)	Severance	"Hello, Ms. Cobel"	Jessica Lee Gagné	Apple TV+
2025 (77th)	Andor	"Harvest"	Christophe Nuyens	Disney+
2025 (77th)	The Day of the Jackal	"Episode 1"	Christopher Ross	Peacock
2025 (77th)	Étoile	"The Swap"	M. David Mullen	Prime Video
2025 (77th)	Pachinko	"Chapter Nine"	Ante Cheng	Apple TV+
2025 (77th)	The White Lotus	"Killer Instincts"	Ben Kutchins	HBO
2026 (78th)
2026 (78th)	Spider-Noir	"Step Into My Office"	Darran Tiernan	MGM+ / Prime Video
2026 (78th)	Alien: Earth	"Neverland"	Dana Gonzales	FX
2026 (78th)	Euphoria	"In God We Trust"	Marcell Rév	HBO
2026 (78th)	Margo's Got Money Troubles	"Flamingos"	Tari Segal	Apple TV
2026 (78th)	Pluribus	"We Is Us"	Marshall Adams	Apple TV
2026 (78th)	Task	"Crossings"	Alex Disenhof	HBO

== Programs with multiple awards ==
3 wins

- Boardwalk Empire
- Columbo
- Law & Order
- The Marvelous Mrs. Maisel
- Quantum Leap

2 wins

- The Crown
- CSI: Crime Scene Investigation
- Little House on the Prairie
- Naked City
- The West Wing

== Cinematographers with multiple awards ==
3 wins

- Jonathan Freeman
- Constantine Makris
- M. David Mullen

2 wins

- Thomas Del Ruth
- Adriano Goldman
- Jack Priestley
- William W. Spencer
- Ted Voigtlander
- Roy H. Wagner
- Michael W. Watkins
- Harry L. Wolf

== Programs with multiple nominations ==
9 nominations

- Game of Thrones

7 nominations

- The Crown
- Little House on the Prairie

6 nominations

- Boardwalk Empire
- Breaking Bad
- CSI: Crime Scene Investigation

5 nominations

- Bonanza
- Chicago Hope
- Highway to Heaven
- Law & Order
- Mad Men
- The Marvelous Mrs. Maisel
- Quantum Leap
- The West Wing
- The X-Files

4 nominations

- The Handmaid's Tale
- House of Cards
- JAG
- Kojak
- The Mandalorian (Note: Total includes The Mandalorian's nominations for Outstanding Cinematography for a Single-Camera Series (Half-Hour).)
- Ozark
- The Sopranos

3 nominations

- Alias
- Amazing Stories
- Beauty and the Beast
- Columbo
- Euphoria
- Hawaii Five-O
- Homeland
- The Loretta Young Show
- The Man in the High Castle
- Six Feet Under
- The Twilight Zone
- Westworld

2 nominations

- Ally McBeal
- Andor
- Babylon 5
- Baretta
- Carnivàle
- Deadwood
- Dr. Quinn, Medicine Woman
- Fame
- Fantasy Island
- Four Star Playhouse
- General Electric Theater
- The Good Wife
- Have Gun – Will Travel
- Jake and the Fatman
- Lost

- Magnum, P.I.
- The Man from U.N.C.L.E.
- Marcus Welby, M.D.
- Maverick
- Miami Vice
- Moonlighting
- Naked City
- Northern Exposure
- The Practice
- Roots
- Shōgun
- Star Trek: The Next Generation
- Stranger Things
- The Tudors
- 24
- Wagon Train
- Winning Time: The Rise of the Lakers Dynasty
- The Young Indiana Jones Chronicles

== Cinematographers with multiple nominations ==
13 nominations

- Ted Voigtlander

7 nominations

- Michael Slovis

6 nominations

- Thomas Del Ruth
- M. David Mullen

5 nominations

- Phil Abraham
- Gerald Perry Finnerman
- John C. Flinn III
- Jonathan Freeman
- Adriano Goldman

4 nominations

- John Bartley
- Joseph F. Biroc
- Haskell Boggs
- Hugo Cortina
- Constantine Makris
- Christopher Manley
- William Margulies
- Sol Negrin
- Jack Priestley
- Walter Strenge
- Michael W. Watkins

3 nominations

- Lloyd Ahern
- James R. Bagdonas
- Guy Blanchard
- Michael Bonvillain
- Norbert Brodine
- George T. Clemens
- George E. Diskant
- Dana Gonzales
- William Jurgensen
- Jeffrey Jur
- Ben Kutchins
- Stevan Larner
- Robert McLachlan
- Kramer Morgenthau
- John McPherson
- Woody Omens
- Michael D. O'Shea
- Robert Pittack
- Richard M. Rawlings Jr.
- Marcell Rév
- Howard Schwartz
- William W. Spencer
- Roy H. Wagner
- William F. Whitely
- Harry L. Wolf
- Ralph Woolsey

2 nominations

- Emmett Bergholz
- Edward R. Brown
- Paul Cameron
- Alan Caso
- Rodney Charters
- Robert E. Collins
- Billy Dickson
- John Elsenbach
- Anette Haellmigk
- Robert B. Hauser
- James Hawkinson
- Winton C. Hoch
- Tim Ives
- David Klein
- Fred J. Koenekamp
- Sherman Kunkel
- Enzo A. Martinelli
- Gregory Middleton
- Robert L. Morrison
- Brianne Murphy
- Fred Murphy
- Frank Prinzi
- Ousama Rawi
- Richard L. Rawlings
- Bill Roe
- Christopher Ross
- Marvin V. Rush
- Dennis Smith
- Roland 'Ozzie' Smith
- John Toll
- Jonathan West
- Kenneth Zunder
