= Primetime Emmy Award for Outstanding Cinematography for a Limited or Anthology Series or Movie =

US television award

Primetime Emmy Award for Cinematography for a Limited or Anthology Series or Movie
- Awarded for: Outstanding Cinematography for a Limited or Anthology Series or Movie
- Country: United States
- Presented by: Academy of Television Arts & Sciences
- Currently held by: DTF St. Louis (2026)
- Website: emmys.com

The Primetime Emmy Award for Outstanding Cinematography for a Limited or Anthology Series or Movie is an annual award presented as part of the Primetime Emmy Awards.

== Winners and nominations ==
=== 1970s ===
Year	Program	Episode	Nominees	Network
1970
1970	Ritual of Evil		Lionel Lindon	NBC
1970	The Immortal		Howard R. Schwartz	ABC
1970	My Sweet Charlie		Gene Polito	NBC
1971
1971	Peggy Fleming at Sun Valley		Bob Collins	NBC
1971	Vanished		Lionel Lindon	ABC
1971	The Neon Ceiling		Edward Rosson	NBC
1971	Tribes		Russell L. Metty	ABC
1972
1972	Brian's Song		Joseph F. Biroc	ABC
1972	Duel		Jack A. Marta	ABC
1972	The Snow Goose		Ray Henman	NBC
1973
1973	Night of Terror		Ted Voigtlander	CBS
1973	Liza with a Z		Owen Roizman	NBC
1973	The Red Pony		Andrew Jackson	NBC
1974
1974	It's Good to Be Alive		Ted Voigtlander	CBS
1974	The Man Without a Country		Andrew Laszlo	ABC
1974	The Migrants		Richard C. Kratina	CBS
1974	Portrait: A Man Whose Name Was John		Walter Strenge	ABC
1974	Trapped		Fred Mandl	ABC
1975
1975	Queen of the Stardust Ballroom		David M. Walsh	CBS
1975	Death Be Not Proud		Michael Chapman	ABC
1975	Lincoln	"Sad Figure, Laughing"	Howard Schwartz	NBC
1975	QB VII	"Parts 1 & 2"	Paul Beeson and Robert L. Morrison	ABC
1976
1976	Eleanor and Franklin		Paul Lohmann and Edward R. Brown	ABC
1976	Babe		Charles F. Wheeler	CBS
1976	Farewell to Manzanar		Hiro Narita	NBC
1976	Griffin and Phoenix		Richard C. Glouner	ABC
1976	The Entertainer		James Crabe	NBC
1977
1977	Raid on Entebbe		Bill Butler	NBC
1977	Eleanor and Franklin: The White House Years		James Crabe	ABC
1977	The Loneliest Runner		Ted Voigtlander	NBC
1977	Sybil		Mario Tosi	NBC
1977	Tail Gunner Joe		Ric Waite	NBC
1978
1978	Ziegfeld: The Man and His Women		Gerald Finnerman	NBC
1978	A Family Upside Down		Joseph F. Biroc	NBC
1978	The Ghost of Flight 401		Howard Schwartz	NBC
1978	The Last Tenant		Dennis Dalzell	ABC
1978	The Life and Assassination of the Kingfish		Ric Waite	NBC
1979
1979	Rainbow		Howard Schwartz	NBC
1979	Elvis		Donald M. Morgan	ABC
1979	Ike: The War Years	"Part 2"	Archie R. Dalzell and Freddie Young	ABC
1979	The Winds of Kitty Hawk		Dennis Dalzell	NBC

=== 1980s ===
Year	Program	Episode	Nominees	Network
1980
1980	The Silent Lovers		Gayne Rescher	NBC
1980	Brave New World		Harry L. Wolf	NBC
1980	Kenny Rogers as The Gambler		Joseph F. Biroc	CBS
1980	The Miracle Worker		Ted Voigtlander	NBC
1981
1981	Little Lord Fauntleroy		Arthur Ibbetson	CBS
1981	Bitter Harvest		Gayne Rescher	NBC
1981	The Diary of Anne Frank		Ted Voigtlander	NBC
1981	East of Eden	"Part 2"	Frank Stanley	ABC
1981	Marilyn: The Untold Story		Terry K. Meade	ABC
1981	Shōgun	"Part 4"	Andrew Laszlo	NBC
1982
1982	The Letter		James Crabe	ABC
1982	Marco Polo	"Part 4"	Pasqualino De Santis	NBC
1982	The Princess and the Cabbie		Gayne Rescher	CBS
1983	The Winds of War	"Into the Maelstrom"	Charles Correll and Stevan Larner	ABC
1983	The Blue and the Gray	"Part 3"	Al Francis	CBS
1983	Murder Me, Murder You		Gayne Rescher	CBS
1983	The Thorn Birds	"Part 1"	Bill Butler	ABC
1983	Witness for the Prosecution		Arthur Ibbetson	CBS
1984	A Streetcar Named Desire		Bill Butler	ABC
1984	Celebrity	"Part 3"	Philip H. Lathrop	NBC
1984	The Day After		Gayne Rescher	ABC
1984	George Washington	"Part 2"	Harry Stradling Jr.	CBS
1985	Malice in Wonderland		Philip H. Lathrop	CBS
1985	The Bad Seed		Ted Voigtlander	ABC
1985	A Death in California		Joseph F. Biroc	ABC
1985	Evergreen	"Part 2"	Woody Omens	NBC
1985	Wallenberg: A Hero's Story		Charles Correll	NBC
1986	An Early Frost		Woody Omens	NBC
1986	North and South	"Part 6"	Stevan Larner	ABC
1986	Peter the Great	"Part 3"	Vittorio Storaro	NBC
1986	Picking Up the Pieces		Philip H. Lathrop	CBS
1987	Christmas Snow		Philip H. Lathrop	NBC
1987	The Alamo: 13 Days to Glory		John Elsenbach	NBC
1987	Kojak: The Price of Justice		Victor J. Kemper	CBS
1987	Promise		Gayne Rescher	CBS
1987	There Were Times, Dear		Brianne Murphy	PBS
1988	I Saw What You Did		Woody Omens	CBS
1988	Baby M	"Part 1"	James Crabe	ABC
1988	Inherit the Wind		Stevan Larner	NBC
1988	Little Girl Lost		Philip H. Lathrop	ABC
1989	Shooter		Gayne Rescher	NBC
1989	Disaster at Silo 7		Roy H. Wagner	ABC
1989	Favorite Son	"Part 3"	Bradford May	NBC
1989	Lonesome Dove	"The Return"	Douglas Milsome	CBS
1989	War and Remembrance	"Part 11"	Dietrich Lohmann	ABC

=== 1990s ===
Year	Program	Episode	Nominees	Network
1990	Murder in Mississippi		Donald M. Morgan	NBC
1990	The Final Days		Fred Murphy	ABC
1990	The Operation		John C. Flinn III	CBS
1990	Polly		Isidore Mankofsky	NBC
1990	Where Pigeons Go to Die		Haskell Boggs	NBC
1991	Jackie Collins' Lucky/Chances	"Part 1"	Gayne Rescher	NBC
1991	The Haunted		Michael D. Margulies	Fox
1991	Love, Lies and Murder	"Part 1"	Isidore Mankofsky	NBC
1991	The Whereabouts of Jenny		Jonathan West	ABC
1992	Lady Against the Odds		Brad May	NBC
1992	Afterburn		Isidore Mankofsky	HBO
1992	Doublecrossed		Donald M. Morgan	HBO
1992	Into the Badlands		Johnny E. Jensen	USA
1992	Miss Rose White		Kees Van Oostrum	NBC
1993	Stalin		Vilmos Zsigmond	HBO
1993	An American Story		Johnny E. Jensen	CBS
1993	Jackie Collins' Lady Boss	"Part 1"	Chuck Arnold	NBC
1993	Murder in the Heartland	"Part 1"	Ronald Víctor García	ABC
1993	Sinatra	"Part 1"	Reynaldo Villalobos	CBS
1994	Geronimo		Donald M. Morgan	TNT
1994	Gypsy		Ralf D. Bode	CBS
1994	Return to Lonesome Dove	"Part 2"	Kees Van Oostrum	CBS
1994	Stephen King's The Stand	"Part 1"	Edward J. Pei	ABC
1994	World War II: When Lions Roared	"Part 2"	John A. Alonzo	NBC
1995	My Antonia		Robert Primes	USA
1995	Big Dreams and Broken Hearts: The Dottie West Story		Richard M. Rawlings Jr.	CBS
1995	Family Album		Michael W. Watkins	NBC
1995	My Brother's Keeper		Thomas Del Ruth	CBS
1995	Take Me Home Again		Chuck Arnold	NBC
1996	Rasputin		Elemér Ragályi	HBO
1996	Andersonville		Ric Waite	TNT
1996	Gulliver's Travels		Howard Atherton	NBC
1996	Harrison: Cry of the City		Robert Primes	UPN
1996	Norma Jean & Marilyn		John Thomas	HBO
1996	The Siege at Ruby Ridge	"Part 2"	Donald M. Morgan	CBS
1997	Miss Evers' Boys		Donald M. Morgan	HBO
1997	Gotti		Alar Kivilo	HBO
1997	Hidden in America		James R. Bagdonas	Showtime
1997	In the Gloaming		Frederick Elmes	HBO
1997	To Love, Honor and Deceive		Michael D. O'Shea	ABC
1998	What the Deaf Man Heard		Eric Van Haren Noman	CBS
1998	Buffalo Soldiers		William Wages	TNT
1998	The Day Lincoln Was Shot		Ronald Víctor García	TNT
1998	From the Earth to the Moon	"Can We Do This?"	Gale Tattersall	HBO
1998	George Wallace	"Part 1"	Alan Caso	TNT
1998	Merlin	"Part 1"	Sergey Kozlov	NBC
1999	Winchell		Robbie Greenberg	HBO
1999	Dash and Lilly		Bruce Surtees	A&E
1999	Dr. Quinn Medicine Woman: The Movie		Roland 'Ozzie' Smith	CBS
1999	Lansky		John A. Alonzo	HBO
1999	The '60s	"Part 2"	Michael D. O'Shea	NBC

=== 2000s ===
Year	Program	Episode	Nominees	Network
2000	Introducing Dorothy Dandridge		Robbie Greenberg	HBO
2000	Annie		Ralf D. Bode	ABC
2000	A Christmas Carol		Ian Wilson	TNT
2000	Dirty Pictures		Hiro Narita	Showtime
2000	Witness Protection		Fred Murphy	HBO
2001	Frank Herbert's Dune	"Part 2"	Vittorio Storaro	Sci Fi
2001	Anne Frank: The Whole Story	"Part 2"	Elemér Ragályi	ABC
2001	Conspiracy		Stephen Goldblatt	HBO
2001	For Love or Country: The Arturo Sandoval Story		Donald M. Morgan	HBO
2001	Life with Judy Garland: Me and My Shadows	"Part 1"	James Chressanthis	ABC
2001	61*		Haskell Wexler	HBO
2002	Shackleton	"Part 2"	Henry Braham	A&E
2002	Band of Brothers	"The Last Patrol"	Remi Adefarasin	HBO
2002	James Dean		Robbie Greenberg	TNT
2002	The Mists of Avalon	"Part 1"	Vilmos Zsigmond	TNT
2002	Path to War		Stephen Goldblatt	HBO
2002	Uprising	"Part 2"	Denis Lenoir	NBC
2003	Out of the Ashes		Donald M. Morgan	Showtime
2003	Door to Door		Jan Kiesser	TNT
2003	Hunter: Back in Force		John C. Flinn III	NBC
2003	Hysterical Blindness		Declan Quinn	HBO
2003	Live from Baghdad		Ivan Strasburg	HBO
2004	Something the Lord Made		Donald M. Morgan	HBO
2004	American Family: Journey of Dreams	"Chapter 1: The Wedding"	Reynaldo Villalobos	PBS
2004	And Starring Pancho Villa as Himself		Peter James	HBO
2004	Angels in America	"Perestroika"	Stephen Goldblatt	HBO
2004	Iron Jawed Angels		Robbie Greenberg	HBO
2005	The Life and Death of Peter Sellers		Peter Levy	HBO
2005	Faith of My Fathers		Bill Roe	A&E
2005	The 4400	"Part 1"	Thomas Burstyn	USA
2005	The Five People You Meet in Heaven		Kramer Morgenthau	ABC
2005	Warm Springs		Robbie Greenberg	HBO
2006	Bleak House	"Part 1"	James Chressanthis	PBS
2006	Four Minutes		Melanie Oliver	ESPN2
2006	Into the West	"Dreams and Schemes"	William Wages	TNT
2006	Into the West	"Wheel to the Stars"	Alan Caso	TNT
2006	Mrs. Harris		Steven Poster	HBO
2006	Sleeper Cell	"Al-Faitha"	Robert Primes	Showtime
2007	Bury My Heart at Wounded Knee		David Franco	HBO
2007	Broken Trail	"Part 1"	Lloyd Ahern II	AMC
2007	Jane Eyre	"Part 1"	Mike Eley	PBS
2007	The Path to 9/11	"Part 2"	Joel Ransom	ABC
2007	The Valley of Light		Eric Van Haren Noman	CBS
2008	John Adams	"Independence"	Tak Fujimoto	HBO
2008	The Andromeda Strain	"Part 1"	Jon Joffin	A&E
2008	Bernard and Doris		Mauricio Rubinstein	HBO
2008	The Company	"Part 1"	Ben Nott	TNT
2008	John Adams	"Don't Tread on Me"	Tak Fujimoto and Danny Cohen	HBO
2008	Sense & Sensibility	"Part 1"	Sean Bobbitt	PBS
2009	Little Dorrit	"Part 1"	Lukas Strebel	PBS
2009	Generation Kill	"Combat Jack"	Ivan Strasburg	HBO
2009	Gifted Hands: The Ben Carson Story		John B. Aronson	TNT
2009	Grey Gardens		Mike Eley	HBO
2009	Into the Storm		Michel Amathieu	HBO

=== 2010s ===
Year	Program	Episode	Nominees	Network
2010	Return to Cranford	"Part 2"	Ben Smithard	PBS
2010	The Pacific	"Part 5"	Remi Adefarasin	HBO
2010	The Pacific	"Part 9"	Stephen F. Windon	HBO
2010	The Prisoner	"Checkmate"	Florian Hoffmeister	AMC
2010	You Don't Know Jack		Eigil Bryld	HBO
2011	Downton Abbey	"Episode One"	David Katznelson	PBS
2011	The Kennedys	"Life Sentences"	David Moxness	Reelz
2011	Mildred Pierce	"Part 5"	Edward Lachman	HBO
2011	The Pillars of the Earth	"Legacy"	Attila Szalay	Starz
2011	Too Big to Fail		Kramer Morgenthau	HBO
2012	Great Expectations	"Part 2"	Florian Hoffmeister	PBS
2012	Game Change		Jim Denault	HBO
2012	Hemingway & Gellhorn		Rogier Stoffers	HBO
2012	Sherlock: A Scandal in Belgravia		Fabian Wagner	PBS
2012	Treasure Island	"Part 1"	Ulf Brantås	Syfy
2013	Top of the Lake	"Part 1"	Adam Arkapaw	Sundance
2013	American Horror Story: Asylum	"I Am Anne Frank, Part 2"	Michael Goi	FX
2013	Behind the Candelabra		Peter Andrews	HBO
2013	The Girl		John Pardue	HBO
2013	Parade's End	"Part 5"	Mike Eley	HBO
2014	Sherlock: His Last Vow		Neville Kidd	PBS
2014	Fargo	"Buridan's Ass"	Dana Gonzales	FX
2014	Fargo	"The Crocodile's Dilemma"	Matt Lloyd	FX
2014	Fleming: The Man Who Would Be Bond	"Episode One"	Ed Wild	BBC America
2014	Killing Kennedy		Stephen St. John	Nat Geo
2014	The Normal Heart		Danny Moder	HBO
2015	Bessie		Jeff Jur	HBO
2015	American Horror Story: Freak Show	"Monsters Among Us"	Michael Goi	FX
2015	Houdini	"Part 1"	Karl Walter Lindenlaub	History
2015	The Secret Life of Marilyn Monroe	"Part 1"	Chris Manley	Lifetime
2016	Fargo	"Waiting for Dutch"	Dana Gonzales	FX
2016	Luther		John Conroy	BBC America
2016	The People v. O. J. Simpson: American Crime Story	"From the Ashes of Tragedy"	Nelson Cragg	FX
2016	Sherlock: The Abominable Bride		Suzie Lavelle	PBS
2017
2017	The Night Of	"Ordinary Death"	Fred Elmes	HBO
2017	Big Little Lies	"You Get What You Need"	Yves Bélanger	HBO
2017	Black Mirror: Nosedive		Seamus McGarvey	Netflix
2017	Fargo	"The Law of Vacant Places"	Dana Gonzales	FX
2017	The Young Pope	"Episode 1"	Luca Bigazzi	HBO
2018
2018	Genius: Picasso	"Chapter One"	Mathias Herndl	Nat Geo
2018	The Alienist	"The Boy on the Bridge"	PJ Dillon	TNT
2018	Fahrenheit 451		Kramer Morgenthau	HBO
2018	Godless	"An Incident at Creede"	Steven Meizler	Netflix
2018	Twin Peaks	"Part 8"	Peter Deming	Showtime
2018	USS Callister (Black Mirror)		Stephan Pehrsson	Netflix
2019
2019	Chernobyl	"Please Remain Calm"	Jakob Ihre	HBO
2019	Deadwood: The Movie		Dave Klein	HBO
2019	True Detective	"The Great War and Modern Memory"	Germain McMicking	HBO
2019	When They See Us	"Part 1"	Bradford Young	Netflix

=== 2020s ===
Year	Program	Episode	Nominees	Network
2020
2020	Watchmen	"This Extraordinary Being"	Gregory Middleton	HBO
2020	Defending Jacob	"After"	Jonathan Freeman	Apple TV+
2020	Devs	"Episode 7"	Rob Hardy	FX
2020	The Plot Against America	"Part 1"	Martin Ahlgren	HBO
2020	Watchmen	"Little Fear of Lightning"	Xavier Grobet	HBO
2021
2021	The Queen's Gambit	"End Game"	Steven Meizler	Netflix
2021	Fargo	"East/West"	Dana Gonzales	FX
2021	Mare of Easttown	"Illusions"	Ben Richardson	HBO
2021	Small Axe	"Mangrove"	Shabier Kirchner	Prime Video
2021	The Underground Railroad	"Chapter 9: Indiana Winter"	James Laxton	Prime Video
2022
2022	Dopesick	"Breakthrough Pain"	Checco Varese	Hulu
2022	1883	"1883"	Ben Richardson	Paramount+
2022	1883	"Lightning Yellow Hair"	Christina Alexandra Voros	Paramount+
2022	Gaslit	"Will"	Larkin Seiple	Starz
2022	Moon Knight	"Asylum"	Gregory Middleton	Disney+
2022	Station Eleven	"Wheel of Fire"	Christian Sprenger	HBO Max
2023
2023	Black Bird	"Hand to Mouth"	Natalie Kingston	Apple TV+
2023	Boston Strangler		Ben Kutchins	Hulu
2023	Dead Ringers	"One"	Jody Lee Lipes	Prime Video
2023	George & Tammy	"Stand by Your Man"	Igor Martinović	Showtime
2023	Guillermo del Toro's Cabinet of Curiosities	"The Autopsy"	Anastas Michos	Netflix
2024
2024	Ripley	"V Lucio"	Robert Elswit	Netflix
2024	All the Light We Cannot See	"Episode 4"	Tobias Schliessler	Netflix
2024	Fargo	"The Tragedy of the Commons"	Dana Gonzales	FX
2024	Griselda	"Middle Management"	Armando Salas	Netflix
2024	Lessons in Chemistry	"Little Miss Hastings"	Zachary Galler	Apple TV+
2024	True Detective: Night Country	"Part 6"	Florian Hoffmeister	HBO
2025
2025	Adolescence	"Episode 2"	Matthew Lewis	Netflix
2025	American Primeval	"Episode 1"	Jacques Jouffret	Netflix
2025	Disclaimer	"I"	Emmanuel Lubezki and Bruno Delbonnel	Apple TV+
2025	The Penguin	"Top Hat"	David Franco	HBO
2025	Zero Day	"Episode 2"	John Conroy	Netflix
2026
2026	DTF St. Louis	"Cornhole"	James Whitaker	HBO
2026	Beef	"It Will Stay This Way and You Will Obey"	James Laxton	Netflix
2026	Black Rabbit	"Isle of Joy"	Peter Konczal	Netflix
2026	Death by Lightning	"Destiny of the Republic"	Adriano Goldman	Netflix
2026	Monster: The Ed Gein Story	"Buxom Bird"	Michael Bauman	Netflix

== Programs with multiple nominations ==
6 nominations

- Fargo

3 nominations

- Sherlock

2 nominations

- 1883
- American Horror Story
- Black Mirror
- Into the West
- John Adams
- The Pacific
- True Detective
- Watchmen

== Individuals with multiple wins ==
5 wins

- Donald M. Morgan

3 wins

- Gayne Rescher

2 wins

- Bill Butler
- Robbie Greenberg
- Philip H. Lathrop
- Woody Omens
- Ted Voigtlander

== Individuals with multiple nominations ==
9 nominations

- Donald M. Morgan

8 nominations

- Gayne Rescher

6 nominations

- Ted Voigtlander

5 nominations

- Dana Gonzales
- Robbie Greenberg
- Philip H. Lathrop

4 nominations

- Joseph F. Biroc
- James Crabe

3 nominations

- Bill Butler
- Mike Eley
- Stephen Goldblatt
- Florian Hoffmeister
- Stevan Larner
- Isidore Mankofsky
- Kramer Morgenthau
- Woody Omens
- Robert Primes
- Howard Schwartz
- Ric Waite

2 nominations

- Ralf D. Bode
- Remi Adefarasin
- John A. Alonzo
- Chuck Arnold
- Alan Caso
- James Chressanthis
- John Conroy
- Charles Correll
- Dennis Dalzell
- John C. Flinn III
- David Franco
- Tak Fujimoto
- Ronald Víctor García
- Michael Goi
- Arthur Ibbetson
- Johnny E. Jensen
- Andrew Laszlo
- James Laxton
- Steven Meizler
- Gregory Middleton
- Fred Murphy
- Hiro Narita
- Michael D. O'Shea
- Elemér Ragályi
- Vittorio Storaro
- Ivan Strasburg
- Eric Van Haren Noman
- Kees Van Oostrum
- Reynaldo Villalobos
- William Wages
- Vilmos Zsigmond
