= List of presidents of the American Society of Cinematographers =

The president of the American Society of Cinematographers (ASC) is elected by its governing board. The ASC was organized on December 21, 1918, and elected its first president, Phil Rosen, the following day. Presidents of the ASC serve one-year terms. The current president is Stephen Lighthill, who has served since 2020, having previously served 2012–2013.

== Past presidents ==
- 1918–1921: Philip Rosen
- 1921–1923: Fred Jackman
- 1923–1924: James Van Trees
- 1924–1925: Gaetano Gaudio
- 1925–1926: Homer Scott
- 1926–1928: Daniel B. Clark
- 1928–1929: John W. Boyle
- 1929–1930: John F. Seitz
- 1930–1931: Hal Mohr
- 1931–1937: John Arnold
- 1937–1939: Victor Milner
- 1939–1941: John Arnold

Between 1941 and 1943 there were no presidents of the ASC.

- 1943–1947: Leonard Smith
- 1947–1948: Leon Shamroy
- 1948–1950: Charles G. Clarke
- 1950–1951: Ray Rennahan
- 1951–1953: Charles G. Clarke
- 1953–1954: Arthur Edeson
- 1954–1956: Arthur C. Miller
- 1956–1957: George J. Folsey
- 1957–1958: Burnett Guffey
- 1958–1960: Walter Strenge
- 1960–1961: Lee Garmes
- 1961–1963: William H. Daniels
- 1963–1965: Hal Mohr
- 1965–1966: Ray Rennahan
- 1966–1969: Sol Halperin
- 1969–1970: Hal Mohr
- 1970–1973: Sol Halperin
- 1973–1975: Ernest Laszlo
- 1975–1976: Lester Shorr
- 1977–1978: Linwood G. Dunn
- 1979–1980: William A. Fraker
- 1981–1982: Harry Wolf
- 1983: Ralph Woolsey
- 1984: William A. Fraker
- 1985–1986: Stanley Cortez
- 1987–1988: Harry Wolf
- 1989–1990: Leonard J. South
- 1991–1992: William A. Fraker
- 1993–1996: Victor J. Kemper
- 1997: Owen Roizman
- 1998–1999: Woody Omens
- 1999–2001: Victor J. Kemper
- 2002: Steven B. Poster
- 2003–2004: Richard Crudo
- 2004–2009: Daryn Okada
- 2009–2012: Michael Goi
- 2012–2013: Stephen Lighthill
- 2013–2016: Richard Crudo
- 2016–2020: Kees Van Oostrum
- 2020–2023: Stephen Lighthill
- 2023–Present: Shelly Johnson
