= Ric Waite =

American cinematographer (1933–2012)

- Born: July 10, 1933; Sheboygan, Wisconsin, U.S.
- Died: February 18, 2012 (aged 78); Los Angeles, California, U.S.
- Occupation: Cinematographer

Richard Waite, ASC (July 10, 1933 – February 18, 2012) was an American cinematographer. His notable film credits included The Long Riders, 48 Hrs., Red Dawn, Footloose, Cobra, Adventures in Babysitting, and Rapid Fire. He won a Primetime Emmy Award for Outstanding Cinematography for a Series (One Hour) for his work on the miniseries Captains and the Kings (1976), along with three other nominations.

== Early years ==
Waite was born in Sheboygan, Wisconsin. He enlisted in the United States Air Force after graduation from high school and was a member of the Air Force's Photo Intelligence unit. He moved to New York City, where he owned a studio as a professional photographer. Waite specialized in advertising and fashion photography. His clients included Jaguar Cars, Glamour, Vogue, Hanes, DuPont, and GQ.

In 1970, Waite moved to Los Angeles.

== Career ==
Waite earliest work as a cinematographer was in television, including the 1970s television series Emergency!, City of Angels, and Police Story. He also shot many television films including Tail Gunner Joe in 1977, in which he earned an Emmy nomination; The Life and Assassination of the Kingfish, released in 1977, for which he received another Emmy nomination; Dead of Night and Amateur Night at the Dixie Bar and Grill, which aired in 1979. Waite earned his fourth and final Emmy nomination in 1996 for the television film Andersonville.

Waite's feature film debut as a cinematographer was The Long Riders, a 1980 Western film directed by Walter Hill. His numerous film credits as director of photography included Footloose by Herbert Ross; Red Dawn by John Milius; Brewster's Millions, a 1985 film also by Hill; Summer Rental by director Carl Reiner; Volunteers by Nicholas Meyer; Cobra by George P. Cosmatos; and Adventures in Babysitting by Chris Columbus.

In 2002, Waite moved to the Denver metropolitan area. He taught lighting and cinematography within the film studies department at the University of Colorado Boulder. He shot the independent films Best Ribs in Town and Assassins' Code. He had signed on as the cinematographer for the film Legacy.

== Death ==
Waite died from a heart attack at his home in Los Angeles on February 18, 2012, at the age of 78.

== Filmography ==
=== Film ===
Year	Title	Director	Notes
1971	The Day of the Wolves	Ferde Grofe Jr.	
1974	A Time for Love	Rick Jason	
1974	Goodnight Jackie	Jerry London	
1978	The Other Side of the Mountain Part 2	Larry Peerce	
1980	Defiance	John Flynn	
1980	On the Nickel	Ralph Waite	
1980	The Long Riders	Walter Hill	
1982	The Border	Tony Richardson	
1982	Tex	Tim Hunter	
1982	48 Hrs.	Walter Hill	
1983	Class	Lewis John Carlino	
1983	Uncommon Valor	Ted Kotcheff	Additional photography
1984	Footloose	Herbert Ross	
1984	Red Dawn	John Milius	
1985	Brewster's Millions	Walter Hill	
1985	Summer Rental	Carl Reiner	Also 2nd unit director
1985	Volunteers	Nicholas Meyer	
1986	Blue City	Michelle Manning	Additional photography
1986	Cobra	George P. Cosmatos	
1987	Adventures in Babysitting	Chris Columbus	
1988	The Great Outdoors	Howard Deutch	
1990	Marked for Death	Dwight H. Little	
1991	Out for Justice	John Flynn	
1992	Rapid Fire	Dwight H. Little	
1994	On Deadly Ground	Steven Seagal	
1997	Truth or Consequences, N.M.	Kiefer Sutherland	
1999	Woman Wanted	Kiefer Sutherland	
2000	The Watcher	Joe Charbanic	Additional photography
2004	Fallacy	Jeff Jensen	
2009	Best Ribs in Town	David Mikalson	
2011	Assassins' Code	Lawrence Riggins	With Richard Lerner

=== Television ===
Year	Title	Notes
1973	Police Story	2 episodes
1974	Nakia	Pilot
1974	Temperatures Rising	2 episodes
1974-75	Emergency!	20 episodes
1975-76	Medical Story	4 episodes
1976	City of Angels	12 episodes
1977	Most Wanted	Episode "The Pirate"
1977	Wonder Woman	2 episodes
1980	Freebie and the Bean	Episode "The Seduction of the Bean"
1995	Nowhere Man	4 episodes

TV movies, miniseries, and specials

Year	Title	Director	Notes
1976	Captains and the Kings	Douglas Heyes Allen Reisner	
1977	Tail Gunner Joe	Jud Taylor	
1977	The Life and Assassination of the Kingfish	Robert L. Collins	
1977	Dead of Night	Dan Curtis	
1977	Red Alert	William Hale	
1978	The Initiation of Sarah	Robert Day	
1978	A Question of Guilt	Robert Butler	
1978	Leave Yesterday Behind	Richard Michaels	
1978	A Guide for the Married Woman	Hy Averback	
1979	Amateur Night at the Dixie Bar and Grill	Joel Schumacher	
1979	Charleston	Karen Arthur	
1979	Steeletown	Robert L. Collins	With Gil Hubbs
1979	And Baby Makes Six	Waris Hussein	
1979	Nero Wolfe	Frank D. Gilroy	
1980	The Comeback Kid	Peter Levin	
1980	A Perfect Match	Mel Damski	
1980	Revenge of the Stepford Wives	Robert Fuest	
1980	Baby Comes Home	Waris Hussein	
1983	Dempsey	Gus Trikonis	With Sol Negrin
1985	Midas Valley	Gus Trikonis	
1987	You Ruined My Life	David Ashwell	Segment of The Magical World of Disney
1988	Police Story: Burnout	Michael Switzer	
1993	Last Light	Kiefer Sutherland	
1996	Andersonville	John Frankenheimer	
1997	Last Stand at Saber River	Dick Lowry	
1997	Heart Full of Rain	Roger Young	
1997	Hope	Goldie Hawn	
1998	Money Plays	Frank D. Gilroy	
1999	Absence of the Good	John Flynn	
2000	Ratz	Thom Eberhardt	
2001	A Mother's Fight for Justice	Thomas Rickman	
2001	Love and Treason	Lewis Teague	
2001	The Triangle	Lewis Teague	

== Awards and nominations ==
Award	Year	Category	Title	Result
CableACE Award	1994	Direction of Photography in a Dramatic or Theatrical Special/Movie or Miniseries	Last Light	Nominated
Primetime Emmy Award	1977	Outstanding Cinematography for a Limited or Anthology Series or Movie	Tail Gunner Joe	Nominated
Primetime Emmy Award	1977	Outstanding Cinematography for a Limited or Anthology Series or Movie	The Life and Assassination of the Kingfish	Nominated
Primetime Emmy Award	1977	Outstanding Cinematography for a Series (One Hour)	Captains and the Kings	Won
Primetime Emmy Award	1996	Outstanding Cinematography for a Limited or Anthology Series or Movie	Andersonville	Nominated
