= Gayne Rescher =

American cinematographer

- Born: Jay Gayne Rescher; December 19, 1924; New York City, U.S.
- Died: February 29, 2008 (aged 83); Gig Harbor, Washington, U.S.
- Occupation: Cinematographer
- Parent(s): Jay Rescher (father); Jean Tolley (mother)

Jay Gayne Rescher, A.S.C., (December 19, 1924 – February 29, 2008) was an American cinematographer.

== Early life ==
Rescher was born in New York City. His father Jay Rescher was a cinematographer and union organizer, and his mother Jean Tolley was a silent film actress. For at least some of his youth, he and his family lived on Long Island. After high school, Gayne, served in World War II as a fighter pilot. He studied to be an actor at the American Theater School.

== Career ==
Rescher won three Emmy Awards: for The Scarlett O'Hara War (a.k.a., Moviola 1981), Shooter (1989), and Lucky/Chances (1992).

== Personal life and final years ==
Rescher was married three times. His first wife was Ottilie Kruger, daughter of actor Otto Kruger. His second wife was Darlene Keane, who died of lung cancer. His third wife was Gail Ferguson. He had three daughters (Gaye Rescher Ribble, Dee Dee Rescher and Deborah Jean Rescher Miller) and two grandchildren.

In his final years Rescher resided at Fox Island, Washington. He died at age 83 in nearby Gig Harbor, Washington.

== Selected credits ==
=== Film ===
- A Face in the Crowd (1957)
- Man on a String (1960)
- Murder, Inc. (1960)
- Rachel, Rachel (1968)
- A New Leaf (1971)
- Claudine (1974)
- Norman... Is That You? (1976)
- Star Trek II: The Wrath of Khan (1982)

=== Television ===
- The Third Girl from the Left (1973)
- The Great Niagara (1974)
- Sarah T. - Portrait of a Teenage Alcoholic (1975)
- Dummy (1979)
- Angel on My Shoulder (1980)
- The Princess and the Cabbie (1981)
- Honeyboy (1982)
- The Day After (1983) [DP]
- There Must Be A Pony (1986) [DP]
- Love Among Thieves (1987)
- Windmills of the Gods (1988)
- Get Smart, Again! (1989)
