= James Crabe =

American cinematographer (1931–1989)

- Born: James Aubrey Crabe; August 19, 1931; Los Angeles, California, U.S.
- Died: May 2, 1989 (aged 57); Los Angeles, California, U.S.
- Years active: 1961–1988

James Crabe, A.S.C. (August 19, 1931 – May 2, 1989) was an American cinematographer.

He was a regular collaborator of director John G. Avildsen, known for his work in Rocky and The Karate Kid, as well as other movies from the 1970s and 80s, like The China Syndrome, Night Shift, and Thank God It's Friday.

Crabe was also a two-time Primetime Emmy Award winner, received multiple nominations the ASC Awards, and one from the Academy Awards.

== Biography ==
James Crabe was one of the few openly gay cinematographers in Hollywood. He was nominated for the Academy Award for Best Cinematography for director John G. Avildsen's The Formula (1980). He also photographed Avildsen's films Save the Tiger (1973), W.W. and the Dixie Dancekings (1975), Rocky (1976), The Karate Kid (1984), The Karate Kid Part II (1986), Happy New Year (1987) and For Keeps (1988) as well as Thank God It's Friday (1978), The China Syndrome (1979), and Police Academy 2: Their First Assignment (1985).

He won the Primetime Emmy Award for Outstanding Cinematography for a Limited Series or Movie for The Letter (1982) and was nominated for The Entertainer (1976), Eleanor and Franklin: The White House Years (1977) and his final film Baby M (1988). He won Outstanding Cinematography for a Series for The New Mike Hammer episode "More Than Murder" in 1984.

== Death ==
On May 2, 1989, James Crabe died at his home in Sherman Oaks, Los Angeles, from complications of AIDS at the age of 57. The Karate Kid Part III was dedicated to his memory.

== Filmography ==
=== Film ===
Year	Title	Director	Notes
1962	The Proper Time	Tom Laughlin	
1962	The Soldier	Richard A. Colla	Short film
1964	Everybody Loves It	Phillip Mark	
1965	One Way Wahine	William O. Brown	
1966	Agent for H.A.R.M.	Gerd Oswald	
1970	Zig Zag	Richard A. Colla	
1972	All About Alice	Ray Harrison	Uncredited
1972	The Honkers	Steve Ihnat	
1973	Save the Tiger	John G. Avildsen	
1974	Rhinoceros	Tom O'Horgan	
1975	W.W. and the Dixie Dancekings	John G. Avildsen	
1976	Rocky	John G. Avildsen	
1978	Sextette	Ken Hughes	
1978	Thank God It's Friday	Robert Klane	
1979	The China Syndrome	James Bridges	
1979	Players	Anthony Harvey	
1980	The Baltimore Bullet	Robert Ellis Miller	
1980	How to Beat the High Cost of Living	Robert Scheerer	
1980	The Formula	John G. Avildsen	Nominated- Academy Award for Best Cinematography
1982	Night Shift	Ron Howard	
1984	The Karate Kid	John G. Avildsen	
1985	Police Academy 2: Their First Assignment	Jerry Paris	
1986	The Karate Kid Part II	John G. Avildsen	
1987	Happy New Year	John G. Avildsen	
1988	For Keeps	John G. Avildsen	

=== Television ===
Year	Title	Director	Notes
1964	Hollywood and the Stars	Mel Stuart	Episode "Natalie Wood: Hollywood's Child"
1965-1966	Time-Life Specials: The March of Time	William Kronick; Alan Landsburg	Episodes "Frontiers of the Mind" and "The Longs: A Louisiana Dynasty"
1972	The Last of the Wild Mustangs	Gus Jekel	Documentary short
1984	Paper Dolls	Harry Winer	Episode "Pilot"
1988	Baby M	James Steven Sadwith	Miniseries

Documentary film

Year	Title	Director
1965	The Bold Men	William Friedkin
1965	Pro Football: Mayhem on a Sunday Afternoon	William Friedkin

TV movies

Year	Title	Director
1970	Sole Survivor	Paul Stanley
1970	Lost Flight	Leonard J. Horn
1971	A Step Out of Line	Bernard McEveety
1971	Sweet, Sweet Rachel	Sutton Roley
1973	The Great American Beauty Contest	Robert Day
1974	The Autobiography of Miss Jane Pittman	John Korty
1975	The Entertainer	Donald Wrye
1975	F. Scott Fitzgerald in Hollywood	Anthony Page
1976	The Disappearance of Aimee	Anthony Harvey
1977	Eleanor and Franklin: The White House Years	Daniel Petrie
1978	A Death in Canaan	Tony Richardson
1979	Strangers: The Story of a Mother and Daughter	Milton Katselas
1982	The Letter	John Erman
1983	Two Kinds of Love	Jack Bender
1984	More Than Murder	Gary Nelson
1984	Family Secrets	Jack Hofsiss
1984	Concrete Beat	Robert Butler
1985	The Hugga Bunch	Gus Jekel
1985	The Covenant	Walter Grauman
1986	Long Time Gone	Robert Butler
1986	George Washington II: The Forging of a Nation	William Graham
1986	When the Bough Breaks	Waris Hussein
1987	Deadly Care	David Anspaugh
1987	Code Name: Dancer (aka Her Secret Life)	Buzz Kulik
