= Victor J. Kemper =

American cinematographer (1927–2023)

- Born: Victor Jay Kemper; April 14, 1927; Newark, New Jersey, U.S.
- Died: November 27, 2023 (aged 96); Sherman Oaks, California, U.S.
- Years active: 1967–2006
- Spouse: Claire Kellerman (m. 1953)
- Children: 2

President of the American Society of Cinematographers
- In office 1993–1996
- Preceded by: William A. Fraker
- Succeeded by: Owen Roizman
- In office 1999–2001
- Preceded by: Woody Omens
- Succeeded by: Steven B. Poster

Victor Jay Kemper A.S.C. (April 14, 1927 – November 27, 2023) was an American cinematographer.

== Early life and education ==
Victor Jay Kemper was born in Newark, New Jersey, on April 14, 1927, as the son of Florence (née Freedman) and Louis Kemper.

He was a graduate of Seton Hall University.

== Career ==
As a cinematographer, Kemper collaborated extensively with director Arthur Hiller.

He was a member of the American Society of Cinematographers (ASC), and was its president twice, from 1993 to 1996, and from 1999 to 2001.

Kemper died in Sherman Oaks, Los Angeles, on November 27, 2023, at the age of 96.

== Filmography ==
=== Film ===
Year	Title	Director	Ref.
1970	The Magic Garden of Stanley Sweetheart	Leonard Horn	
1970	Husbands	John Cassavetes	
1971	They Might Be Giants	Anthony Harvey	
1971	Who Is Harry Kellerman and Why Is He Saying Those Terrible Things About Me?	Ulu Grosbard	
1971	The Hospital	Arthur Hiller	
1972	The Candidate	Michael Ritchie	
1972	Last of the Red Hot Lovers	Gene Saks	
1973	Shamus	Buzz Kulik	
1973	The Friends of Eddie Coyle	Peter Yates	
1973	Gordon's War	Ossie Davis	
1973	From the Mixed-Up Files of Mrs. Basil E. Frankweiler	Fielder Cook	
1974	The Gambler	Karel Reisz	
1975	The Reincarnation of Peter Proud	J. Lee Thompson	
1975	Dog Day Afternoon	Sidney Lumet	
1976	Stay Hungry	Bob Rafelson	
1976	The Last Tycoon	Elia Kazan	
1976	Mikey and Nicky (Note: Shared credit with Bernie Abramson)	Elaine May	
1977	Slap Shot	George Roy Hill	
1977	Audrey Rose	Robert Wise	
1977	Oh, God!	Carl Reiner	
1978	Coma	Michael Crichton	
1978	The One and Only	Carl Reiner	
1978	Eyes of Laura Mars	Irvin Kershner	
1978	Magic	Richard Attenborough	
1979	...And Justice for All	Norman Jewison	
1979	The Jerk	Carl Reiner	
1980	Night of the Juggler	Robert Butler	
1980	The Final Countdown	Don Taylor	
1980	Xanadu	Robert Greenwald	
1981	The Four Seasons	Alan Alda	
1981	Chu Chu and the Philly Flash	David Lowell Rich	
1982	Partners	James Burrows	
1982	Author! Author!	Arthur Hiller	
1983	Mr. Mom	Stan Dragoti	
1983	Vacation	Harold Ramis	
1984	The Lonely Guy	Arthur Hiller	
1984	Cloak & Dagger	Richard Franklin	
1985	Secret Admirer	David Greenwalt	
1985	Pee-wee's Big Adventure	Tim Burton	
1985	Clue	Jonathan Lynn	
1987	Walk Like a Man	Melvin Frank	
1988	Hot to Trot	Michael Dinner	
1988	Cohen and Tate	Eric Red	
1989	See No Evil, Hear No Evil	Arthur Hiller	
1990	Crazy People	Tony Bill	
1991	F/X2	Richard Franklin	
1991	Another You	Maurice Phillips	
1991	Married to It	Arthur Hiller	
1992	Beethoven	Brian Levant	
1995	Tommy Boy	Peter Segal	
1996	Eddie	Steve Rash	
1996	Jingle All the Way	Brian Levant	

Direct-to-video

Year	Title	Director
2005	American Pie Presents: Band Camp	Steve Rash
2006	Bring It On: All or Nothing	Steve Rash

=== Television ===
TV movies

Year	Title	Director
1977	The Prince of Central Park	Harvey Hart
1987	Kojak: The Price of Justice	Alan Metzger
2001	On Golden Pond	Ernest Thompson; Marty Pasetta

Miniseries

Year	Title	Notes
1985	The Atlanta Child Murders	John Erman
1999	Too Rich: The Secret Life of Doris Duke	John Erman

== Awards and nominations ==
Year	Institution	Category	Title	Result
1987	Primetime Emmy Awards	Outstanding Cinematography for a Miniseries or a Special	Kojak: The Price of Justice	Nominated
1988	American Society of Cinematographers	Outstanding Cinematography in Mini-Series or Specials	Kojak: The Price of Justice	Nominated
1998	American Society of Cinematographers	Lifetime Achievement Award	—	Won
