= Owen Roizman =

American cinematographer (1936–2023)

- Born: September 22, 1936; New York City, U.S.
- Died: January 6, 2023 (aged 86); Los Angeles, California, U.S.
- Years active: 1970–2020
- Spouse: Mona Lindholm (m. 1964)
- Children: 1

President of the American Society of Cinematographers
- In office 1997–1998
- Preceded by: Victor J. Kemper
- Succeeded by: Woody Omens

Owen Roizman (September 22, 1936 – January 6, 2023) was an American cinematographer, nominated five times for the Academy Award for Best Cinematography.

He served on the Board of Governors of the Academy of Motion Picture Arts and Sciences and was president of the American Society of Cinematographers.

== Early life ==
Roizman was raised in Brooklyn, and as a child, he wanted to be a baseball player, physicist, or mathematician. He had a tryout with the New York Yankees but contracted polio as a teenager.

His father, Sol, was a cameraman for Movietone News, and upon hearing about the film industry's possible wages, Roizman decided, "I'm going for the money!" He began working during summer breaks at a camera rental store in New York City and later was an assistant to cinematographer Gerald Hirschfeld at MPO Videotronics.

== Career ==
After creating several television commercials, Roizman made his feature film debut in 1970 with Stop. His second film, William Friedkin's The French Connection (1971), earned him a nomination for the Academy Award for Best Cinematography. The film set the style for many of his future films, with "gritty New York street photography" and available light.

Throughout his career, he garnered a total of five nominations for Best Cinematography.

His final film was Lawrence Kasdan's French Kiss (1995).

Roizman was a member of the Board of Governors of the Academy of Motion Picture Arts and Sciences from 2002 to 2011, representing the Cinematographers Branch, and was a member of the American Society of Cinematographers (ASC). Roizman was ASC president from 1997 to 1998 and served on its board. He received an Academy Honorary Award at the 9th Governors Awards ceremony in 2017.

== Personal life and death ==
Roizman lived in the Encino neighborhood of Los Angeles with his wife, Mona. They had a son, Eric, who became a camera operator.

On January 6, 2023, Roizman died under hospice care at his home at the age of 86.

== Filmography ==
Film

Year	Title	Director
1970	Stop!	Bill Gunn
1971	The French Connection	William Friedkin
1971	The Gang That Couldn't Shoot Straight	James Goldstone
1972	Play It Again, Sam	Herbert Ross
1972	The Heartbreak Kid	Elaine May
1973	The Exorcist	William Friedkin
1974	The Taking of Pelham One Two Three	Joseph Sargent
1975	The Stepford Wives	Bryan Forbes
1975	Three Days of the Condor	Sydney Pollack
1976	The Return of a Man Called Horse	Irvin Kershner
1976	Network	Sidney Lumet
1978	Straight Time	Ulu Grosbard
1978	Sgt. Pepper's Lonely Hearts Club Band	Michael Schultz
1979	The Electric Horseman	Sydney Pollack
1980	The Black Marble	Harold Becker
1981	True Confessions	Ulu Grosbard
1981	Absence of Malice	Sydney Pollack
1981	Taps	Harold Becker
1982	Tootsie	Sydney Pollack
1985	Vision Quest	Harold Becker
1990	I Love You to Death	Lawrence Kasdan
1990	Havana	Sydney Pollack
1991	The Addams Family	Barry Sonnenfeld
1991	Grand Canyon	Lawrence Kasdan
1994	Wyatt Earp	Lawrence Kasdan
1995	French Kiss	Lawrence Kasdan

Short film

Year	Title	Director
1976	Independence	John Huston

Television

Year	Title	Director	Notes
1972	Liza with a Z	Bob Fosse	Concert film
2020	Cine Chalom	Yossi Benavraham	Episode "EXTRAIT DU FILM "LES TROIS JOURS DU CONDOR" DE SYDNEY POLLACK... 1975"

Ref.:

== Awards and nominations ==
Academy Awards

Year	Title	Category	Result
1971	The French Connection	Best Cinematography	Nominated
1973	The Exorcist	Best Cinematography	Nominated
1976	Network	Best Cinematography	Nominated
1982	Tootsie	Best Cinematography	Nominated
1994	Wyatt Earp	Best Cinematography	Nominated
2017	Academy Honorary Award		Won

American Society of Cinematographers

Year	Category	Title	Result	Ref.
1994	Outstanding Achievement in Cinematography	Wyatt Earp	Nominated	
1997	Lifetime Achievement Award		Won	

Other awards

Year	Award	Category	Title	Result	Ref.
1972	Primetime Emmy Awards	Outstanding Cinematography for a Limited Series or Movie	Liza with a Z	Nominated	
2000	Palm Springs International Film Festival	Career Achievement Award		Won	
2001	Camerimage	Lifetime Achievement Award		Won	
2011	Ojai Film Festival	Lifetime Achievement Award (shared with Mitzi Gaynor)		Won	
