= Rodney Charters =

New Zealand cinematographer (1945–2026)

- Born: Rodney Harland Charters; 25 November 1945; New Zealand
- Died: 13 September 2026 (aged 80); Amsterdam, Netherlands
- Occupation: Cinematographer

Rodney Harland Charters (25 November 1945 – 13 September 2026) was a New Zealand cinematographer. He was nominated for two Primetime Emmy Awards in the category Outstanding Cinematography for his work on the television program 24. He was the cinematographer for the films Kull the Conqueror (1997) and Going in Style (2017).

Charters died in Amsterdam on 13 September 2026, at the age of 80.
