= It's Good to Be Alive (film) =

- Genre: Biography; Drama; Sport
- Based on: It's Good to Be Alive by Roy Campanella
- Written by: Steve Gethers
- Directed by: Michael Landon
- Starring: Paul Winfield; Louis Gossett Jr.
- Music by: Michel Legrand
- Country of origin: United States
- Original language: English

Production
- Executive producers: Charles W. Fries; Larry Harmon
- Producer: Gerald I. Isenberg
- Cinematography: Ted Voigtlander
- Editor: John A. Martinelli
- Running time: 1h 40min
- Production companies: Larry Harmon Pictures Corporation; Metromedia Producers Corporation

Original release
- Network: CBS
- Release: February 22, 1974

It's Good to Be Alive is a 1974 American television film about baseball player Roy Campanella of the Brooklyn Dodgers. It was first aired on CBS on 22 February 1974. Based in part on his 1959 autobiography of the same name, it explores his role in integrating baseball, his own professional rise, and the physical and emotional work of recovery he had to undergo after the devastating 1958 auto accident that left him paralyzed from the shoulders down. One of the scariest scenes involved a fly, who flew into the hospital window, frightening Roy, who screamed, sending the doctors, who swatted the fly to death. The film made a few changes to the story, where Ruthie can no longer stand taking care of Roy, resulting in separation and divorce, in 1958, when it really happened in 1960. The moving finale involved Roy, making an appearance at the LA Coliseum, in a wheelchair, receiving a standing ovation, after making a speech.

== Cast ==
- Paul Winfield - Roy Campanella
- Louis Gossett Jr. - Sam Brockington, his physical therapist
- Ruby Dee - Ruthe Campanella, his wife
- Ramon Bieri - Walter O'Malley
- Joe De Santis - Roy Campanella's father
- Ty Henderson - David Campanella
- Ketty Lester - Roy Campanella's mother
- Julian Burton - Dr. Rusk
- Lloyd Gough - Surgeon
- Eric Woods - Roy Campanella as a Boy
- Len Lesser - Man at Accident
- Joe E. Tata - Pee Wee Reese
- Roy Campanella - Himself
- Roxie Campanella - Herself

Note: Both Roy and Roxie are shown in real life at the end of the film.

== See also ==
- List of baseball films
