= 12 O'Clock High (TV series) =

American military drama TV series (1964–1967)

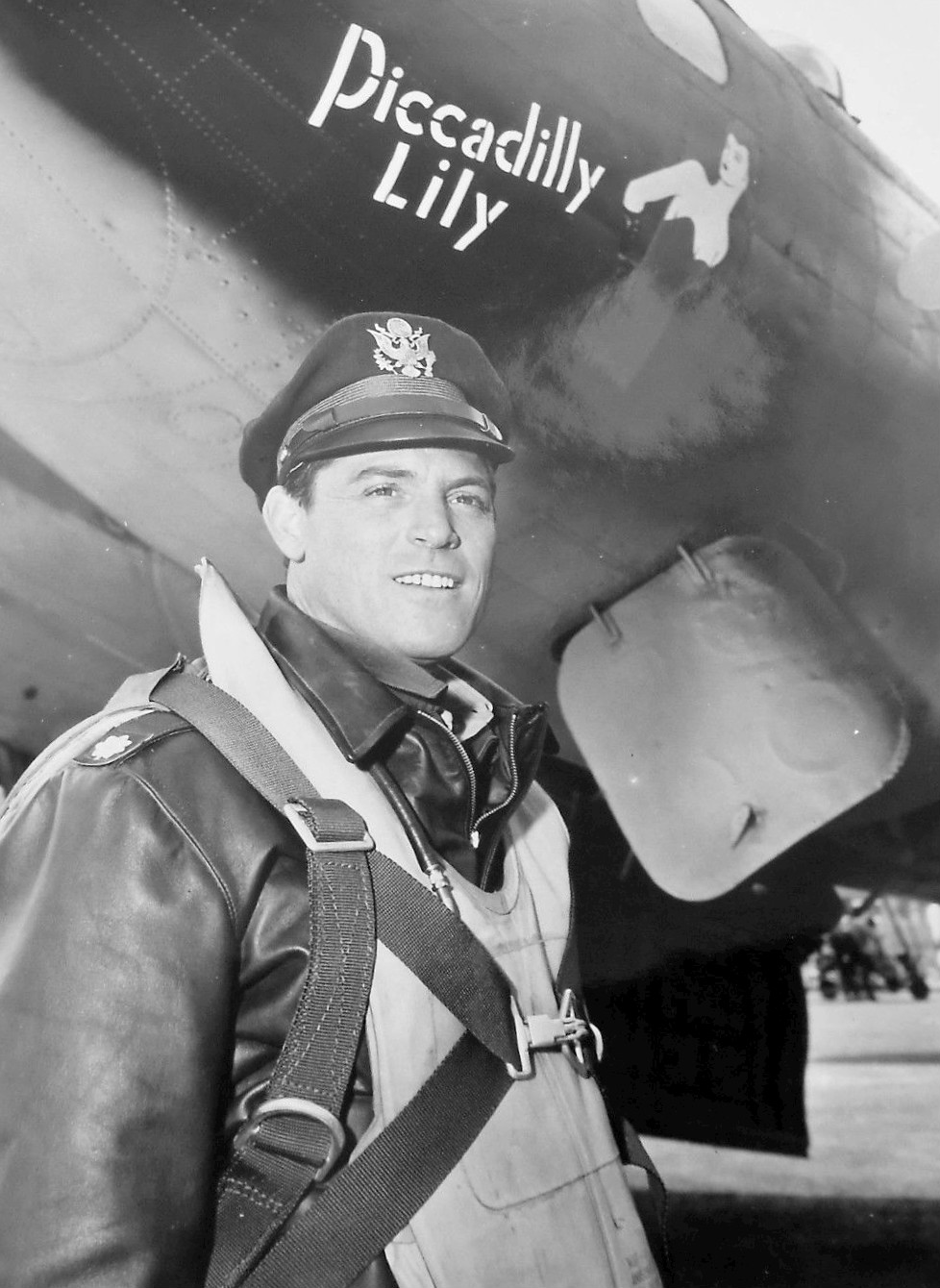
- Paul Burke as Joe Gallagher, 1965
- Genre: Military drama
- Created by: Sy Bartlett; Beirne Lay Jr.
- Starring: Robert Lansing; Frank Overton; Paul Burke; Chris Robinson; Barney Phillips
- Theme music composer: Dominic Frontiere
- Composers: Dominic Frontiere; Fred Steiner (one episode)
- Country of origin: United States
- Original language: English
- No. of seasons: 3
- No. of episodes: 78

Production
- Executive producer: Quinn Martin
- Producers: Frank Glicksman; William D. Gordon
- Cinematography: William W. Spencer; Frank V. Phillips; Robert C. Moreno; Kenneth Peach; Paul C. Vogel; Gene Polito; Meredith Merle Nicholson; George T. Clemens; Carl E. Guthrie; Richard H. Kline
- Running time: 51 minutes
- Production companies: 20th Century-Fox Television; QM Productions

Original release
- Network: ABC
- Release: September 18, 1964 – January 13, 1967

Related
- Twelve O'Clock High

12 O'Clock High is an American military drama television series set in World War II. It was originally broadcast on ABC-TV for three seasons from September 1964 through January 1967 and was based on the 1949 film of the same name. The series was a co-production of 20th Century Fox Television (Fox had also produced the movie) and QM Productions (one of their few non-law-enforcement series). This show is one of the two QM shows not to display a copyright notice at the beginning, but rather at the end (the other was A Man Called Sloane) and the only one not to display the standard "A QM Production" closing card on the closing credits.

== Overview ==
The series follows the missions of the fictitious 918th Bombardment Group (Heavy) of the U.S. Army Air Forces (USAAF), equipped with B-17 Flying Fortress heavy bombers, stationed at Archbury Field, England (a fictitious air base). For the first season, many of the characters from the book and 1949 movie were retained, including Brigadier General Frank Savage, Major Harvey Stovall, Major Cobb, Doc Kaiser, and General Pritchard, albeit played by different actors from in the motion picture. In addition to these characters, several other infrequently reappearing characters were introduced, including Captain (later Colonel) Joseph "Joe" Gallagher, who appeared in two episodes (episodes 1 and 24) as well as being the central character for seasons two and three.

At the end of the first season, the studio executives decided a younger-looking lead actor was needed. In the first episode of the second season, General Savage, played by Robert Lansing, was killed in action and replaced by Colonel Joe Gallagher, played by Paul Burke. (Burke, though considered more youthful-looking than Lansing, was actually two years older, which TV critics were quick to point out.) The decision to replace Lansing with Burke proved unpopular and the ratings began to drop quickly.

The character Joe Gallagher's father was Lt. General Maxwell Gallagher, played by Barry Sullivan. Burke and Sullivan had previously worked together in the TV series Harbourmaster. In an interview given by Lansing on The Mike Douglas Show in 1965, Lansing mentioned that had he known what a boost to his career 12 O'Clock High was, he never would have fired himself. Savage was killed off in a way so as not to require Lansing's participation. According to TV Guide, ABC moved the show from a 10:00 pm Friday time slot to a 7:30 pm Monday time slot for the second season to capture a younger audience. It was hoped that TV viewers would identify more with a colonel rather than an Army Air Corps general. Lansing, had he remained, would have received limited air time with Burke's addition.

For the second season, most of the supporting cast from the first season was replaced, with the exception of Major Stovall, Doc Kaiser, and an occasional appearance by General Pritchard. Other actors who did reappear after the first season played other characters. Edward Mulhare appeared twice – as different Luftwaffe officers. Bruce Dern appeared four times as three different characters. Tom Skerritt appeared five times, each time in a different role.

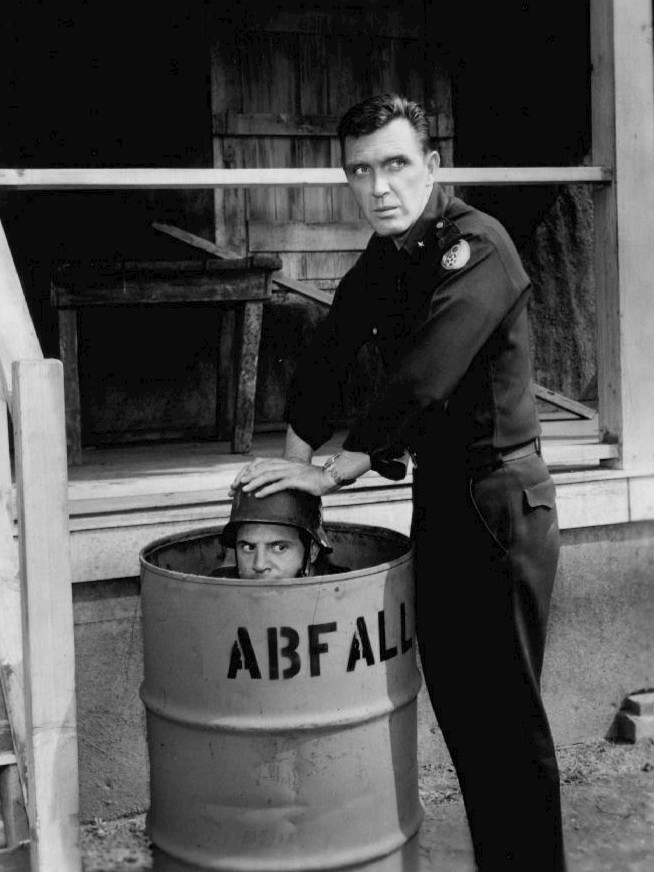
Lansing (top) with Don Penny (left) in 1965

The first two seasons were filmed in black-and-white, as ABC did not mandate prime time shows to be in color until the 1966-1967 season, but it also allowed the inclusion of actual World War II combat footage supplied by the U.S. Air Force and the library of 20th Century Fox movies. The inclusion of combat footage was often obvious, as it was often quite degraded. Limited usable combat footage often resulted in the same shot being reused in multiple episodes. For the third season, the TV series was filmed in color, but this season only ran for 17 episodes, with the series being canceled in midseason. Some of the combat footage used for the third season seemed to be in black-and-white footage tinted blue. Film footage from the 1940s was also used for take-offs and landings since the one B-17 to which the show had access could only taxi. To simulate different aircraft, it was frequently repainted.

In later episodes, Gallagher flew as "mission control" in a North American P-51 Mustang. This plot scheme was added to cut production costs. The single-engine Mustang costs less to fly than the four-engined B-17, and requires only a single pilot rather than two pilots and several crewmen. A wartime precedent for this existed, however: Maj.-Gen. Earle E. Partridge, the G-3 (operations) commander of the 8th Air Force, used a P-51 modified for photo-reconnaissance work to take photographs of his bomber group formations for training and critiquing purposes.

12 O'Clock High was created in an episodic format, with no particular order for the episodes. A trio of episodes produced about a shuttle air raid to North Africa was in fact never aired in story order (episode 44 "We're Not Coming Back", episode 37 "Big Brother", and episode 38 "The Hotshot"). The stories were often based more on character drama than action, usually involving individuals who felt the need to redeem themselves in the eyes of others. Other story lines focused on actual war events, such as the development of bombing through cloud cover using radar, and the complexities of operating a large fleet of (often malfunctioning) B-17s.

Much of the filming was carried out on the Chino Airport, just east of Los Angeles County, California, in San Bernardino County. Chino had been a USAAF training field for World War II, and its combination of long, heavy-duty runways and (at the time) wide-open farmland for miles in all directions was rapidly turning the field into a haven for World War II aviation enthusiasts and their restored aircraft. Former Army Air Forces P-51 Mustangs, Republic P-47 Thunderbolts, Lockheed P-38 Lightnings, B-26 Invaders, and former U.S. Navy and U.S. Marine Corps F4U Corsairs and F6F Hellcats could be found, along with a vintage B-17 and the P-51 Mustang used in 12 O'Clock High.

The B-17 belonged to Ed Maloney's Air Museum, B-17E, F, and G models of the Flying Fortress (the latter with the chin turret) were used interchangeably. The inclusion of actual combat and crash footage often resulted in the tail designations of the bombers changing between film shots.

The segments in 1966 had the former Royal Canadian Air Force pilot Lynn Garrison coordinating the aerial footage. Garrison had been drawn to the project by his friend Robert Lansing. Garrison owned the P-51 used in the series.

As of February 2020, the Heroes & Icons channel broadcasts the series as part of its Saturday-night lineup.

All three seasons are on YouTube.

== Cast ==
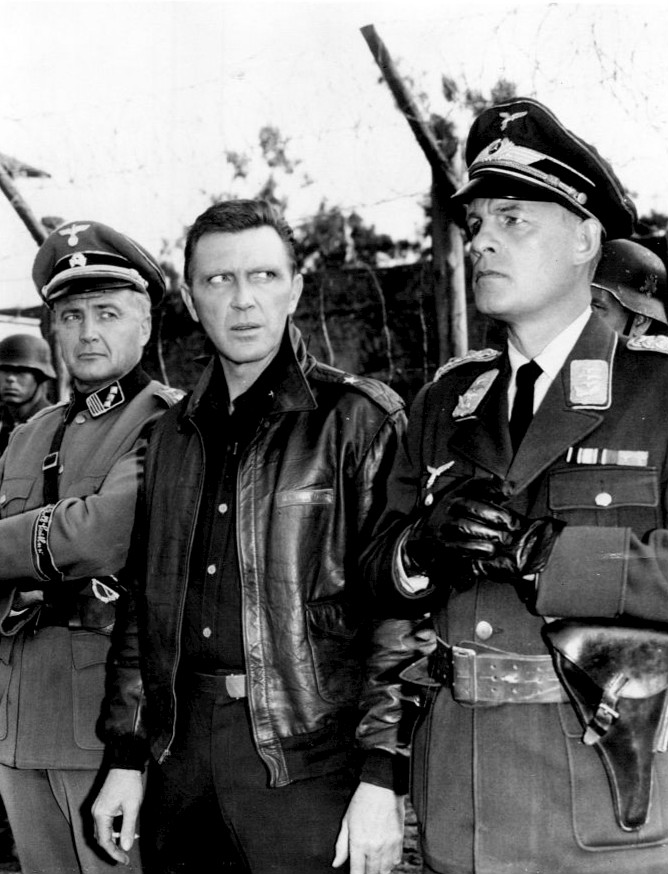
John van Dreelen, Robert Lansing and Alf Kjellin in 1965

- Robert Lansing as Brigadier General Frank Savage (season 1)
- Frank Overton as Major Harvey Stovall
- Paul Burke as Colonel Joe Gallagher (seasons 2 and 3, two appearances in season 1)
- Chris Robinson as T/Sgt. Alexander "Sandy" Komansky (seasons 2 and 3)
- John Larkin as Major General Wiley Crowe (season 1)
- Barney Phillips as Major "Doc" Kaiser
- Andrew Duggan as Brigadier/Major General Ed Britt (seasons 2 and 3)
- Paul Newlan as Lieutenant General Bill Pritchard
- Lew Gallo as Major Joe Cobb (season 1)
- Robert Dornan as Lieutenant/Captain Fowler (seasons 2 and 3, in real life a former USAF fighter pilot)

== Episodes ==
=== Season 1 (1964–65) ===
All episodes in black-and-white

No. overall	No. in season	Title	Directed by	Written by	Original release date
1	1	"Golden Boy Had 9 Black Sheep"	Don Medford	Al C. Ward	September 18, 1964
General Savage believes that Captain Gallagher, a member of a military family, is too quick to abort missions at the first sign of engine trouble, and often complains. Savage rides Gallagher hard and chews him out, assigning him a crew of slackers and misfits and ordering Gallagher to paint the name "Leper Colony" on his plane. Gallagher must turn his crew into an efficient outfit and prove himself, but he despises Savage and wants to do anything to get a transfer. Guest Stars: Paul Burke as Capt. Joe Gallaher, Joby Baker as Lt. Blake, and Bruce Dern as Lt. Michaels.
2	2	"Follow the Leader"	William Graham	Beirne Lay, Jr.	September 25, 1964
Wanting to try a new technique, Savage decides to have the whole bomb group drop on their best bombardier, Lt. Mellon. When Mellon releases his bombs prematurely on the next mission, the entire group accidentally destroy a Dutch school, leaving him devested. After Savage finds out the mess was due to flak hitting the salvo switch, causing the malfunction, he decides to try his new plan again, but can Mellon believe and overcome the guilt. Guest Stars: Andrew Prine as Lt. Bob Mellon.
3	3	"The Men and the Boys"	William Graham	Harold Jack Bloom	October 2, 1964
Savage decides to court martial Capt. Wade Richie, who disobeyed orders and broke formation to provide air cover for a crew bailing out of a plane, including his best friend, Lt. Tom Lockridge, creating much anger. After being found guilty at his court martial, Richie is demoted and made Savage's co-pilot so Savage can keep an eye on him, as he can't trust him with a crew. When Richie's right waist gunner Sgt. Jonesy dies of wounds he sustained during Richie's stunt, Lockridge realizes that Richie had put his own crew in danger to save his, and realizes Richie killed him. When Savage is wounded on the next mission, leaving his plane crippled, Lockridge is forced to abandon Savage and Richie for the safety of the group, despite Richie yelling at him. Guest Stars: Glenn Corbett as Lt. Tom Lockridge, Lou Antonio as Capt. Wade Richie, Sally Kellerman as Lt. Libby MacAndrews, and Hazel Court as Liz Woodruff.
4	4	"The Sound of Distant Thunder"	Don Medford	Edward J. Lasko	October 16, 1964
A new but goofy bombardier Lt. named Andy Lathrop is assigned to Savage's crew, but always hits his mark dead center, but later finds out the hard way, that real people are killed when bombs drop. Guest Stars: Peter Fonda as Lt. Andy Lathrop, and Jill Haworth as Mary Jean.
5	5	"The Climate of Doubt"	Don Medford	Harold Jack Bloom	October 23, 1964
Gen. Crowe orders Savage to fly a dangerous mission in France to show support for the resistance, but he thinks it's because he's in love with a beautiful fighter there. When flying the mission, which requires two bomb targets, the 918th comes under heavy attack from flak and fighters, with a loss of 94 men killed or missing, leaving Savage angry and devastated, and putting Gen. Crowe on court martial for his orders. Guest Stars: Vivica Lindfors as Nicole Trouchard, and Bernard Fox as Col. Charles.
6	6	"Pressure Point"	William Graham	John T. Dugan	October 30, 1964
Savage outfits some of his planes with bigger guns to try to reduce heavy losses, but if U.S senator Clayton Johnson (Who has a history with Savage, as Savage wanted to marry his daughter) remains unconvinced he could lose his command. On top of this, Savage has to deal with belly gunner Sgt. Eddie Pryor, who's made him out to be a villain by not putting in a request to marry his pregnant girlfriend April Barrett, due to his worry of marrying her and getting killed. Guest Stars: Larry Gates as Senator Clayton Johnson, Robert Doyle as Sgt. Eddie Pryor, and Elen Willard as April Barrett.
7	7	"The Decision"	William Graham	Story by : Clair Huffaker; Teleplay by : Clair Huffaker & Jack Turley	November 6, 1964
While flying on a mission, Savage's close friend Maj. Jack Temple is shot down and captured, along with half his crew, and held as hostages in a combat area to prevent Savage from bombing valuable equipment. After some thinking, and looking at photos captured from a recon plane, Savage puts together an idea to save Temple and his crew, before the 918th bomb the whole area on Gen. Crowe's orders. Guest Stars: Tim O'Connor as Maj. Jack Temple, John van Dreelan as, Jack Betts as Lt. Kinner, and Buck Taylor as Cpl. Moody.
8	8	"The Hours Before Dawn"	Don Medford	Donald S. Sanford	November 13, 1964
Savage takes cover in a British mansion during an air raid, but becomes trapped by a downed German colonel also taking cover there. The cynical and manipulative female owner is unsympathetic to both. Guest Stars: Glynis Johns as Jennifer Heath, and Fritz Weaver as Col. Peter Raff.
9	9	"Appointment At Liege"	Don Medford	Story by : John McGreevey; Teleplay by : Charles Larson	November 20, 1964
Maj. Gus Denver, who was assigned elsewhere when his crew was killed in combat, suffers a guilt complex and becomes reckless with his missions and the lives of his subordinates. After his actions get men killed unnecessary and failing to check on safety equipment, Savage grounds him, and soon the man realizes his actions and cracks up. Guest Stars: Gary Lockwood as Maj. Gus Denver,Nancy Kovack as Lt. Cooper, and Hazel Court as Liz Woodruff.
10	10	"Interlude"	William Graham	Dean Riesner	November 27, 1964
Suffering from fatigue, General Savage is ordered to take leave and decides to pay a visit to sunny Scotland. On his way, he repeatedly bumps into a female British officer, Ann Macrae, who is returning to her home - accidental encounters that become increasingly awkward. Naturally, their animosity slowly turns to grudging tolerance, and then to fondness on the way to true affection. Against his better judgment, Savage finds himself falling in love, and Macrae is caught in the same web. Unfortunately, she is hiding a secret that will cast a terrible shadow over their budding relationship. Guest Stars: Dana Wynter as Ann Macrae and Rhys Williams as Adam Macrae.
11	11	"Here's to Courageous Cowards"	Don Medford	Al C. Ward	December 4, 1964
Savage has to handle a Major named Joe Morse, who's burning himself out after 35 missions, and a conscientious objector corporal named Ross Lawrence, who still joined the Air Force, and stowed away on a mission to see what war's like. Guest Stars: Brandon deWilde as Corporal Ross Lawrence, and Gerald O'Loughlin as Maj. Joe Morse.
12	12	"Soldiers Sometimes Kill"	Sutton Roley	Story by : Edmund H. North; Teleplay by : Edmund H. North & Charles Larson	December 11, 1964
Savage is suspected by Scotland Yard of killing a pretty model in her flat and even he cannot remember all the events of that night. Guest Stars: John Williams as Inspector Throne, Murray Matheson as Nicholas Redgrave, and Victoria Shaw as Barbara Talbot.
13	13	"The Suspected"	Don Medford	Story by : Ken Pettus; Teleplay by : Jack Turley & Charles Larson	December 18, 1964
A reporter on the airbase is bent on trying to prove that one of Gen. Savage's gunners, is an escaped convicted murderer. Guest Stars: Michael Callan as Sgt. Driscoll, Edward Binns as Cillford Moran, and Antoinette Bower as Meg Driscoll.
14	14	"An Act of War"	William Graham	Donald S. Sanford	December 25, 1964
Savage is shot down on a vital recon mission in France, kills a Frenchman in self defense, and gets captured by French people who hate bomber crews for killing people, who plan to lynch him. Guest Stars: Norman Fell as Lt. Canello, John Kerr as Maj. Herrick, and Michael Davis as Paul Cadol.
15	15	"Those Who Are About to Die"	Abner Biberman	Harold Jack Bloom	January 1, 1965
Savage's elite squadron is picked for a dangerous, top secret bomb run, but his men start to crack waiting for fog to lift over the English Channel, while they are confined to base. One of his best pilots, Lt. Lockridge, is recovering from hepatitis, waiting to complete his 25th mission, which will get him sent back to the U.S. Savage and nurse Lt. Libby MacAndrews, who loves Lockridge, debate: is Lockridge malingering, pretending to be A-OK, or is he too ill to fly on the mission in which 1/3 are expected not to come back from? Guest Stars: Glenn Corbett as Lt. Tom Lockridge, and Sally Kellerman as Lt. Libby MacAndrews.
16	16	"In Search of My Enemy"	Don Medford	Story by : Jean Holloway; Teleplay by : Stanford Whitmore	January 8, 1965
Due to illness and injury, including his own bum knee, General Savage finds himself short of qualified pilots to lead bombing missions. Help arrives in the person of Major Peter Gray, a highly experienced man with just the right credentials, but also some lingering pains from his own earlier mishap. Complications arise when Savage discovers that Gray's wife, Ann, is his former fiancée and that he still has strong feelings for her. Stressed by the awkward situation, he assigns Gray to command a mission that is supposed to be a milk run, only to discover too late that the Luftwaffe is laying in wait. The mission turns into a slaughter, with eight planes lost, and though he survives to return, Gray is convinced Savage is trying to get him killed so he can have another chance with Ann. Guest Stars: Steve Forrest as Maj. Grey, Barbara Shelly as Ann Grey, and Hazel Court as Liz Woodruff.
17	17	"The Albatross"	William Graham	Richard Landau	January 15, 1965
Lt. Joseph Kane, a handsome man with an upcoming movie career accepts one extra mission as a favor to Savage, but receives a bad facial burn, and recklessly sinks into depression over the loss of his good looks. Guest Stars: Robert Drivas as Lt. Joseph Kane, and Janine Grey as Angie.
18	18	"The Lorelei"	Don Medford	Albert Aley	January 22, 1965
The Lorelei is a bomber that returns from a mission and lands intact, but with its entire crew dead. Gen. Savage assigns the plane to his new 2nd-in-command, Col. Royce, who he's supposed to evaluate for assignment as a group commander. Royce is a highly-experienced, decorated, and well-liked pilot with one apparent flaw; he's decidedly superstitious, and he's just been handed command of a Flying Dutchman that seems to have a mind of its own. Guest Stars: Rip Torn as Col. Royce, Diana van der Vlis as Carol Royce, and Bruce Dern as Lt. Danton.
19	19	"Faith, Hope and Sergeant Aronson"	László Benedek	Charles Larson	January 29, 1965
Savage returns from a mission gravely wounded, requiring a delicate operation to remove shrapnel endangering his heart; an operation Dr. Kaiser doesn't feel confident to perform. While waiting for a specialist, Savage is placed in a ward next to Sgt. Aronson who has just lost his lifetime friend to battle wounds and is also quickly losing his faith in God. Savage tries to talk him out of his closing shell, but the Sergeant slips deeper into melancholy, that is until he meets someone who could use a little of his disappearing faith. Guest Stars: Sorrell Brooke as Sgt. Aronson, Phyliss Love as Nurse Jenkins, and Antoinette Bower as Ivy Wescott. Note: John Larkin died of a heart attack the day this episode aired, but he'd filmed his scenes for the following six episodes prior to his death.
20	20	"To Heinie, With Love"	Ralph Senensky	Story by : Ken Pettus; Teleplay by : Jack Turley & Charles Larson	February 5, 1965
Savage keeps a skillful navigator who had a father that was a Nazi in the German American Bund, and becomes more doubtful of him when an error kills a crewman. Guest Stars: Kier Dullea as Lt. Kurt Muller, and Jill Haworth as Nora Burgess.
21	21	"The Clash"	Josef Leytes	Story by : Mike Adams; Teleplay by : Jack Turley & Mike Adams	February 12, 1965
Savage and a Nazi colonel are the only survivors in a raft after shooting down each other's planes at sea, but the Nazi tries to force him to surrender at gunpoint. Guest Stars: Albert Paulsen as Col. Dieter.
22	22	"The Ticket"	Josef Leytes	Al C. Ward	February 26, 1965
A uncaring Lt. named Paul Stiger wins the lottery after accepting a very dangerous mission, and realizes things in his life are worth living for, but he is not allowed to back out of the assignment. Guest Stars: Earl Holliman as Lt. Paul Stiger, Elen Willard as Myra Bentley, and Donald Herron as Lt. Crain.
23	23	"The Trap"	Ralph Senensky	Richard L. Newhafer	March 5, 1965
A pilot's worst nightmare - buried underground with no guarantee of ever seeing the open sky again. Savage and a group of Londoners are trapped in a cellar during an air raid, while the only man who knows they are there is wounded and incoherent. Savage has to deal with an elderly widow facing true fear for the first time, a young coal miner with a phobia about being buried alive, a charlatan confronted by the lies behind his life, and a girl about to become an unwed mother. Oh, and there is one other occupant of this hell under earth - an unexploded, ticking time bomb. Guest Stars: Hermione Baddeley as Lady Constance Belden, and John Leyton as Bert Higgs.
24	24	"End of the Line"	Sutton Roley	Dean Riesner	March 12, 1965
Maj. Gallagher feeling guilty over the death of a friend who replaced him, tries to help the man's fiancée, but she is a greedy, manipulative and deceitful person, and only Savage can save him from making a huge mistake. Guest Stars: Paul Burke as Maj. Joe Gallagher, Sarah Marshall as May Hudson, and Barbara Feldon as Lt. Clare Cummings.
25	25	"The Threat"	Ralph Senensky	Jack Turley	March 19, 1965
Savage becomes the target of Nazi assassination attempts by a spy on the base, while propaganda broadcasts continue to taunt him. Guest Star: Lawrence Naismith as Gilly Bright. Note: Final appearance of Gen. Wiley Crowe.
26	26	"Mutiny at Ten Thousand Feet"	Sutton Roley	Harold Jack Bloom	March 26, 1965
A Lt. Tony Kemp conspires to make Savage appear to be mentally unstable, so he can take over his plane and land in Switzerland where the crew can sit out the rest of the war. He even blackmails Sgt. Reese, his crew's radioman to go along, as Reese - whose real name is Chapman - is wanted for killing a kid back in the states to help him, even though Reese knows what could happen for munity. Guest Stars: Larry Blyden as Lt. Tony Kemp, Robert Brown as Sgt. Reese, John Kerr as Lt. Ray Thatcher, Stuart Margolin as Lt. Murray Epstein, and Hazel Court as Liz.
27	27	"The Mission"	William Graham	Samuel Roeca	April 2, 1965
While preparing for a top priority mission, Gen. Savage replaces a sick crewman with a hotshot gunner, only to discover too late that the man has a bad reputation as well as a negative attitude. Joe Waller is a washed-out pilot trainee who takes out his resentment on his fellow crew members. The resulting friction threatens the integrity of the crew, even before Waller is forced to replace the fatally wounded bombardier, making him the most important man in the entire mission. Guest Stars: Burt Brinkerhoff as F/O Joe Waller, Chris Robinson as Lt. Gunther, Bruce Dern as Lt. Michaels. Note: Chris Robinson played a different character here before returning as T/Sgt. Komansky on the following season.
28	28	"The Cry of Fallen Birds"	Walter Grauman	Story by : Edward J. Lasko; Teleplay by : Edward J. Lasko & Charles Larson	April 9, 1965
Savage is badly injured when his plane crashes near an ancestral mansion in the flight path of the base, and later fights with its beautiful female owner to have it legally demolished. Guest Stars: Dana Wynter as Lady Cathrine, Lloyd Bochner as Capt. Evans
29	29	"V for Vendetta"	William Graham	Al C. Ward	April 16, 1965
Savage has been taking great loses by unsuccessfully trying to bomb factories making planes that wreak havoc on the 918th, and now he risks losing his command. Meanwhile, Maj. Gus Denver, having finally gotten over the mess he made, is given his old job back, and must help prove that Savage is good enough to remain in command of the 918th. Guest Stars: Gary Lockwood as Maj. Gus Denver, and Lin McCarthy as Gen. Hoagland.
30	30	"P.O.W."	Don Medford	Al C. Ward	April 23, 1965
31	31	"P.O.W."	Don Medford	Al C. Ward	April 30, 1965
Savage becomes a POW with three other men, in a Nazi camp after being shot down, and the commander there, Col. Ritcher, wants to use him to break the other prisoner's will to escape. With the help of Group Captain Brail, he begins to mastermind an escape for him, his crew and two others, involving kidnapping the Col. Ritcher, and escaping towards the coast. Guest Stars: Alf Kjellin as Col. Ritcher, as Donald Herron as Group Captain Brail, John van Dreelan as Capt. Staufman, James Farentino as Moxie and Peter Haskell as Doc.
32	32	"The Hero"	Ralph Senensky	Albert Aley	May 7, 1965
A WW1 ace-pilot colonel named Pappy Hartley and former instructor of Savage joins the 918th, but he may be too independent which costs lives. Guest Star: James Whitmore as Col. Pappy Hartley.

=== Season 2 (1965–66) ===
All episodes in black-and-white

No. overall	No. in season	Title	Directed by	Written by	Original release date
33	1	"The Loneliest Place in the World"	Richard Donner	Harold Jack Bloom	September 13, 1965
Gen. Savage is killed when his plane is shot down by a captured B-17, killing all but Flight Engineer T/Sgt. Sandy Komansky, who returns to base and gets a chilling welcome. Later, Lt. Col Gallagher, acting head of the 918th, shoots down another suspicious B-17 killing 10 Americans, leaving him with guilt, and when flying another mission with Komansky, shoots down the captured B-17. At the end of the episode, Gen. Britt promotes Gallagher to full Col., putting him in premiant charge of the 918th, and then Gallagher makes Komansky his premiant flight engineer. Guest Stars: Robert Colbert as Lt. Col. Frank Bailey, and Claudine Longet as Suzanne Arnais.
34	2	"R/X For a Sick Bird"	Richard Donner	William C. Anderson & William D. Hamilton & Marc Huntley	September 20, 1965
Gallagher must protect a lovely resistance leader named Iika Zranda, as spies on the airbase sabotage his planes and equipment, trying to kill her also. She and Komansky later escape a sabotaged plane and make it back, then before long, a man is murdered by the spies, leading Gallagher to tell both Komansky and Stovell the truth, in order to find the spies and deal with them. Guest Stars: Gia Scala as Iika Zranda, and J.D. Cannon as Gen. David Creighton.
35	3	"Then Came the Mighty Hunter"	László Benedek	Jack Paritz	September 27, 1965
A very young corporal named Steve Corbett with a great gunnery training record is anxious to prove himself, but freezes up during actual combat. After shooting down a German plane, and seeing men die around him, he cracks up and admits he's only 15 years old, and runs away from the base after being teased. Komansky leaves to the base and brings Corbett back, but the next morning, he stows away on a plane to prove himself, despite the risk he puts the crew in. Guest Star: Beau Bridges as Cpl. Steve Corbett.
36	4	"The Idolator"	László Benedek	Story by : Gustave Field; Teleplay by : Gerald Sanford & Marc Huntly	October 4, 1965
A Lt. friend of Gallagher's named Josh McGraw, who grew up feeling overshadowed by him, does everything from air stunts to disobeying orders to outshine him, to prove he's the better man. Guest Star: Gary Lockwood as Lt. Josh McGraw.
37	5	"Big Brother"	Jerry Hopper	Jack Turley	October 11, 1965
Gallagher's older battle fatigued brother, Lt. Col. Preston Gallagher, in charge of a base in North Africa refuses to refuel his planes, and has plans to abandon the area. Guest Stars: Jack Lord as Lt. Col. Preston Gallagher, Julie Adams as Lt. Betty Russo, and Robert Colbert as Lt. Col. Frank Bailey.
38	6	"The Hotshot"	Richard Donner	Robert Lewin	October 18, 1965
A Lt. Col. named Troper, is put in charge of a P-51 fighter group, and comes to harbor great anger toward Gallagher when his B-17 mistakenly shoots down one of his planes in battle. Things only get worse when the Lt. Col. has his men focus on shooting down German planes instead of protecting the B-17's, resulting in a feud between them. Guest Stars: Warren Oates as Lt. Col. Troper, Jill Haworth as Fay Vendry, and William Bryant as Maj. Marriott.
39	7	"Show Me a Hero, I'll Show You a Bum"	Richard Donner	Robert Hamner	October 25, 1965
Komansky saves a wounded Gallagher and his crew by landing his plane, earning himself a medal, and a supposed field commission, but a British reporter named Susan Nesbit wants to exploit that to further her own career. Guest Stars: Lois Nettleton as Susan Nesbit, Lloyd Bochner as Kirby Wyatt, and Burt Reynolds as T/Sgt. Chapman.
40	8	"Runway in the Dark"	Robert Douglas	Robert Lewin	November 1, 1965
Gallagher picks up a Norwegian resistance leader named Arn Borg who has vital target information, but he insist on taking his little boy alone which gets some of his men killed in the process. Gallagher soon starts to suspect a double-cross, he puts the Borg under arrest, until Borg can prove he's legitimate and had good reason for bringing his son with him. Guest Stars: Albert Paulson as Arn Borg, Jill Haworth as Lt. Fay Vendry, and Jack Weston as Capt. "Chub" Willis.
41	9	"I Am the Enemy"	Robert Gist	Anthony Spinner	November 8, 1965
A pilot, a Major with a 918th named Kurt Brown, has a murderous hatred for all Germans, and having flown 42 missions, way more than required, and refusing any rest or leave. Gallagher soon finds out his hatred is due to him being born in Germany, and must a way to channel him or stop him. Guest Stars: William Shatner as Maj. Kurt Brown, and Elen Willard as Elizabeth Hoffman.
42	10	"Grant Me No Favor"	Robert Douglas	Anthony Spinner	November 15, 1965
Gallagher's father, Lt. Gen. Max Gallagher, pushing a promotion for his son Joe, finds he is only interested in defending a Lt. Col. Bill Christy who aborted the target, under extreme fire, that no one has been able to reach before. Guest Stars: Barry Sullivan as Lt. Gen. Max Gallagher, and Frank Aletter as Lt. Col. Bill Christy.
43	11	"Storm at Twilight"	Robert Gist	Story by : James Doherty; Teleplay by : Anthony Spinner	November 22, 1965
Stovall uses tricks and favors to get back on flying status after finding out his son becomes missing in action, against the protests of Gallagher that he is too old to fly, and that their next mission as right near a POW camp.
44	12	"We're Not Coming Back"	Jerry Hopper	Philip Saltzman & Dan Ullman	November 29, 1965
Gallagher and his crew are forced to land in occupied Yugoslavia, where he must make a deal with a rebel leader to get help to repair his plane. Guest Stars: Ina Balin as Mara Yellich, George Voskovec as Nicholas Yellich, and Gunner Hellstrom as Col. Falkenstein.
45	13	"The Jones Boys"	Robert Douglas	William D. Gordon	December 6, 1965
A Lt. named Jaydee Jones, terrified of combat, crashes at take-off killing his co-pilot, and thieving T/Sgt. Chapman agrees to cover it up, but later demands he desert with him to a neutral country. Meanwhile, Jaydee's older brother, T/Sgt. Frank Jones, a ground chief on the base, who's looked after Jaydee his whole life, becomes concerned and worried after spying on Jaydee and Chapman, suspecting something off. After boarding a plane, Jaydee begins to have second thoughts about leaving, forcing Chapman to hold him at gunpoint to fly a B-17 away from the base, with Frank still onboard and knocked out. Gallagher is forced to chase after them in a P-51, to force the plane back. Guest Stars: Andrew Prine as Lt. Jaydee Jones, Burt Reynolds as T/Sgt. Chapman, Bruce Dern as T/Sgt. Frank Jones, and Mark Richman as Col. Kendal Hunter.
46	14	"Between the Lines"	Gerald Mayer	Story by : Coles Trapnell; Teleplay by : Andy Lewis	December 13, 1965
Gallagher's B-17 is forced down between German and Russian lines with a badly wounded general, his cowardly aid, and a secret document he must get to London. Guest Stars: Donald Herron as M/Sgt. Trask, Larry Gates as Maj. Gen. Stance, and Phil Bruns as Lt. Gargas.
47	15	"Target 802"	Robert Douglas	Story by : Sherman Yellen; Teleplay by : Sherman Yellen & Marc Huntly	December 27, 1965
Gallagher's damaged plane prematurely releases it bombs over a French town, killing the allied leader of the resistance there, who was hiding several airman. Most are soon arrested by the Germans, but the leader's daughter takes the remaining two and her son to England, and now plans to kill Gallagher in revenge. Guest Stars: Lisa Pera as Claudine Corbelle, Lou Antonio as Capt. Bane Pollard, Harry Townes as Brig. Gen. Marteen.
48	16	"Falling Star"	László Benedek	Andy Lewis	January 3, 1966
On the way back from a mission, a mentor of Gallagher's, Col. Gus "Pappy" Wexler is flying as an observer. Gallagher asks Fowler to let Wexler fly in the co-pilot seat. They are attacked by ME-109's and Joe is wounded, Pappy takes over calling Gallagher "Bernie". At HQ General Pritchard asks Harvey Stovall's opinion of Wexler. General Britt is away in Washington and if he is not back, Pritchard will be looking for a new Wing Commander. He is thinking of Wexler or Gallagher. Gallagher is on the sick list so Wexler becomes acting Group Commander, and Gallagher the acting Wing Commander. Wexler wants things run by the book. On the next mission, he takes 3 planes and turns too early and aborts. He calls his Bob Fowler, his co-pilot "Bernie", and when Sandy questions him, Wexler orders him to stand down and report to the Flight Surgeon when he is back. Later in the Star & Bottle, the pilots celebrate with Wexler and he makes a good show of it. He arm wrestles Capt. Banazek and wins. Guest Stars: James Daly as Col. "Pappy" Wexler, Barbara Shelley as Mrs. Clyde-Bryce, and David Macklin as Lt. Booth.
49	17	"The Slaughter Pen"	Robert Douglas	Dave and Andy Lewis	January 10, 1966
With Allied bombing operations stymied by mysteriously improved German radar capabilities, Gallagher becomes involved with a multi-national, multi-service commando mission aimed at knocking out the enemy facilities and stealing the technology for study. The undertaking is put at grave risk, however, by a combination of poor coordination between the different units involved, Nazi spies, and the reluctant participation of a key expert, Capt., Deel, who happens to be a problematic acquaintance of Gallagher's from his past. And now Deel is having a fling with the sister of an important British officer involved in the task who is not at all happy about it. Guest Stars: Harry Guardino as Capt. Barney Deel, Juliet Mills as Sydney Vivyan, John van Dreelan as Gen. Reger, and Michael Rennie as Gen. St. John Keighley.
50	18	"Underground"	Robert Douglas	Story by : James Doherty & Coles Trapnell; Teleplay by : Robert Lewin	January 17, 1966
Gallagher bails out in Switzerland where the underground tries to help him, a woman, and a German soldier claiming to be a deserter, escape. Guest Stars: Robert Walker as Karl Weigand, Claudine Longet as Liane, and Whit Bissell as George Richardson.
51	19	"Which Way the Wind Blows"	László Benedek	James M. Miller	January 24, 1966
Helping the 918th to use weather patterns to bomb, an attractive meteorologist captain becomes rebellious when her weather plane is shot down. Guest Star: Dina Merrill as Capt. Patricia Bates.
52	20	"The Outsider"	Don Medford	Ellis Marcus	January 31, 1966
Lt. Wilson, a young, inexperienced fighter pilot, is so eager to get his first kill and fit in with his flying mates that he manages to shoot up Gallagher's plane while chasing an enemy fighter. Gallagher is willing to chalk it up to youthful exuberance and let the matter drop, but Sandy takes it personally and makes Wilson's life miserable. To make up for it, Wilson volunteers for a dangerous mission and ends up saving Gallagher's life at great peril to his own. This makes him an instant hero, especially in Sandy's eyes. It also leaves him craving even more attention, but at what risk. Guest Stars: James MacArthur as Lt. Harley Wilson, James Callahan as Maj. Temple, Sammy Jackson as Lt. Mikler, and Patrick Wayne as Lt. Gabriel.
53	21	"Back to the Drawing Board"	Gerald Mayer	Dave and Andy Lewis	February 7, 1966
The 918th planes are equipped with a new radar that makes it very easy to bomb enemy targets through thick clouds, but the Germans soon learn it makes their enemies' planes that much easier to track, as well. Guest Stars: Burgess Meredith as Dr. Rink, Alf Kjellin as Col. Ehrland, and Robert Doyle as M/Sgt Zemler.
54	22	"Twenty-Fifth Mission"	Lawrence Dobkin	Carey Wilber	February 14, 1966
Maj. Tom Parsons has apparently just completed his 25th mission, making him eligible to be rotated back to the States, out of the fighting, something he celebrates with great relish. However, Gallagher has formulated a plan to knock out an exceptionally difficult target, and it requires a pilot with qualifications that match Parson's to a tee. The Major is definitely not inclined to volunteer with a guaranteed return to safety in hand, especially since the assignment has the earmarks of a suicide mission. No amount of persuasion budges him, that is until Gen. Britt discovers a technicality that leaves him at 24 completed missions, instead of 25. Guest Stars: Bradford Dillman as Maj. Tom Parsons, Don Galloway as Capt. Bruce Cowley, and Antoinette Bower as Naomi Rockford.
55	23	"The Survivor"	Alan Crosland, Jr.	Philip Saltzman	February 21, 1966
A strict, unfriendly pilot Capt. named Bradovich joins the 918th and creates hatred for him by the men, which worsens when he appears to be the only survivor after his plane is shot down. Guest Stars: Don Gordon as Capt. Bradovich, Jill Ireland as Sara Blodgett, and Don Quine as Lt. Tourneau.
56	24	"Angel Babe"	Robert Douglas	Preston Wood	February 28, 1966
After 49 successful missions, Angel Babe is the Grande Damme of the 918th bomber fleet, and to some like her flight engineer, Sgt. Willets, she even seems to have a soul (and mind) of her own. Her endurance has earned her the label of good-luck charm to the men of the Group. Upon completion of her 50th mission, the Army has decided to retire her from active service and return her to the States for a life of leisure as a recruiting icon. But Angel Babe seems to have other ideas, as she suddenly develops a multitude of mechanical ailments that thwart that final-mission goal. Not only does this strange turn of events recast her as an albatross, it also casts a shadow of suspicion over Willets due to his insistence that she's not ready to withdraw from combat. Guest Stars: Roddy McDowall as T/Sgt. Willets, Frank Aletter as Sgt. Prinzi, and Lee Patterson as Maj. Budd.
57	25	"Decoy"	Gerald Mayer	Lou Shaw	March 7, 1966
Gallagher is very suspicious when he and Capt. Powell are set free on an island they were marooned on after being captured by a Nazi U-boat commander. Guest Stars: Michael Callan as Capt. Powell, and Carl Schell as Capt. Wessel.
58	26	"The Hollow Man"	Robert Douglas	Gustave Field & Marc Huntly	March 14, 1966
A Capt. called Wally Bolen, who was tortured for months by the Nazis, gets back on flying status, but suffers from flashbacks that endangers all the men working with him. Guest Stars: Robert Drivas as Capt. Wally Bolen, Paul Carr as Capt. Johnny Lewis, and Marion Thompson as Ruth Wagner.
59	27	"Cross Hairs on Death"	Alan Crosland, Jr.	Robert Lewin	March 21, 1966
Everett Stone, a pilot who washed out of flight training and was subsequently dishonorably discharged from the service for insubordination after serving six months hard labor, finds his way to England as a civilian named Thomas Carpenter, and proceeds to infiltrate the 918th and masquerade as a captain, claiming his belongings and credentials were stolen in London. Desperate for replacements, Gallagher puts him to work as co-pilot on several missions to test his mettle while waiting for confirmation of Carpenter's status that will never come. However, he is recognized by Sgt. Stan Holcombe, who confronts the impostor but briefly holds his tongue. Holcombe is then seriously injured on a mission before he can reveal the truth and dies after surgery. Carpenter is eager to command his own bomber before his ruse is discovered, but his evaluator, Capt. Enright, declines to recommend him, alerted to something amiss, even if he cannot quite put his finger on it. As Stone/Carpenter's web of lies begins to become undone, he gets ever more desperate and willing to do whatever it takes to accomplish his mysterious goal. Guest Stars: James Franciscus as Capt. Thomas Carpenter/Everett Stone, and Roger Perry as Capt. Vic Enright.
60	28	"Day of Reckoning"	Alan Crosland, Jr.	Halsted Welles	March 28, 1966
An American chaplain called Archer loses faith when the woman he loves, and more than two dozen young soldiers, are killed when 918th base is bombed; three of the Germans responsible are captured but plot to complete their original sabotage mission. Guest Stars: Charles Aidman as Captain Archer, John van Dreelan as Maj. Schindler, and Hans Gudegast as Maj. Bentz.
61	29	"Siren Voices"	Robert Douglas	Story by : Ed Kelso; Teleplay by : Carey Wilber	April 4, 1966
A propaganda broadcaster for the Nazis is really a British agent sending coded messages through her over the air piano playing, to help the allies. Guest Stars: Edward Mulhare as Kurt Halland, Victoria Shaw as Pati Conboy, and Juliet Mills as Helen

=== Season 3 (1966–67) ===
All episodes in color

No. overall	No. in season	Title	Directed by	Written by	Original release date
62	1	"Gauntlet of Fire"	Joseph Pevney	John T. Dugan	September 9, 1966
Continuous stressful missions have made the men of 918th extremely fatigued, and put their planes in very bad shape. Happiness comes when Gen. Britt gives them a 10-day leave, only for Gen. Pritchard to revoke it for a combined all-out bomber offence, requiring all groups, despite the 918th being exhausted, and knowing they'll likely take heavy casualties. Guest Stars: William Windom as Lt. Col. Christy, Linden Chiles as Capt. Bluitt, and Tim McIntire as Lt. Wallach.
63	2	"Massacre"	Robert Douglas	Carey Wilber	September 16, 1966
A Russian Major named Baladin aboard a 918th bomber recklessly shoots down a friendly plane from his own country, which causes problems for Gallagher when his force lands at a Russian airbase. Guest Stars: Kevin McCarthy as Maj. Baladin, Kathleen Widows as Lt. Irina Zavanoff, and Michael Constantine as Gen. Vorodenko.
64	3	"Face of a Shadow"	Richard Benedict	Dave and Andy Lewis	September 23, 1966
Gallagher's men take charge of a newly liberated Italian airfield, but the colonel there is so lax, that loyalist could help the Germans retake the base. Guest Stars: Jack Lord as Col. Yates, Philip E. Pine as Maj. Shull, Alan Bergman as Maj. Holtzer, and Luciana Paluzzi as Carla.
65	4	"Fortress Wiesbaden"	Joseph Pevney	Story by : Michael Lalor Brown; Teleplay by : Carey Wilber	September 30, 1966
Gallagher agrees to take orders from a brutal British Major named Mallory leading his commandos to destroy an advanced radar facility, after his B-17 is shot down. Guest Stars: Christiane Schmidtmer as Frieda von Heurtzel, Lloyd Bochner as Maj. Mallory, and Bernard Fox as Sgt. Maj. Higgins.
66	5	"A Distant Cry"	Robert Douglas	Jack Curtis	October 7, 1966
A strict instructor captain gives low instrument rating grades to good combat pilot that could hurt his chances of promotion. Guest Stars: Roy Thinnes as Capt. P.J Pridie, Robert Blake as Lt. Johnny Eagle, and Wayne Rogers as Lt. Fredricks.
67	6	"Practice to Deceive"	Robert Douglas	William D. Gordon	October 14, 1966
Gallagher becomes a POW in Germany, when a German admiral - an old friend of his father's from before the war - helps to rescue him, then reveals plans to kill Hitler and negotiate total surrender to the allies. Guest Stars: Eduard Franz as Admiral von Kreuter, John van Dreelan as Col. von Datz, and Diana Hyland as Heidi Voss.
68	7	"The All-American"	Joseph Pevney	Jack Hawn	October 28, 1966
A pilot Lt. named Masters is being pressured by a long time mentor major to promote his great college sport image, when he's much more anxious to fly B-17s. Guest Stars: Mart Hulswit as Lt. Masters, Norman Fell as Maj. Praeger, Robert Doyle as Capt. King.
69	8	"The Pariah"	Josef Leytes	Robert C. Dennis	November 4, 1966
Gallagher has a German born navigator bomb a hidden factory, and when they're forced to land in a Nazi Camp his accent becomes a liability as the Russians advance. Guest Stars: Robert Walker as M/Sgt/ Hentz Reiniger/Herman Schutz, Albert Salmi as Maj. Brunner, and Kurt Kreuger as Col. Gerlach.
70	9	"The Fighter Pilot"	Robert Douglas	E.B. Anderson	November 11, 1966
Three top Pacific fighter pilots make it to the 918th without authorization, and are anxious to get back into air combat no matter what it takes. Also, three women arrive on a B-17, having been transferred to headquarters, but it turns out one of them has a special connection with one of the pilots. Guest Stars: Don Gordon as Lt. Dominic Dejohn, and Marlyn Mason as S/Sgt. Margo Demarest.
71	10	"To Seek and Destroy"	Donald McDougall	Glen A. Larson	November 18, 1966
A British fighter pilot named Anthony Carmichael is enlisted to recover parts of a German guided missile that crashed in Sweden intact. But he has become depressed, alcoholic, overbearing and, unfortunately, has an anti-Yank chip on his shoulder. Guest Stars: David Frankham as Group Capt. Anthony Carmichael, and Richard Anderson as Brig. Gen. Phil Doud.
72	11	"Burden of Guilt"	László Benedek	Robert Longsdorf, Jr	December 2, 1966
A Col. named Ray Hollenbeck tries to keep Gallagher grounded, to save his own reputation after failing many times to find and destroy U-boat bases. Guest Stars: James Broderick as Ray Hollenbeck, Richard Anderson as Brig. Gen. Phil Doud, and Wesley Addy as Maj. Gen. Fox.
73	12	"The Ace"	Robert Douglas	Oscar Millard	December 9, 1966
A top notch, but aging, bomber pilot is called in to surgically bomb a laboratory of German scientists working on atomic weapon plans adjacent to a building holding allied POWs. Guest Stars: James Whitmore as Col. Harry Connelly, Joe Maross as Brig. Gen. Chandler.
74	13	"Six Feet Under"	Murray Golden	James Doherty	December 16, 1966
Gallagher is on allied captured base in Belgium in danger of being overran, with a boy that refuses to help him translate a wealth of German documents. Guest Stars: Martin Milner as Maj. Tony Dimscek, Richard Anderson as Brig. Gen. Phil Doud, Rudy Solari as S/Sgt. Battalana.
75	14	"The Duel at Mont Sainte Marie"	Josef Leytes	R. Wright Campbell	December 23, 1966
Germans are using a hillside as an observation post near a monastery of nuns and children, hopeful the Americans won't bomb their position. Guest Stars: Lilia Skala as Sister Martha, Joseph Campanella as Father Roman, Richard Anderson as Brig. Gen. Phil Doud, and Edward Mulhare as Col. Schotten.
76	15	"Graveyard"	Robert Douglas	William D. Gordon	December 30, 1966
Two black U.S. soldiers guarding enemy POWs on an island help Gallagher and his wounded after they bail out, but the good medic in charge, may be hiding a secret. Guest Stars: Ossie Davis as Maj. Glenn Luke/Pvt. James R. Prince, Joe Maross as Brig. Gen. Chandler, and Jon Voight as Capt. Holtke.
77	16	"A Long Time Dead"	Gene Nelson	James Doherty	January 6, 1967
A pilot captain called Cal Dula is suspected of bailing out of a plane and leaving his crew to die in a previous mission, may have had a uncontrollable reason for doing so. He later becomes hated on the base for kicking Komansky out of a plane when Komansky is wounded on a mission, after he tried to court martial him following an earlier mission. Guest Stars: Peter Graves as Capt. Cal Dula, Anne Helm as WAAF Sgt. Jeanne Springer, and Tom Skerritt as T/Sgt. Nick Neely.
78	17	"The Hunters and the Killers"	Robert Douglas	E.B. Anderson	January 13, 1967
A bitter Commodore named Leon Crompton, given a sea command, who hates and blames Gallagher's father for a demotion, orders that the 918th fly without bombs and only spot German U-boats so that his ships can destroy them. Guest Stars: Ralph Bellamy as Commodore Leon Crompton, Michael Witney as Obie Sorenson, and Anna Capri as Cpl. Terri Cahill.

== Awards and honors ==
Year	Award	Result	Category	Recipient
1965	Golden Globe Award	Nominated	Best TV Show	-
1965	Emmy Award	Nominated	Outstanding Individual Achievements in Entertainment - Cinematographer	William W. Spencer
1967	American Cinema Editors	Won	Best Edited Television Program	Jodie Copelan (For episode "The All American")

== Comic books ==
Dell Comics produced a comic book based on the series that ran two issues in 1965. Both had photocovers and artwork by Joe Sinnott.
