= William W. Spencer =

American cinematographer

- Born: July 28, 1921; Windsor, Ontario, Canada
- Died: May 14, 2007 (aged 85); Brentwood, California, U.S.
- Occupation: Cinematographer
- Spouse: Daphne Ruth Spencer (m. 1947)
- Children: 3

William W. Spencer (July 28, 1921 – May 14, 2007) was an American cinematographer. He won two Primetime Emmy Awards and was nominated for another one in the category Outstanding Cinematography for his work on the television programs 12 O'Clock High, Barnaby Jones and Fame.

Spencer died on May 14, 2007, at his home in Brentwood, California, at the age of 85.
