= George T. Clemens =

American cinematographer

- Born: George Tansey Clemens; July 26, 1902; Joplin, Missouri, U.S.
- Died: October 29, 1992 (aged 90)
- Occupation: Cinematographer

George Tansey Clemens (July 26, 1902 – October 29, 1992) was an American cinematographer who worked on such television shows as The Twilight Zone and Twelve O'Clock High. He won an Primetime Emmy Award in 1961 for his work on the former. Clemens was also nominated for three more.
