= Jack Priestley =

American cinematographer

- Born: John S. Priestley; July 27, 1926; New York, U.S.
- Died: May 26, 1993 (aged 66); Los Angeles, California, U.S.
- Occupation: Cinematographer
- Spouse: Nancy Priestley
- Children: 5

John S. Priestley (July 27, 1926 – May 26, 1993) was an American cinematographer. He won two Primetime Emmy Awards in 1962 and 1963 in the category Outstanding Cinematography for his work on the television program Naked City, and was nominated in 1964 for East Side/West Side.

Priestley died on May 26, 1993 of heart failure at his home in Los Angeles, California, at the age of 66.
