= Stevan Larner =

American cinematographer and winemaker

- Born: Stevan deFreest Larner; February 6, 1930; New York City, New York
- Died: November 6, 2005 (aged 75); Solvang, California
- Occupations: Cinematographer winemaker
- Children: Monica Larner

Stevan Larner (February 6, 1930 – November 6, 2005) was an American cinematographer and winemaker known for such films as Badlands, The Buddy Holly Story, Caddyshack, and Steelyard Blues.

He also directed the documentary Africa Goes to the Fair for the US Information Agency in 1966 about the US National Exhibition in Addis Ababa, Ethiopia and did the photography for USIA film Crossroaders in Africa (1963).

Larner died of injuries sustained from an ATV accident on November 6, 2005, at the age of 75.
