= Ralph Woolsey =

American cinematographer (1914–2018)

- Born: January 1, 1914; Oregon, U.S.
- Died: March 23, 2018 (aged 104); Woodland Hills, California, U.S.
- Occupation: Cinematographer
- Children: 3

Ralph Woolsey (January 1, 1914 – March 23, 2018) was an American cinematographer. He won a Primetime Emmy Award in 1968 for his work on It Takes a Thief, after having been nominated twice for the television programs Maverick and 77 Sunset Strip.

Woolsey died on March 23, 2018 at the Motion Picture & Television Fund cottages in Woodland Hills, California, at the age of 104.
