= Haskell Boggs =

American cinematographer (1909–2003)

Haskell B. Boggs
- Born: Haskell Buster Boggs; April 17, 1909; Jones, Oklahoma, U.S.
- Died: May 30, 2003 (aged 94); Burbank, California, U.S.
- Education: University of Southern California
- Occupation: Cinematographer
- Spouse: Evelyn Sullivan
- Children: 1

Haskell Buster Boggs (April 17, 1909 – May 30, 2003) was an American cinematographer.

Boggs worked on many of Jerry Lewis' early solo films including The Delicate Delinquent (1957), Rock-A-Bye Baby, The Geisha Boy (both 1958), Don't Give Up the Ship (1959), The Bellboy and Cinderfella (both 1960). He was fired by Lewis over a disagreement during The Ladies Man (1961). He returned to cinematography replacing Milton Krasner on Red Line 7000 (1965) but made just one additional theatrical film, Young Fury (1965), before moving into television.

He was nominated for five Primetime Emmy Awards in the category Outstanding Cinematography for his work on the television program Bonanza and the television film Where Pigeons Go to Die.

Boggs died in May 2003 of heart disease in Burbank, California, at the age of 94. He was buried in Forest Lawn Memorial Park.

== Early career ==
A native of Jones, Oklahoma, Boggs worked as a newsreel cameraman in Oklahoma City for several years before moving to Los Angeles. He began his Hollywood career as an assistant cameraman at Paramount Pictures in 1934, was promoted to camera operator in 1942, and became a cinematographer in 1955. During this time he worked with filmmakers and performers including Cecil B. DeMille, Carole Lombard, Frank Capra, Bing Crosby and Loretta Young. He was known by the nickname "Buzzy".

== Television ==
Boggs made his mark in television on Bonanza, which the Television Academy describes as television's first color series on film. He was nominated for Emmy Awards for the series four times during the 1960s, though he never won. The Television Academy's records list his Bonanza nominations as shared with Walter Castle (1962) and with William F. Whitley (1965 and 1967). He was also director of photography for the entire runs of Little House on the Prairie and Highway to Heaven, and received a fifth nomination in 1990 for the television film Where Pigeons Go to Die.

In an oral-history interview recorded by the Television Academy Foundation, Boggs discussed adapting to the smaller television screen, the technical demands of shooting Bonanza, working with cast members including Lorne Greene, Dan Blocker and Michael Landon, and the series' use of color to help sell color television sets for RCA.
