= Harry L. Wolf =

American cinematographer

- Born: Harry Leon Wolf; June 20, 1908; San Francisco, California, U.S.
- Died: November 10, 1993 (aged 85); Los Angeles, California, U.S.
- Occupation: Cinematographer
- Children: 1

Harry Leon Wolf (June 20, 1908 – November 10, 1993) was an American cinematographer. He won two Primetime Emmy Awards in the category Outstanding Cinematography for his work on the television programs Columbo and Baretta, and was nominated for a third for Little House on the Prairie.

Wolf died on November 10, 1993 in Los Angeles, California, at the age of 85.
