= Ted Voigtlander =

American cinematographer

- Born: Theodore Voigtlander; August 3, 1913; Kellogg, Idaho, U.S.
- Died: December 7, 1988 (aged 75); Los Angeles, California, U.S.
- Education: University of Idaho
- Occupation: Cinematographer
- Spouse: Mary Voigtlander
- Children: 1

Theodore Voigtlander (August 3, 1913 – December 7, 1988) was an American cinematographer. He won four Primetime Emmy Awards and was nominated for thirteen more in the category Outstanding Cinematography for his work on the television programs Ben Casey, The Wild, Wild West, Bonanza, Little House on the Prairie, Highway to Heaven and also the television films It's Good to Be Alive, The Loneliest Runner, The Diary of Anne Frank and The Bad Seed.

Voigtlander died on December 7, 1988 of cancer in Los Angeles, California, at the age of 75.
