= The Princess and the Cabbie =

- Genre: Comedy; Drama; Romance
- Written by: Edward Pomerantz
- Directed by: Glenn Jordan
- Starring: Valerie Bertinelli; Robert Desiderio; Shelley Long
- Music by: Patrick Williams
- Country of origin: United States
- Original language: English

Production
- Executive producer: Freyda Rothstein
- Producer: Ilene Kahn Power
- Cinematography: Gayne Rescher
- Editor: Michael McCroskey
- Running time: 120 min (including commercials)
- Production companies: Freyda Rothstein Productions; Time-Life Television Productions

Original release
- Network: CBS
- Release: November 3, 1981

The Princess and the Cabbie is a 1981 television movie aired on CBS on 3 November 1981 about a young woman who struggles with dyslexia.

== Plot ==
The film stars Valerie Bertinelli as Joanna James, an heiress who is sheltered from the real world. One day she meets literary cab driver, Joe Holiday (Robert Desiderio), who references Shakespeare, T. S. Eliot, James Joyce, William Carlos Williams, Albert Einstein, Gustave Flaubert and Agatha Christie. Also starring is Shelley Long. After leaving her book in his cab, Holiday gets to know her and discovers Joanna's secret: she can't read, write, or even remember telephone numbers or directions home. Determining that she is dyslexic, Holiday begins to help her gain independence.

== Awards ==
- 1982: Emmy Award: Outstanding Achievement in Music Composition for a Limited Series or a Special (Dramatic Underscore)

Nominated:

- 1982: Emmy Award: Outstanding Cinematography for a Limited Series or a Special

== See also ==
- List of artistic depictions of dyslexia
