= Sol Negrin =

American cinematographer

- Born: February 16, 1929; New York, U.S.
- Died: March 20, 2017 (aged 88)
- Occupation: Cinematographer
- Spouse: Betty Paradisin
- Children: 2

Sol Negrin (February 16, 1929 – March 20, 2017) was an American cinematographer. He was nominated for five Primetime Emmy Awards in the category Outstanding Cinematography for his work on the television programs Kojak and Baker's Dozen and the television film The Last Tenant. Other television programs he worked on included McCloud, St. Elsewhere and Rhoda, and his credits for feature films included The Concert for Bangladesh. He worked as camera operator or additional director of photography for feature films included Across 110th Street, King Kong, Jaws 2, Superman, I, the Jury and Robocop.

In 2009 he received the President's Award of the American Society of Cinematographers. He died in March 2017, at the age of 88.
