= The Man Who Came to Dinner (disambiguation) =

The Man Who Came to Dinner is a 1939 play written by George S. Kaufman and Moss Hart.

The Man Who Came to Dinner may also refer to:

- The Man Who Came to Dinner (1942 film), starring Monty Woolley
- The Man Who Came to Dinner (1972 film), a Hallmark Hall of Fame TV movie
