= Rearview =

Rearview or Rear view may refer to:

- "Rearview" (Anastacia song) by Anastacia
- "Rearview" (Beach Bunny song) by Beach Bunny
- "Rearview", a 2026 song by Kyle McKearney
- "Rear View" (song) by YoungBoy Never Broke Again and Mariah the Scientist
- "Rear View" (Zayn song), by Zayn
- "Rear View" (Highway Thru Hell), a 2015 television episode
- Rear view (wrestling), professional wrestling strike

== See also ==
- Rearview mirror (disambiguation)
