= Jennie: Lady Randolph Churchill =

- Written by: Julian Mitchell
- Directed by: James Cellan Jones
- Starring: Lee Remick; Ronald Pickup
- Country of origin: United Kingdom
- No. of series: 1
- No. of episodes: 7

Production
- Executive producer: Stella Richman
- Producer: Andrew Brown
- Production company: Thames Television

Original release
- Release: 5 November – 17 December 1974

Jennie: Lady Randolph Churchill is a British television period serial made by Thames Television and broadcast in 1974. It stars Lee Remick in the title role of Jennie Jerome, who became Lady Randolph Churchill. The series covers the time period from 1873 to 1921. In the United States, the series was aired as part of PBS' Great Performances.

The series was nominated for six Primetime Emmy Awards at the 28th Primetime Emmy Awards, including the Primetime Emmy Award for Outstanding Limited Series, and four BAFTA TV Awards. Remick was nominated for an Emmy for her portrayal of Jennie Jerome and won both Golden Globe and BAFTA awards.

== Cast ==
- Lee Remick as Jennie Jerome
- Ronald Pickup as Lord Randolph Churchill
- Warren Clarke as Winston Churchill
- Cyril Luckham as the Duke of Marlborough
- Jeremy Brett as Count Karel Kinsky
- Christopher Cazenove as George Cornwallis-West
- Joanna David as Princess Alexandra
- Thorley Walters as Edward, Prince of Wales
- Siân Phillips as Mrs. Patrick Campbell
- Zoë Wanamaker as John Oliver Hobbes
- Anna Fox as Clementine Churchill
- Rachel Kempson as the Duchess of Marlborough
- Barbara Parkins as Leonie Jerome
- Dan O'Herlihy as Leonard Jerome
- Malcolm Stoddard as Jack Churchill
- Charles Kay as Montagu Phippen Porch
- Patrick Troughton as Benjamin Disraeli

== Episodes ==
No.	Title	Original release date
1	"Jennie Jerome"	5 November 1974
Jennie Jerome, an American heiress, meets British aristocrat Lord Randolph Churchill.
2	"Lady Randolph"	12 November 1974
A feud between Randolph and the Prince of Wales results in the assignment to Ireland for Randolph and the family.
3	"Recovery"	19 November 1974
Randolph's career is on the rise. Jennie becomes involved with Count Kinsky.
4	"Triumph and Tragedy"	26 November 1974
Randolph's erratic behavior is a reflection of his illness. Jennie and Kinsky love each other with passion but Randolph needs Jennie in his final moments. She goes away with Randolph knowing that Kinsky will finish their relationship.
5	"A Perfect Darling"	3 December 1974
Five years after the death of Randolph, Jennie meets George Cornwallis-West, who is the same age as her son Winston. She charters the hospital ship RFA Maine to care for those wounded in the Second Boer War and creates The Anglo-Saxon Review. She marries George.
6	"His Borrowed Plumes"	10 December 1974
Jennie solves her money problems by writing her memoirs and plays. She divorces an unfaithful George and becomes involved in her sons' lives.
7	"A Past and a Future"	17 December 1974
Jennie feels lonely and worthless until she meets another much younger man, Montagu Phippen Porch. They marry and are very happy. Three years later, she has an accident and dies.
