= A Severed Head =

1961 novel by Iris Murdoch

- Cover
- Author: Iris Murdoch
- Cover artist: Val Biro
- Language: English
- Publisher: Chatto and Windus
- Publication date: 1961
- Publication place: United Kingdom
- Media type: Print (Hardcover and Paperback)
- Pages: 251

A Severed Head is a satirical, sometimes farcical 1961 novel by Iris Murdoch. It was Murdoch's fifth published novel.

Primary themes include marriage, adultery, and incest within a group of civilised and educated people. Set in and around London, it depicts a power struggle between grown-up middle-class people who are lucky to be free of real problems. A Severed Head was a harbinger of the sexual revolution that was to hit Britain in the 1960s and 1970s.

== Plot ==
Martin Lynch-Gibbon is a well-to-do 41-year-old wine merchant whose childless marriage to an older woman called Antonia has been one of convenience rather than love. It never occurs to him that his ongoing secret affair with Georgie, a young academic in her twenties, could be immoral. Martin is shocked when his wife tells him that she has been having an affair with Palmer Anderson, her psychoanalyst and a friend of the couple. Antonia informs Martin that she wants to divorce him and marry Anderson.

Martin moves out of their London house in Hereford Square. Before officially moving, Martin visits his brother Alexander's home near Oxford. While there he learns that Antonia has already written to Alexander about the divorce, leaving Alexander quite shaken. Later Martin returns to Hereford Square, where Antonia, now acting as a mother figure for him, tries to set up his new accommodation. After arguing with Antonia, he goes to the station to pick up Palmer's half-sister Honor Klein, a lecturer in anthropology who is visiting from Cambridge.

Martin still does not want to publicly acknowledge his affair with Georgie, let alone become engaged to her. A few days later, Martin finally visits Georgie. While Georgie wants to publicize their affair, Martin refuses because he believes it will "hurt" Antonia. However, they decide to go to Hereford Square so that Georgie can see the house. While Martin is showing her around, they hear someone arrive at the house. Assuming it is Antonia, Martin rushes Georgie out the back door, despite her protests that she wishes to meet Antonia. The unexpected visitor turns out to be Honor, who notices Georgie's handbag that was left behind in her rush out the door. After the event, Martin tries to contact Georgie but is unsuccessful and soon returns to the house. There he finds out that Palmer and Antonia know about his relationship with Georgie. Martin finds Georgie and learns that Honor Klein has exposed their secret. Soon after Georgie meets Antonia in an awkward situation.

Later, after a breakfast with Antonia, where they decide that Martin should take a short vacation, Martin calls on Georgie, only to discover his brother Alexander there. Martin is made even more furious when he discovers that Honor Klein was the person who introduced them to each other. After drunkenly returning to Hereford Square, Martin gets into a fight with Honor. After writing apology letters and waiting two days, Martin tries to find Antonia and Honor, only to find out that Antonia has gone and Honor is back in Cambridge.

Around this time, Martin also realizes that he is now madly in love with Honor. He follows her to Cambridge and, in the middle of the night, breaks into her house, only to find her in bed with her half-brother Palmer. Even though Martin doesn't tell Antonia of this incestuous encounter, Palmer believes he has, and begins to act strangely around Antonia. Antonia decides that she should be with Martin instead, causing Martin to cut off his affair with Georgie. A few days later, Alexander comes by to inform Martin that he has become engaged to Georgie, rekindling Martin's feelings for her and making him very upset.

After an angry confrontation with Palmer, who announces that he and Honor will be travelling abroad, Martin receives a package of hair from Georgie. Martin discovers an unconscious Georgie, who has attempted suicide, and is joined by Honor while waiting for the ambulance. After a scene in the hospital where everyone is gathered, Martin confesses his love to Honor. Honor says she knows but it does not matter because she is going away. Shortly afterwards, Antonia confesses to Martin that she has also been sleeping with his older brother Alexander ever since he introduced them, and that they will be getting married. In the end, Palmer and Georgie go away together, Alexander and Antonia are together, and Honor stays in England with Martin.

== Themes ==
In A Severed Head, Murdoch succeeds in presenting a middle-aged bourgeois who initially thinks of himself as a survivor but realises that he is in fact a victim. Throughout the novel, all the main characters insist that they have long overcome conventional morality, that they are free agents in the truest sense of the word, but in spite of his hedonism Lynch-Gibbon's residual moral posture just will not go away. Murdoch is particularly good at conveying the atmosphere of benevolence and the apparent lack of hard feelings among the individuals that have wronged and been wronged. ("It is not at all our idea that you should leave us. In a strange and rather wonderful way we can't do without you. We shall hold on to you, we shall look after you," Anderson says to Lynch-Gibbon, who sees himself as a cuckold rather than anything else.) At times funny, sad at others, A Severed Head also deals with more serious issues such as abortion (Georgie terminates her pregnancy at an early stage of her relationship with Lynch-Gibbon) and attempted suicide (again it is Georgie who tries to take her own life after being rejected by both Lynch-Gibbon and his brother).

Despite these serious overtones, A Severed Head is regarded by many readers as the most entertaining of Murdoch's novels. As British novelist William Sutcliffe put it, "Of all the lots-of-people-screwing-lots-of-other-people novels this is probably the best, and certainly the weirdest. With less philosophising and more shagging than Murdoch's other books, it is a joy to see this wonderful writer let her hair (and her knickers) down."

== Adaptations ==
With J. B. Priestley, Murdoch adapted her book for the stage. The play, directed by Val May, opened at the Theatre Royal, Bristol, in May 1963. In July 1963, it moved to the Criterion Theatre in London, for a run of 1,044 performances. In New York, after four previews, the Broadway production, also directed by May, opened on 28 October 1964 at the Royale Theatre, where it ran for only 29 performances. The cast included Sheila Burrell, reprising her role as Honor Klein, Robin Bailey again playing Martin Lynch-Gibbon, and Jessica Walter as Georgie. The Crest Theatre in Toronto, Canada produced the play in January 1965.

The novel was also made into a 1970 film starring Claire Bloom, Lee Remick, Richard Attenborough and Ian Holm. The screenplay was written by Frederic Raphael.

A five-part adaptation of A Severed Head by Stephen Wakelam appeared on the BBC Radio 4 series 15 Minute Drama in August 2015. The actors included Julian Rhind-Tutt as Martin Lynch-Gibbon, Helen Schlesinger as Honor Klein, and Victoria Hamilton as Antonia Lynch-Gibbon.
