= Charles Kay =

British actor (1930–2025)

- Born: Alfred Charles Piff; 31 August 1930; Coventry, Warwickshire, England
- Died: 8 January 2025 (aged 94); Wimbledon, London, England
- Occupation: Actor
- Years active: 1958–2013

Alfred Charles Piff (31 August 1930 – 8 January 2025), better known by his stage name Charles Kay, was an English actor.

== Early life and education ==
Kay was born in Coventry, Warwickshire, the son of Frances (née Petty) and Charles Beckingham Piff.

Originally educated at Warwick School, Kay went on to study medicine, then decided to train for the stage. He went to the Royal Academy of Dramatic Art (RADA) and in 1957, after graduation, joined the Radio Drama Company by winning the Carleton Hobbs Bursary. He went on to join the English Stage Company at the Royal Court Theatre. He created the roles of Jimmy in Arnold Wesker's Roots (1959) and Charles V in John Osborne's Luther (1961). He was also in Wesker's The Kitchen, The Changeling (1961), and Twelfth Night (1962).

== Theatre ==
Kay joined the Royal Shakespeare Company in 1963 and appeared in Stratford and at the Aldwych, London. He remained until 1966, during which time he portrayed a wide variety of roles, including Octavius Caesar in Julius Caesar, Clarence in The Wars of The Roses, Launcelot Gobbo in The Merchant of Venice, Antipholus of Ephesus in The Comedy of Errors, Osric in the David Warner Hamlet, Dobchinsky in The Government Inspector and Moloch in Robert Bolt's The Thwarting of Baron Bolligrew. He then joined the National Theatre where he played Celia in the all-male production of As You Like It (1967) and appeared in Peter Nichols's The National Health (1969).

== Film and television ==
In film, his highest profile role was as Count Orsini-Rosenberg in the Academy Award winning Amadeus. He also appeared in Kenneth Branagh's Henry V, and the 2002 version of The Importance of Being Earnest.

His numerous appearances on television include Crown Court, Jennie: Lady Randolph Churchill in which he played Montagu Phippen Porch, Fall of Eagles in which he played Tsar Nicholas II, I, Claudius, The Devil's Crown, To Serve Them All My Days, By the Sword Divided, Fortunes of War, Rumpole of the Bailey, The Citadel, Edge of Darkness, The Darling Buds of May, Jonathan Creek, Law and Disorder, Hetty Wainthropp Investigates, Holby City, Midsomer Murders and The Casebook of Sherlock Holmes story "The Creeping Man".

In 2002, he guest starred in the Doctor Who audio drama Excelis Rising.

Kay died on 8 January 2025, at the age of 94.

== Filmography ==
Year	Title	Role	Notes
1958	Bachelor of Hearts	Tom Clark	
1960	Piccadilly Third Stop	Toddy	
1962	The Wild and the Willing	Edgar Tibbs	
1966	The Deadly Affair	Lightborn	(in "Edward II"), Uncredited
1975	Hennessy	Westminster Guide	
1980	Nijinsky	Argentine Ambassador	
1980–1981	Lady Killers	Henry Curtis-Bennett	In four television episodes
1984	Amadeus	Count Orsini-Rosenberg	
1986	School for Vandals	Neil	
1989	Henry V	Archbishop of Canterbury	
1994	Willie's War	Captain Bassett	
1998	Goodnight Mister Tom	Mr. Greenway	
1999	Beautiful People	George Thornton	
2002	The Importance of Being Earnest	Gribsby	
