= The Vision (film) =

- Written by: William Nicholson
- Directed by: Norman Stone
- Starring: Dirk Bogarde; Helena Bonham Carter; Lee Remick; Lynda Bellingham; Philip O'Brien
- Theme music composer: Bill Connor
- Country of origin: United Kingdom
- Original language: English

Production
- Producer: David M. Thompson

Original release
- Network: BBC Two
- Release: 9 January 1988

The Vision is a British television film, which had its first showing on 9 January 1988 on BBC2. The film was written by William Nicholson and directed by Norman Stone. It starred Dirk Bogarde, Lee Remick, Lynda Bellingham and Helena Bonham Carter. It was episode 1 of the fourth series of Screen Two.

Filming locations included The Exchange, Mount Stuart Square, Cardiff, South Glamorgan, Wales, United Kingdom. The film was the main feature on the front cover of the Radio Times when it was first shown.

== Plot ==
A sinister cult uses a new television station to create a new European order. Dirk Bogarde plays a has-been UK TV personality hired to front the organisation but grows uneasy about its aims. At the end of the film, he attempts to warn the television audience about the dangers they face during the station's first transmission. But he fails to realise that recorded footage is being played during his "live" broadcast. He only realises when he is escorted from the studio by a stony-faced security guard and sees on the television monitors the (innocuous) beginning of his broadcast followed by a swift cut to his interviewer who thanks him for his contribution and then announces the showing of their first film, Back to the Future.

== Music ==
Bill Connor wrote the original music for the film.

The film features the soundtrack Watch the Skies by Ken Howard.

== Cast ==
The film starred Dirk Bogarde and Helena Bonham Carter.

- Eileen Atkins ... Helen Marriner
- Elizabeth Baker ... Party Hostess
- Lynda Bellingham ... Mary Morris
- James Frank Benson ... Pressman
- Bruce Boa ... Channel President
- Dirk Bogarde ... James Marriner
- Helena Bonham Carter ... Jo Marriner
- Richard Cubison ... Derek Miles
- Alan Curtis ... Lord Mallory
- Philip Goldacre ... Richard Jenkins
- Linda Jesticoe ... Drama Producer
- Martin Jones ... News Editor
- Michael Lees ... John Harvey
- David Lyon ... Richard Beck
- Paul Maxwell ... Bill Freed
- Lisabeth Miles ... Margaret Bunn
- Bruce Montague ... Geoffrey Gilman
- Philip O'Brien ... Charlie Parrott
- Stevie Parry ... Personnel Officer
- Tony Philips ... First Agent
- Lee Remick ... Grace Gardner
- Josh Richards ... Pressman
- Alan Rowlands ... Carson
- Frank Rozelaar-Green ... Second Agent
- Hugh Thomas ... Studio Director
