= Rearview mirror (disambiguation) =

A rearview mirror is a mirror in vehicles which allows the driver to see the area behind the vehicle.

Rear-view mirror and its variants may also refer to:

== Art, entertainment, and media ==
=== Albums ===
- Rearview Mirror: An American Musical Journey, 2005 album by Don McLean
- rearviewmirror (Greatest Hits 1991–2003), Pearl Jam's first greatest hits album

=== Songs ===
- "Rear View Mirror", a song by Alicia Keys from her 2001 album Songs in A Minor
- "Rear View Mirror", a song by E-40 featuring B-Legit and Stressmatic, from the 2011 album Revenue Retrievin': Overtime Shift
- "Rear View Mirror", a song by Grandaddy from their 2006 album Just Like the Fambly Cat
- "Rearviewmirror", a song by Pearl Jam from their 1993 album Vs.

=== Films ===
- Rearview Mirror (film), a 1984 American television film

=== Books ===
- Rearview Mirror: Looking Back at the FBI, the CIA and Other Tails , a 2001 book by William W. Turner

== See also ==
- Rear Window (disambiguation)
- "Rearview", a song by Anastacia from her 2005 album Anastacia
