= The Tempest (1960 film) =

1960 American television film

The Tempest is a 1960 American TV movie based on the play by William Shakespeare. Airing on NBC, it was directed by George Schaefer, who said the play was ideal for TV because it could be easily done in 90 minutes.

== Cast ==
- Maurice Evans as Prospero
- Richard Burton as Caliban
- Roddy McDowall as Ariel
- Lee Remick as Miranda
- Tom Poston as Trinculo
