= The Farmer's Daughter (1962 film) =

1962 American TV film

The Farmer's Daughter is a 1962 American TV film starring Peter Lawford and Lee Remick.

== Cast ==
- Peter Lawford as Glen Morley
- Lee Remick as Katrin Holstrom
- Charles Bickford as Clancy
- Cornelia Otis Skinner as Mrs Morley
- Jerome Cowan as Finley
- Milton Selzer as Adolph
- Murray Hamilton as Nordick
- Thomas Chalmers as Johnson

== Production ==
The film was a remake of the 1947 film. Peter Lawford was brother-in-law of President John F. Kennedy at the time.
