= Lady Randolph Churchill =

American-born British socialite (1854–1921)

Lady Randolph Churchill CI RRC DStJ
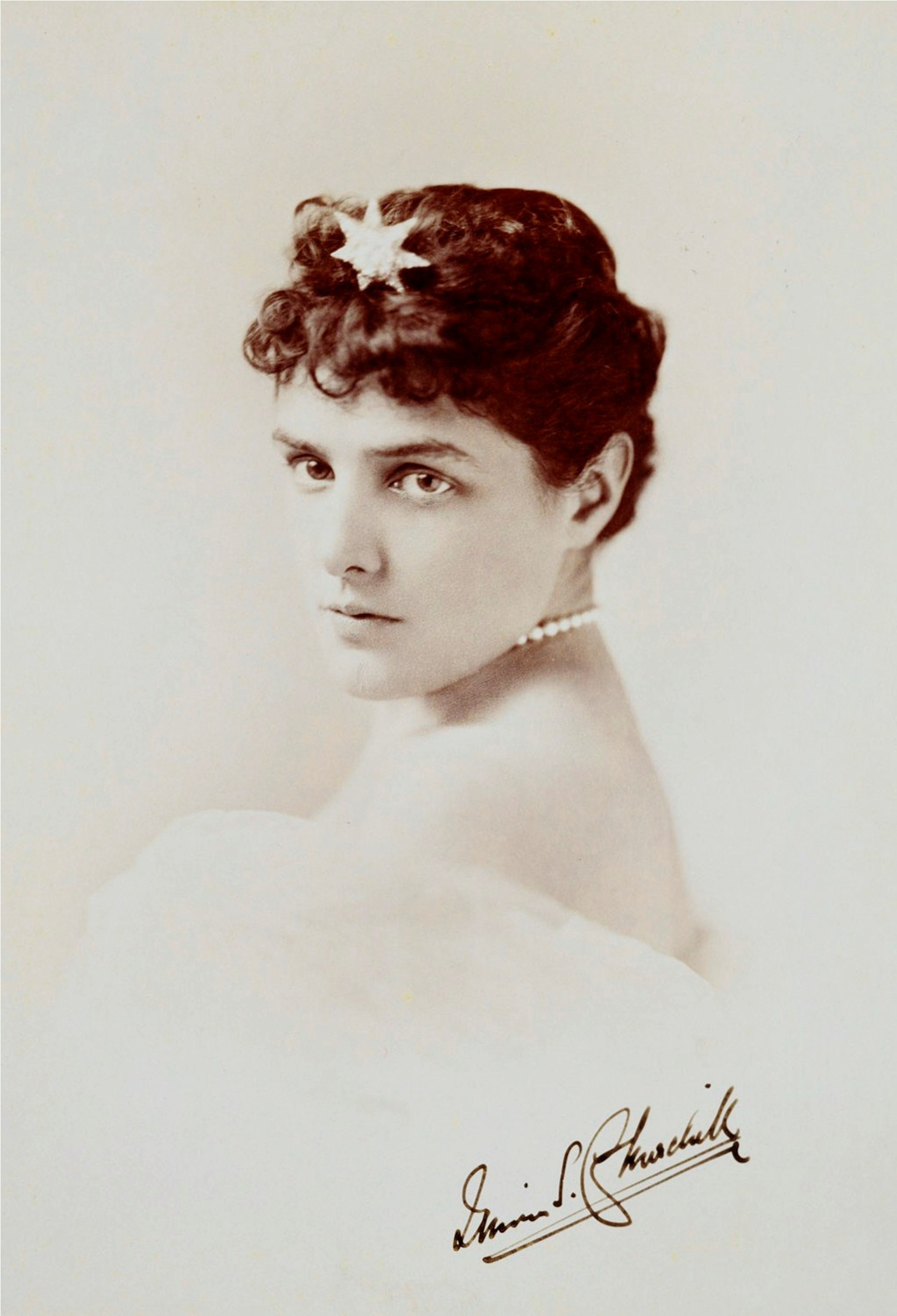
- Photograph by José María Mora, 1880s
- Born: Jeanette Jerome; 9 January 1854; Brooklyn, New York, U.S.
- Died: 29 June 1921 (aged 67); London, England
- Buried: St Martin's Church, Bladon
- Spouses: Lord Randolph Churchill (m. 1874; died 1895); George Cornwallis-West (m. 1900; div. 1914); Montagu Porch (m. 1918)
- Issue: Sir Winston Churchill; Jack Churchill
- Father: Leonard Jerome
- Mother: Clarissa Hall

Jennie Jerome Churchill (Note: She was born as 'Jeanette Jerome', but her legal given name became her nickname Jennie, following the 1874 marriage license bearing witness to her union with Lord Randolph Spencer-Churchill, making her married name 'Jennie Jerome Churchill'. Accessed on ancestry.com on 21 January 2017.) CI RRC DStJ (born Jeanette Jerome; later Mrs. Cornwallis-West; 9 January 1854 – 29 June 1921), known as Lady Randolph Spencer-Churchill, (Note: This British person has the barrelled surname Spencer-Churchill, but is known by the surname Churchill.) was an American-born British socialite, the wife of Lord Randolph Churchill, and the mother of British prime minister Winston Churchill.

Jennie published her memoirs in 1908. In 1909, her theatrical play His Borrowed Plumes debuted in The Globe Theatre. Although Mrs Patrick Campbell produced and took the lead role in the play, it was a commercial failure. Jennie served as the chair of the hospital committee for the American Women's War Relief Fund, starting in 1914. Her organization helped fund and staff two hospitals during World War I.

== Early life ==
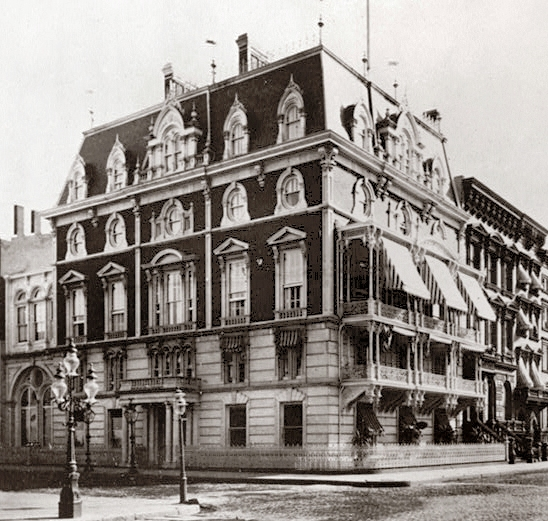
The Jerome Mansion on Madison Avenue, New York City (c. 1878)

Jeanette Jerome was born in the Cobble Hill section of Brooklyn in 1854, the second of four daughters (one died in childhood) of financier, sportsman, and speculator Leonard Jerome and his wife Clarissa "Clara", daughter of Ambrose Hall, a landowner. Jerome's father was of Huguenot extraction, his forebears having emigrated to America from the Isle of Wight in 1710. Hall family lore insists that Jennie had Haudenosaunee (Iroquois) ancestry through her maternal grandmother; however, there is no research or evidence to corroborate this. She was raised in Brooklyn, (Note: Brooklyn was an independent city prior to the consolidation of the cities of New York (then Manhattan and the Bronx) and Brooklyn with the largely rural areas of Queens and Staten Island in 1898.) Manhattan, Paris and London. She had two surviving sisters, Clarita (1851–1935) and Leonie (1859–1943). Another sister, Camille (1855–1863) died when Jennie was nine.

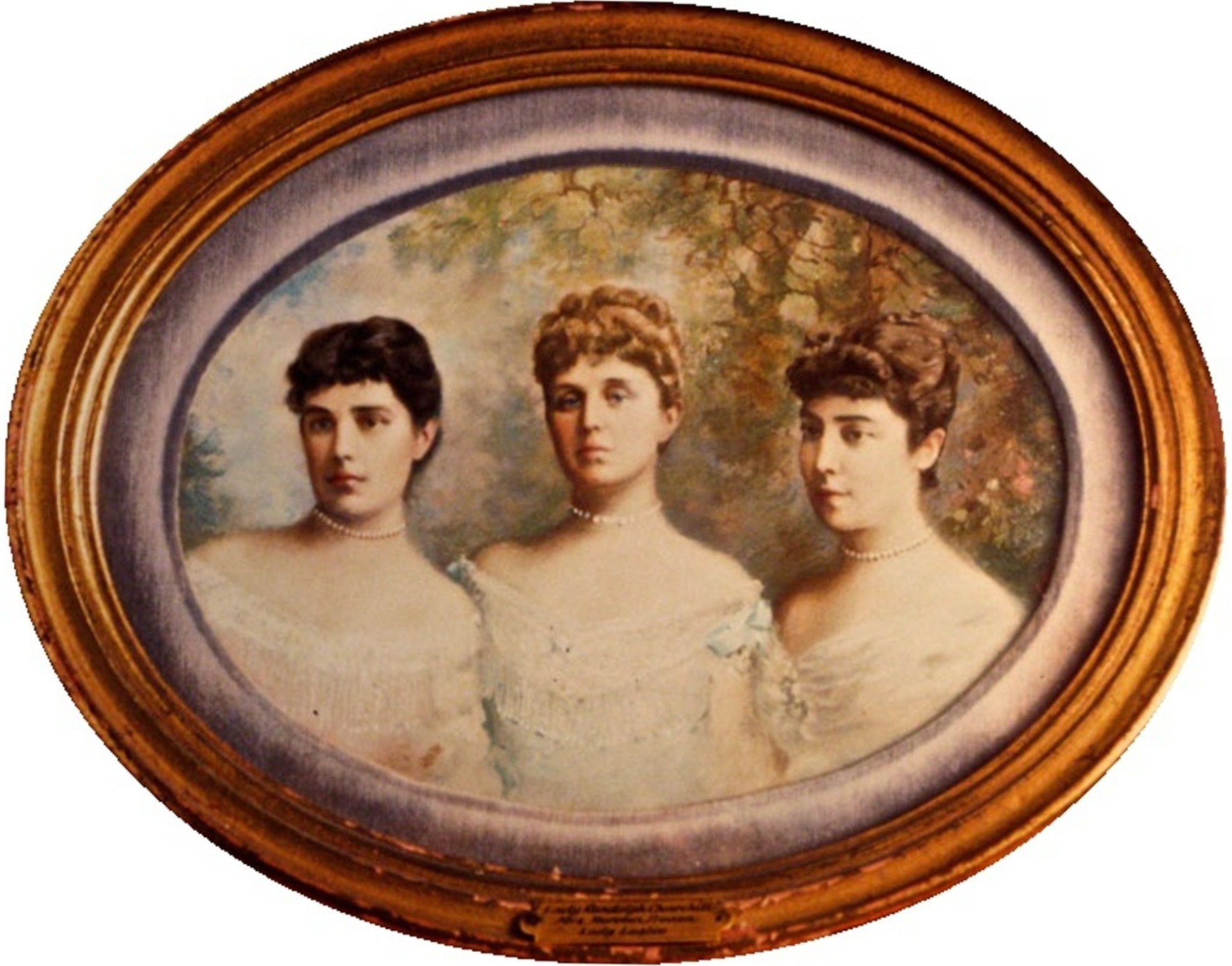
The Jerome sisters: Jennie (1854–1921), Clara (1851–1935) and Leonie (1859–1943)

There is some disagreement regarding the time and place of her birth. A plaque at 426 Henry St. gives her year of birth as 1850, not 1854. However, on 9 January 1854, the Jeromes lived nearby at number 8 Amity Street (since renumbered as 197). It is believed that the Jeromes were temporarily staying at the Henry Street address, which was owned by Leonard's brother Addison, and that Jennie was born there during a snowstorm.

Jerome was a talented amateur pianist, having been tutored as a girl by Stephen Heller, a friend of Chopin. Heller believed that his young pupil was good enough to attain "concert standard" with the necessary "hard work", of which, according to author Mary S. Lovell, he was not confident she was capable.

== Personal life ==
She was a noted beauty; an admirer, Lord d'Abernon, said that there was "more of the panther than of the woman in her look."

=== First marriage and children ===
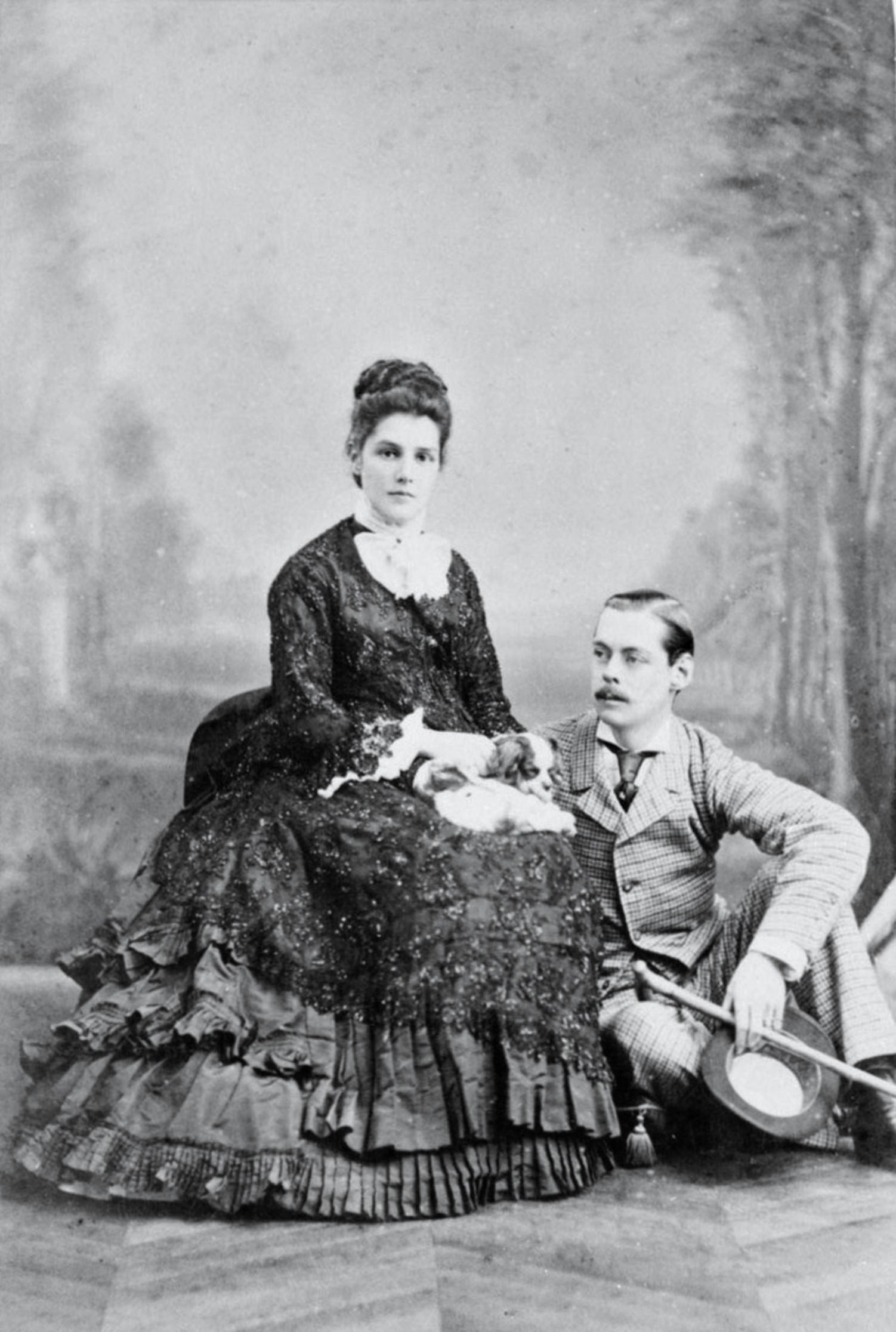
Lord and Lady Randolph (pregnant with Winston) in Paris (1874) by Georges Penabert

Jerome was married for the first time on 15 April 1874, aged 20, at the British Embassy in Paris, to Lord Randolph Churchill, the third son of John Spencer-Churchill, 7th Duke of Marlborough, and Lady Frances Vane. The couple had met at a sailing regatta on the Isle of Wight in August 1873, having been introduced by the Prince of Wales, the future King Edward VII.

Although they became engaged within three days of this initial meeting, the marriage was delayed for months while their parents argued over settlements. By this marriage, she was properly known as 'Lady Randolph Churchill' and would have been addressed in conversation as Lady Randolph.

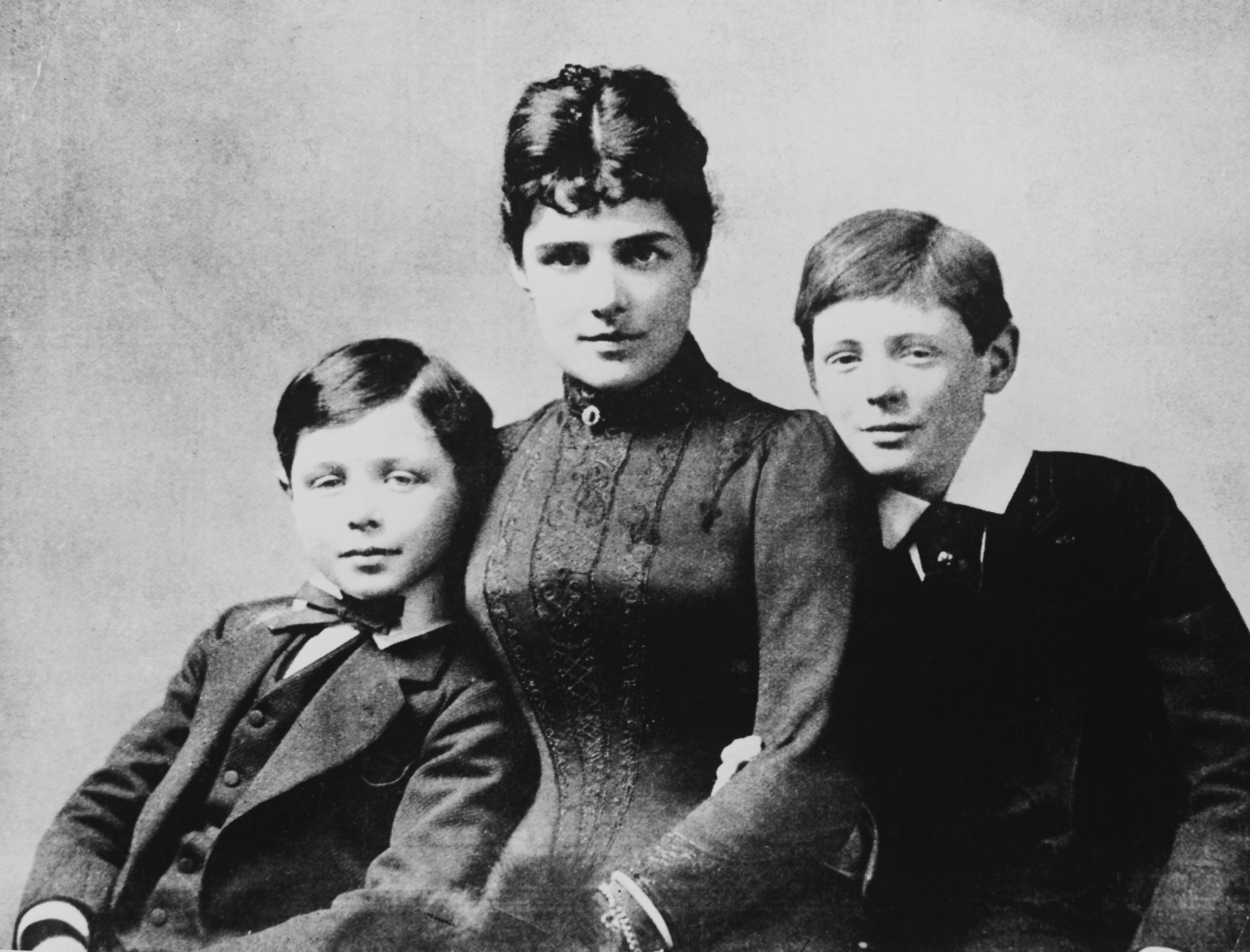
Lady Randolph with her two sons, John and Winston, 1889

The Churchills had two sons: Winston (1874–1965), and John (1880–1947). Winston, the future prime minister, was born less than eight months after the marriage. Amongst his biographers, there are varied opinions on whether he was conceived before the marriage (notably William Manchester), or born two months prematurely after Lady Randolph "had a fall". When asked about the circumstances of his birth, Winston Churchill replied: "Although present on the occasion, I have no clear recollection of the events leading up to it". Rumours also circulated about the parentage of Winston's younger brother John, as Lady Randolph's sisters initially believed that the biological father of the second son, John (1880–1947), was Evelyn Boscawen, 7th Viscount Falmouth, although that was mostly discredited due to the boys' striking likeness to Randolph Churchill and to each other.

Lady Randolph is believed to have had numerous lovers during her marriage, including the Prince of Wales, Milan I of Serbia, Prince Karl Kinsky, and Herbert von Bismarck.

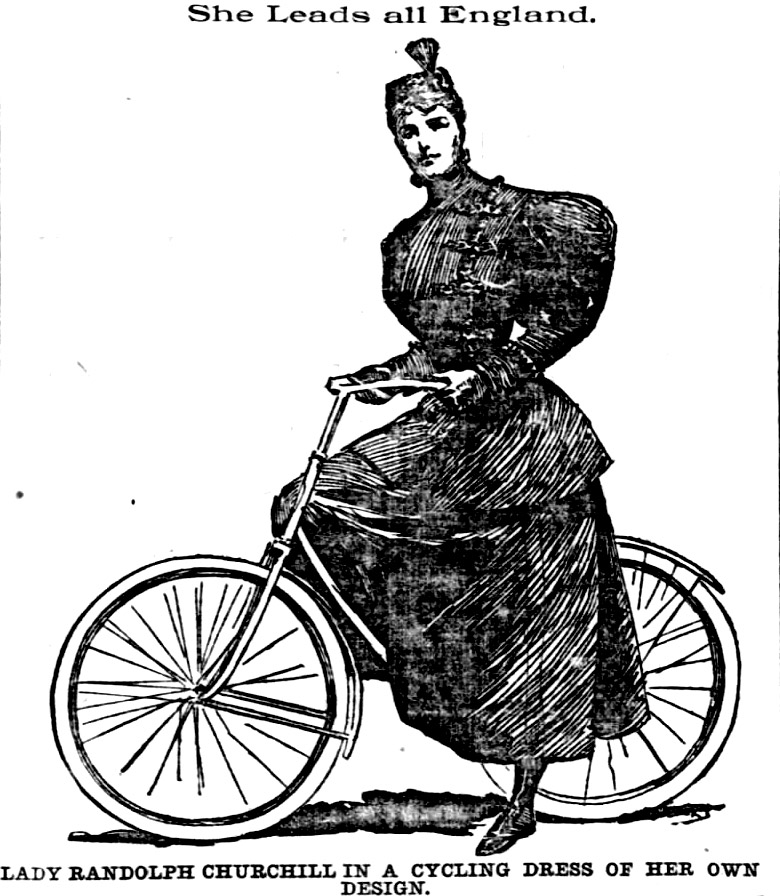
Newspaper drawing of Lady Randolph astride a bicycle, 1895 (Note: The mass-produced safety bicycle was a novel innovation in the 1890s, amongst other things enabling more freedom for modern young women of the time. See History of the bicycle.)

As was the custom of the day in her social class, Lady Randolph played a limited role in her sons' upbringing, relying largely upon nannies, especially Elizabeth Everest. Winston worshipped his mother, writing her numerous letters during his time at school and begging her to visit him, which she rarely did. He wrote about her in My Early Life: "She shone for me like the evening star. I loved her dearly – but at a distance". After he became an adult, they became good friends and strong allies, to the point where Winston regarded her almost as a political mentor, and "on even terms, more like brother and sister than mother and son".

Lady Randolph was well-respected and influential in the highest British social and political circles. She was said to be intelligent, witty, and quick to laughter. It was said that Queen Alexandra especially enjoyed her company, although Lady Randolph had been involved in an affair with her husband the king, which was well known to Alexandra. Through her family contacts and her extramarital romantic relationships, Lady Randolph greatly helped her husband's early career, as well as that of her son Winston.

Lord Randolph died in 1895, aged 45.

=== Second marriage ===
Lord Randolph's death freed Jennie to move on effortlessly despite her lack of money; she mixed in the highest London society circles. Attending a weekend party in July 1898 hosted by Daisy Warwick, Jennie was introduced to George Cornwallis-West, a captain in the Scots Guards who was just 16 days older than her own son Winston; he was instantly smitten, and they spent much time together. Cornwallis-West and Jennie were married on 28 July 1900 at St Paul's Church, Knightsbridge.

In 1908, she wrote her memoirs, The Reminiscences of Lady Randolph Churchill.

Cornwallis-West doted on Jennie, amorously nicknaming her "pussycat". However, they drifted apart and Cornwallis-West, who was a financial failure in the City, slowly fell out of love with his wife, who was old enough to be his mother. Short of money, Jennie contemplated selling the family home in Hertfordshire to move into the Ritz Hotel in Piccadilly. Cornwallis-West was in fragile health, and recuperated at the Swiss skiing resort of St Moritz. Jennie took to writing plays for the West End, in many of which the star was Mrs. Patrick Campbell.

In 1909, when American impresario Charles Frohman became sole manager of The Globe Theatre, the first production was His Borrowed Plumes, written by Jennie. Although Mrs Patrick Campbell produced and took the lead role in the play, it was a commercial failure. It was at this point that Campbell began an affair with Jennie’s husband, George Cornwallis-West.

Jennie separated from Cornwallis-West in 1912, and they were divorced in April 1914, whereupon Cornwallis-West married Mrs. Campbell. Jennie dropped the surname Cornwallis-West, and resumed, by deed poll, the name Lady Randolph Churchill.

=== Third marriage ===
On 1 June 1918 she was married for a third time, to Montagu Phippen Porch (1877–1964), a member of the British Civil Service in Nigeria, who was younger than her son Winston by three years. At the end of World War I, Porch resigned from the colonial service. After Jennie's death, in 1921, he returned to West Africa, where his business investments had proven successful.

== Philanthropy ==
Around 1900, Jennie became well known for chartering the hospital ship Maine to care for those wounded in the Second Boer War. She headed the effort to charter the ship in partnership with two American-born socialites residing in London: Jennie Goodell Blow and Fanny Ronalds. For this work, she was awarded the decoration of the Royal Red Cross (RRC) in the South Africa Honours list published on 26 June 1902. She received the decoration in person from King Edward VII on 2 October 1902 during a visit to Balmoral Castle.

In 1911, Jennie organised the Shakespeare Memorial National Theatre Ball which aimed to raise funds for a national theatre dedicated to shakespeare.

Jennie served as the chair of the hospital committee for the American Women's War Relief Fund starting in 1914. This organization helped fund and staff two hospitals during World War I.

== Death ==
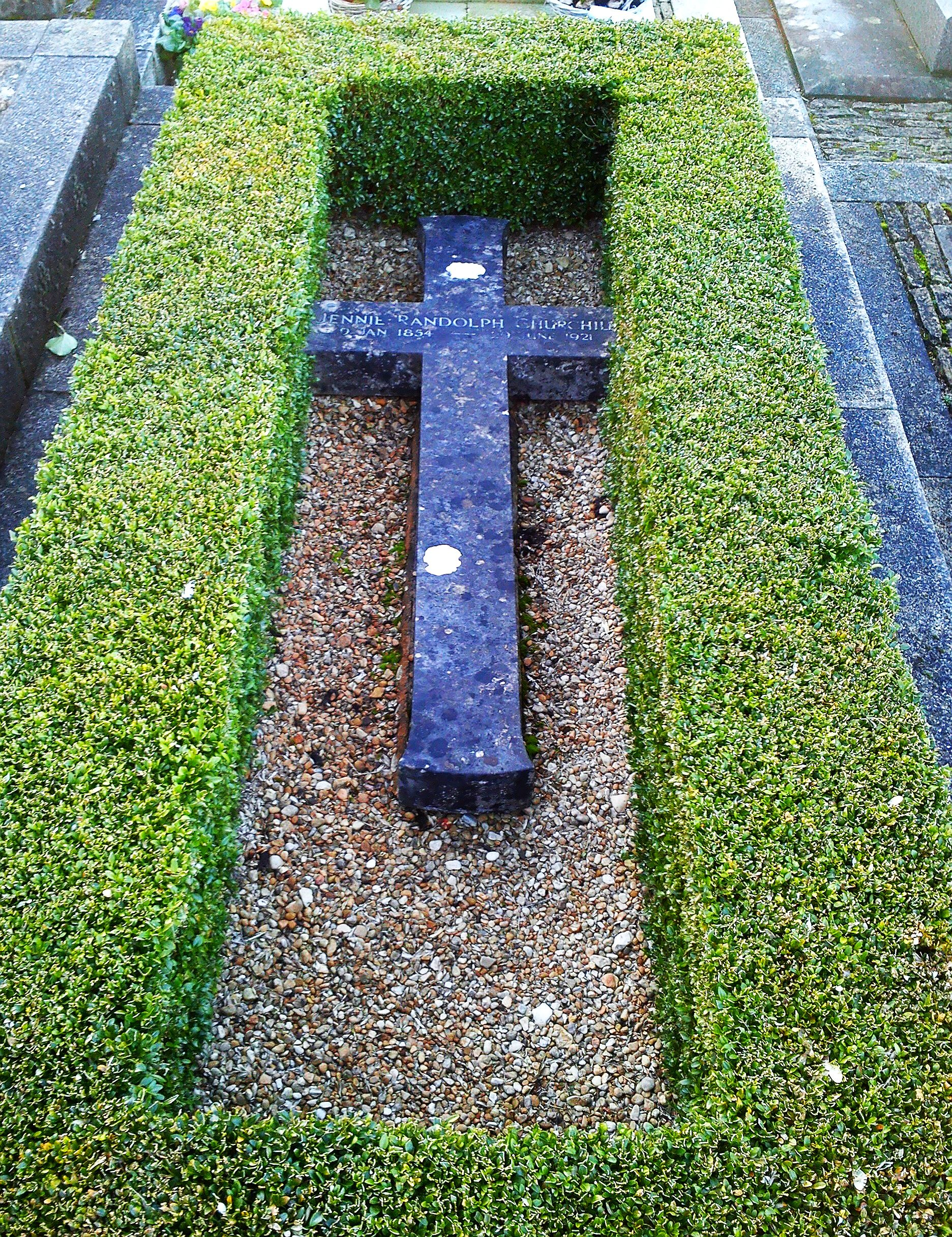
Jennie's grave at St Martin's Church, Bladon

In May 1921, while Montagu Porch was away in Africa, Jennie slipped while coming down a friend's staircase wearing new high-heeled shoes, breaking her ankle. Gangrene set in, and her left leg was amputated above the knee on 10 June. At age 67, she died at her home at 8 Westbourne Street in London on 29 June, following a haemorrhage of an artery in her thigh resulting from the amputation.

She was buried in the Churchill family plot at St Martin's Church, Bladon, Oxfordshire, next to her first husband.

== Cocktail misattribution ==
The invention of the Manhattan cocktail is sometimes attributed to Jennie Churchill, who supposedly asked a bartender to make a special drink to celebrate the election of Samuel J. Tilden to the New York governorship in 1874. However, there is some dispute over whether the drink was invented by the Manhattan Club (an association of New York Democrats) on that occasion, if Jennie promoted the idea, or if it was misattributed.

== In popular culture ==
During the 2014-2015 exhibition at London's National Portrait Gallery, she was featured among the high-profile American heiresses to marry into British aristocracy. Also included in the exhibition were Margaret Leiter (married to the 19th Earl of Suffolk), Mary Leiter (married to the 1st Marquess Curzon of Kedleston), May Cuyler (married to Sir Philip Grey Egerton, 12th Bt), Consuelo Yznaga (married to the 8th Duke of Manchester), Consuelo Vanderbilt (married to the 9th Duke of Marlborough and to Jacques Balsan), Laura Charteris (married to the 10th Duke of Marlborough) and Cornelia Martin (married to the 4th Earl of Craven).

== Portrayals ==
- Jennie Churchill was portrayed by Anne Bancroft in the film Young Winston (1972) and by Lee Remick in the British television series Jennie: Lady Randolph Churchill (1974).

== Works ==
- The Reminiscences of Lady Randolf Churchill (1908)

== See also ==
- The Anglo-Saxon Review, a quarterly miscellany edited by Lady Randolph Churchill
