= Gustav Eckstein (psychologist) =

- Born: October 26, 1890
- Died: September 23, 1981 (aged 90)

Gustav Eckstein was an American medical doctor, dentist, writer, scientist, and professor.

== Biography ==
Eckstein was born on 26 October 1890 in Cincinnati, Ohio, USA. Some of his books included

- In Peace Japan Breeds War (1927)
- Noguchi (1931) - a biography on Hideyo Noguchi - Japanese-American microbiologist
- Lives (1932)
- Kettle (1933)
- Everyday Miracle (1934)
- Hokusai (1935)
- Canary (1936)
- Christmas Eve (1938)
- Friends of Mine (containing Lives and Canary) (1942)
- The Pet Shop (1944) and
- The Body Has a Head (1969), a best-seller.

He died in 1981.

== In popular culture ==
The character of Prof. Metz in Kaufman and Hart's 1939 play The Man Who Came to Dinner is based on Eckstein, only with cockroaches in the place of canaries.

In the 1993 film Groundhog Day, Phil Connors, the character played by Bill Murray, is seen reading the book The Body Has a Head. The book can also be seen laying on the psychotherapist’s (played by Robin Williams) coffee table in the 1997 movie Good Will Hunting.
