= A Severed Head (film) =

- Directed by: Dick Clement
- Written by: Frederic Raphael
- Based on: A Severed Head by Iris Murdoch
- Produced by: Elliott Kastner; Alan Ladd, Jr. Denis Holt
- Starring: Lee Remick; Richard Attenborough; Ian Holm; Claire Bloom
- Cinematography: Austin Dempster
- Edited by: Peter Weatherley
- Music by: Stanley Myers
- Distributed by: Columbia Pictures
- Release dates: December 1970 (UK); 28 March 1971 (USA)
- Running time: 98 minutes
- Country: United Kingdom
- Language: English

A Severed Head is a 1970 British comedy-drama film directed by Dick Clement, and starring Claire Bloom, Lee Remick, Richard Attenborough, and Ian Holm. It was written by Frederic Raphael based on the 1961 novel of the same name by Iris Murdoch.

== Plot ==
The story is set in and around London.

Antonia is the pampered wife of an upper class wine merchant Martin Lynch-Gibbon. She tells her husband that she is in love with their best friend psychiatrist Palmer Anderson. Palmer and Antonia wish to deal with the situation in a civilized manner by remaining friends with Martin.

Meanwhile, Martin tries to keep his mistress, Georgie Hands, a secret.

Palmer's sister Honor Klein is met at a railway station by Martin instead of Palmer. Honor, who once taught Georgie at Oxford University, tells Palmer and Antonia about the affair between her former student and Martin. Honor then introduces Georgie to Martin's womanizing brother Alexander. This is just the start of the various liaisons.

Martin visits his sculptor brother Alexander who lives in a large suburban villa.

Georgie works with historic looms in the Royal College of Art in a room overlooking the Albert Memorial.

Martin, Antonia, Palmer and Georgie go for a posh meal together. Georgie can't stand the arrangement and runs off. Martin goes home, and Honor is at the dinner table eating fruit. She has an unsheathed samurai sword. She demonstrates her skill with the sword.

Martin finds Alexander and Georgie together in her college studio and gets annoyed. When Alexander leaves, he proposes to Georgie. When he goes home, Alexander and Antonia are in his bed. They have a casual conversation.

== Cast ==
- Lee Remick as Antonia (Tony) Lynch-Gibbon
- Richard Attenborough as Palmer Anderson
- Ian Holm as Martin Lynch-Gibbon
- Claire Bloom as Honor Klein
- Jennie Linden as Georgie Hands
- Clive Revill as Alexander Lynch-Gibbon
- Ann Firbank as Rosemary Lynch-Gibbon
- Rosamund Greenwood as Miss Seelhaft
- Constance Lorne as Miss Hernshaw
- Nerys Hughes as nurse

== Opening credits ==
The opening credits feature accurate dolls of each cast member in turn, rotating against a black background.

== Reception ==
The Monthly Film Bulletin wrote: "Dick Clement's direction, Richard Macdonald's decor and Frederic Raphacl's screenplay all seem determined to inject some specious glamour into the novel's academic milieu and style. ... Infidelity to a novel is no cardinal sin, but Clement's film seems unable to substitute any vitality of its own for what it throws out of Murdoch. ... A few inventive gags – Martin stuffing a lipstick-stained handkerchief down a pillar-box, the studious grunts and nods of the wine tasters – consolidate the comic talent shown in Clement's first film Otley. lan Holm, too, survives the debris, perfectly catching Martin Lynch-Gibbon's air of harassed civility. But it's a pity that enjoyment of A Severed Head should involve so much salvage work."

Variety wrote: "This Is a very upper-class and intellectually snobbish film about 'civilized copulation'."

The Radio Times Guide to Films gave the film 3/5 stars, writing: "Though not a patch on Iris Murdoch's 1961 novel, nor its subsequent stage adaptation, this is still an amusing, sophisticated comedy which, in its highly polished way, recalls Ross Hunter's Hollywood films of the 1950s and 1960s."

Leslie Halliwell said: "Unwisely boisterous screen version of a slyly academic novel; tolerably sophisticated for those who don't know the original."
