= Jesse (film) =

- Genre: Drama
- Written by: James Lee Barrett
- Directed by: Glenn Jordan
- Starring: Lee Remick; Scott Wilson; Richard Marcus; Priscilla Lopez; Kevin Conway; Albert Salmi
- Music by: David Shire
- Country of origin: United States
- Original language: English

Production
- Production locations: McNeal, Arizona; Lowell, Arizona; Bisbee, Arizona; Warren, Arizona; Tucson, Arizona
- Running time: 100 minutes
- Production company: Republic Television

Original release
- Network: CBS
- Release: October 4, 1988

Jesse is a 1988 American TV movie starring Lee Remick.

== Premise ==
A nurse in a small town that has no doctor is arrested for practicing medicine without a licence. The arrest aggravates tension between the nurse and her husband; however, when she insists on a jury trial, he winds up supporting her. The case is taken to trial in a larger town. She is found not guilty.

== Cast ==
- Lee Remick as Jesse Maloney
- Scott Wilson as Sam Maloney
- Richard Marcus as Ray Butler
- Priscilla Lopez as Martha
- Richard Erdman as Dr. Adams
- Kevin Conway as Ken Brand
- Albert Salmi as Sheriff Bill Sommers
- Nick Young as Sheriff (uncredited)

== Production ==
It was based on a true story and filmed in Arizona.

The movie was directed by Glenn Jordan, who worked with Remick in The Women's Room and Toughlove. He took the project to Remick who said "It appealed to us both, I think, for the same reasons - because of the basic core of what it's about, the sort of Frank Capra-esque quality of it, of the little guy taking on the big government machine and winning. I don't want to ennoble it too much, but it's about the strength of humanity of this woman as opposed to the cold, inhumane aspect of the law that said she shouldn't help anybody, under those circumstances."

== Reception ==
The Los Angeles Times said "Remick looks as radiant as always; it's hard to believe that someone who's called to accident sites in the middle of the night could look so fresh and vital. Too bad we can't say the same for the movie itself."
