= Pamela Kosh =

American stage actress, television actress, and model

Pamela Kosh (also known as Pamela K. Gilmore; October 1, 1928 – May 4, 2022 (Note: Some sources indicate a birth date of March 13, 1930, though her obituary states the 1928 date.)) was a British-American character actress and former stage actress, pioneering female stage director, and magazine model. She had a career in television spanning over forty years (between the 1980s and 2010s).

She was known for a wide variety of roles in television and is best known for playing Lavinia Peach in Days of Our Lives, Mrs. Carmichael and Jessel in Star Trek: The Next Generation, Flora on The King of Queens, Martha on Dr. Quinn, Medicine Woman, and Miss Simpson in both Saved by the Bell and Saved by the Bell: The New Class.

== Early life ==
Pamela Kosh was born Pansy Amy Kosh on October 1, 1928 in Crayford in Kent to Alfred and Rose Kosh, the youngest of six children. At an early age she aspired to attend the Royal Academy of Dramatic Arts (RADA), but her family decided it would be more practical to send her to Bexleyheath School to learn secretarial skills. She hated working as a secretary but it would lead her to jobs associated with scripts, publishing, and the theater.

== Career ==
=== Model, stage actress, director ===
Starting an amateur career as an actress, she joined both the Austral Players and the Erith Playhouse, eventually landing a job with ITV Television. She was active in several repertory theatre groups in England as an actress and director.

She emigrated to the United States in 1960, with ITV getting her a job in New York. She later worked as both a stage actress and magazine model, appearing in many national magazines. She worked in theatrical companies in Boston, Miami, and Los Angeles.

She became a naturalized American citizen in 1968; in that same year, she married stage actor Walter "Walt" Gilmore, whom she'd met in 1967 while she and he were performing in a play together in a local theatre situated in Southern California.

She was the director of a 1968 production of The Curious Savage at the Burbank Little Theatre. She was the first woman to direct a major production at the theater in its 16-year history and was lauded for her "keen respect for the play's delicate virtues".

Between 1973 and 1981, she and her husband both established and managed the now defunct Golden Mall Playhouse, which during its tenure was located in Burbank, California. She was active at the theater, directing the 1974 production of Wait Until Dark. She played the role of Dolly Dibble/Lady Macbeth in their 1977 production of John Patrick's Macbeth Did It and the role of Edith Lambert in their 1979 production of Never Too Late. In 1979, she starred with Hilary Miller in James Prideaux's Lemonade at the Theatre Exchange in North Hollywood. The Golden Mall Playhouse ended in 1981 after the city used eminent domain to condemn and demolish it to make way for a Holiday Inn.

=== Later television career ===
From 1985 to 2017, she became a character actress on television and in films, often portraying socialites, matriarchs, school-teachers, and neighbors, and everything from charladies to two queens of England, Queen Elizabeth and Queen Victoria.

She had a recurring role as Lavinia Peach on Days of Our Lives, appearing in almost fifty episodes over six years (from 1986 to 1992).

She played landlady Mrs. Carmichael and later Data's housekeeper Jessel in Star Trek: The Next Generation. Tor.com said she was "delightfully harumphy" in the latter role.

On Saved by the Bell she was known as the near-deaf "batty and British" Mrs. Simpson and also appeared in the pilot for Saved by the Bell: The New Class.

She also had a recurring role as Martha on Dr. Quinn, Medicine Woman, and as Flora in several episodes of The King of Queens from 2001 to 2006. She appeared in other roles in the latter show, totalling ten episodes overall. She was in two episodes of Gilmore Girls and three episodes of Ned and Stacey. In Frasier she played romance novelist Dierdre Sauvage who lived in Frasier's building and was besotted by Martin Crane. She portrayed Queen Victoria in Northern Exposure.

Some of her other appearances include guest-starring and recurring roles in shows such as Murder, She Wrote, Hotel, ER, Charmed, Beyond Belief: Fact or Fiction, Mama's Family, My Name is Earl, Monk, Dynasty, Jake and the Fatman, Murphy Brown, Charmed, L.A. Law, The Bernie Mac Show, Pushing Daisies, The Division, and Matlock. She also appeared in Desperate Housewives.

=== Other roles ===
Her film roles included Star! (1968), Dark Holiday (1989), Sweet Temptation (1996), and Double Take (2001) - and she had a voice role in Superman vs. The Elite.

== Later life and death ==
Kosh was falsely reported to have died on October 21, 2020, due to confusion with another woman of the same name who lived in Tucson, Arizona. (Note: This was later proven false and retracted, though some sources may still list that date.) Her actual date of death was on May 4, 2022.
