= Toughlove =

- Genre: Drama
- Written by: Karen Hall
- Directed by: Glenn Jordan
- Starring: Lee Remick; Bruce Dern; Jason Patric
- Music by: Paul Chihara
- Country of origin: United States
- Original language: English

Production
- Executive producers: Charles W. Fries; Irv Wilson
- Producer: Ervin Zavada
- Cinematography: Gayne Rescher
- Editor: Paul Rubell
- Running time: 100 minutes
- Production company: Fries Entertainment

Original release
- Network: ABC
- Release: October 13, 1985

Toughlove is a 1985 American TV movie starring Lee Remick and directed by Glenn Jordan.

== Premise ==
High-school assistant-principal Rob Charters and his wife Jan discover that their son Gary is into alcohol and worse drugs. Gary is dating fellow addict Kristen Marsh...whose mother Darleen recommends the Toughlove organization to Rob and Jan.

== Cast ==
- Lee Remick as Jan Charters
- Bruce Dern as Rob Charters
- Jason Patric as Gary Charters
- Eric Schiff as Scott Charters
- Dedee Pfeiffer as Kristen Marsh
- Piper Laurie as Darlene Marsh
- Dana Elcar as Max Wiley
- Jim Haynie as Lloyd
- Cyndi James Gossett as Ms. Hobart

== Production ==
Toughlove was an organization founded in 1981 by family therapists Phyllis and David York. When the film was made, it claimed it had 1,500 chapters in the United States and 500,000 members worldwide.

Lee Remick was approached to do it by Glenn Jordan. "The piece interested me on its merits as a drama and I found the subject matter to have a great deal of power," she said. "It has an emotional impact. It's a subject I think will touch an awful lot of people, which is a sad commentary on our society and kids."

The film was controversial because it was seen to embrace a movement that urged parents to get tough with abusive teenagers. The screenwriter, Karen Hall, based the script in part on incidents from real life Toughlove meetings.

== Reception ==
The New York Times critic said the film "is only sporadically as powerful as it obviously intended to be. One problem is that it has the look of the typical TV movie, a kind of sanitized version of reality. Problems are reviewed but not forcefully conveyed." He also felt it was compromised by the need to have a happy ending, adding "The time is long past due, it would seem, for someone to get tough with the networks about the abuse of tired formulas."

Movie historian Leonard Maltin described the picture as "A promising drama, helped greatly by sincere performances, but undermined by a manipulative script...Mostly a suburban update of Hud; in which Patric and Pfeiffer share the Paul Newman role, Dern and Laurie share Melvyn Douglas's, Remick has Patricia Neal's, and Schiff is in Brandon deWilde's."
