= Dark Holiday =

- Genre: Drama; Thriller
- Written by: Gene LePere; Rose Leiman Goldemberg
- Directed by: Lou Antonio
- Starring: Lee Remick; Norma Aleandro; Tony Goldwyn; Pamela Kosh
- Theme music composer: Paul Chihara
- Country of origin: United States
- Original language: English

Production
- Executive producer: Lou Antonio
- Producer: Peter Nelson
- Production location: West Virginia
- Cinematography: Larry Pizer
- Editor: Gary Griffin
- Running time: 100 min.
- Production companies: Peter Nelson-Lou Antonio Productions; Finnegan/Pinchuk Productions; Orion Television

Original release
- Network: NBC
- Release: May 1, 1989

Dark Holiday is a 1989 American TV movie starring Lee Remick. It was Remick's last performance.

== Plot ==
An American tourist winds up in a Turkish prison.

== Cast ==
- Lee Remick as Gene LePere
- Norma Aleandro as Isha
- Tony Goldwyn as Ken Horton
- Roy Thinnes as Jimmy
- John Standing as Charnaud
- Jim Antonio as Edwin Kant
- Kim Lonsdale as Nancy Hurst
- Ian Abercrombie as Captain
- Tuck Milligan as Andrews
- Vachik Mangassarian as Customs Chief
- Hildy Brooks as Young woman
- Pamela Kosh as Connie Devon
- Sirri Murad as Judge
- Anne Cooper as Marie
- Efrat Lavie as Curator
- Sharon Barr as Hikmet
- Tracy Kolis as Mother with baby
- Richard Assad as Customs Man
- Irene Roseen as Travel Agent
- Shaun Toub as Prison soldier
- Reva Rose as American woman
