= Kevin Conway (actor) =

American actor and film director (1942–2020)

- Born: Kevin Brian Conway; May 29, 1942; New York City, New York, U.S.
- Died: February 5, 2020 (aged 77); New York City, New York, U.S.
- Education: HB Studio
- Occupations: Actor, theatre director
- Years active: 1970–2020
- Website: www.kevinconway.com

Kevin Brian Conway (May 29, 1942 – February 5, 2020) was an American actor and theatre director. He won a Drama Desk Award for Outstanding Performance for the Broadway play When You Comin' Back, Red Ryder? (1974), and was nominated for Outstanding Direction of a Play for Mecca (1980).

== Early life ==
Conway was born in New York City, to Helen Margaret (née Sanders), a sales representative, and James John Conway, a mechanic. Conway completed his acting training at HB Studio in New York City.

== Career ==
=== Theatre ===
Conway's off-Broadway credits include One Flew Over the Cuckoo's Nest, One for the Road, The Elephant Man, Other People's Money, and When You Comin' Back, Red Ryder?, for which he received the 1974 Drama Desk Award.

On Broadway, Conway appeared in Indians, Moonchildren, and in revivals of The Plough and the Stars, Of Mice and Men (as George Milton, opposite James Earl Jones as Lennie Small), and Dinner at Eight. In 1980, he was nominated for the Drama Desk Award for Outstanding Direction of a Play (Ted Whitehead's Mecca).

=== Film ===
In his first major screen role, Conway portrayed Roland Weary in the 1972 film Slaughterhouse-Five, based on the Kurt Vonnegut novel.

Among other film roles, Conway played multiple characters in the 1981 horror film The Funhouse; Crum Petree, the irascible mailman in the 1988 film Funny Farm, Frank Papale in the fact-based 2006 Disney football drama Invincible and General Curtis LeMay in the 2000 historical drama Thirteen Days. He played the fictional Buster Kilrain in Ron Maxwell's Civil War duology Gods and Generals and Gettysburg. In 1987, Conway directed the independent film The Sun and the Moon.

=== Television ===
Conway appeared as a blind traveling piano tuner in season 4 episode 13 of Northern Exposure. From 1995 to 2002, Conway was the Control Voice for the revived series of The Outer Limits. He made a guest appearance on Star Trek: The Next Generation as the clone of the legendary Klingon figure Kahless. He guest starred on The Good Wife episodes "Threesome", "Boom" and "Wrongful Termination" as Jonas Stern, a founding partner of the titular character's law firm. He portrayed Seamus O'Reily, the abusive father of Ryan and Cyril O'Reily in the HBO prison drama Oz. He made an appearance as the father of titular brothers Michael and Tommy Caffee as Neal Caffee on the Showtime drama Brotherhood.

Conway was a guest star on JAG in the episode "King of the Fleas" portraying Roscoe Martin, a paraplegic Vietnam vet who confessed to a murder. In “The Martin Baker Fan Club” he returns as Martin, now a mental patient, and faces a charge of second-degree murder. He has also guest starred on three Law & Order series, the original series, two guest appearances on Law & Order: Criminal Intent, and one on Law & Order: Special Victims Unit. He played the man burner Mox Mox in Streets of Laredo and guest starred in the second season of In the Heat of the Night. He also played the father of Jenny (played by Olivia Wilde) in NBC's The Black Donnellys in 2007.

== Death ==
Conway died from a heart attack in Manhattan on February 5, 2020. He was 77.

== Filmography ==
=== Film ===
| Year | Title | Role | Notes |
|---|---|---|---|
| 1971 | Believe in Me | Clancy | |
| 1972 | Slaughterhouse-Five | Roland Weary | |
| 1972 | Portnoy's Complaint | Smolka | |
| 1973 | Shamus | The Kid | |
| 1978 | F.I.S.T. | Vince Doyle | |
| 1978 | Paradise Alley | "Stitch" Mahon | |
| 1981 | The Funhouse | Conrad Straker | |
| 1984 | Flashpoint | Brook | |
| 1988 | Funny Farm | Crum Petree | Uncredited |
| 1988 | Homeboy | Grazziano | |
| 1991 | One Good Cop | Lieutenant Danny Quinn | |
| 1991 | Rambling Rose | Dr. Martinson | |
| 1992 | Jennifer 8 | Chief Citrine | |
| 1993 | Gettysburg | Sergeant Buster Kilrain | |
| 1995 | The Quick and the Dead | Eugene Dred | |
| 1996 | Lawnmower Man 2: Beyond Cyberspace | Jonathan Walker | |
| 1998 | Mercury Rising | FBI Special Agent In Charge Joe Lomax | |
| 1999 | The Confession | Mel Duden | |
| 2000 | Two Family House | Jim O'Neary | |
| 2000 | Thirteen Days | General Curtis LeMay | |
| 2001 | Black Knight | King Leo | |
| 2003 | Gods and Generals | Sergeant Buster Kilrain | |
| 2003 | Mystic River | Theo Savage | Uncredited |
| 2006 | Invincible | Frank "Kingie" Papale | |
| 2007 | American Loser | Bert | |
| 2016 | Is That a Gun in Your Pocket? | Cyrus | |
| 2018 | The Mayo Clinic: Faith-Hope-Science | William Worrall Mayo (voice) | Documentary |
| 2025 | The Gettysburg Address | Daniel Webster (voice) | Documentary |

=== Television ===
| Year | Title | Role | Notes |
|---|---|---|---|
| 1968 | One Life to Live | Earl Brock | |
| 1970 | The Doctors | Gordon Dobbs | Episode #1.1843 |
| 1971 | A World Apart | Bud Whitman | 2 episodes |
| 1971 | Great Performances | Peter Boyle | Episode: "Hogan's Goat" |
| 1973 | Mr. Inside/Mr. Outside | Fence #1 | Television film |
| 1973 | Rx for the Defense | Dr. Packer | Television film |
| 1977 | Visions | James Gregg | Episode: "The Gardener's Son" |
| 1977 | Johnny I Hardly Knew Ye | David Powers | Television film |
| 1977 | The Deadliest Season | George Graff | Television film |
| 1979 | The Scarlet Letter | Roger Chillingworth | Miniseries |
| 1980 | The Lathe of Heaven | Dr. William Haber | Television film |
| 1982 | The Elephant Man | Frederick Treves | Television film |
| 1983 | Rage of Angels | Ken Bailey | Television film |
| 1983 | The Firm | Peter Blau | Episode: "Pilot" |
| 1984 | Something About Amelia | Dr. Kevin Farley | Television film |
| 1984 | Attack on Fear | Richard Ofshe | Television film |
| 1986 | Miami Vice | Commander Fox | Episode: "Walk-Alone" |
| 1988 | Jesse | Ken Brand | Television film |
| 1988 | The Equalizer | John Allenwaite | Episode: "Splinters" |
| 1989 | In the Heat of the Night | Jude Thibodeaux | Episode: "A.K.A. Kelly Kay" |
| 1989–90 | The Beachcombers | Fernley | 2 episodes |
| 1990 | When Will I Be Loved? | Jerry Howard | Television film |
| 1992 | Breaking the Silence | Jack Hastings | Television film |
| 1992 | Star Trek: The Next Generation | Kahless | Episode: "Rightful Heir" |
| 1993 | Northern Exposure | Arlen Briscoe | Episode: "Duets" |
| 1994 | Cobra | Corporal Biggs | Episode: "A Few Dead Men" |
| 1994 | The Whipping Boy | Hold-Your-Nose-Billy | Television film |
| 1995 | New York News | Jim Kowalski | 3 episodes |
| 1995 | Streets of Laredo | Mox Mox | 3 episodes |
| 1995 | Homicide: Life on the Street | Joseph Cardero | Episode: "Heartbeat" |
| 1995–2002 | The Outer Limits | Control Voice | 152 episodes |
| 1996 | Law & Order | Lieutenant John Flynn | Episode: "Corruption" |
| 1996 | Calm at Sunset | Kelly Dobbs | Television film |
| 1997–98 | JAG | Roscoe Martin / Willie Meizer | Episodes: "King of the Fleas" & "The Martin Baker Fan Club" |
| 1998 | Michael Hayes | Mackey | 2 episodes |
| 1999–2000 | Oz | Seamus O'Reily | 6 episodes |
| 2000 | Sally Hemings: An American Scandal | Thomas Paine | Television film |
| 2001 | The Flamingo Rising | Judge Lester, Stunt Pilot | Television film |
| 2001 | Dark Angel | Operative At Warehouse | Episode: "Designate This" |
| 2005, 2010 | Law & Order: Criminal Intent | Jackie Dooley, Frank McNare | 2 episodes |
| 2006 | Brotherhood | Neal Caffee | Episode: "Vivekchaudamani: 51" |
| 2007 | The Black Donnellys | Ian Reilly, Jenny's Pop | 10 episodes |
| 2007 | The Bronx Is Burning | Gabe Paul | 8 episodes |
| 2009 | Life on Mars | Donovan Stamp | Episode: "The Dark Side of the Mook" |
| 2009–11 | The Good Wife | Jonas Stern | 3 episodes |
| 2012 | Person of Interest | George Massey | Episode: "Triggerman" |
| 2017–18 | Who Killed Jane Doe? | The Narrator | 12 episodes |
| 2018 | Unmasked | The Narrator | 3 episodes |
