= Bridge to Silence =

1989 American television film

- Genre: Drama
- Written by: Louisa Burns-Bisogno; Tom Bisogno
- Teleplay by: Louisa Burns-Bisogno
- Directed by: Karen Arthur
- Starring: Lee Remick; Marlee Matlin; Michael O'Keefe
- Music by: Fred Karlin
- Country of origin: United States
- Original languages: English; American Sign Language

Production
- Executive producer: Charles W. Fries
- Producers: Stockton Briggle; Richard Carrothers; Dennis Hennessy (as Dennis D. Hennessy)
- Cinematography: Tom Neuwirth
- Editor: Laurel Ladevich
- Running time: 100 minutes
- Production companies: Briggle, Hennessey, Carrothers & Associates; Fries Entertainment

Original release
- Network: CBS
- Release: April 9, 1989

Bridge to Silence is a 1989 American drama TV movie starring Lee Remick and Marlee Matlin.

== Plot ==
Peg is an actress at an Actors Theatre of the Deaf. after her husband John dies in a car accident, her mother Marge, who always had trouble accepting Peg's deafness, takes in their daughter Lisa while Peg is grieving.

When Peg's father, Al, who always had a better relationship with Peg, finds out that marge wants get legal guardianship of Lisa, he warns Peg and she comes to get her.

That has caused difficulty between Al and Marge. But finally, Marge decides to come to the play opening; something she has never done before. After the play, Peg sees Marge looking at the stage props, they have an emotional talk and reconcile.

== Cast ==
- Josef Sommer as Al
- Lee Remick as Marge Duffield
- Marlee Matlin as Peg Duffield
- Allison Silva as Lisa
- Michael O'Keefe as Dan

== Production ==
The movie was filmed in Toronto and directed by Karen Arthur.

It was the first time Remick had worked with a female director. "Interesting working with a woman," she said. "Not that it's different in terms of her work, she's doing the same thing as men do, but I've just never been in that position. Directors have always been kind of father figures. It's interesting. It's wonderful. She's terrific."

It was one of Remick's final performances.

Remick called Matlin "a wonderful actress. She's so open and kind of instinctive and free . . . curious. It was an interesting experience, which I had some concern about. When I started I thought, you know, what's it going to be like for the two of us to communicate? I do not have sign language at my beck and call. But we did. It was terrific."

== Nominations ==
- Fred Karlin, Primetime Emmy for Dramatic Underscore
- Victoria Burrows, Artios award for Best Casting for TV Movie
