= And No One Could Save Her =

- Genre: Drama; Mystery
- Written by: Anthony Skene
- Directed by: Kevin Billington
- Starring: Lee Remick; Milo O'Shea; Frank Grimes
- Music by: Ron Grainer
- Country of origin: United States; United Kingdom
- Original language: English

Production
- Executive producer: Beryl Vertue
- Producer: William Allyn
- Cinematography: Austin Dempster
- Editor: Keith Palmer
- Running time: 73 minutes
- Production companies: Associated London Films; Robert Stigwood Organization

Original release
- Network: ABC
- Release: February 21, 1973

And No One Could Save Her is a 1973 American TV film directed by Kevin Billington. It was shot in Dublin.

== Plot ==
A woman searches for her husband, who boarded a plane for Ireland and disappeared.

== Cast ==
- Lee Remick as Fern O'Neil
- Frank Grimes as Sam O'Neil
- Milo O'Shea as Patrick Dooley
- Liam Redmond as Fitzgerald
- Shelagh Fraser as Mrs. Benet
- Robert Lang as Beck

== Reception ==
The Los Angeles Times called it "the season's absolute worst made for television movie."
