= The Letter (1982 film) =

- Genre: Drama
- Based on: The Letter; 1927 play by W. Somerset Maugham
- Written by: Lawrence B. Marcus
- Directed by: John Erman
- Starring: Lee Remick; Ian McShane; Jack Thompson
- Music by: Laurence Rosenthal
- Country of origin: United States
- Original language: English

Production
- Executive producer: George Eckstein
- Producers: Anna Cottle; Kip Gowans
- Production locations: Chinatown, Los Angeles, California; Los Angeles County Arboretum & Botanic Garden - 301 N. Baldwin Avenue, Arcadia, California; Stage 21, Warner Brothers Burbank Studios - 4000 Warner Boulevard, Burbank, California; Stage 6, Warner Brothers Burbank Studios - 4000 Warner Boulevard, Burbank, California
- Cinematography: James Crabe
- Editor: Jim Benson
- Running time: 120 minutes
- Production companies: Hajeno Productions; Warner Bros. Television

Original release
- Network: ABC
- Release: May 3, 1982

The Letter is a 1982 American television movie, starring Lee Remick, Ronald Pickup, Jack Thompson, Ian McShane and Christopher Cazenove and directed by John Erman. It is the third film version of the 1927 play of the same title by W. Somerset Maugham.

It screened as part of ABC Theatre.

== Cast ==
- Lee Remick as Leslie Crosbie
- Ronald Pickup as Howard Joyce
- Jack Thompson as Robert Crosbie
- Ian McShane as Geoff
- Christopher Cazenove as Officer Withers
- Kieu Chinh as Chinese Woman
- Wilfrid Hyde-White as Judge
- Sarah Marshall as Dorothy Joyce
- Soon-Tek Oh as Ong
- James Hong as Old Man
- Molly Roden as Warden Larkin

== Production ==
Remick's casting was announced in April 1981. The story had been filmed twice before but Remick said "our version is different because we actually show what happened rather than relying on the woman's explanation."

The movie was an early international role for Australian actor Jack Thompson.

== Reception ==
The Chicago Tribune called it "wickedly wonderful."

The Los Angeles Times called it "quite remarkable...literate, sumptuously produced, beautifully acted."

== Awards ==
Remick was nominated for the Golden Globe Award for Best Actress – Miniseries or Television Film.

The film won the Primetime Emmy Award for Cinematography for a Limited Series or a Special, Costume Design for a Special, and Art Direction for a Limited Series or a Special. Laurence Rosenthal was nominated for Music Composition for a Limited Series or a Special (Dramatic Underscore).
