= Louise Paget =

British humanitarian (1881–1958)

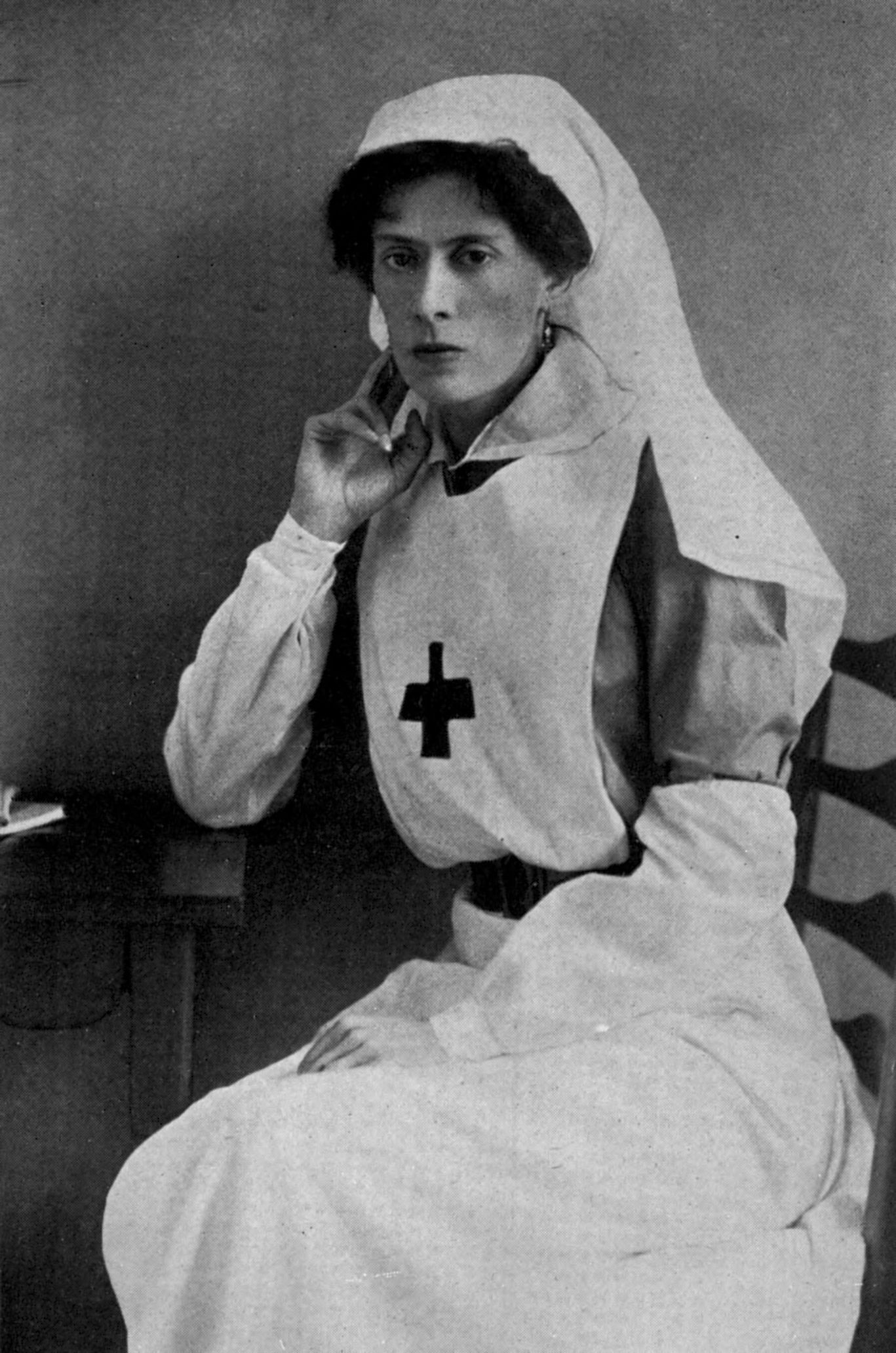
- Born: 9 October 1881
- Died: 24 September 1958 (aged 76); Kingston-upon-Thames, England
- Spouse: Ralph Paget (m. 1907)
- Father: Arthur Paget

Dame Louise Margaret Leila Wemyss, Lady Paget, GBE (9 October 1881 – 24 September 1958) was a British humanitarian, active in the cause of Serbian relief, beginning in World War I, leading the first Serbian Relief Fund unit to Skoplje in November 1914.

== Family ==
The daughter of General Sir Arthur Henry Fitzroy Paget (1851–1928) and his wife, Mary Fiske Paget (née Stevens; died 1919), she married her third cousin once removed, Sir Ralph Spencer Paget, son of Sir Augustus Berkeley Paget and Countess Walburga Ehrengarde Helena von Hohenthal, on 28 October 1907; the union was childless. Louise was great-granddaughter of Henry Paget, Earl of Uxbridge.

== Philanthropic work ==
Ralph Spencer Paget was appointed Knight Commander of the Order of St Michael and St George (KCMG) in 1909 and Louise encouraged him to accept a transfer to the Balkan Kingdom of Serbia in July 1910. Encouraged by Mabel Grujić, the American wife of Slavko Grujić, Serbian Undersecretary for Foreign Affairs, Lady Paget helped set up a military hospital in Belgrade during the First Balkan War (1912–13). In 1914, Paget became the president of the American Women's War Relief Fund. The group, dedicated to helping those hurt in the war, was conceived of as an idea by Paget only three days after the First World War broke out. In 1915 she set up a hospital in Skopje to treat wounded Serbs, but also to help fight the epidemic spreading through Serbia. Lady Paget contracted typhoid fever, but recovered. Paget also helped raise money to support the needs of wounded servicemembers.

Dame Louise Paget was the first recipient of the Medal of Honor of the Federation of Women's Clubs of New York City in 1917; other recipients included humanitarian Evelyn Smalley (1919), activist Carrie Chapman Catt (1922, decoration without the eagle), physicist Marie Curie (1929), Madame Chiang Kai-shek, First Lady of the Republic of China (1939), and Austrian-born pioneer atomic scientist Lise Meitner (1949).

== Honours ==
Louise, Lady Paget was invested as a Dame Grand Cross, Order of the British Empire (GBE) in 1917. In April 1915, she was decorated with the Grand Cordon, Order of St Sava.

== Death ==
She died on 24 September 1958, aged 76, at Kingston-upon-Thames.

== Citations ==
Charles Mosley, editor, Burke's Peerage and Baronetage, 106th edition, 2 volumes (Crans, Switzerland: Burke's Peerage (Genealogical Books) Ltd, 1999), volume 1, pp. 73, 77.

== See also ==
- People on Scottish banknotes
- Elsie Inglis Memorial Maternity Hospital
- Scottish Women's Hospitals for Foreign Service
- Eveline Haverfield – British suffragette and aid worker (1867–1920)
- Elizabeth Ness MacBean Ross – Scottish physician (1878 - 1915)
- Elsie Inglis – Scottish doctor (1864–1917)
- Mabel St Clair Stobart – British suffragist and aid-worker
- Josephine Bedford – Australian philanthropist and WWI ambulance driver (1861-1955)
- Katherine Harley – British suffragist
- Isabel Emslie Hutton – Scottish physician (1887–1960)
