= Rear Window (disambiguation) =

Rear Window is a 1954 film directed by Alfred Hitchcock.

Rear Window also may refer to:

- Rear Window (1998 film), an American television remake of the 1954 film
- "Rear Window" (The Detectives), a 1994 television episode
- "Rear Window" (Roseanne), a 1995 television episode
- "Rear Window" (Tru Calling), a 2004 television episode
- Rear Window Captioning System, a film captioning system for deaf theatregoers

== See also ==
- "Rear Windows '98", a 1998 episode of Diagnosis: Murder
