= Lee Remick =

American actress (1935–1991)

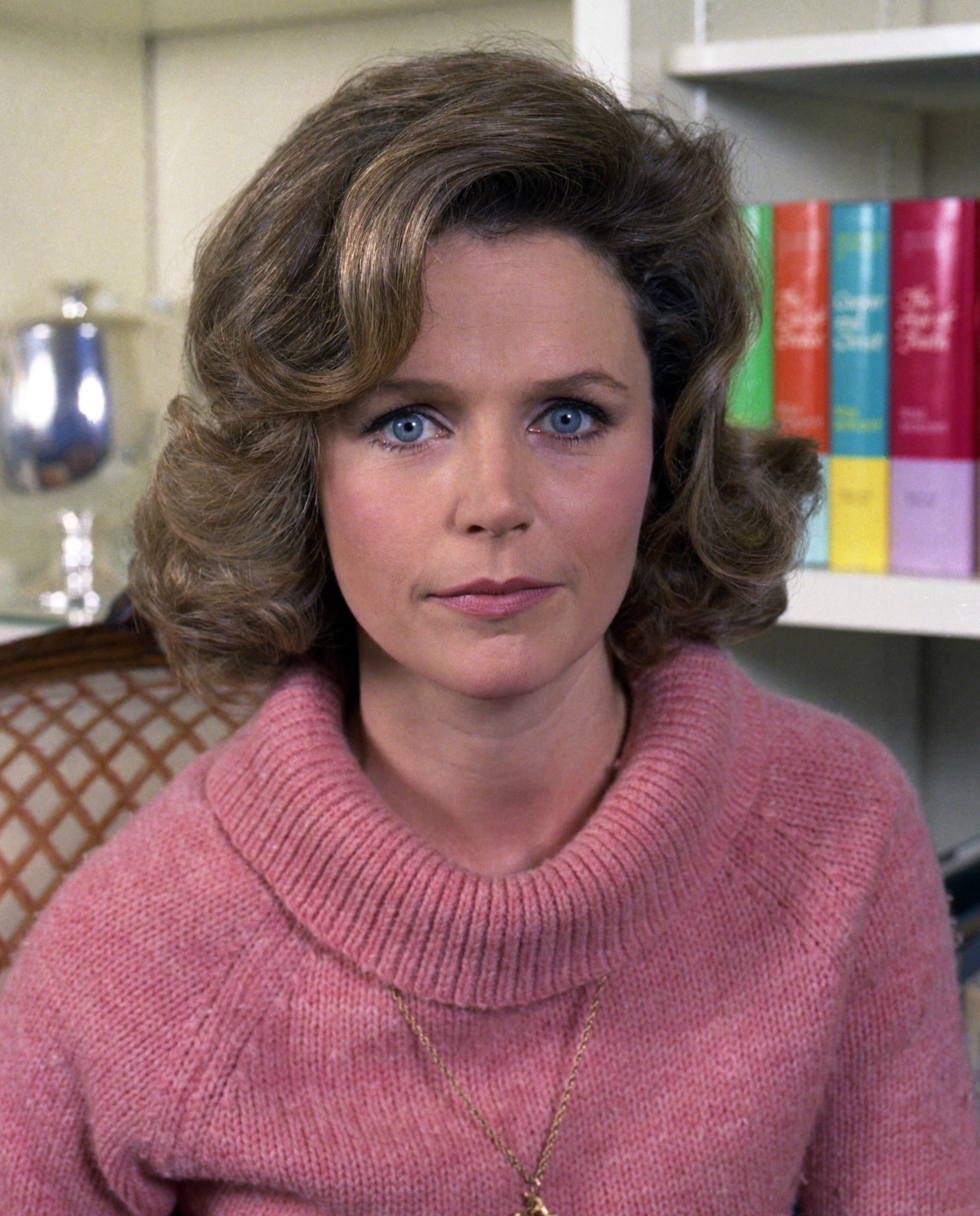
- Remick in 1974
- Born: Lee Ann Remick; December 14, 1935; Quincy, Massachusetts, U.S.
- Died: July 2, 1991 (aged 55); Brentwood, California, U.S.
- Education: Barnard College; Actors Studio
- Occupation: Actress
- Years active: 1953–1990
- Known for: Days of Wine and Roses; Wait Until Dark; The Omen
- Spouses: Bill Colleran (m. 1957; div. 1968) Kip Gowans (m. 1970)
- Children: 2
- Awards: Hollywood Walk of Fame

Lee Ann Remick (/ˈrɛmɪk/; December 14, 1935 – July 2, 1991) was an American actress. She was nominated for the Academy Award for Best Actress for the film Days of Wine and Roses (1962) and was nominated for the Tony Award for Best Actress in a Play for her role in Wait Until Dark (1966) in addition to earning seven Emmy Award nominations.

Remick made her film debut in A Face in the Crowd (1957). Some of her other notable film roles include Anatomy of a Murder (1959), Wild River (1960), Days of Wine and Roses (1962), No Way to Treat a Lady (1968), The Detective (1968), The Omen (1976), and The Europeans (1979).

Remick won a Golden Globe Award for Best Actress for the TV film The Blue Knight (1973), and for playing the title role in the miniseries Jennie: Lady Randolph Churchill (1974). For the latter role, she won the BAFTA TV Award for Best Actress. In April 1991, she received a star on the Hollywood Walk of Fame.

== Early life ==
Remick was born in Quincy, Massachusetts, the daughter of Gertrude Margaret (two sources say Patricia) (née Waldo), an actress, and Francis Edwin "Frank" Remick, who owned a department store. She had one older brother, Bruce. One of her maternal great-grandmothers, Eliza Duffield, was a preacher born in England.

Remick attended the Swoboda School of Dance and the Hewitt School.

== Career ==
=== Broadway and television ===
Remick made her Broadway theatre debut, age 18, in the 1953 production Be Your Age. She began guest-starring on episodes of TV anthology series such as Armstrong Circle Theatre, Studio One in Hollywood, Robert Montgomery Presents, Kraft Television Theatre, and Playhouse 90.

=== Early films ===
Remick made her film debut in Elia Kazan's A Face in the Crowd (1957). While filming the movie in Arkansas, Remick lived with a local family and practiced baton twirling, so that she would be believable as the teenager who wins the attention of Lonesome Rhodes (played by Andy Griffith).

After appearing as Eula Varner, the hot-blooded daughter-in-law of Will Varner (Orson Welles) in The Long, Hot Summer (1958), she appeared in These Thousand Hills (1959) as a dance-hall girl, both for 20th Century Fox.

=== Film stardom ===
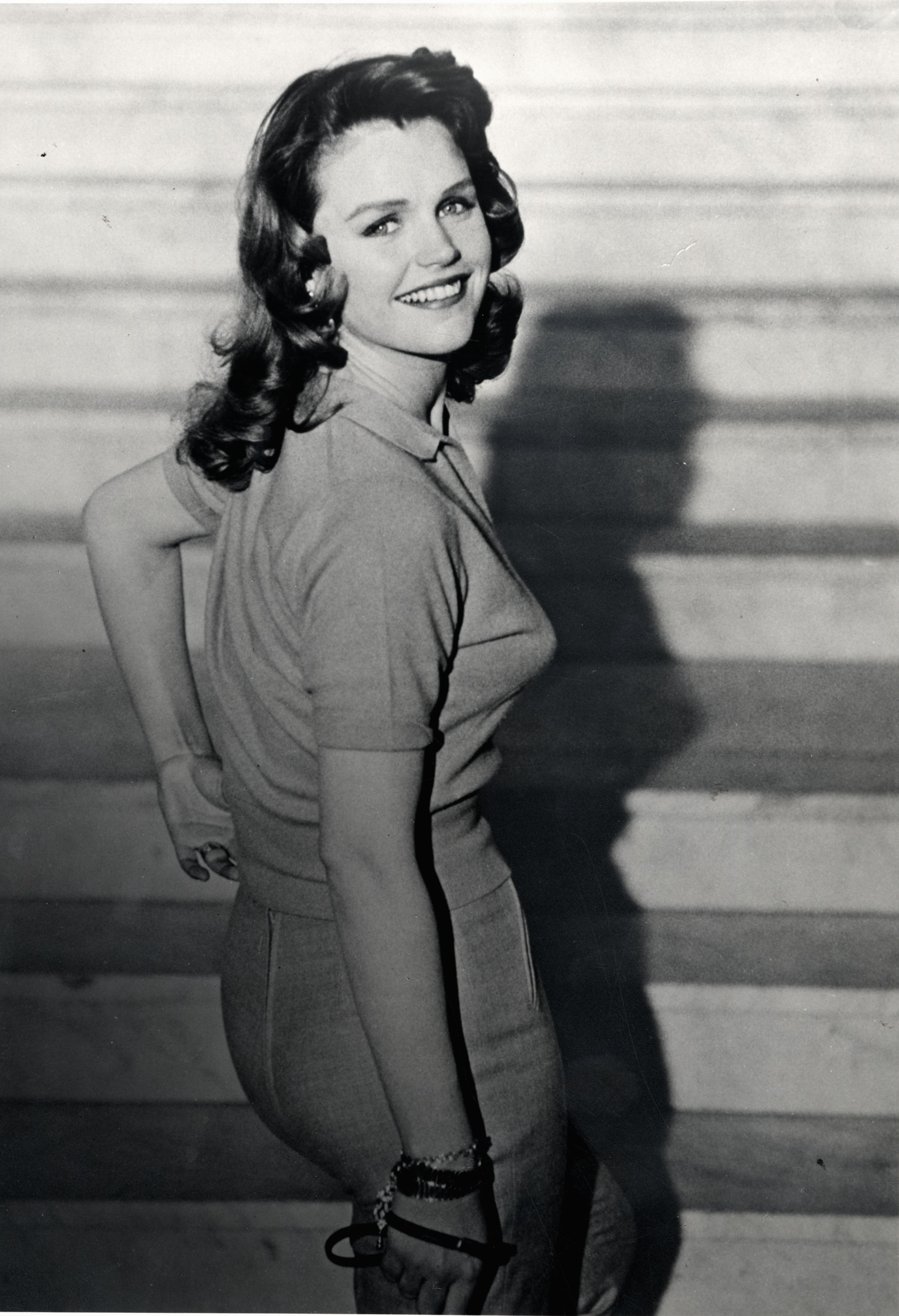
Remick in 1960

Remick came to prominence portraying a rape victim whose husband is tried for killing her attacker in Otto Preminger's Anatomy of a Murder (1959).

She made a second film with Kazan, Wild River (1960), which co-starred Montgomery Clift and Jo Van Fleet. That year she played Miranda in a television version of The Tempest with Richard Burton.

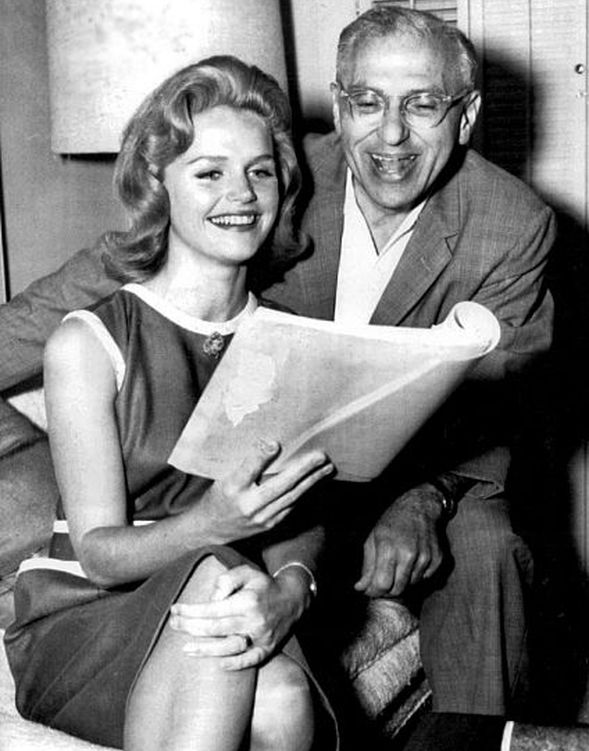
Rehearsing Something's Got to Give with director George Cukor in 1962

Remick was top-billed in Sanctuary (1961) alongside Yves Montand. She appeared in The Farmer's Daughter (1962) on television. She starred opposite Glenn Ford in the Blake Edwards suspense-thriller Experiment in Terror (1962). The same year, she was nominated for an Academy Award for Best Actress for her performance as the alcoholic wife of Jack Lemmon in Days of Wine and Roses (1962), also directed by Edwards. Bette Davis, also nominated that year for What Ever Happened to Baby Jane?, said "Miss Remick's performance astonished me, and I thought, if I lose the Oscar, it will be to her." They both lost to Anne Bancroft in The Miracle Worker.

When Marilyn Monroe was fired for absenteeism during the filming of the comedy Something's Got to Give, the studio announced that Remick would be her replacement. Co-star Dean Martin refused to continue. Remick did The Running Man (1963) with Laurence Harvey and The Wheeler Dealers (1963) with James Garner.

=== Return to Broadway and 1965 films ===
Remick next appeared in the 1964 Broadway musical Anyone Can Whistle, with music and lyrics by Stephen Sondheim and a book and direction by Arthur Laurents, which ran for only one week. Remick's performance is captured on the original cast recording. This began a friendship between Remick and Sondheim, and she later appeared in the 1985 concert version of his musical Follies.

Remick returned to films with Baby the Rain Must Fall (1965), with Steve McQueen from a script by Horton Foote, and The Hallelujah Trail (1965) with Burt Lancaster.

In 1966, she starred in the Broadway play Wait Until Dark under the direction of Arthur Penn and co-starring Robert Duvall. It was a big success and ran for 373 performances; Remick was nominated for a Tony award for Best Actress (Dramatic). It was adapted into a successful film the following year starring Audrey Hepburn.

=== More films and 1970s ===
She performed in Damn Yankees! (1967) for TV and starred in No Way to Treat a Lady (1968) with Rod Steiger and George Segal, The Detective (1968) with Frank Sinatra, and Hard Contract (1969) with James Coburn.

Remick went to the UK to make Loot (1970) and A Severed Head (1971). Back in the U.S., she was in Sometimes a Great Notion (1971).

She appeared in Hennessy (1975), with Rod Steiger. She co-starred with Gregory Peck in the 1976 horror film The Omen. The film was a commercial success.

Remick followed it up with leading actress roles in Telefon (1977), with Charles Bronson; The Medusa Touch (1978) with Richard Burton; the television miniseries Wheels (1979) with Rock Hudson; Ike: The War Years (1979) portraying Kay Summersby; and The Europeans (1979) for director James Ivory.

Remick starred in many TV movies, beginning with The Man Who Came to Dinner (1972) with Orson Welles. She followed it with Summer and Smoke (1972) for British TV, The Hunted a.k.a. Touch Me Not (1972), And No One Could Save Her (1973), Of Men and Women (1973) – an unsuccessful pilot, The Blue Knight (1973) with William Holden, A Delicate Balance (1973) with Katharine Hepburn, QB VII (1974), Jennie: Lady Randolph Churchill (1975) playing the title role that earned her an Emmy nomination, Hustling (1975) with Jill Clayburgh, A Girl Named Sooner (1975), Breaking Up (1978), and Torn Between Two Lovers (1979) with George Peppard.

=== 1980s ===
Remick played Margaret Sullavan in Haywire (1980) and earned an Emmy nomination (as Outstanding Lead Actress in a Limited Series or Special). She had the lead in The Women's Room (1980) and supporting roles in The Competition (1980) and Tribute (1980), the latter with Lemmon.

Remick starred in The Letter (1982), The Gift of Love: A Christmas Story (1983), and a TV adaptation of I Do! I Do! (1984). She had a role in the miniseries Mistral's Daughter (1984), adapted from the novel by Judith Krantz. The reviewer from The New York Times praised Remick for portraying Kate "to fresh-faced, clawing perfection".

Remick was in Rearview Mirror (1984), Toughlove (1985), Of Pure Blood (1986), and Nutcracker: Money, Madness and Murder (1987), earning another Emmy nomination (as Outstanding Lead Actress in a Miniseries or a Special). She went to Australia to make Emma's War (1987).

Remick's later performances include The Vision (1987) with Dirk Bogarde, Jesse (1988), Bridge to Silence (1989), and playing Sarah Bernhardt in Around the World in 80 Days (1989). Her last performance was the lead in the TV movie Dark Holiday (1989).

== Personal life ==
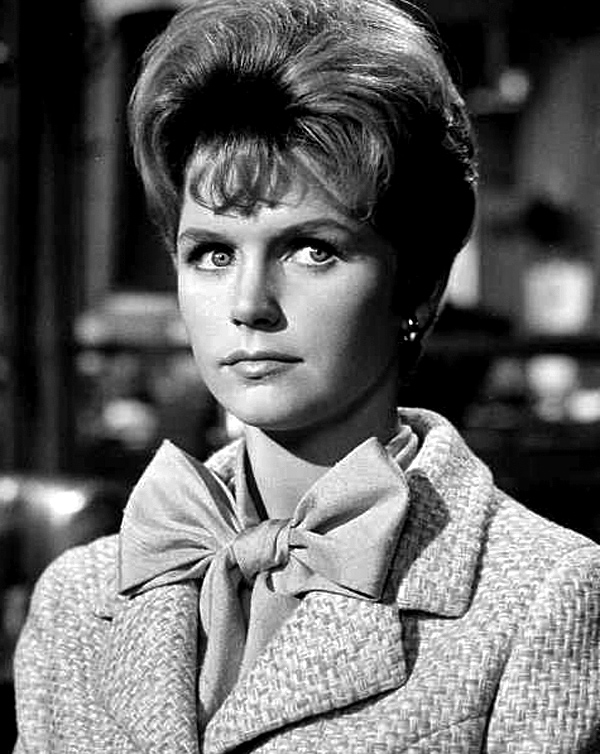
Remick in The Wheeler Dealers in 1963

Remick married producer Bill Colleran, whose credits include Your Hit Parade, The Dean Martin Show, and The Judy Garland Show, on August 3, 1957. They had two children, Katherine Lee Colleran (b. January 27, 1959) and Matthew Remick Colleran (b. June 7, 1961). Remick and Colleran divorced in 1968.

Remick married British producer William Rory "Kip" Gowans on December 18, 1970. He was an assistant director on films such as Darling (1965), Far from the Madding Crowd (1967), and The Lion in Winter (1968) before they married, and afterward worked on Sleuth (1972), The Man Who Fell to Earth (1976), and The Human Factor (1979). She moved with Gowans to England and remained married to him until her death. She starred in four telefilms he produced, The Women's Room (1980), The Letter (1982), Rearview Mirror (1984) and Of Pure Blood (1986). Remick and Gowans spent time in both England and Osterville, Massachusetts, which she considered her "true home".

== Death ==
In the spring of 1989, Remick was diagnosed with kidney cancer. Treatments at first seemed to be successful. Her condition eventually worsened, though, and she died on July 2, 1991, at the age of 55.

== Recognition and legacy ==
Remick was the subject of "Lee Remick", the 1978 debut single by the Australian indie rock band the Go-Betweens. Songwriter Robert Forster mistakenly thought Remick was from Ireland, and he made references to this idea in the song. In reality, Remick was American-born and raised (as were her parents); after 1970, she divided her time between England (where she had family ancestry) and the U.S.

The English indie rock band Hefner recorded a song titled "Lee Remick" in 1998, unrelated to the Go-Betweens' single.

== Filmography ==
=== Film ===
Remick (left) with Andy Griffith and Patricia Neal on the set of A Face in the Crowd (1957)

Year	Title	Role	Notes
1957	A Face in the Crowd	Betty Lou Fleckum	Film debut
1958	The Long, Hot Summer	Eula Varner	
1959	These Thousand Hills	Callie	
1959	Anatomy of a Murder	Laura Manion	
1960	Wild River	Carol Garth Baldwin	
1961	Sanctuary	Temple Drake	
1962	Experiment in Terror	Kelly Sherwood	
1962	Days of Wine and Roses	Kirsten Arnesen Clay	
1963	The Running Man	Stella Black	
1963	The Wheeler Dealers	Molly Thatcher	
1965	Baby the Rain Must Fall	Georgette Thomas	
1965	The Hallelujah Trail	Cora Templeton Massingale	
1965	The Satan Bug	Cocktail Waitress	Uncredited
1968	No Way to Treat a Lady	Kate Palmer	
1968	The Detective	Karen Leland	
1969	Hard Contract	Sheila Metcalfe	
1970	Loot	Nurse Fay McMahon	
1970	A Severed Head	Antonia Lynch-Gibbon	
1971	Sometimes a Great Notion	Viv Stamper	
1972	The Hunted	Elanor	
1973	A Delicate Balance	Julia	
1975	Hennessy	Kate Brooke	
1976	The Omen	Katherine Thorn	
1977	Telefon	Barbara	
1978	The Medusa Touch	Doctor Zonfeld	
1979	The Europeans	Baroness Eugenia Young Munster	
1980	The Competition	Greta Vandemann	
1980	Tribute	Maggie Stratton	
1988	Emma's War	Anne Grange	
2024	The First Omen	Katherine Thorn	Archival footage

=== Television ===
Year	Title	Role	Notes
1954	Studio One	Jessie Benson	Episode: "The Death and Life of Larry Benson"
1956	Studio One	Elaine Baylee	Episode: "The Landlady's Daughter"
1960	The Tempest	Miranda	TV movie
1962	The Farmer's Daughter	Katrin Holstrom	TV movie
1967	Damn Yankees!	Lola	TV movie
1972	The Man Who Came to Dinner	Maggie Cutler	TV movie
1972	BBC Play of the Month	Alma Winemiller	Episode: "Summer and Smoke"
1973	And No One Could Save Her	Fern O'Neil	TV movie
1973	The Blue Knight	Cassie Walters	TV movie
1974	QB VII	Lady Margaret	2 episodes
1974	Jennie: Lady Randolph Churchill	Lady Randolph Churchill	7 episodes
1975	Hustling	Fran Morrison	TV movie
1975	A Girl Named Sooner	Elizabeth McHenry	TV movie
1977	The Ambassadors	Maria Gostrey	TV movie
1978	Breaking Up	Joann Hammil	TV movie
1978	Wheels	Erica Trenton	TV movie
1979	Torn Between Two Lovers	Diana Conti	TV movie
1979	Ike: The War Years	Kay Summersby	3 episodes
1980	Haywire	Margaret Sullavan	TV movie
1980	The Women's Room	Mira Adams	TV movie
1982	I Do! I Do!	She	TV movie
1982	The Letter	Leslie Crosbie	TV movie
1983	The Gift of Love: A Christmas Story	Janet Broderick	TV movie
1984	Mistral's Daughter	Kate Browning	TV miniseries
1984	A Good Sport	Michelle Tenney	TV movie
1984	Rearview Mirror	Terry Seton	TV movie
1985	Toughlove	Jan Charters	TV movie
1985	Faerie Tale Theatre	The Snow Queen	Episode: "The Snow Queen"
1986	American Playhouse	Eleanor Roosevelt	Episode: "Eleanor: In Her Own Words"
1986	Of Pure Blood	Alicia Browning	TV movie
1987	Nutcracker: Money, Madness and Murder	Frances Schreuder	TV movie
1988	Jesse	Jesse Maloney	TV movie
1988	The Vision	Grace Gardner	TV movie
1989	Bridge to Silence	Marge Duffield	TV movie
1989	Around the World in 80 Days	Sarah Bernhardt	3 episodes
1989	Dark Holiday	Gene LePere	TV movie a.k.a. Passport to Terror

== Awards and nominations ==
Year	Organization	Category	Work	Result	Ref.
1960	Golden Globe Awards	Best Actress in a Motion Picture – Drama	Anatomy of a Murder	Nominated	
1963	Academy Awards	Best Actress	Days of Wine and Roses	Nominated	
1963	Golden Globe Awards	Best Actress in a Motion Picture – Drama	Days of Wine and Roses	Nominated	
1963	San Sebastián International Film Festival	Silver Shell for Best Actress	Days of Wine and Roses	Won	
1964	British Academy Film Awards	Best Actress in a Leading Role	Days of Wine and Roses	Nominated	
1966	Tony Awards	Tony Award for Best Actress in a Play	Wait Until Dark	Nominated	
1974	Golden Globe Awards	Best Actress – Television Series Drama	The Blue Knight	Won	
1974	Primetime Emmy Awards	Outstanding Lead Actress in a Limited Series	The Blue Knight	Nominated	
1975	British Academy Television Awards	Best Actress	Jennie: Lady Randolph Churchill	Won	
1975	Primetime Emmy Awards	Outstanding Single Performance By A Supporting Actress In A Comedy Or Drama Series	QB VII	Nominated	
1976	Golden Globe Awards	Best Actress – Television Series Drama	Jennie: Lady Randolph Churchill	Won	
1976	Primetime Emmy Awards	Outstanding Lead Actress in a Limited or Anthology Series or Movie	Jennie: Lady Randolph Churchill	Nominated	
1978	Primetime Emmy Awards	Outstanding Lead Actress in a Limited or Anthology Series or Movie	Wheels	Nominated	
1979	Golden Globe Awards	Best Actress – Television Series Drama	Wheels	Nominated	
1980	Primetime Emmy Awards	Outstanding Lead Actress in a Limited or Anthology Series or Movie	Haywire	Nominated	
1983	Golden Globe Awards	Best Actress – Miniseries or Television Film	The Letter	Nominated	
1987	Primetime Emmy Awards	Outstanding Lead Actress in a Miniseries or Special	Nutcracker: Money, Madness and Murder	Nominated	
1987	Primetime Emmy Awards	Outstanding Individual Achievement - Informational Programming - Performing	Eleanor: In Her Own Words	Nominated	
1990	Women in Film Honors	Crystal Award	—N/a	Honored	
1991	Hollywood Walk of Fame	Star - Motion Pictures	—N/a	Honored	
