= The Man Who Came to Dinner =

Comedy in three acts by George S. Kaufman and Moss Hart

- First edition (1939)
- Original language: English
- Written by: George S. Kaufman; Moss Hart
- Genre: Comedy

Premiere
- Date: October 16, 1939
- Place: Music Box Theatre; New York City

The Man Who Came to Dinner is a comedy play by George S. Kaufman and Moss Hart. It debuted on October 16, 1939, at the Music Box Theatre in New York City, where it ran until 1941, closing after 739 performances. It then enjoyed a number of New York and London revivals. The first London production was staged at The Savoy Theatre starring Robert Morley and Coral Browne.

== Synopsis ==
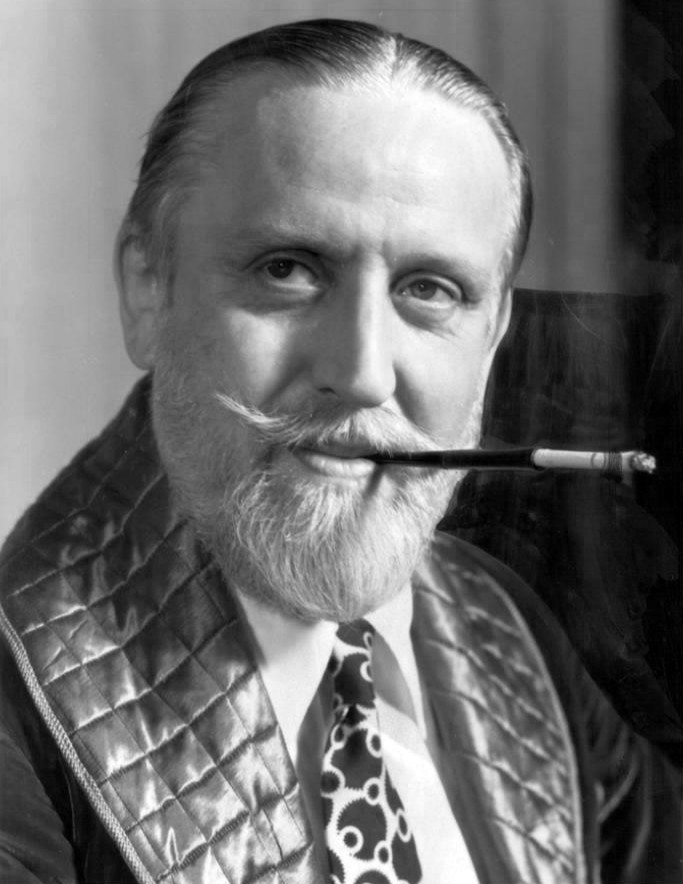
Monty Woolley created the role of Sheridan Whiteside in The Man Who Came to Dinner

The play is set in the small town of Mesalia, Ohio in the weeks leading to Christmas in the late 1930s. The famously outlandish New York City radio wit Sheridan Whiteside ('Sherry' to his friends) is invited to dine at the house of the well-to-do factory owner Ernest W. Stanley and his family. But before Whiteside can enter the house, he slips on a patch of ice outside the Stanleys' front door and injures his hip. Confined to the Stanleys' home, Whiteside is looked after by several professionals: Dr. Bradley, the absent-minded town physician, Miss Preen, his frantic nurse, and Maggie Cutler, his faithful secretary.

Confined to the house for a month, Whiteside drives his hosts mad by viciously insulting them, monopolizing their house and staff, running up large phone bills, and receiving many bizarre guests, including paroled convicts, and the eccentric Professor Metz, who brings him a glass-encased cockroach colony. Although he earns the intense dislike of Mr. Stanley, Whiteside manages to befriend his adult children, June and Richard, as well as his wildly eccentric older sister, Harriet Stanley.

He also befriends local newspaperman and aspiring playwright Bert Jefferson but soon learns that Maggie has fallen in love with Bert, and plans to leave her job to marry him. Unable to bear the thought of losing his secretary, Whiteside invites his friend, the glamorous and loose-living actress Lorraine Sheldon, to Mesalia to look at Bert's new play, hoping she can break up the marriage plans. Dr. Bradley tells Whiteside he was mistaken in his diagnosis, and Whiteside is well enough to leave. Whiteside buys the doctor's silence by pretending to want to work on a book with him, and for the rest of the play keeps brushing him off.

Whiteside encourages June Stanley to elope with a young union organizer whom her father disapproves of, and Richard to run away and pursue his dream of becoming a photographer. Lorraine arrives, and Maggie instantly suspects Whiteside's efforts to interfere with her and Bert. Whiteside and Maggie then receive a visit from their friend, noted British actor and playwright Beverly Carlton. Maggie learns Beverly can do a great impression of Lord Bottomley, an English lord whom Lorraine is desperate to marry. She gets Beverly to call Lorraine from the train station and pretend to be Lord Bottomley proposing, to get Lorraine to leave. However, Whiteside soon sees through the ruse and when Lorraine realizes Maggie's involvement, she starts to seduce Bert as revenge.

The next day, Christmas, Bert is enthralled with Lorraine, and Maggie, hurt by Whiteside's betrayal, tells him she is quitting. Feeling guilty, Sherry tries to think of a way to get Lorraine out of Mesalia. He gets help from an unexpected visit by his friend, movie comedian Banjo. Mr. Stanley, however, furious at Whiteside's interference with his family, has now ordered Sherry's eviction from the house and gives him fifteen minutes to leave. All looks hopeless until an Egyptian mummy case is delivered to Whiteside (a Christmas gift from the Khedive of Egypt). Whiteside and Banjo manage to trick Lorraine into the mummy case and shut her inside. Sherry then sees a photo of Harriet Stanley when she was younger, and recognizes her as a famous axe murderer. Using this information, he blackmails Mr. Stanley into helping them get the case onto Banjo's plane.

Whiteside now stands, telling Maggie she is free to marry Bert and prepares to return to New York by train. Unfortunately, as he is leaving the house, he slips on another patch of ice, injuring himself again. He is carried back inside the house screaming as the curtain falls.

== Influence of Alexander Woollcott ==
Kaufman and Hart wrote the play as a vehicle for their friend Alexander Woollcott, the model for the lead character Sheridan Whiteside. At the time the play was written, Woollcott was famous both as the theater critic who helped re-launch the career of the Marx Brothers and as the star of the national radio show The Town Crier. He was well liked by both Kaufman and Hart, but that did not stop him from displaying the obnoxious characteristics displayed by Whiteside in the play. Kaufman and Hart had promised a vehicle for Woollcott but had been unable to find a plot that suited them until one day Woollcott showed up, unannounced, at Hart's Bucks County estate, and proceeded to take over the house. He slept in the master bedroom, terrorized Hart's staff, and generally acted like Sheridan Whiteside. On his way out he wrote in Hart's guest book, "This is to certify that I had one of the most unpleasant times I ever spent." Hart related the story to Kaufman soon afterwards. As they were both laughing about it, Hart remarked that he was lucky that Woollcott had not broken his leg and become stuck there. Kaufman looked at Hart and the idea was born.

A plot point mentions actress and Broadway producer Katharine Cornell. The character Bert Jefferson writes a play, and Whiteside promises to give it to Cornell for her to star in. The character of Professor Metz is after Gustav Eckstein, MD, a physician writer from Cincinnati who studied animal behavior and was a long-time friend of Alexander Woollcott.

Woollcott was delighted with The Man Who Came to Dinner and was offered the role for its Broadway debut. With his busy schedule of radio broadcasts and lectures, he declined, and Monty Woolley played the part on stage and in the subsequent film adaptation. Woollcott did subsequently play Whiteside in a West Coast touring production of the play.

The printed edition of the play starts with the inscription "To Alexander Woollcott, for reasons that are nobody's business."

== Casts ==
	Original Broadway (1939)	Broadway Revival (1980)	Second Broadway Revival (2000)
Sheridan Whiteside	Monty Woolley	Ellis Rabb	Nathan Lane
Maggie Cutler	Edith Atwater	Maureen Anderman	Harriet Harris
Bert Jefferson	Theodore Newton	Peter Coffield	Hank Stratton
Lorraine Sheldon	Carol Goodner	Carrie Nye	Jean Smart
Beverly Carlton	John Hoysradt	Roderick Cook	Byron Jennings
Banjo	David Burns	Leonard Frey	Lewis J. Stadlen
Mr. Stanley	George Lessey	Richard Woods	Terry Beaver
Mrs. Stanley	Virginia Hammond	Patricia O'Connell	Linda Stephens
Richard Stanley	Gordon Merrick	Josh Clark	Zach Shaffer
June Stanley	Barbara Woodell	Amanda Carlin	Mary Catherine Garrison
Miss Preen	Mary Wickes	Anita Dangler	Mary Catherine Wright
Dr. Bradley	Dudley Clements	Robert Nichols	William Duell
Harriet Stanley	Ruth Vivian	Kate Wilkinson	Ruby Holbrook
John	George Probert	Bill McCutcheon	Jeff Hayenga
Sarah	Priestley Morrison	Yolanda Childress	Julie Boyd
Professor Metz	LeRoi Operti	Nicholas Martin	Stephen DeRosa
Sandy	Michael Harvey	Jamey Sheridan	Ryan Shively
Mrs. McCutcheon	Edmonia Nolley	Dorothy Stinnette	Julie Halston
Mrs. Dexter	Barbara Adams	N/A	Kit Flanagan
Mr. Baker	Carl Johnson	Robert O'Rourke	Hans Hoffman
Mr. Westcott	Edward Fisher	Nicholas Martin	Ian Blackman
Plainclothes Man	William Postance	Charles Hardin	Ian Blackman

Character notes

- Sheridan Whiteside was modeled on Alexander Woollcott.
- Beverly Carlton was modeled on Noël Coward.
- Banjo was modeled on Harpo Marx, and there is a dialogue reference to his brothers Groucho and Chico. When Sheridan Whiteside talks to Banjo on the phone, he asks him, "How are Wackko and Sloppo?" Marx played the character himself in a 1941 production at Bucks County Playhouse, alongside George S. Kaufman as Whiteside and Moss Hart as Beverly Carlton. Stadlen's turn at Banjo came 30 years after he made his Broadway debut portraying Groucho in the musical comedy Minnie's Boys.
- Professor Metz was based on Dr. Gustav Eckstein of Cincinnati (with cockroaches substituted for canaries)
- Lorraine Sheldon was modeled after Gertrude Lawrence.
- The character of Harriet Sedley, the alias of Harriet Stanley, is an homage to Lizzie Borden. The popular jump-rope rhyme immortalizing Borden is parodied in the play.

== Adaptations ==
=== Film ===
The production was adapted for a 1942 feature film, scripted by Philip G. Epstein and Julius J. Epstein and directed by William Keighley. The film featured Monty Woolley, Bette Davis, Ann Sheridan, Billie Burke, Jimmy Durante, Mary Wickes and Richard Travis. It had its world premiere at the Capitol Theater in Paragould, Arkansas.

=== Radio ===
The Man Who Came to Dinner was presented on Philip Morris Playhouse July 10, 1942. Monty Woolley starred in the adaptation. It was broadcast again by Theatre Guild on the Air on ABC Radio November 17, 1946 starring Fred Allen. In 1949, The Man Who Came to Dinner was produced for CBS Radio for The Hotpoint Holiday Hour. The production starred Charles Boyer, Jack Benny, Gene Kelly, Gregory Peck, Dorothy McGuire, and Rosalind Russell. It was also adapted for the Lux Radio Theater on March 27, 1950, starring Clifton Webb as Sheridan Whiteside and Lucille Ball as Maggie Cutler. The show was hosted by William Keighley, who directed the 1942 film adaptation.

For Christmas Day, 2000, BBC Radio 4 broadcast a Marcy Kahan adaptation of The Man Who Came to Dinner approved by the Hart and Kaufman estates which starred Simon Callow as Whiteside, Elizabeth McGovern as Maggie, with Conleth Hill as Bert Jefferson, Cheryl Campbell as Lorraine Sheldon, John Sessions as Banjo and Professor Metz, Colin Stinton as Mr. Stanley, and Malcolm Sinclair as Beverly Carlton. Moira Petty, writing in The Stage, said, "Director Ned Chaillet elicited from his cast ... a smart, gag-telling pace, which gave it a sensational period flavour."

=== Musical ===
The play and subsequent film served as the basis for the 1967 musical Sherry!, with a book and lyrics by James Lipton and music by Laurence Rosenthal. Clive Revill starred as Sheridan Whiteside. The show ran on Broadway for 72 performances. Years later, the musical was recorded with a studio cast led by Nathan Lane as Sheridan.

=== Television ===
- An adaptation was broadcast on the January 16, 1949 as part of the Anthology series The Ford Television Theatre.
- On October 13, 1954, a 60-minute adaptation was aired on the CBS Television series The Best of Broadway.
- A Hallmark Hall of Fame production, adapted by Sam Denoff and Bill Persky and directed by Buzz Kulik, was broadcast by NBC on November 29, 1972. The production starred Orson Welles, who was "a marvelous friend" of Woollcott's and had been offered the role of Sheridan Whiteside in both the original stage production and the 1942 film. Welles later said he was "very smart [to have declined]; because if you've seen the film you'll know it was awful and there was no way for anybody to be good in it." Welles's costars were Lee Remick (Maggie Cutler), Joan Collins (Lorraine Sheldon), Don Knotts (Dr. Bradley), and Marty Feldman (Banjo). The New York Times criticized Denoff's updating of the original play (Welles's Whiteside was a television personality competing with Johnny Carson) and listed the production in its 1972 "Worst of Television" list.
- The 2000 Broadway revival was broadcast by the PBS series Stage on Screen on October 7, 2000, three days after the New York production closed, and was released on DVD.

== Broadway revivals ==
A 1980 revival directed by Stephen Porter ran for 19 previews and 85 performances at the Circle in the Square Theatre. The cast included Ellis Rabb, Roderick Cook, Leonard Frey, Carrie Nye, and Jamey Sheridan. Drama Desk Award nominations went to Cook for Outstanding Featured Actor in a Play and Nye for Outstanding Featured Actress in a Play.

A 2000 revival, which ran for 85 performances, was produced by the Roundabout Theatre Company and directed by Jerry Zaks. The cast included Nathan Lane (Sheridan Whiteside), Jean Smart (Lorraine Sheldon), Harriet Sansom Harris (Maggie Cutler), and Lewis J. Stadlen (Banjo). In an interview prior to the opening, Lane said, "There's a danger in playing Whiteside. In the movie, Monty Woolley's portrayal at times came across as mean for mean's sake. It's when it gets nasty or bitchy that it goes off in the wrong direction." He suggested that his performance was influenced by Woollcott's repressed sexuality, stating, "He had a lot of...things he didn't want to deal with." The production received mixed reviews. Variety, The Advocate and Talkin' Broadway reviewed it positively, and Entertainment Weekly gave the production a B+, calling it "as fresh a send-up as an SNL sketch and [with] an even more inspired plot" and singling out Smart's "swanning demonstration of ultimate showbiz phoniness" for praise. In The New York Times, however, Ben Brantley disliked the production, writing that "What should be a buoyant balloon of an evening [is] more often an exercise in deflation." Brantley praised Stadlen but found most of the acting to be "a series of flourishes that sell individual jokes and epigrams without being anchored to character."

Smart was nominated for the Tony Award for Best Actress in a Play and Stadlen was nominated for the Drama Desk Award for Outstanding Featured Actor in a Play, though neither won. The production was filmed and televised by Great Performances on PBS.

== In popular culture ==
Alternative rock singer Morrissey quoted the play's "All those people, all those lives, where are they now" monologue in The Smiths' 1986 song "Cemetry Gates", and used the pseudonym "Sheridan Whiteside" when writing record reviews before his musical career began. It is mentioned in an episode of The West Wing season 2
