= Rearview Mirror (film) =

1984 film directed by Lou Antonio

- Based on: Rearview Mirror by Caroline B. Cooney
- Written by: Lorenzo Semple Jr.
- Directed by: Lou Antonio
- Starring: Lee Remick; Tony Musante; Michael Beck
- Country of origin: United States
- Original language: English

Original release
- Release: 1984

Rearview Mirror is a 1984 American TV movie directed by Lou Antonio. The script was by Lorenzo Semple Jr. based on a novel by Caroline B. Cooney which had been published in 1980.

== Premise ==
Jerry Sam Hopps, an escaped convict and psychopathic murderer and his cousin terrorize a woman, Terry Seton, and force her to drive them through North Carolina, with a separately kidnapped baby. A visiting police detective pursues.

== Cast ==
- Lee Remick as Terry Seton
- Tony Musante as Vince Martino
- Michael Beck as Jerry Sam Hopps
- Jim Antonio as Chief Yates
- Don Galloway as Roger Seton
- Ned Bridges as Powell

== Production ==
The film was made in October 1984.

== Reception ==
The New York Times said "one begins to wonder early on, did a bunch of nice actors get caught in a kinky and pointless exercise like this?"

The Chicago Tribune called it "scary but goofy."

The Washington Post called it "a strikingly well-done nail biter."
