= Watch the Skies =

"Watch the Skies" is a phrase derived from a line of dialogue in the 1951 science fiction film The Thing from Another World.

It also refers to:

- Watch the Skies, a 2009 novel by James Patterson
- Xtro 3: Watch the Skies, a 1995 film
- UFO Sweden, a 2022 film known as Watch the Skies in the US and the UK
- Watch the Skies!, a 1994 book by Curtis Peebles
- "Watch the Skies", a song from the soundtrack to The Elder Scrolls V: Skyrim
- "Watch the Skies", a 1985 episode of St. Elsewhere
