= The Man Who Came to Dinner (1972 film) =

American television movie

- Based on: The Man Who Came to Dinner; 1939 play by George S. Kaufman and Moss Hart
- Screenplay by: Sam Denoff; Bill Persky
- Directed by: Buzz Kulik
- Starring: Orson Welles; Lee Remick; Joan Collins
- Music by: Roy Budd
- Country of origin: United States
- Original language: English

Production
- Producer: Sam Denoff
- Running time: 73 minutes
- Production companies: Foote, Cone and Belding Productions

Original release
- Network: NBC
- Release: November 29, 1972

The Man Who Came to Dinner is a 1972 American TV adaptation of the 1939 play The Man Who Came to Dinner by George S. Kaufman and Moss Hart. It was directed by Buzz Kulik for Hallmark Hall of Fame. The film was broadcast on November 29, 1972.

== Plot summary ==
Sheridan Whiteside, a sharp-tongued and famous radio critic, is on a lecture tour in Ohio when he slips on the icy steps of the home of the prominent Stanley family and breaks his hip. Forced to convalesce in their home during the Christmas holidays, Whiteside takes over the household, turning the Stanley home into a whirlwind of chaos.

The already dramatic situation is further complicated by a series of events: Whiteside’s secretary, Maggie Cutler, falls in love with a local newspaper reporter named Bert Jefferson. To keep Maggie from leaving his employ, Whiteside schemes to have his actress friend, Lorraine Sheldon, come and lure Bert away from Maggie. Additionally, Whiteside has to deal with a variety of eccentric characters who visit him during his convalescence, including the strange Professor Metz and the eccentric actor Beverly Carlton.

As Whiteside continues his manipulations and the Stanley home becomes more chaotic with penguins in the library and octopuses in the cellar, it’s revealed that he has been well enough to leave for some time but has stayed for his own amusement and purposes. However, his ruses are eventually revealed, leading to a series of comedic confrontations and resolutions.

In the end, Whiteside leaves the Stanley household, but not before causing a final bit of mischief. As he’s departing, he slips on the icy steps again, implying that the entire comedic cycle might begin anew.

== Cast ==
- Orson Welles as Sheridan Whiteside
- Lee Remick as Maggie Cutler
- Joan Collins as Lorraine Sheldon
- Don Knotts as Dr. Bradley
- Edward Andrews as Ernest W. Stanley
- Kim Braden as June Stanley
- Marty Feldman as Banjo
- Michael Gough as Beverly Carlton
- Peter Haskell as Bert Jefferson
- Tutte Lemkow as Zoltan
- Al Mancini as Westcott
- Marcella Markham as Mrs. Stanley
- George Pravda as Professor Metz
- Anita Sharp-Bolster as Harriet Stanley
- Elisabeth Welch as Sarah
- Mary Wickes as Nurse Preen

Wickes recreated the role she originated on Broadway in 1939 and which she played in the 1942 film version.

== Production ==
Orson Welles had been offered the role of Sheridan Whiteside on Broadway but turned it down because of the time commitment although he always loved the play. Welles later said that declining the stage production was smart "because if you've seen the film you'll know it was awful and there was no way for anybody to be good in it." The play was adapted and updated for the modern day by Sam Denoff and Bill Persky, who turned Whiteside into a TV talk show host.

The story is based in Ohio but was videotaped in Southampton, England to accommodate Welles who did not want to return to the U.S. due to tax difficulties.

== Reception ==
The Los Angeles Times called it "a splendid romp". Variety singled out the performances by Collins, Andrews, Wickes, Gough, Braden, and Knotts, while saying "None of the others in the extensive cast was less than good."
