= Montagu Porch =

British colonial officer (1877–1964)

- Porch, during his later life
- Born: Montagu Phippen Porch; 15 March 1877; Glastonbury, Somerset, England
- Died: 8 November 1964 (aged 87); Glastonbury, Somerset, England
- Education: Magdalen College, Oxford
- Occupations: Soldier, archeologist and colonial officer
- Spouses: Lady Randolph Churchill (m. 1918; died 1921); Giulia Patrizi (m. 1926; died 1938)
- Relatives: Winston Churchill (stepson)

Montagu Phippen Porch (15 March 1877 – 8 November 1964) was a British colonial officer who in 1918 became Winston Churchill's stepfather, although he was three years his junior.

== Early life ==
Porch was born on 15 March 1877 in Glastonbury, Somerset, the younger son of Reginald Porch (1838-1886) LL.M., of the Bengal Civil Service, and grandson of Thomas Porch Porch, JP, of Edgarley, just outside Glastonbury. His mother was Ann Rebecca (1847-1932), a daughter of James Austin, JP, of The Abbey, Glastonbury. On 8 June 1886, his father died at Puri in British India, leaving an estate valued at £5,212.

Porch was educated at Magdalen College, Oxford, and while there in 1900 he joined the Imperial Yeomanry which was a Cavalry regiment of the British Army, seeing active service as a trooper in the South African War. Returning to Oxford after the war, he graduated BA in 1902 and MA in 1904.

== Career ==
In 1906, he gained a place as an officer of the Colonial Service in Nigeria (was Assistant Resident in Zaria in 1910) and served in it until 1919, with most of his time spent in Africa. After his marriage in 1918, Porch resigned from the colonial service.

After his wife's death in 1921, Porch returned to West Africa, where he had some successful investments.

== Personal life ==
On 1 June 1918 Porch married Lady Randolph Churchill, the mother of Winston Churchill. There was a substantial age difference, as Porch was 41 and Lady Randolph (Jennie Jerome) was 64. This was Jennie's third marriage, Porch's first. In her final years, Jennie Porch ran up large debts, as her spending was far higher than the regular cheques for £60 Porch was sending her. The couple remained married for three years, until Jennie's death in 1921. After her death, her sister Leonie Leslie commented that "It is Winston who weeps copiously, but it is Jack, his brother, and poor Porchy who are paying off her debts."

A Roman Catholic, in 1926 Porch remarried to Donna Giulia Patrizi, the only daughter of the Marchese Patrizi della Rocco, and lived in Italy until she died in 1938. He then returned to Glastonbury where he died in November 1964, aged 87. Until the end, he avoided all discussion of his life with his first wife.
