= Gai-Jin =

1993 historical novel by James Clavell

- First edition cover
- Author: James Clavell
- Language: English
- Series: Asian Saga
- Genre: Historical fiction, Novel
- Publisher: Delacorte Press
- Publication date: June 1993
- Publication place: United Kingdom, United States
- Media type: Print (hardback & paperback)
- Pages: 1126 (paperback)
- ISBN: 0-385-31016-1 (first edition, hardback)
- OCLC: 27143901
- Dewey Decimal: 813/.54 20
- LC Class: PS3553.L365 G34 1993
- Preceded by: Tai-Pan (in chronology of Asian Saga)
- Followed by: King Rat

Gai-Jin (外人) (Japanese term for "foreigner" ) is a 1993 novel by James Clavell, chronologically the third book in his Asian Saga, although it was the last to be published. Taking place about 20 years after the events of Tai-Pan, it chronicles the adventures of Malcolm Struan, the son of Culum and Tess Struan, in Japan. The story delves deeply into the political situation in Japan and the hostility Westerners faced there, and is loosely based on the Namamugi Incident and the subsequent Anglo-Satsuma War.

== Plot summary ==
The story opens with a fictional rendition of the Namamugi Incident. On September 14, 1862, Phillip Tyrer, John Canterbury, Angelique Richaud, and Malcolm Struan are riding on the Tōkaidō, when they are attacked by Shorin Anato and Ori Ryoma, both Satsuma samurai and rōnin shishi in the sonnō jōi movement, cells of revolutionary xenophobic idealists. Canterbury is killed, Malcolm seriously wounded, and Tyrer receives a minor arm injury; only Angelique escapes back to Yokohama unharmed to get help. Tyrer and Malcolm make their way to Kanagawa (Kanagawa-ku) later that day, where Dr. Babcott operates on Malcolm. Meanwhile, at a village inn in Hodogaya the daimyō Sanjiro of Satsuma, meets with Katsumata, one of his advisors, and receives Ori and Shorin, with whom he plots an overthrow of the current Shogunate. Two days later Malcolm is moved to the merchants' settlement in Yokohama. He is not expected to last long and while he is in bed sick, he shows his emotions for Angelique, a voluptuous but penniless French girl.

The novel spins two story lines which intertwine with ever increasing complexity: one follows the "gaijin" (foreign) community in Yokohama, the other, the Japanese, both the government (Bakufu) run by a Council of Elders who advise the young Shōgun, and the anti-government, xenophobic, pro-Emperor forces, focusing on the "shishi". The Japanese distrust the foreigners only slightly more than they distrust each other. The various nationalities that make up the foreign community likewise plot against and socialise with each other warily. Both Japanese and foreigners are convinced of their own superiority.

While Malcolm slowly recovers from his wounds and falls in love with Angelique, she is raped by one of the Japanese samurai assassins, Ori Ryoma, as she lies sedated to treat her shock. Horrified, she keeps this a secret but later discovers she is pregnant. Desperate, she obtains Chinese medicine that precipitates an abortion, with the help of a French spy who later blackmails her with this knowledge. At the same time, she learns her father is a degenerate gambler in jail for debt, and her uncle loses her capital in a failed investment. Marriage to the infatuated Malcolm seems increasingly attractive but she must keep her rape an absolute secret. Obsessed with her, Ori rapes her again. This time, Angelique is not drugged, but she yields and tricks Ori into leaving afterwards instead of killing her, as she knew he intended. He is shot outside her window but no-one suspects he was leaving; it is rumored that he was trying to break in.

Yoshi Toranaga, a descendant of Lord Toranaga in Shogun and one of the Council of Elders, narrowly escapes various assassination attempts while he tries to out manoeuvre his fellow councilors, all of whom mistrust each other, as well as hunt down the rogue shishi. He hates the foreigners as passionately as the shishi do, but recognizes that their superior military technology makes sonnō jōi impossible for the present. This position puts him at odds with almost everyone around him. A meeting is arranged between the council and the representatives of the foreign community to deal with their demands for reparations and justice for the murderous attack, only one of several such incidents. Despite much Japanese prevarication, and the three-way interpreting necessary (English–Dutch–Japanese), a deal is struck.

Malcolm Struan is heir to the Noble House of Struan's, but he is not yet of age and therefore technically not tai-pan. Meanwhile, his mother, Tess Struan, runs the business and urges him to return to Hong Kong and give up his infatuation with this unsuitable penniless French "gold-digger". Her imperious attitude angers him and he resists, determined to marry Angelique and be taipan.

The brothels of Yokohama are where Japanese and foreigners meet. The French spy is besotted with a Japanese prostitute, whose Madame is associated with the "shishi" and who exchanges favours for information. The French spy introduces Tyrer to the delights and protocols of Japanese brothels. Later, Tyrer befriends a young Japanese and they begin to teach each other, although, unbeknownst to Tyrer, the Japanese is a fanatical "shishi". He gradually adopts the same position as Lord Yoshi, his implacable enemy: the only way to purge Japan of these revolting barbarians is to learn their military and technological secrets.

Malcolm marries Angelique irregularly on board ship, but dies on their wedding night when his wound hemorrhages. His mother is now officially tai-pan. Angelique is at first hysterical and nearly goes mad. When she recovers, she find she has gained wisdom and an icy calm and lost all fear. She plans to outwit Tess Struan, with the help of Edward Gornt, who hopes to marry her and also obtain revenge on Tess' family.

Tyrer discovers his "friend" is a dangerous assassin wanted by Lord Yoshi and must be handed over as part of a deal, but the shishi disappears. He hides out with his "sensei" and others in the brothel district. As the government samurai close their net, the sensei decides on a suicide mission: to set fire to the Yokohama settlement and sink the largest foreign ship in the harbour. Tyrer's friend is horrified but cannot disobey. The firebombs go off, the shishi saves Tyrer's life while the French spy dies in the flames. Though the brothel district and native village are destroyed, the foreign settlement and military camp are relatively undamaged, so the foreigners do not leave, thus subverting the purpose of the arson. To escape certain death and also to further his study of the source of foreign power, the shishi gets himself shipped off to England with Tyrer's help.

The story closes with a brief narration of the bombardment of Kagoshima and its aftermath.

== Historical basis ==
As with Clavell's other novels, the setting and many characters are based on actual events, which set the stage for the novel.

=== Gai-jin characters and firms ===
Struan and Company (the "Noble House" trading company of the novel) is based on Jardine Matheson Holdings, a massive Scottish trading company that continues to this day as an Asia-based trading company.

- Malcolm Struan: loosely based on the real-life Jardine taipan William Keswick.
- Jamie McFay: based on Thomas Blake Glover.
- Edward Gornt: loosely based on John Samuel Swire, founder of John Swire & Sons Limited and Swire Pacific.
- Angelique Richaud: based on Amelia Dubeux, who was married to William Keswick.
- Sir William Aylesbury: based upon Edward St. John Neale
- Phillip Tyrer: loosely based upon Ernest Mason Satow
- George Babcott: Dr. William Willis (1837–1894)
- John Canterbury – based on the real-life Charles Lennox Richardson, murdered by Satsuma samurai

=== Japanese characters ===
- Lord Toranaga Yoshi, Guardian of the Heir: Tokugawa Yoshinobu (1837–1913)
- Lady Hisako (Hosaki), his wife: Ichijō Mikako (1835–1894)
- Misamoto, his interpreter: loosely based on Nakahama Manjirō (1827–1898)
- Shōgun Toranaga Nobusada: Tokugawa Iemochi (1846–1866)
- The Emperor: Emperor Kōmei (1831–1867)
- Lady Yazu: Chikako, Princess Kazu (1846–1877)
- Lord Anjo: Andō Nobumasa (1820–1871)
- Lord Sanjiro of Satsuma: Shimazu Hisamitsu (1817–1887)
- Lord Ogama of Choshu: Mōri Takachika (1819–1871)
- Rezan Hiraga, alias Ukiya, Nakama and Otami: Itō Hirobumi (1841–1909)
- Akimoto: Inoue Kaoru (1836–1915)
- Katsumata: anachronistically based on Yoshida Shōin, though the real-life Yoshida had been executed in 1859, three years prior to the events depicted.

== Principal characters ==
- Malcolm Struan – grandson of Dirk Struan, eldest son of Culum Struan and heir and soon to be tai-pan of the Noble House
- Jamie McFay – manager of Struan's in Japan
- Dr. Ronald Hoag – Struan family physician
- Sir William Aylesbury, KCB – British Chief Minister to the Japans, head of legation
- Dr. George Babcott – British Deputy Minister and surgeon
- Phillip Tyrer – diplomat and apprentice Japanese interpreter
- Norbert Greyforth – head of Brock and Sons in Japan
- Lieutenant John Marlowe – captain of HMS Pearl, aide-de-camp to Admiral Ketterer
- Edward Gornt – gentleman Shanghai trader from Virginia, illegitimate son of Morgan Brock through Kristian Gornt. It is through Gornt that Brock's descendants continued to flourish in Asia. His great-grandson Quillan Gornt was a major character in Noble House.
- Henri Bonaparte Seratard – French Minister
- André Édouard Poncin, French spy, ostensibly a trader
- Count Alexi Zergeyev – Russian Minister
- Angelique Richaud – beloved of Malcolm Struan, ward of the French Minister
- Lord Toranaga Yoshi – the Guardian of the Heir
- Misamoto – Lord Yoshi's interpreter
- Hiraga – also known as Ukiya, Nakama and Otami, leader of the Choshu shishi
- Shōgun Nobusada Toranaga – heir to the title of Shōgun and to the Toranaga family; also mentioned in Noble House and Whirlwind
- Lady Yazu, wife of Nobusada, stepsister of Emperor Komei
- Lord Nori Anjo – daimyō of Kii and Mikawa, head of the Council of Elders
- Lord Sanjiro – daimyō of Satsuma
- Katsumata – advisor of Sanjiro and secret head of the shishi
- Lord Ogama – daimyō of Choshu
- Raiko – mama-san of Yokohama's House of the Three Carp
- Ori Ryoma – shishi, leader of a Satsuma cell, obsessed with Angelique
- Sumomo – shishi, Hiraga's fiancée

== Secondary characters ==
- Culum Struan – son of Dirk Struan, second tai-pan, father of Malcolm
- Tess (Hag) Struan – de facto tai-pan of the Noble House
- Gordon Chen – Compradore of the Noble House, illegitimate son of Dirk Struan
- Admiral Charles Ketterer – commander of the British fleet
- Captain Settry Pallidar – captain of the Dragoons
- Dmitri Syborodin – American trader of Cossack descent
- Heatherly Skye – the only solicitor in Japan
- John Canterbury – a British trader; killed by samurai while guiding new arrivals on a routine tour of the Tōkaidō road.
- Sir Morgan Brock
- General Thomas Ogilvy
- Isiah Adamson – American Minister
- von Heimrich – Prussian Minister

== Background ==
James Clavell announced in 1981 he wanted to write a novel called Nippon which dealt with descendants of the characters from Shogun in the era of Perry. However he got distracted writing Whirlwind instead and did not get around to his Japanese story until years later.

Clavell later reflected on this period in history:

Because of the opening, the Japanese saw very quickly that they needed to be on equal terms with the Westerners. The Westerners forced their way ashore with their ships and their cannons and their rifles. Very logically, the Japanese said, 'How does a little island nation like Britain, which is smaller than Japan, rule the world?' A stupid Englishman explained to them, 'Well, you do it with big navies and cannons.' So the Japanese said, 'Domo.' And they got together and asked, 'How the hell are we going to get big ships, bigger than them, and cannons?' What are the Japanese doing now? It's all in 'Gai-Jin.' They're doing economically what they could not do militarily. . . . And there's the Japanese tradition that the student has the duty to surpass his teacher. But nobody explains that to anybody. So I think if I were Japanese, I would be very teed off to have this Japan-bashing when they're only doing what they were told to do. On the American side, I say, 'Hey, let's talk about rice, reciprocity, trade imbalance.' Nobody understands nobody. I'm hoping that 'Gai-Jin' and 'Shogun' and the other books explain.

Clavell says he was "surprised" that the protagonist of the novel turned out to be Malcolm Struan's wife Angelique instead of Malcolm. "But you never know how these things are going to turn out. For example, I was expecting Mrs Struan... to arrive from Hong Kong on every damned boat, but she never appeared. That's the way it happened."

Clavell says the death of Malcolm in the book was not planned. "That death frightened me to death", he said. "The number of people who ring me up saying 'You killed him!'. I say I didn't kill him, so-and-so killed him."

Clavell said that he did not plot his books. "I write it pretty much as you read it. Of course I may have to go back and change something because of what I have written later, but usually it just runs through. I always have trouble deciding when to stop. I didn't know how this was going to end until I got there."

"Obviously, with 1,700 pages of manuscript, I can't keep in all in my head", he added. "So from time to time I will say to my wife, 'Give me a number from one to 500.' I then look at the page corresponding to the number she's just given me, and see if anything on that page makes me want to know what happens next, or what happened just previously. The magic of storytelling is to want to make people listen breathlessly, if you're telling the story orally, or turn the page, if you're writing it. That's why, at the end of every one of my chapters, there's a big fat hook."

"The only thing that makes a best book – I don't like 'bestseller' – is that somebody tells them", he said. People who read my books expect to be entertained, to be forced to turn the page, to learn something on route. Gai-jin is a very easy way of learning about Japanese characters, characteristics, attitudes toward sex, food and politics, which apply today... If people are going to give me two or three weeks of their time, you have to repay them. I have to entertain them, I have to instruct them, and I have to allow them to learn something."

== Reception ==
The book placed sixth on the New York Times Best Seller list for May 9, 1993.

== Proposed adaptation ==
In 1993 NBC, who had huge success with a TV version of Shogun, announced they would broadcast an eight-hour mini series based on the book for the 1994–95 season. The series would have been a co-production between NBC Productions and RCS Video, the Italian-based international producer and distributor. "Gai-Jin will establish a landmark in international television co-productions and a new relation in the industry between the United States and Europe", said Paolo Gilsenti, managing director of RCS. Clavell and Susan Baerwald were to be executive producers.

Filming was to start February 25, 1995 outside Hiroshima, with a budget of $30 million and a cast including Edward Woodward, Diana Rigg, Ben Cross, Tim Curry and Roddy McDowall and Richard Chamberlain doing the narration. However a week into filming, production was halted. The reason given was an earthquake and rising production costs.

Clavell died in September 1994 and Gai-Jin was his last completed novel (he said he was working on a new one after Gai-Jin was published).
