= Shogun (disambiguation) =

Shōgun is a military rank and historical title in Japan.

Shogun may also refer to:

== Arts and media ==
=== Film and television ===
- Shōgun (1980 miniseries), based on the novel
- Shōgun (2024 TV series), also based on the novel
- "Shogun" (Legends of Tomorrow), an episode of Legends of Tomorrow

=== Gaming ===
- Shogun (videogame), 1986, by Virgin Games, now Avalon Interactive Group, Ltd.
- James Clavell's Shōgun, a 1989 interactive fiction computer game from Infocom
- Shogun (1986 board game), from Milton Bradley
- Shogun (2006 board game), by Dirk Henn
- Shogun: Total War, a 2000 video game
  - Total War: Shogun 2, a 2011 video game
- Raiden Shogun, a character in 2020 video game Genshin Impact

=== Literature ===
- Shōgun (novel), 1975, by James Clavell

=== Music ===
- Shogun (Trivium album)
- Shogun (Stormwitch album)
- Shogun Audio, a label imprint founded by DJ Friction

=== Other media ===
- The Sho-Gun, 1904 opera by George Ade and Gustav Luders
- Shōgun: The Musical, a 1990 musical based on the novel and the 1980 miniseries

== Vehicles ==
- Mitsubishi Pajero or Mitsubishi Shogun, an SUV
- Mitsubishi Fuso Super Great or Mitsubishi Shogun, a heavy-duty truck
- Shogun, a limited production batch of customized Ford Festivas
- Shogun, a brand of bicycle by Falcon Cycles

== Other uses ==
- Shogun (toolbox), an open source software library for C++
- Maurício Rua (born 1981), nicknamed "Shogun", mixed martial artist

== See also ==
- Shogun Warriors (toys), a product line by Mattel
- Shogunzords, colossal mechanical or bio-mechanical robotic Zords in the Power Rangers franchise
