= Tai-Pan (film) =

1986 film by Daryl Duke

- Theatrical release poster
- Directed by: Daryl Duke
- Written by: John Briley; Stanley Mann
- Based on: Tai-Pan by James Clavell
- Produced by: Raffaella De Laurentiis
- Starring: Bryan Brown; John Stanton; Joan Chen
- Cinematography: Jack Cardiff
- Edited by: Antony Gibbs
- Music by: Maurice Jarre
- Distributed by: De Laurentiis Entertainment Group (DEG)
- Release date: November 7, 1986
- Running time: 127 minutes
- Country: United States
- Language: English
- Budget: $25 million
- Box office: $2 million

Tai-Pan is a 1986 adventure drama film directed by Daryl Duke, loosely based on James Clavell's 1966 novel of the same name. While many of the same characters and plot twists are maintained, a few smaller occurrences are left out. Filmed under communist Chinese censorship, some portions of Clavell's story were considered too offensive to be filmed as written and considerable changes were made.

The De Laurentiis Entertainment Group handled the production and were actively seen battling the Chinese Government and Labor boards over the film during shooting. The film was a critical and box office bomb. Duke believed that a mini-series à la 1980's Shōgun or 1988's Noble House would have been a far superior means of covering the complexity of Clavell's novel.

== Plot ==
In 1842, the British have won the First Opium War and seized Hong Kong. Although the island is largely uninhabited and the terrain unfriendly, it has a large port that both the British government and various trading companies believe will be useful for the import of merchandise to be traded on mainland China, a highly lucrative market.

Dirk Struan and Tyler Brock, former shipmates and owners of two massive trading companies, have a rocky and often abusive relationship as seamen. Both men seek to destroy each other in matters of business and personal affairs. Struan is referred to as tai-pan indicating his position as head of the largest and most profitable of all the trading companies operating in Asia. Brock, owner of the second largest of the trading companies, constantly vies to destroy Struan's company and reputation in an attempt to both exact revenge on Struan and become the new tai-pan of Chinese trade.

== Cast ==
- Bryan Brown as Dirk Struan
- Joan Chen as May–May
- John Stanton as Tyler Brock
- Tim Guinee as Culum Struan
- Bill Leadbitter as Gorth Brock
- Russell Wong as Gordon Chen
- Katy Behean as Mary Sinclair
- Kyra Sedgwick as Tess Brock
- Janine Turner as Shevaun Tillman
- Norman Rodway as Aristotle Quance
- John Bennett as Captain Orlov
- Derrick Branche as Vargas
- Vic Armstrong as Drunken Sailor
- Dickey Beer as Brock's Crew
- Cheng Chuang as Jin Qua
- Chen Shu as Chen Sheng
- Rosemarie Dunham as Mrs. Fothergill
- Robert Easton as Count Zergeyev
- Richard Foo as Lin Din
- Nicholas Gecks as Horatio Sinclair
- Carol Gillies as Liza Brock
- Pat Gorman as British Merchant #2
- Michael C. Gwynne as Jeff Cooper
- Billy Horrigan as Brock's Crew
- Patrick Ryecart as Captain Glessing
- Bert Remsen as Wilf Tillman
- Rob Spendlove as Nagrek
- Lisa Lu as Ah-Gip
- Barbara Keogh as Mrs. Quance
- Denise Kellogg as Nude Model
- Joycelene Lu as Beaten Whore
- Chen Kuan-tai as Wung
- Leslie Peterkin as Piper

== Production ==
There had been numerous attempts to film Tai Pan over the years.

=== 1968 MGM proposed version ===
Martin Ransohoff of Filmways bought the rights to the novel by James Clavell in 1966 in conjunction with MGM for $500,000 plus a percentage of the profits. Clavell would write the script and co-produce. At the time Clavell was also working as a filmmaker, directing Sidney Poitier in To Sir, with Love.

Patrick McGoohan was announced to play Dirk Struan (the first of a two-picture deal he had with MGM) with Michael Anderson attached to direct. Carlo Ponti came in as co-producer. However the movie would have cost an estimated $26 million (later reduced to $20 million) and was postponed. It lingered on for a number of years before being finally cancelled when James T. Aubrey took over as president and cancelled the project.

=== Late 1970s proposed version ===
In 1975, Run Run Shaw had bought the rights from MGM and wanted to collaborate with Universal Studios to make a $12 million film. Carl Foreman wrote a screenplay, but the film was not made.

In the late 1970s, Georges-Alain Vuille obtained the rights and George MacDonald Fraser was hired to adapt the novel. Fraser's script met with approval – Vuille hired him to write a sequel – Richard Fleischer was attached to direct, and Steve McQueen agreed to star for a reported fee of $3 million. McQueen dropped out of the project but was still paid $1 million. Fraser thought Oliver Reed would have been ideal casting for the role of Brock.

Roger Moore became briefly attached, with John Guillermin mentioned as director of a possible mini-series. However finance could not be arranged. Moore said: "If it's offered to me again I'll do it. Quite frankly, it's one of the best scripts I've ever read". For a time Sean Connery was mooted as star for director Martin Ritt. "I've always wanted Sean to do it", said Clavell. Vuille eventually lost the rights and Fraser's script was not used in the final film.

=== Eventual production ===
The popularity of the novel and miniseries Shōgun made Tai Pan continually attractive to filmmakers. In late 1983, Dino De Laurentiis bought the rights. He set up the film with Orion. Connery turned down the lead role. The film was directed by Daryl Duke and starred Bryan Brown, who had worked together on The Thorn Birds. It was the first English-language film shot in China. Shooting was extremely difficult, due in part to abundant red tape. De Laurentiis later claimed filming in China was a big mistake.

== Reception ==
The film gained poor reviews. Walter Goodman of The New York Times said of it: "You have to say this for Tai-Pan: it's ridiculous – but in a big way. It's two hours of Super Comics: Bearded Brutes! Busty Belles! Bloody Blades! Exotic Settings! Colorful Costumes! A Beheading! A Castration! A Typhoon!" Roger Ebert called it "the embodiment of those old movie posters where the title is hewn from solid rock and tiny figures scale it with cannons strapped to their backs, while the bosoms of their women heave in the foreground. [...] Of the women of Tai-Pan, it can be said that Joan Collins could have played each and every one of them at some point in her career". The Los Angeles Times' Kevin Thomas said, "anyone who enjoyed James Clavell's epic novel of the early China traders can only wish that it had never arrived. So truly and consistently terrible is Tai-Pan that it could stand as a textbook example of how not to adapt a historical adventure-romance into a movie". Chen was nominated for two Golden Raspberry Awards as Worst Actress and Worst New Star (both for Joan Chen) at the 7th Golden Raspberry Awards.

Tai-Pan holds a 13% rating on Rotten Tomatoes based on seven reviews.

=== Box office ===
The film was not a box office success. Clavell expressed disappointment with the film adaptation: "I haven't seen the film. It just hasn't been convenient for me to see it ... I would like to get the rights to my book back and turn it into a mini-series". Clavell eventually did buy back the rights in July 1991.
