= Asian Saga =

Series of six novels written by James Clavell

- King Rat (1962); Tai-Pan (1966); Shōgun (1975); Noble House (1981); Whirlwind (1986); Gai-Jin (1993)
- Author: James Clavell
- Language: English
- Genre: Historical fiction
- Published: 1962–1993
- Media type: Print, ebook
- No. of books: 6

The Asian Saga is a series of six novels written by James Clavell between 1962 and 1993. The novels all centre on Europeans in Asia, and together explore the impact on East and West of the meeting of these two distinct civilizations.

== Overview ==
The name Asian Saga was first applied to the series after Shōgun had been published. The purpose of the Asian Saga was, according to Clavell—descendant of a family long in service to the British Empire, and who was a prisoner of war of the Japanese during the Second World War—to tell "the story of the Anglo-Saxon in Asia".

Ordered by publication date:

1. King Rat (1962)
2. Tai-Pan (1966)
3. Shōgun (1975)
4. Noble House (1981)
5. Whirlwind (1986)
6. Gai-Jin (1993)

Ordered by internal chronology:

1. Shōgun: set in feudal Japan, 1600. 1152 pages.
2. Tai-Pan: set in Hong Kong, 1841. 727 pages.
3. Gai-Jin: set in Japan, 1862. 1126 pages.
4. King Rat: set in a Japanese POW camp, Singapore, 1945. 400 pages.
5. Noble House: set in Hong Kong, 1963. 1171 pages.
6. Whirlwind: set in Iran, 1979. 1147 pages (Abridged with some rewritten parts as Escape, 598 pages)

Four of the six books—Tai-Pan, Gai-Jin, Noble House, and Whirlwind—follow the dealings of the great trading company Struan's, the Noble House of Asia (based on Jardine Matheson Holdings Limited), its founder Dirk Struan, and his various descendants. Gai-Jin provides the major link between the Shōgun and Struan's storylines.

Some of the characters make appearances in multiple books, and many characters from one book are referred to in later books. For example, two characters from King Rat (Robin Grey and Peter Marlowe) reappear in Noble House, and Robert Armstrong is a major character in both Noble House and Whirlwind. As a tie-in, Linc Bartlett's (Noble House) namesake ancestor appears in Clavell's film Walk Like a Dragon (1960).

There are dozens of characters throughout the series, with very complex family relationships and a great deal of history that is hinted at but never described in detail. For instance, the character John Marlowe in the prequel "Gai-jin" is almost certainly meant to be an ancestor of "King Rat" protagonist Peter Marlowe. Clavell peppers the entire Asian Saga with these genealogical Easter eggs.

After publishing Whirlwind, Clavell wrote a shorter version of the story which focused on two characters from the book. Titled Escape: The Love Story from Whirlwind, the book is generally not considered an official part of the Asian Saga; nonetheless, some reviewers said it helped flesh out several aspects of the original novel.

In 1980, Clavell stated that, beyond Noble House, future entries in the series would include Nippon, set in 1970s Japan, and China, set in the present and future. The preface to Gai-jin (1993) introduces the book as "the second novel in the Shōgun quartet," suggesting that at least two more Japan-focused books were planned. Any such intentions were cut short by Clavell's 1994 death.

== Plot ==
=== List of tai-pans of Struan's ===
- 1st tai-pan: Dirk Struan, 1828–1841
- 2nd tai-pan: Culum Struan, 1841–1862
- 3rd tai-pan: Sir Lochlin Struan, 1862–1873??
- 4th tai-pan: Dirk Dunross, 1873–1894
- 5th tai-pan: Sir Lochlin Struan, 1894–1908 (see notes)
- 6th tai-pan: Ross Lechie Struan, 1908–1915
- 7th tai-pan: Sir Ross Struan, 1915–19?? (see notes)
- 8th tai-pan: Colin Dunross, 19??–1949
- 9th tai-pan: Alastair Struan, 1949–1960
- 10th tai-pan: Ian Dunross, 1960–1970
- 11th tai-pan: David MacStruan, 1970–1975 (see notes)
- 12th tai-pan: Linbar Struan, 1975–19?
- 5th tai-pan (in name only): Kelly O'Gorman, 1894–1915 (see notes)

=== The half coins of Jin-qua ===
In 1841, when Struan's was on the brink of collapse, Dirk Struan received a loan of silver from the merchant Jin-qua in exchange for a series of favors. Among these were four bronze coins, split in half, four halves given to Dirk Struan, the other four halves kept by Jin-qua. Anyone who brought a half coin to the tai-pan of the Noble House would be granted whatever he asked, whether legal or illegal. All future tai-pans must swear to keep this bargain, before learning the details, if they were to become tai-pan. This served as repayment to the loan of silver.

Of the four coins, one was kept by Jin-qua, passed down through his family. One given to the warlord Wu Fang Choi. One given to Gordon Chen, and passed down through his family, and one given out in secret.

The first coin was brought to Dirk Struan in 1841 by Wu Fang Choi.

The second coin was brought in 1894 by Chiang Wu-tah. He asked that the Noble House give aid and sanctuary to Sun Yat-sen and to assist him to overthrow the Manchu dynasty. This is recounted in Noble House, chapter 60. In the movie however, the second coin is stated to have been returned to Hag Struan in 1911.

The story of the third coin is a major plot line in Noble House. The coin is owned by Struan's trusted compradore Phillip Chen, handed down to him from his grandfather Gordon Chen. However, his son John Chen learns the secret of the coin, steals it, and bargains it and its secret away to American businessman Lincoln Bartlett. Before Bartlett takes possession of the coin, John Chen is kidnapped and murdered. When Phillip Chen enlists his underworld cousin Four Finger Wu to help locate John, Wu discovers the coin in the possession of one of the kidnappers, and takes it for his own, knowing its secret. When Wu dies, his son Profitable Choy takes over the coin and begs the favours from Ian Dunross.

The fate of the fourth coin is never addressed in the published books of the saga, but would presumably have been resolved in a future installment if Clavell had lived longer. It is speculated in Noble House that it was given to May-may (Dirk Struan's mistress) and passed down to their descendant Sir Shih-teh "Shitee" T'Chung.

== Adaptations ==
As of 2024, four installments of the Asian Saga have been adapted for film or television:

- King Rat (1965), starring George Segal, was nominated for two Academy Awards for Art Direction and Black and White Cinematography.
- Shōgun (1980), was adapted by NBC as a television miniseries starring Richard Chamberlain, Toshiro Mifune, and Yoko Shimada; the production was one of the highest rated programs of its kind ever broadcast.
  - The nine-hour miniseries was nominated for 14 Emmy Awards, winning three including Best Limited Series. It also won three Golden Globe Awards.
  - A two-hour version received a theatrical release in 1981.
- Tai-Pan (1986), released as a theatrical film starring Bryan Brown and Joan Chen, was a critical and box office failure.
- Noble House (1988) was adapted as a TV miniseries starring Pierce Brosnan and was a ratings success. It updated the timeframe of the novel from the 1960s to the 1980s and took many liberties with key points of the novel (for example, Ian Dunross became a bachelor who had a romance with Casey Tcholok).
- Shōgun (2024): The channel FX has released a series on its Hulu platform. It became the first Japanese-language series to win a Primetime Emmy Award for Outstanding Drama Series, with its first season winning 18 categories at the 76th Primetime Emmy Awards and 76th Primetime Creative Arts Emmy Awards, setting a new record as the most awarded single season of television in Emmy history. It additionally received four Golden Globe Awards, including Best Television Series – Drama and several acting wins. The series also won a Peabody Award at the 85th Annual Ceremony.

Although there were press reports in the mid-1990s that a miniseries adaptation of Gai-Jin was planned, no production eventuated.
