= Noble House (miniseries) =

US television drama series

- North American DVD cover (2008)
- Genre: Action drama
- Based on: Noble House by James Clavell
- Screenplay by: Eric Bercovici
- Directed by: Gary Nelson
- Starring: Pierce Brosnan; Deborah Raffin; Ben Masters; John Rhys-Davies; Gordon Jackson
- Composer: Paul Chihara
- Country of origin: United States
- Original language: English
- No. of episodes: 4

Production
- Executive producer: James Clavell
- Producers: Eric Bercovici; Frederick Muller
- Production location: Hong Kong
- Editor: Peter Holt
- Running time: 376 minutes

Original release
- Network: NBC
- Release: February 21 – February 24, 1988

Noble House is an American action-drama television miniseries that was produced by De Laurentiis Entertainment Group, and broadcast by NBC in four segments on February 21–24, 1988. Based on the 1981 novel of the same name by James Clavell, it features a large cast headlined by Pierce Brosnan as business tycoon Ian Dunross and was directed by Gary Nelson. Due to time restrictions, several of the many subplots from the book were removed.

This was NBC's second miniseries adaptation of a Clavell novel, the first being 1980's highly successful Shōgun. Both take place in the same fictional universe, with Noble House featuring connections to Shōgun and another Clavell work, Tai-Pan.

For the miniseries, the timeframe of the novel was changed; Clavell's original novel takes place in the early 1960s, but the miniseries was updated to the 1980s. The building prominently displayed and used as Struan's is Jardine House.

== Synopsis ==
Despite being the most powerful Hong Kong trading company, Struan & Company (the Noble House) is in trouble. Ian Dunross (Pierce Brosnan) is appointed as tai-pan of Struan and the inherited legacy of intense rivalry and hatred between him and Quillan Gornt (John Rhys-Davies) and his company Rothwell-Gornt reaches its highest level. Overextended by the previous management, Dunross issued public stock to improve Struan’s financial standing. However, it has not given Struan the capital it needs. As a result, Dunross is courting the owner of Par Con Industries, American billionaire Lincoln "Linc" Bartlett (Ben Masters), who arrives from California in his private jet, accompanied by his beautiful vice-president, Casey Tcholok (Deborah Raffin), with the apparent goal of closing a profitable deal with Dunross, a deal that would also benefit Struan. In the jet also arrives Bartlett’s secret employee John Chen (Steven Vincent Leigh), shocking his father, Phillip Chen (Burt Kwouk), a loyal director and compradore of Struan's, who becomes suspicious of his son. Unknown to everybody in Hong Kong, Bartlett obtained Struan's key financial documents from John, and because Bartlett only cares about making money, he secretly decides to back Dunross's arch enemy, Gornt, who will stop at nothing to destroy Dunross and to become the new tai-pan of the Noble House. During their first meeting, to impress Bartlett, Gornt picks up the phone and starts a run on Ho-Pak Bank (a small but sound local bank), basically ruining it. After Bartlett leaves, Gornt convinces some of Dunross's tough adversaries to gather for the kill. Gornt's strategy to take over Struan consists in selling short massive quantities of Struan stock. By selling the stock he borrowed (and causing panic to other investors), Gornt could make the price of the stock drop significantly, allowing him to make substantial profits if he can buy the stock back at a very low price (and with enough shares, Gornt could take control of Struan). However, Gornt also knows that if the stock price does not drop enough, he could face significant losses and even lose it all. Initially, Casey is completely unaware of Bartlett's double play, but after she learns about it, she tells him this could backfire, and then Bartlett tells her confidently that no matter what happens, they will become the Noble House (apparently, his true goal from the very beginning).

When Dunross realizes that Gornt is suddenly strong enough to take over the Noble House, he quickly reaches out to old friends (from Hong Kong, Macau, and China), including opium lord "Four Finger" Wu Sang Fang (Khigh Dhiegh), in the hope that they will help him raise enough capital to save the Noble House by buying its own stock. All of the old friends, including Macau's rich gold trader and casino owner Lando Mata (Damien Thomas) and Bank of China’s enigmatic contact Tip Tok-Toh (Keith Bonnard), discuss possible ways to help the tai-pan, but most of them are willing to help only in exchange for significant influence on Struan, which the tai-pan is very reticent about. While all of this occurs, Dunross and Casey get close to each other very quickly and spontaneously, and later they develop strong feelings for each other (a visit to Macau marks the pinnacle of their personal affairs).

One of the subplots of the mini-series involves the missing half of an ancient coin, initially in the hands of its legitimate owner, Phillip Chen (who works directly for Dunross). Whoever has the half-coin can ask any favor (in principle, legal or illegal) of the tai-pan. In the night of his arrival, John steals the half-coin from Phillip, his father, with the intention of selling it to Bartlett. But soon after, John is kidnapped and later killed by a group of criminals led by the Werewolf, who takes possession of the half-coin without knowing its value; but the next night, all of them are killed by Wu (and his henchmen), who gets the half-coin, which he plans to use to force the tai-pan to help him smuggle opium and expand his criminal activities. Later in (Aberdeen Harbour), Wu meets Dunross, shows him the half-coin, and then demands that some favors be granted to him, but Dunross replies that even if the half-coin was authentic there would not be favors because the half-coin was stolen (however, the tai-pan knows he has no choice but to grant the favors). Wu hands in a wax mould of the half-coin to Dunross so that he could confirm its authenticity. Later, Dunross meets Phillip and shows him the wax mould. A shocked Phillip reacts by saying that Bartlett must have given it to Dunross, who concludes that John must have been the one who gave key Struan confidential documents to Bartlett. Embarrassed and upset, Phillip then says that it must have been actually Wu who presented the half-coin, but that it belonged to him. Dunross tells Phillip that all Struan documents he has must be returned to him immediately (which Phillips does) and that he must raise $40 million for Struan by Sunday midnight (that is, in less than two days). On Sunday afternoon, embarrassed by John's treason to Struan and upset from learning that Wu stole his half-coin, Phillip tells Dunross in person that he will protect the Noble House at all costs, suggesting he will kill Wu so that no favor will be granted to the ambitious criminal. However, Dunross tells him that if he doesn't bring him the $40 million by midnight, there will not be a Noble House to protect.

Another subplot refers to Chinese espionage in then British-controlled Hong Kong. Brian Kwok (Lim Kay Tong) is a very professional and loyal Superintendent working for Hong Kong's police expected to become Assistant Commissioner in a few years, and is part of the police team investigating John's kidnapping. While investigating the kidnapping, Superintendent Robert Armstrong (Gordon Jackson), a close friend of Brian, discovers a picture of Brian and his mother that was taken in mainland China not long ago. Since there is no official travel information that Brian ever visited China, Armstrong and the Commissioner soon conclude that Brian is a Chinese spy, and then arrest and torture him. The Chinese government learns about this situation, and Tip Tok-Toh tells the tai-pan that his childhood friend Tsu-Yan (Ric Young), now the Chairman of China Great Wall International Trust Corporation, would like to meet him in Beijing. Dunross flies to Beijing a few hours later, hoping to get the funds he desperately needs. In their meeting, Tsu-Yan tells Dunross (who is one of the most powerful businessmen in Hong Kong and knows the governor) that in exchange for a $300 million-dollar credit line to Struan, Dunross must secure the release of Brian and his safe return to China. Right after his return to Hong Kong, the tai-pan meets the governor and basically tells him that there could be catastrophic economic consequences for Hong Kong if China decides not to financially support the island anymore, and that for that not to happen, China is only asking that the governor frees Brian. The governor makes it clear that he considers Dunross's statement blackmail, but it is implied that he also understands very well that Hong Kong really depends on China's financial support.

An additional subplot involves the relationship between Bartlett and Orlanda Ramos (Julia Nickson), a beautiful Eurasian young TV reporter who was Gornt's mistress for five years (and who has been just his friend for the past three years). At the end of his first meeting with Barlett, Gornt introduces Orlanda to Bartlett, with the intention to use her as a distraction to Barlett, who quickly develops interest in Orlanda, who goes ahead with Gornt's plan. Interestingly, Orlanda starts developing feelings for Bartlett, which creates emotional conflicts to her, as she starts wondering whether she should either remain loyal to her friend Gornt or let her feelings become stronger for Bartlett. Eventually, an enamored Bartlett realizes that all of this was Gornt’s plan and confronts Orlanda. Overwhelmed by her emotions, including guilt, she tells him that years ago she betrayed Gornt's love, and then she asked for forgiveness, but Gornt still punished her harshly. She also tells Bartlett that she had initially agreed to just distract him, but that now she was in love with him; and then they kiss and agree to be together. Later, Gornt meets Orlanda and shows her a brand-new Jaguar, a present for her great job with Bartlett. She immediately tells Gornt that she cannot accept it and that they will not be friends anymore, and he accepts her decision and leaves with the car.

One more subplot is related to Gornt's orchestrated bank run on small but sound Ho-Pak Bank, headed by Richard Kwang (Bennett Ohta). In his first meeting with Bartlett, he tries to show his power to Bartlett by starting a run on the small bank with the clear intention to ruin it. When asked why this particular bank was chosen, Gornt says that he just never liked Kwang. The false rumors spread quickly, creating very long lines of desperate people who want to withdraw their deposits from Ho-Pak, and opportunities for the criminal Werewolf to extort people with the help of an old woman who tells him who is withdrawing money from the bank and how much. The police quickly become suspicious of the old woman and issue a warrant for her. While inspecting her house, Superintendent Armstrong finds the picture taken of Brian and his mother in China, the picture that later causes the arrest and torture of Brian for suspicion of espionage. Kwang eventually manages to save some of its investments in Ho-Pak by agreeing to merge it with Victoria Bank (one of the largest Hong Kong's banks).

Going back to the main plot, interestingly, Orlanda and Wu's mistress Venus Poon (Tia Carrere) both live in the Rose Court apartment building, where coincidently Dunross is attending a party, as are Gornt and some of the most important Hong Kong's businessmen. Gornt, Dunross, and Casey leave the party early. Bartlett is staying at Orlanda's, who goes out to the supermarket to get some food, and Wu is visiting his mistress. Suddenly a landslide destroys the building, killing Wu and others. A shocked Orlanda arrives and tells Dunross that Bartlett is inside, so he starts looking through the wreckage for Bartlett and finds him half buried but alive. Suddenly, more water gets into the wreckage, and Bartlett dies. In the meantime, Wu's (seventh) son Paul Choy (Ping Wu) recovers the stolen half coin from his father and then redeems it for a seat in Struan's board of directors and two other favors from the tai-pan.

Early the next morning, just when it seems that the fall of the Noble House is inevitable in a matter of hours, the governor orders Brian's immediate release and safe passage to China. Tip Tok-Toh then tells Dunross that he now has access to the credit line granted by China Great Wall, and these funds allow him to foil Gornt's Machiavellian scheme. Before the stock market opens in Hong Kong (with an expected high price of $30 per share of Struan, which would mean the demise of Gornt), he meets Dunross outside his mansion, and the tai-pan tells him that he will let Gornt buy back the stock at $18 before the market opens, but he will also have to hand in the property of Asian Airlines to Struan. Gornt accepts the terms of the agreement immediately, since it will help him avoid going bankrupt, and then he leaves. Following Barlett's death, Casey becomes head of Par Con Industries, allying it with Struan. Later, Casey visits a very distressed Orlanda (the landslide took her beloved Bartlett and everything else from her), gives her a check that she says is from Linc, and convinces her to go to the United States with her, where she would be able to pursue a new future. Moreover, it is revealed that Dunross and Casey are in love. Casey leaves Hong Kong but accepts Dunross's offer to return a month later to be with him. In the end, Dunross is seen looking at Hong Kong's skyline from his mansion, suggesting he is ready for the next challenges the Noble House will face.

== Differences from the novel ==
Many of the subplots from the novel were left out of the miniseries to simplify the plot. A significant story arc involving KGB espionage in Hong Kong was deleted as the mini-series aired near the close of the Cold War. A further story line involving visiting UK Members of Parliament was removed, as was another involving a former prisoner of war, which provided a link to Clavell's novel King Rat. In the miniseries, Tip Tok-Toh was changed from a mysterious, unofficial contact of the Bank of China to a good friend of Dunross who often appeared at parties.

The romance between Dunross and Tcholok is not present in the book, and several of the book's subplots involving Dunross's family were removed from the miniseries. In the novel, Dunross is married and his wife, eldest daughter, sister, and two brothers-in-law (his wife's brother and his sister's husband) are involved in significant subplots while his youngest daughter, son and a cousin also appear in minor roles. In the mini-series, Dunross is a widower and no family members are mentioned.

The bank run depicted in the mini-series was significantly smaller in scope and significance than that depicted in the novel. Finally, in the novel, Struan's is bailed out by the fictional First Central Bank of New York. Although First Central and its vice-president, Dave Murtagh, a significant character in the novel, are mentioned in the mini-series, they play no role in bailing out the Noble House. The Bank of China assumes this role in return for Dunross arranging the release of captured Chinese police mole, Brian Kwok.

== Cast ==
Starring

- Pierce Brosnan as Ian Dunross
- Deborah Raffin as Casey Tcholok
- Ben Masters as Linc Bartlett
- John Rhys-Davies as Quillan Gornt
- Julia Nickson as Orlanda Ramos
- Khigh Dhiegh as "Four Finger" Wu
- Gordon Jackson as Supt. Robert Armstrong
- Burt Kwouk as Phillip Chen
- Nancy Kwan as Claudia Chen
- John van Dreelen as Jacques DeVille
- Ping Wu as Paul Choy
- Lim Kay Tong as Brian Kwok
- Lisa Lu as Ah-Tam
- Damien Thomas as Lando Mata
- Dudley Sutton as Commissioner Roger Crosse
- Ric Young as Tsu-Yan
- Tia Carrere as Venus Poon
- Steven Leigh as John Chen

Special appearance by

- John Houseman as Sir Geoffrey Allison
- Denholm Elliott as Alastair Struan

Supporting cast members

- Irene Tsu as Dianne Chen
- Harris Laskawy as Charles Biltzmann
- Leon Lissek as Christian Toxe
- Keith Bonnard as Tip Tok-Toh
- Edward Petherbridge as Jason Plumm
- Bennett Ohta as Richard Kwang
- Brian Fong as "Goodweather" Poon
- Helen Funai as Mrs. Kwang
- David Shaughnessy as Dr. Dorn
- John Fujioka as "Baldhead" Kin
- Richard Durden as Paul Havergill
- David Henry as Bruce Johnjohn
- George Innes as Alexi Travkin
- Choy-Ling Man as Mary Li
- Pip Miller as Inspector John Smyth
- Michael Siberry as Linbar Struan
- Duncan Preston as Richard Pugmire
- Vincent Wong as Lim Chu
- Galen Yuen as "Smallpox" Kin
- Nicholas Pryor as Seymour Steigler

== Production ==
Brosnan had signed to play James Bond, but was prevented from fulfilling the role because of his previous commitment to the Remington Steele television series, which went back into production. Ian Dunross was his first role after Remington Steele.

John Rhys-Davies, who played Quillan Gornt in Noble House, had previously played Vasco Rodrigues in the 1980 miniseries Shōgun, likewise within Clavell's Asian Saga.

Clavell said of the adaptation:

I never really want to doctor my work for TV. We had a problem with Noble House, as with most of the books. There are so many subplots and interwoven characters that we had to drop some things. We felt the changes would work well—and I approved it. Eric goes through the book and literally tears out many of the lesser characters. There's no way it can be done otherwise. I hope Noble House will do for Hong Kong what Shogun did for Japan. In my opinion it remains the queen city of Asia and will go on forever despite the changes coming up in the next few years.

Clavell said that production of the mini series was rushed. NBC did not offer to make it until September 1986, and wanted it within 14 months. He said:

Pierce... simply fell into our lap when he couldn't do the 007 job... It was NBC who suggested Masters (as American corporate raider Linc Bartlett). Frankly I'd never heard of him. Raffin (Casey Tcholok, Bartlett's vice president) was the best of the actresses available to us. Casting, especially at this speed, always has a huge element of luck. Later you learn whether your luck was good or bad. If I sound cavalier, I assure you I'm not. It's terribly important to me that this be well received. Miniseries deals for King Rat and Whirlwind are riding on the success or failure of Noble House, which explains my current state of sweaty anticipation.

The budget was $20 million. Filming took place in Hong Kong and North Carolina.

== Ratings ==
Broadcast in competition with the 1988 Winter Olympics on ABC, the ratings for the program were generally disappointing. The first installment was the 16th most watched prime time television show of the week (27 rating). The last three installments fell into the next week of Nielsen ratings, and the second installment was 22nd (15.9 rating/24 percent audience share), overshadowed by Olympics coverage. Part 3 was ranked 28th (15.0 rating), and the last episode was 20th (16.3 share).
