= Noble House (novel) =

1981 novel by James Clavell

- First edition (UK)
- Author: James Clavell
- Language: English
- Series: Asian Saga
- Genre: Historical novel
- Publisher: Delacorte Press (US); Hodder & Stoughton (UK)
- Publication date: April 1981
- Publication place: United Kingdom, United States
- Media type: Print (hardback & paperback)
- Pages: 1171 (paperback)
- ISBN: 0-385-28737-2 (first edition, hardback)
- OCLC: 233936182
- Preceded by: King Rat (in chronology of Asian Saga)
- Followed by: Whirlwind

Noble House is a novel by James Clavell, published in 1981 and set in Hong Kong in 1963. It is the fourth book published in Clavell's Asian Saga and is chronologically the fifth book in the series. The "Noble House" in the title is the nickname of Struan's, the trading company first introduced in Clavell's Tai-Pan.

The novel is over a thousand pages long, and contains dozens of characters and numerous intermingling plot lines. While primarily a sequel to Tai-Pan, the book also references characters and events from King Rat and Shogun, thereby retroactively establishing that all of Clavell's novels take place in a shared fictional universe. In 1988, it was adapted as a television miniseries for NBC, starring Pierce Brosnan. The miniseries updates the storyline of the novel to the 1980s.

== Plot summary ==
Noble House is set in 1963 and serves as a sequel to Clavell's novel Tai-Pan. Ian Dunross, the 10th tai-pan of Struan's and a descendant of founder Dirk Struan, struggles to rescue the company from the precarious financial position left by his predecessor. To this end, he seeks partnership with American millionaire Lincoln Bartlett, while trying to ward off his arch-rival Quillan Gornt, who seeks to destroy Struan's once and for all. Meanwhile, Chinese communists, Taiwanese nationalists, and Soviet spies illegally vie for influence in Hong Kong while the British government seeks to prevent their actions. Anyone seeking to stop them cannot do so without enlisting the aid of Hong Kong's criminal underworld. Other obstacles include water shortages, landslides, bank runs and stock market crashes.

In Noble House, Dunross finds his company the target of a hostile takeover at a time when Struan's is desperately overextended. He is also embroiled in international espionage when he finds himself in possession of secret documents desperately desired by both the KGB and MI6. The novel follows Dunross' attempts to extricate himself from all this and to save Struan's, the Noble House.

Dunross also inherited the "coin debt" obligation first introduced in Tai-Pan. As tai-pan of Struan's, he must fulfill the request, whether legal or illegal, to anyone who presents one of the half coins that were initially split by Dirk Struan and the trader Jin Qua, serving as repayment for the latter's loan of silver. The first half coin was redeemed during the events in the previous novel, and the second coin between the events of Tai-Pan and Noble House. Noble House follows the fate of the third half coin (an illustration of the coin is prominently featured on the cover of several editions of the novel).

== Background ==
Struan and Company is based on Jardine Matheson & Company, which continues to exist as an Asian trading company. The chief character, Ian Dunross, is believed to be a composite character of two real life Jardine Matheson tai-pans, Sir Hugh Barton and Sir Michael Herries.

Rothwell-Gornt is based on Butterfield and Swire, now known as Swire Pacific. Quillan Gornt is based on two Swire tai-pans, John Kidston "Jock" Swire and William Charles Goddard Knowles.

Unlike the other Asian Saga novels, Noble House is not closely based on a specific series of events, but is more a snapshot of the 1960s in Hong Kong, serving as a capsule history of Jardine Matheson against the backdrop of the impending Vietnam War and the recent Kim Philby defection. Though the prologue is set on June 8, 1960 against the backdrop of the real Typhoon Mary, the story opens on Sunday, August 18, 1963, and runs through the days immediately preceding the assassination of US President John F. Kennedy.

In 1961, Jardine Matheson became a public company, with the initial offer oversubscribed over 56 times, which is attributed in the novel to tai-pan Ian Dunross. In 1963, the Hongkong Land (fictionalized as Asian Properties) subsidiary of Jardine Matheson opened the Mandarin Oriental Hotel, which has today become one of the world's leading hotels. The Dairy Farm subsidiary of Jardine Matheson moved into the supermarket sector in 1964 with the acquisition of Wellcome (fictionalized as Hong Kong General Stores).

A Jardine Matheson representative office was established in Australia in 1963 (fictionalized as the next assignment of Linbar Struan). The Ho Pak bank run storyline mirrored the real Hang Seng Bank run in 1965. The two primary banks, Victoria Bank and Blacs, were the fictionalized HSBC and Standard Chartered, respectively. The big set-pieces—the fire on the boat and the landslide—were closely modeled on real events (the Jumbo Floating Restaurant fire in 1971 and the Kotewall Road disaster in 1972).

The Macau businessman who controlled the gold trade in partnership with Struans, Lando Mata, is based on a composite of two famous Macau businessmen, Pedro José Lobo and Stanley Ho. The Noble House compradore family, the Chens, are based on the Hotung family. The American-Chinese scientist who defected to China and helped develop the first atom bomb for China, Dr. Joseph Yu, is a fictionalized version of renowned Caltech scientist Dr. Qian Xuesen. Sir Dunstan Barre is based on Sir Douglas Clague while the character Tsu-yan is based on Hong Kong businessman Henry Fok.

A major difference between the original novel and the television miniseries adaptation is that the television version changes the setting from 1963 to the late 1980s, and updates visible technology and the general atmosphere accordingly. The looming return of Hong Kong to China in 1997 is frequently mentioned in the miniseries, which was not a major concern in the 1960s.

== Main characters ==
- Ian Dunross: tenth tai-pan of Struan's, who rose to that office in 1960 and took the company public. Prior to this, he was a lifelong Struan's employee, a son and grandson of previous tai-pans. During World War II, Dunross served as a fighter pilot until being grounded after being shot down. Dunross finds his company the target of a hostile takeover from his arch-rival Quillan Gornt at a time when it is desperately overextended. He is also embroiled in international espionage when he finds himself in possession of secret documents desperately desired by both the KGB and MI6. Though one of many characters in the novel, Dunross is the only one involved with all the main plot lines. In the 1988 NBC miniseries Noble House, Dunross was portrayed by Pierce Brosnan.
- Quillan Gornt: tai-pan of Rothwell-Gornt, a major Hong Kong trading company based on the real company Butterfield and Swire (known today as Swire Pacific). As a descendant of Tyler Brock, he is the blood enemy of Ian Dunross and the entire Struan's company, which Gornt seeks to destroy. Gornt schemes to persuade millionaire Lincoln Bartlett to partner with him, rather than with Dunross. He uses whatever devious and underhanded means available to accomplish this, while trying his best to seduce Bartlett's partner and vice-president Casey Tcholok. Quillan Gornt is loosely based on the composite of two real life Swire taipans John Kidston "Jock" Swire and William Knowles. In the miniseries he is played by John Rhys-Davies.
- Lincoln Bartlett: American millionaire, head of Par-Con Industries. He is a devotee of Sun Tzu and views business as a kind of war. He believes in corporate espionage and misleading his partners as he vies for advantage. But he is an honest businessman according to the rules that he accepts, and he does not engage in illegal activities. He is in love with his Executive Vice President, Casey Tcholok.
- Casey Tcholok: Kamalian Ciranoush (K.C.) Tcholok, Vice President of Par-Con Industries. Casey is charged with putting together a partnership deal with Struan's, a deal which is critical to save Struan's from ruin. In the meantime, Bartlett is exploring doing the deal with Struan's rival Quillan Gornt.
- Robert Armstrong: Armstrong serves as a police inspector in Hong Kong. Because of his skill and intelligence, he was promoted to Special Intelligence, a branch concerned with counter-espionage.
- Phillip Chen: a director and fourth compradore of Struan's, and a descendant of the company's founder Dirk Struan, and second compradore, Gordon Chen. His full name is Phillip T'Chung Sheng Chen.
- John Chen: the favorite son of Phillip Chen. He is set to inherit the title of compradore from his father, but plans to sell out by giving confidential information to Bartlett. John steals Jin-Qua's half-coin that was given to Gordon Chen and passed down the family. But before he can give or sell the coin to Bartlett, John is kidnapped by a gang and eventually killed by his captors.
- Roger Crosse: Senior Superintendent, director of Special Intelligence, meaning he is the senior British intelligence officer in Hong Kong. Crosse is secretly trading secrets with Soviet agents in Hong Kong and, throughout most of the book, appears to be a secret communist and the leader of a KGB plan code named "Sevrin" to subvert both Hong Kong and China. At the end of the book, it is implied that he is a double, or perhaps even triple agent and that Sevrin is, in fact, an MI6 plot to deceive the Soviets .
- Brian Kwok: Hong Kong police Superintendent, working in Special Intelligence. He is being groomed to be the first ever Chinese assistant police commissioner. He was sent to Hong Kong from mainland China at age 6, won a scholarship to an English public school at age 12, and two years later in 1939 moved to Canada because of the war. He served in the Royal Canadian Mounted Police in Vancouver Chinatown, before transferring to Hong Kong.
- Four Finger Wu: Wu Sang Fang is the head of the Seaborne Wu, a large smuggling fleet. He is also a descendant of Wu Fang Choi, a Chinese pirate in Tai-Pan to whom Jin Qua gave one of the half coins, which he later redeemed to Dirk Struan. He boasts his fleet will smuggle anything, anywhere. This includes gold and narcotic smuggling. He has Old Friend status with Struan's, indicating that the two families have had a long working relationship and have built up a great deal of trust. Ian Dunross, the current tai-pan of Struan's, continues to cultivate this relationship, though he encourages Wu to avoid narcotics trafficking as being too dangerous. After Wu agrees to help find the kidnapped John Chen, he discovers the stolen half coin in the possession of the kidnappers, and takes it for his own.
- Paul "Profitable" Choy: The seventh son of Four Finger Wu, publicly known as his nephew. Unlike his father, he was educated in America, eventually receiving a Harvard MBA. His nickname Profitable comes from his skill at effecting tremendous business coups and creating huge wealth. Following the death of his father, Profitable Choy took and redeemed Jin-Qua's half-coin to establish a Chinese stock exchange in Hong Kong with the aid of Ian Dunross, and to be appointed as a managing director of Struan's. By the time of Whirlwind, he has become one of the richest and most powerful Chinese businessmen in Hong Kong.
- Orlanda Ramos: the half-Portuguese, half-Chinese Orlanda Ramos was given to Quillan Gornt as a mui-jai, a gift given by a debtor (her father) to his creditor (Gornt) to settle his account. Gornt paid for her education until she was 17, at which time she became his mistress. Orlanda entertains Linc Bartlett during his time in Hong Kong, and the question arises as to whether she is truly interested in the CEO of Par-Con or merely seducing Bartlett into taking Gornt's side against the Noble House. Bartlett's growing attachment to Orlanda causes a great deal of tension between himself and Casey but he continues to be completely drawn to her in spite of any imminent danger.
- Peter Marlowe: a former Royal Air Force officer and pilot during World War II before he was taken prisoner and imprisoned in Changi Prison, then a Japanese prisoner-of-war camp. He was also the second main character in King Rat. Marlowe is the fictional counterpart of the book's author, James Clavell. He is visiting Hong Kong with his wife, Fleur, to research and write a novel about Hong Kong's history.
- Jacques DeVille: Born in France, is one of the four Noble House Board members during the 1960s. Grandson of the 4th Noble House tai-pan. He had been recruited by the Soviets in 1941, and by 1963 was an honorary captain in the KGB Soviet Security Force. The Soviets had plans to make him the tai-pan, replacing Ian Dunross.

== Writing ==
Clavell's first novel, King Rat (1962), is set in 1940s Singapore. His second novel, Tai-Pan (1966), is set in 1840s Hong Kong. After visiting Hong Kong to research Tai-Pan in 1963, Clavell returned regularly to the island. He wanted to write a novel about modern day Hong Kong which used some characters from King Rat and descendants of characters from Tai-Pan. Noble House was the first of the "interlocking novels" he planned to write as part of the Asian Saga.

Clavell says he "wanted to write a story about two Americans who go Hong Kong to try and usurp Noble House and have a lot of adventures. That's all I knew I was going to do beforehand. In the old days—say, Tai-Pan—when I got myself in a hole I could always kill somebody. It wasn't that easy in Noble House."

He started in April 1978 but was interrupted by the filming of the novel Shōgun (1975). Clavell says Noble House took him three years to research and write. He would write every day, five pages a day. He used old newspapers and court records, as well as the research he had done for Tai Pan. The character Peter Marlowe was a surrogate for Clavell himself. Clavell said he made one of the American female characters Armenian because it was "the unexpected thing" and because his friend David Hedison was Armenian.

"I think it's one of the best things I've done", said Clavell in a 1980 interview. Clavell described his process:

All I do is write stories. It's very difficult to get people to read these days with television and the like. My intention is to entertain, perhaps illuminate. If I can transplant people into that buccaneering society of Hong Kong, 1963, maybe they'll get something out of it. If someone pays money for my book and feels satisfied, I'm doing my job... Writing is rewriting... writing is thinking... If you're lucky, you can start dreaming about a book, and if you're very lucky, you want to wake up... My attitude is positive, romantic. I write about men and women who like men and women. I don't write about psychiatric things, like finding the eternal answer to what is life.

The novel was 1,200 pages. It had been reduced by 30% with the help of Clavell's editor, Jena Bernkopf. "These things go on until they end", said Clavell about the length. "My secret is I never know what's going to happen from day to day. The last page is all that matters. The rest of it is wind. I only know that once I start, I will finish... People now tell me it ends too soon."

Clavell dedicated the novel to Queen Elizabeth II because "she owns Hong Kong. It belongs to the Queen of England and she has my admiration. You see I was born in the heyday of the British Empire and it's with me forever." Clavell said any film adaptation of the novel "needn't be set in 1963. Modern day Hong Kong will do. As De Mille said, a tree is a tree, a jet is a jet." The novel retroactively connects an obscure western movie Clavell wrote and directed to the Asian Saga. The film, Walk Like a Dragon (1960), starred Jack Lord as Linc Bartlett, who is established as an ancestor of a similarly named character in Clavell's novel.

== Reception ==
The initial print run of 250,000 copies of Noble House was the largest in the 17-year history of Delacorte Press. The initial order of 75,000 copies by Waldenbooks was a record for that chain.

Alvin Rabushka of the Hoover Institution said that the novel so well depicted Hong Kong that non-experts would not notice its accuracy.
