= Whirlwind (novel) =

1986 novel by James Clavell

- First edition (UK)
- Author: James Clavell
- Language: English
- Series: Asian Saga
- Genre: Historical novel
- Publisher: Hodder & Stoughton (UK); William Morrow (US)
- Publication date: 1986
- Publication place: United Kingdom, United States, Australia and Canada
- Media type: Print (Hardback & Paperback)
- Pages: 1,147 (hardback edition)
- ISBN: 0-7715-9589-1 (hardback edition)
- OCLC: 16052427
- Preceded by: Noble House
- Followed by: Escape

Whirlwind is a novel by James Clavell, first published in 1986. It forms part of the Asian Saga and is chronologically the last book in the series.

Set in Iran in early 1979, it follows the fortunes of a group of Struan's helicopter pilots, Iranian officials and oil men and their families in the turmoil surrounding the fall of the Iranian monarchy and the rise of the Ayatollah Khomeini. Like many of Clavell's novels, it is very long and is composed of many interweaving plot strands involving a large cast of characters, as well as a detailed portrayal of Iranian culture.

The novel is closely inspired by the true struggle of Bristow Helicopters to escape the revolutionary forces and get their employees and equipment out of the unstable, deteriorating situation in the region. Alan Bristow, chairman of Bristow Helicopters, commissioned a journalist, Jackie Griffin, who was married to one of his employees, to write a report on the events in Iran. Bristow then gave his friend, James Clavell, the resulting script to form the basis of the novel. Much of the story mirrors these and other contemporary events. In February 1979, U.S. Ambassador Adolph "Spike" Dubs was murdered in Kabul after Afghan security forces burst in on his kidnappers, the actual event both mentioned and fictionalized into the plot of Whirlwind. Other companies operating in Iran faced similar dilemmas. For example, Ross Perot's Electronic Data Systems similarly became very involved in the rescue of two executives from prison in Tehran, events related in Ken Follett's book On Wings of Eagles.

== Backstory ==
When tai-pan Ian Dunross learned in Noble House that the North Sea may soon be wide open for oil exploration, he sent Andrew Gavallan to Scotland to quietly buy up real estate in Aberdeen so they would be positioned to take advantage of this trend. The North Sea oil rigs, once built, are serviced by helicopter, which leads to Gavallan being involved in the helicopter and oil services industries. These become main business ventures of Struan's in Iran during the 1970s, as depicted in Whirlwind.

== Plot summary ==
Gavallan, based in Scotland, runs S-G Helicopter company operating in Iran during the Shah's reign. When Khomeini comes to power, Gavallan must get his pilots and their families, and his valuable helicopters, and the spare parts for the helicopters (of equal or greater value than the aircraft) out of the riot-torn country. Complicating matters is his power struggle with his company's secret owner, the Noble House of Hong Kong. The pilots' escape efforts form the basic story and the action sweeps across many lives: lovers, spies, fanatics, revolutionaries, friends and betrayers. British, French, Finnish, American, Canadian, Australian and Iranian are all caught up in a deadly religious and political upheaval, portraying the chilling and bewildering encounters when Westernized lifestyle clashes with harsh ancient traditions.

=== Equipment ===
Aircraft used by S-G Helicopters throughout the story include the Bell 212, Bell 206, and Aérospatiale Alouette III helicopters and the British Aerospace BAe 125 business jet.

=== Locations ===
The settings for the story are the western and southwestern parts of Iran, as well as neighboring Persian Gulf states, Turkey to Lake Van, and the environs of Aberdeen, Scotland.

Actual locations within Iran include Tehran (including Qasr Prison, Evin Prison, Galeg Morghi, and Doshan Tappeh Air Base), Tabriz, Qazvin, Mount Sabalan, the Zagros Mountains, Lengeh, Bandar Delam, Siri, the Dez Dam and Kharg island.

Fictional locations include the city of Kowiss, Yazdek village and the safe haven emirate of Al-Shargaz, meaning protector.

== Main characters ==
- Robert Armstrong: MI6 officer, appeared in earlier Noble House as a police inspector in Hong Kong, he was promoted to Special Intelligence, concerned with counter-espionage.
- Freddy Ayre: ex-Royal Air Force helicopter pilot based at Kowiss
- Marc Dubois: French helicopter pilot based at Bandar Delam
- Kuram "Hotshot" Esvandiary: IranOil station manager based at Kowiss.
- Colonel Hashemi Fazir: deputy chief of Inner Intelligence.
- Andrew Gavallan: member of Struans' inner court, brother-in-law of Ian Dunross, appeared in earlier Noble House. Gavallan is an aspirant to the office of tai-pan. He was married to Dunross' late sister Kathren. In Noble House, Gavallan worked in Hong Kong with the other members of the inner court. Gavallan later plotted with Dunross to force current tai-pan Linbar Struan into early retirement and hinted at having his son Scot take over the corporation.
- Scot Gavallan: helicopter pilot based at Zagros Three, son of Andrew Gavallan. Prospective future tai-pan.
- Yoshi Kasigi: Toda Shipping Industries executive and sometime ally to the Struan corporation.
- Abdollah Khan: father of Azadeh Yokkonen, head of Gorgon clan, leader in Iranian Azerbaijan playing both sides.
- Hakim Khan: brother of Azadeh Yokkonen, son of Abdollah Khan, later leader in Iranian Azerbaijan. He became ruthless and devious with his appointment to the position of authority in Tabriz.
- Nitchak Khan: Qashqai Kalandar of Yazdek village in Zagros neighborhood.
- Hussain Kowissi: mullah, town of Kowiss.
- Ibrahim Kyabi: university student-turned-leftist.
- Nathaniel "Nogger" Lane: helicopter pilot based at Tehran
- Sharazad (Bakravan) Lochart : Iranian wife of Tom Lochart.
- ۞Tom Lochart: Canadian senior helicopter pilot based at Zagros Three, husband of Sharazad.
- ۞Rudiger "Rudi" Lutz: German senior helicopter pilot based at Bandar Delam
- ۞Duncan MacIver: medically grounded senior helicopter pilot, managing director of S-G Helicopter operations office in Teheran, appeared in earlier Noble House.
- Genevere "Genny" McIver: wife of Duncan MacIver
- Colonel Karim Peshadi: Imperial Iranian Air Force, cousin of Sharazad, Shah-loyalist military commander of Kowiss Air Base, Hero of Dhofar and uncle of Sharazad, possibly based on Nader Jahanbani.
- Sandor "Sandy" Petrofi: Hungarian American helicopter pilot based at Kowiss.
- Charlie Pettikin: helicopter pilot based at Tehran, Vietnam vet with Duke Starke.
- Fedor Rakoczy: alias Dimitri Yazernov/alias Ali Bin Hassan Karakose/real name Igor Mzytryk, KGB agitator, son of Petr Oleg Mzytryk.
- John Ross: Gurkha captain sent to destroy abandoned CIA listening posts.
- ۞Harry "Scrag" Scragger, DFC and bar, AFC and bar. Oldest S-G pilot, senior helicopter pilot based at Lengeh.
- Jean-Luc Sessonne: French helicopter pilot based at Zagros Three.
- ۞Conroe "Duke" Starke: American senior helicopter pilot based at Kowiss, Vietnam vet with Charlie Pettikin.
- Manuela Starke: wife of "Duke" Starke
- George Talbot: United Kingdom Embassy Tehran MI6 Station Chief.
- General Valik: chairman of IHC (Iran Helicopters Company, enforced partners of S-G Helicopters) and uncle of Sharazad.
- Sergeant Wazari: Iranian air traffic control based at Kowiss.
- Azadeh (Gorgon) Yokkonen: Iranian wife of Erikki Yokkonen.
- ۞Erikki Yokkonen: Finnish helicopter pilot based at Tabriz.
- Zataki: leader of Kowiss komiteh (Islamic Revolution Committee).

۞ indicates leader of respective base

== Minor characters ==
- Ali Abbasi: Iranian helicopter pilot of General Valik.
- General Hassan Aryani: Imperial Iranian Air Force, killed in a hang-gliding accident in 1975; based on HE General Mohammad Amir Khatami, CVO (1920–1975), Chief of Staff of the Imperial Iranian Air Force who served as Chief Pilot to the Shah and was married to one of his sisters, HIH Fatimeh Pahlavi (1928–1987)
- Jared Bakravan: father of Sharazad.
- Sheik Bayazid: tribal leader, kidnapper of Erikki Yokkonen.
- General Beni-Hassan: national IranOil liaison.
- Sayada Bertolin: mistress of Jean-Luc Sessonne, secret Palestine Liberation Organization agent.
- Major Changiz: Shah-loyalist military officer based at Kowiss, second-in-command to Colonel Peshadi.
- Elizabeth "Liz" Chen: Scotland-based secretary to Andrew Gavallan.
- Paul "Profitable" Choy: the richest and most powerful Chinese businessman in Hong Kong, adversary to Andrew Gavallan, ally to Linbar Struan and witness to the death of David MacStruan. He was likely the mastermind of Linbar's sinister plots.
- Georges de Plessey: French chief EPF official
- Marc Dubois: French helicopter pilot based at Bandar Delam
- Ian Dunross: retired tai-pan of Struan's, protagonist and behind-the-scenes supporter of Gavallan, major character of Noble House
- Ahmed Dursak: Turcoman advisor to Abdollah Khan and later to Hakim Khan.
- Pietro Fiere: Italian second in command at Rig Bellissima in the Zagros
- Maureen Gavallan: wife of Andrew Gavallan
- Paula Giancani: Alitalia stewardess
- Sergeant Gueng: Gurkha sent to destroy abandoned CIA listening posts.
- Mario Guineppa: manager at Rig Bellissima in the Zagros.
- Henley: MI6 liaison based at Tabriz
- John Hogg: senior S-G fixed wing pilot
- Major Abdul Ikail: Turkish police officer
- Hideyoshi Ishida: Iran-Toda engineer
- Jahan: radio operator at Bandar Delam
- Fowler Joines: helicopter mechanic based at Kowiss
- "Effer" Jordon: Australian helicopter mechanic based at Zagros Three
- Ignatius "Pop" Kelly: helicopter pilot based at Kowiss.
- Yusuf Kyabi: IranOil senior area manager based at Ahwaz.
- Colonel General Petr Oleg Mzytryk: alias Gregor Suslev, KGB Colonel General who appeared in earlier Noble House.
- Nasiri: Zagros base manager.
- Willi Neuchtrichter: German helicopter pilot based at Lengeh.
- Numir: new site director at Bandar Delam.
- Doctor Nutt: S-G company doctor based at Kowiss.
- Abrim Pahmudi: newly appointed SAVAMA head. Based on Hossein Fardoust
- Emir Paknouri: first husband of Sharazad, goldsmith.
- Ali Pash: radio operator at Lengeh.
- Pavoud: Iranian chief clerk based at Kowiss.
- Sergeant Qeshemi: police officer at Lengeh.
- "Rod" Rodrigues: American helicopter mechanic based at Zagros Three.
- Vien Rosemont: CIA officer.
- Mimmo Sera: Italian company man based at Rig Rosa in the Zagros.
- Sir Percy Smedley-Taylor: director of Struan's Holdings, MP, appeared in earlier King Rat.
- Linbar Struan: Twelfth tai-pan of Struan's, who assumed that office in 1975 following the ostensibly accidental death of his predecessor David MacStruan. Prior to this, in Noble House, he was a member of Struan's inner court and an aspirant to the office of tai-pan.
- Sergeant Tenzing: Gurkha sent to destroy abandoned CIA listening posts.
- Hiro Toda: tai-pan of Iran-Toda Shipping joint partnership, appeared in earlier Noble House
- Massil Tugul: Palestinian air traffic control tower operator based at Kowiss.
- Jon Tyrer: American helicopter pilot, second-in-command based at Bandar Delam.
- Ed Vossi: helicopter pilot based at Lengeh.
- Watanabe: chief engineer of Iran-Toda Shipping joint partnership.
- Suliman al Wiali: Syrian assassin and head Group Four intelligence agent.

== Writing ==
Clavell got the idea for a book in 1975 when he visited Iran for the first time. He felt it had the potential to become "a country that seemed likely to become the No. 3 power in the world." Clavell:

I toured the country in a helicopter with an old friend of mine who was in the oil business. We went everywhere. I saw how helicopters and an international team of pilots were essential to the oil industry. Immediately, I knew it lent itself to a novel. But I had other projects going so I put it aside. Then the revolution occurred. Now there were all these stories about the horrors of living through someone else's revolution. It all came together in my mind as the story of a multinational group of copter pilots caught up in an ugly revolution. Of course, that's all I knew. I never have a plan before I begin a novel.

Clavell was completing Noble House at the time and was preparing to start a sequel to Shogun called Nippon (which became Gai-Jin). But at his wife's urging he put that work on the back burner and took up the Iran book. He says he never told his publisher he had switched topics.

They all continued to think I was writing a book about Japan. I never liked anyone to know what I'm doing. It's self-defense. When I was writing 'Shogun,' my publisher was asked at a sales meeting what Clavell was working on and when he said 'A book about 17th Century Japan,' they all roared 'Who the hell's interested in THAT?' If I told them I was writing about Iran, they'd say, 'Oh, another book on the hostage crisis.' But it's not. It's an adventure story that will hopefully tell people a lot they didn't know about the motivations of Moslem fundamentalists.

Clavell spent four years researching and writing the book. Clavell:

I learned to fly a helicopter. I read the Koran for the second time (the first was as a POW), I read anything the Shah had written, anything by his sister, by Khomaini. I read about the cults, about Sufism and 100 other books, about the Caucasus, the war years, the partition of Iran between Russia and Britain, I read about Ali, the first of the Imams.

Whirlwind was written in the alpine country around the Swiss resort of Gstaad, and in the south of France, where Clavell lived. He started writing in 1982 and finished it in late 1985.

Clavell auctioned off the rights to the novel after having written only 200 pages. He was paid $5 million, a record amount at the time.

== Escape: The Love Story from Whirlwind ==
A much shorter version of the story, focusing on a single pair of characters (Erikki Yokkonen and his wife Azadeh), was published in 1994 as Escape: The Love Story from Whirlwind. It is 598 pages long in paperback edition. The back cover of the first edition bore a message from the author humorously dedicating the book to anyone who had ever complained that his books were too heavy. Escape also includes story details not included in Whirlwind. Hard to find for many years, it returned to circulation when Clavell's Asian Saga was republished in 2016.
