= Georges-Alain Vuille =

Swiss film producer (1948–1999)

Georges-Alain Vuille (1948–99) was a Swiss film producer.

In the late 1970s he tried to finance a film version of the James Clavell novel Tai-Pan.

== Filmography ==
- Ashanti (1979) - producer
- Womanlight (1979) - producer
- The Favorite (1989) - producer
