= The Children's Story =

1964 short story by James Clavell

- First edition
- Author: James Clavell
- Language: English
- Genre: Science fiction, dystopian fiction
- Publisher: Delacorte Press
- Publication date: 1981 (written 1963)
- Publication place: United States
- Media type: Print (hardback & paperback)
- Pages: 85
- ISBN: 0440204682

"The Children's Story" is a 4,300-word dystopian fiction short story by James Clavell. It first appeared in the Ladies' Home Journal October 1963 issue, and was printed in book form in 1981. It was adapted by Clavell into a thirty-minute short film for television which aired on Mobil Showcase.

== Plot summary ==
The story takes place in an American classroom full of seven-year-old children, after the US has been defeated and occupied by an unspecified country. The story opens with the previous teacher leaving the classroom, having been removed from her position and replaced with an agent of the foreign power.

The new teacher makes an immediate good impression with her pretty face, friendly demeanor, lack of an accent, beautiful singing voice, and the fact that she'd already memorized the children's names by studying from a chart. Only one child, Johnny, is hostile to her, as his father has been arrested and placed in a detention camp.

The children first attempt to recite the Pledge of Allegiance, but the new teacher questions them and exposes the fact that they do not understand its meaning or even many of the words. She convinces them that the Pledge is pointless and to cut up the classroom's flag to each keep a piece. The children throw the flagpole out the window for fun.

The children ask the teacher several questions, which she answers using propaganda techniques and relentless optimism about the change. She tells Johnny that the detention camp is like a school for adults and that he'll be allowed to visit his father in a few days.

The teacher asks the children to pray to God for candy, which does not come. She then suggests they pray to "Our Leader" for candy, and while the children's eyes are shut, quietly puts candy on the desks. Johnny, who had opened his eyes, calls her out. The teacher claims she did this to show that prayer does not work, that only humans can give each other rewards and that she and the regime will reward the children if they behave well. She awards Johnny a position of authority in the class, which placates him and he commits himself to not accepting "wrong thoughts".

The story ends with the teacher contemplating the fact that all throughout the country, children and adults are being indoctrinated. She has only been in the classroom for twenty-five minutes.

== Background ==
The story touches on concepts such as freedom, religion and patriotism.

Yukio Aoshima, who translated this novel into Japanese, suggests it follows on to La Dernière Classe (The Last Class) in Contes du Lundi (1873) by Alphonse Daudet. This short story tells of the last schoolday of a French teacher who is about to flee Alsace after a German conquest.

Clavell wrote this story after a talk with his six-year-old daughter, who had just returned home from school. His daughter, Michaela, was explaining how she had learned the Pledge of Allegiance and he was struck by the thought that, though she had memorized the pledge, she had no idea what many of the words meant.

Clavell finishes by writing:

During that day I asked all kinds of people of every age, "You know the 'I pledge allegiance...'", but before I could finish, at once they would all parrot it, the words almost always equally blurred. In every case, I discovered that not one teacher, ever — or anyone — had ever explained the words to any one of them. Everyone just had to learn it to say it. The Children's Story came into being that day. It was then that I realized how completely vulnerable my child's mind was — any mind for that matter — under controlled circumstances. Normally I write and rewrite and re-rewrite, but this story came quickly — almost by itself. Barely three words were changed. It pleases me greatly because it keeps asking me questions... Questions like what's the use of "I pledge allegiance" without understanding? Like why is it so easy to divert thoughts and implant others? Like what is freedom and why is it so hard to explain? The Children's Story keeps asking me all sorts of questions I cannot answer. Perhaps you can — then your children will...

== Television adaptation ==
The short story was adapted in 1982 as an installment in the anthology TV series Mobil Showcase. Clavell's daughter (the above-referenced Michaela, known professionally as Michaela Ross during her acting career) played a seemingly pleasant young teacher sent to indoctrinate a classroom of American children. She replaces an old teacher (Mildred Dunnock in her penultimate performance), who disappears after the students witness her crying.

== In popular culture ==
A copy of the novel was a central plot point in the first issue of Karate Kommandos, a Marvel Comics comic book adaption of a media property starring Chuck Norris. The fictionalized Norris extolled the virtues of the book after using it to stop a bullet, which compelled his young ward Too-Much to work on his book report on it.

== See also ==
- Cultural Revolution
