= Alasdair Morrison (banker) =

British banker

Alasdair Morrison (born 1948) is a Hong Kong businessman.

== Early life ==
Morrison was born in Scotland in 1948 and educated at Eton and Cambridge, the son of a former Church of Scotland British Army chaplain.

== Career ==
He joined Jardines in 1971 as a management trainee selling cargo space. He was promoted to general manager of Jardine Industries in 1975. In 1980, he became a general manager for Jardines Philippines. Morrison was appointed a general manager based in Europe in 1982 and appointed an assistant director based in Hong Kong in 1983. He became a member of the Asia Pacific Regional Board in 1987 and became managing director of property giant Hongkong Land in 1988. In 1994, Morrison succeeded Nigel Rich as managing director or quaintly known as 'tai-pan', of Jardine Matheson Holdings.

As 'tai-pan' of Jardines, he presided over the delisting of the company from the Hong Kong stock exchange, Hang Seng Index. Though this period saw a very difficult time for the company with its relationship with the Chinese Government, Morrison played a role in efforts to reestablish Jardines' ties with the Chinese government by publicly apologising for some of the company's past actions during the early part of his tenure as managing director and frequently visiting Chinese officials in Beijing. He initiated internal structural and procedural changes within Jardine Matheson Holdings. During his tenure, Morrison managed the company through the 1997 Asian financial crisis and the subsequent recession.

Morrison resigned from the company in 2000 and was replaced by Percy Weatherall, a relative of one of the controlling families. Morrison was then courted by several companies based in Asia but decided to join investment banking giant Morgan Stanley as its chairman and CEO for Asia. He was the chairman of the company, having relinquished the CEO position in 2006 and retired as chairman on 8 March 2007. From 2010 to January 2015, Morrison was a senior adviser to Citigroup Asia based in Hong Kong. He later served as a director of Pacific Basin Shipping Ltd.
