= James Clavell's Shōgun =

1989 interactive fiction game

- Developer: Infocom
- Publisher: Infocom
- Designer: Dave Lebling
- Artist: Donald Langosy
- Engine: Z-machine
- Platforms: Amiga, Apple II, MS-DOS, Mac
- Release: Mac; March 14, 1989; Amiga; March 21, 1989; Apple II; May 10, 1989; MS-DOS; July 6, 1989
- Genres: Interactive fiction, adventure
- Mode: Single-player

James Clavell's Shōgun is a graphic and text adventure game written by Dave Lebling game and published by Infocom in 1989. It was released for the Amiga, Apple II, MS-DOS, and Mac. The game is based on the 1975 novel Shōgun by James Clavell. It was Infocom's thirty-third game.

== Plot ==
The game reproduces many of the novel's scenes, few of which are interconnected in any way. The player assumes the role of John Blackthorne, pilot-major of the Dutch trading ship Erasmus. During a voyage in the Pacific Ocean in the year 1600, the Erasmus is shipwrecked in Japan. Blackthorne must survive in a land where every custom is as unfamiliar to him as the language. After learning some of the society's ways, he is drawn into a political struggle between warlords and falls in love with a Japanese woman. Eventually, he embraces Japanese life and is honored as a samurai.

== Development ==
James Clavell contributed little to the design of the game, although he and Dave Lebling met several times. He treated the game as a traditional licensing agreement rather than a collaboration. Consequently, the game contains many scenes from the novel presented verbatim or made thinly interactive.

Dave Lebling has said that he considers Shōgun the worst game he was ever responsible for overall, although he is proud of several of the timing puzzles.

== Release ==
The Shōgun packaging includes two physical objects: a map representing John Blackthorne's "known world" of 1600, and The Soul of the Samurai, a booklet describing the history and significance of samurai swords.

== Reception ==
Dave Arneson gave Shōgun a negative review in Computer Gaming World. He wrote that the linear nature of the game and poor hints contributed to guess-the-verb and trial-and-error gameplay, and that the illustrations—while "nice to look at"—did not provide information to play the game. Arneson praised the game's large size, but concluded that Shōgun was only "mildly interesting" and inferior to Zork Zero.

Dave Morris reviewed James Clavell's Shōgun for Games International magazine, and gave it 1 star out of 5, and stated that "I would rather have seen this game taking the novel as a springboard for much more open adventure possibilities. As it stands, I can't see who could get anything out of it. Except Infocom and James Clavell, that is."
