= Tai-Pan (novel) =

1966 historical novel by James Clavell

- Later edition
- Author: James Clavell
- Language: English
- Series: Asian Saga
- Genre: Historical fiction, novel
- Publisher: Atheneum
- Publication date: May 16, 1966
- Publication place: United Kingdom, United States
- Media type: Print (hardback and paperback)
- Pages: 727
- Preceded by: Shōgun (in chronology of Asian Saga)
- Followed by: Gai-Jin

Tai-Pan is a 1966 novel written by James Clavell about European and American traders who move into Hong Kong in 1842, following the end of the First Opium War. It is the second book in Clavell's Asian Saga, and the first to include the fictional Struan family. At its heart is the conflict between Dirk Struan and Tyler Brock.

== Plot summary ==
The novel begins following the British victory of the first Opium War and the seizure of Hong Kong. Although the island is largely uninhabited and the terrain unfriendly, it has a large natural harbour that both the British government and various trading companies believe will be useful for the import of merchandise to be traded in mainland China, a highly lucrative market.

In 1805, at the age of seven, Dirk Struan began his nautical adventures as a powder monkey on a king's ship at the Battle of Trafalgar and he remains bound to the sea for life. By the end of this year, he found service on the East India Company merchant ship Vagrant Star to China. Under the command of Tyler Brock, third mate and future nemesis, Dirk Struan was whipped mercilessly. Dirk Struan vowed to someday destroy Brock. Later, Dirk Struan and Tyler Brock would go on to dominate the opium trade.

In 1812 a fateful night in the Malacca Strait, Vagrant Star ran aground on a reef and sank. At the age of fourteen, Struan swam ashore and found his way to Singapore. Later, Dirk Struan discovered that Tyler Brock survived as well.

By 1822, Dirk Struan was a captain-owner of his own ship on the opium run. Tyler Brock was his chief rival. Also this year, Dirk Struan married Ronalda in Scotland, but immediately travelled to Macau.

In 1824, Culum Struan was born. He was the son of Dirk Struan and Ronalda. Shortly after his birth, Ronalda and Culum were sent to Glasgow. Ronalda would never return to China. Also this year, Gordon Chen was born. He was the illegitimate son of Dirk Struan and his mistress, Chen Kai Sung.

In 1826, the British East India Company decided to make an example of Struan and Brock. The Company withdrew their licenses and the two men were financially wiped out. Brock was left with his ship, Struan with nothing. Brock entered a secret agreement with another opium trader. Dirk Struan pilfered a lorcha from pirates in Macau. He became a clandestine opium smuggler for other China traders. He relentlessly confiscated more pirate ships. Using them to make dangerous illicit opium runs up the China coast, he made even greater profits.

In 1834, free trade reform advocates succeeded in ending the monopoly of the British East India Company under the Charter Act 1833. Finally, British trade opened to private entrepreneurs. With the freedom to legally trade, Dirk Struan and Tyler Brock became merchant princes. Their armed fleets expanded and bitter rivalry honed their enmity even keener.

In 1837, Jin-qua arranged for May–May, his favourite granddaughter, to become Dirk Struan's mistress. She was secretly assigned the task of teaching "the green-eyed devil" Struan "civilised" (Chinese) ways.

By 1838, Dirk Struan was considered the Tai-pan of all tai-pan. Struan & Company was recognised as the Noble House. Business concerns of the Noble House included smuggling opium from India into China, trading spices and sugar from the Philippines, importing Chinese tea and silk into England, handling cargo papers, cargo insurance, renting of dockyard facilities and warehouse space, trade financing, and other numerous lines of business and trade. The company possessed nineteen intercontinental clipper ships. A close rival, Brock & Sons Trading Company, possessed thirteen. Additionally, Struan & Company possessed hundreds of small ships and lorchas for upriver coastal smuggling.

By 1839, Gordon Chen grew to become a remarkably intelligent and a very skilled businessman. However, he longed for recognition from his biological father, Dirk Struan. To achieve this, he decided to become indispensable to Dirk Struan and the Noble House.

From January to July 1841, events detailed in the novel unfold.

The Noble House was on the brink of financial collapse and about to be destroyed by rival Tyler Brock. In desperation and upon prompting by Mary Sinclair, Dirk Struan turned to Jin Qua. In exchange for a series of favours and promises, Dirk Struan received a loan of "4 million" (approximately £1 million) in silver bullion from the Jin Qua.

The first part of the arrangement, Struan agreed to certain trade concessions. The second part of the arrangement, Struan agreed that a member of the Chen family would forever be comprador of the Noble House. The third part of the arrangement, Struan agreed to sell Jin Qua a sizeable plot of land in Hong Kong with the deed to be recorded in the name of Gordon Chen.

The fourth part of the arrangement, Struan agreed to the "coin debt". Four bronze coins were split irregularly in half, each coin different from the other three. Four halves were given to Dirk Struan and the other four halves were kept by Jin Qua. Anyone who presented a half-coin to the tai-pan of the Noble House must be granted whatever he asked, whether legal or illegal. All future tai-pan of the Noble House must swear to keep this bargain. This served as repayment for the loan of silver.

Tess Brock and Culum Struan fell in love and married. The couple condemned their fathers' hatred for each other.

Due to the bargain struck between Dirk Struan and Jin Qua, Gordon Chen managed Jin Qua's financial interests in Hong Kong, investing in land and money lending. Gordon Chen seized leadership of the Hong Kong triad. Partly due to assistance from his father and partly due to running protection rackets, Gordon Chen quickly became the wealthiest Chinese man in Hong Kong. Gordon Chen concealed this information from his father. When his status as Dragon Head of the triad was revealed, his position was nearly ruined. Fortunately, facts were dismissed as lies. Although, Dirk Struan was not entirely convinced.

As part of his efforts to protect his father, Gordon Chen arranged the assassination of Gorth Brock and sought a cure for May–May's malaria. The first half-coin of Jin Qua was presented to Dirk Struan by the pirate warlord Wu Fang Choi.

On 21 July 1841, Dirk Struan was killed in a typhoon before he can fulfil his oath to destroy Brock. Culum Struan became the second tai-pan of the Noble House. Gordon Chen began placing spies on Struan & Company's ships. Gordon Chen raised Duncan and Kate Struan, the children of Dirk Struan and May–May.

The enmity between Struan and Brock is a prominent theme in Clavell's Asian Saga. Dirk Struan and Tyler Brock left many children, legitimate and illegitimate, who take up their respective fathers' mantles and continue the battle. Thus begins a vicious cycle which lasts many years. Tess Brock Struan takes control of the Noble House after the death of Culum Struan and brings about the personal bankruptcy and death of her father but the battle between the two companies continues for several more generations. The last descendant of Tyler Brock, Quillan Gornt, dies in a boating accident over 120 years later. After this accident there is no one from the Brock line left to threaten the Noble House.

The romance between Dirk and his Chinese mistress, May-may, developed within the conventions of the genre as a basis for the novel's optimistic theme of cross-cultural fusion. Dirk Struan has several children who feature in the story, including Culum Struan, Gordon Chen, Winifred Dunross Struan, Duncan Struan, and Kate Struan.

Clavell's hero was inspired by the historical William Jardine, and the Noble House of Struan's is modelled on the real-life "Princely House" of Jardine, Matheson & Company of Hong Kong.

== List of other characters ==
Although the novel features many characters, it is Dirk Struan and Tyler Brock, former shipmates and the owners of two massive (fictional) trading companies who are the main focal points of the story. Their rocky and often abusive relationship as seamen initiated an intense amount of competitive tension. Throughout the novel, both men seek to destroy each other in matters of business and personal affairs. Struan is referred to throughout the novel as the Tai-pan, indicating his position as head of Struan & Company, the greatest private trading company in nineteenth-century Asia. Clavell translates tai-pan as "Supreme Leader".

Other important characters of the novel include:

- Culum Struan – Dirk Struan's son and future tai-pan
- Robb Struan – Dirk Struan's half-brother and business partner
- William Longstaff – first Governor of Hong Kong (based on Charles Elliot)
- Jeff Cooper – American trader and secret partner to the Noble House
- Wilf Tillman – American trader and partner to Jeff Cooper. Guardian to Shevaun Tillman. Advocate of slavery.
- Archduke Zergeyev – Russian diplomat and spy to gauge British influence in Hong Kong
- Gorth Brock – Tyler Brock's boat-captain son
- Jin-qua – Chinese tea and opium trader, lends Dirk Struan "4 million" (approximately 1 million pounds sterling in silver bullion) to get out of debt to Tyler Brock. He is the originator of the "coin debt" to which Dirk Struan and future tai-pans of the Noble House must swear to uphold (revealed as well in Noble House).
- May–May – Dirk Struan's Chinese mistress, granddaughter of Jin-qua, instructed to teach Dirk "civilised" (Chinese) ways
- Liza Brock – wife of Tyler Brock and Tess's mother
- Aristotle Quance – painter and hedonist, always in debt. The Struan family own several of his paintings.
- Shevaun Tillman – ward of Wilf Tillman and hopeful bride to Dirk Struan
- Captain Orlov – "The Hunchback" Norwegian opium ship captain under Dirk Struan. Often has visions of precognition of future events.
- Morley Skinner – editor of the island newspaper, privy to secrets handed to him by Dirk Struan to keep his rivals off balance
- Gordon Chen – Dirk Struan's Eurasian son by a Chinese mistress and secret head of the first Hong Kong triad
- Tess Brock – daughter of Tyler Brock and eventual wife of Culum Struan. Also known as Hag Struan in later novels.
- Mary Sinclair – secret English prostitute and devotee/spy of Dirk Struan, and sister of Horatio Sinclair
- Captain Glessing – former ship captain of the Royal Navy and harbour master. Has a peninsula named after him. Loses an arm in the typhoon.
- Horatio Sinclair – clerk to William Longstaff, church fanatic and harbours incestuous desires for his sister Mary. (Based on John Robert Morrison)
- Wolfgang Mauss – renegade priest and teacher to Gordon Chen (based on Karl Gützlaff)
- Roger Blore – gambler, makes an unheard of record time journey to Hong Kong, later becomes Dirk Struan's horse racing club owner
- Captain Scragger – pirate and negotiator for Wu Fang Choi, the pirate king. Scragger's family line is mentioned several times in succeeding books of the Asian Saga.
- Wu Fang Choi – pirate king and secret partner to Jin-qua, as the bullion for the deal came from him

== Background ==
Clavell had written one novel, the autobiographical King Rat. He was challenged to write a second book because "that separates the men from the boys". He said he wanted to write a book which did for Hong Kong what James Michener's Hawaii did for that state. "The movie sale money for King Rat gave me the drop dead money I needed to write Tai Pan," said Clavell. (He later said this was $157,000 spread over five years for tax purposes.)

After visiting Hong Kong with Benson Fong in 1962, Clavell returned in 1963 with his family for a year. He said it took him five false starts, 241 days to write a first draft, and 12 weeks to do the second. Clavell originally wanted the novel to span from the establishment of Hong Kong until the present day but when writing it decided to end the novel on the death of the first tai pan. He did so much research it gave him the idea to write a trilogy; in particular he later wrote a novel set in 1963 Hong Kong, Noble House.

German Gollob was Clavell's editor.

== Reception ==
The book was an immediate best-seller and film rights were sold to MGM and Filmways for $500,000. (Although it would take two decades for the film to be made). By 1976 the novel had sold over a million-and-a-half copies in paperback.

=== Critical reception ===
The New York Times said the book was not as notable as King Rat but was "almost an archetype of pure story telling... undoubtedly grand entertainment... hordes of readers will revel in Tai Pan."

== In film ==
Patrick McGoohan was announced to play Dirk Struan in a film version of Tai Pan in 1968 but this was never made due to budget issues. In the late 1970s Steve McQueen signed to play the role for a reported $10 million fee in an adaptation written by George MacDonald Fraser (who thought Sean Connery would have made ideal casting); however he later dropped out of the project; Roger Moore became briefly attached, but the movie was never made.

Eventually Australian actor Bryan Brown played Struan in the movie Tai Pan (1986), which was a box office flop.
