= Taipan (corporate title) =

Term for foreign-born businesspeople in China

A taipan (Chinese: 大班; pinyin: dà bān; Sidney Lau: daai^{6}baan^{1}, literally "top class"), sometimes spelled tai-pan, is a foreign-born senior business executive or entrepreneur operating in mainland China or Hong Kong. The term Taipan also refers to the mixed political, social, and business oligarch families in the Philippines.

== History ==
In the nineteenth and early twentieth centuries, taipans were foreign-born businessmen who headed large hong trading houses such as Jardine, Matheson & Co., Swire and Dent & Co., amongst others.

The first recorded use of the term in English is in the Canton Register of 28 October 1834. Historical variant spellings include taepan (first appearance) and typan.

== Politico-business oligarchs in the Philippines ==
Taipans also refer to the Chinese-Filipino business oligarchs and business families who own or have involvement in various businesses in the Philippines and are the powerful billionaire-founders of Chinese-Filipino business empires. Some of them are also able to control, gain ownership to either temporary or permanent and wholly or partially, and have involvement on Philippine politics and the country's other sectors like mass media, energy, electricity, and many more.

Examples of taipans are: Roberto Ongpin of Alphaland Corporation; the López family of Iloilo of Lopez Holdings Corporation (LPZ) and its owner and the family's private holding and investment entity Lopez, Inc. which includes the media company ABS-CBN Corporation, and its namesake content distribution network, divisions and subsidiaries and real estate properties; Sy family of SM Investments Corporation (SMIC) or SM Group and private concessionaire of the Philippine government-owned (under Department of Energy (DOE)) National Transmission Corporation (TransCo) and temporary owner of Philippine power grid structures or components both entirely new and secondhand and their exact lands or locations, and rights-of-ways (ROWs) or portions acquired and designated from January 15, 2009 National Grid Corporation of the Philippines (NGCP) through vice-chairman Henry T. Sy Jr. with the latter also along with Robert Coyiuto Jr.; Ramon Ang of San Miguel Corporation (SMC); Lucio Tan of Philippine Airlines (PAL); Tony Tan Caktiong of Jollibee Group; and Jacinto Ng of Republic Biscuit Corporation (Rebisco).

== In popular culture ==
The term gained wide currency outside China after the publication of Somerset Maugham's 1922 short story "The Taipan" and James Clavell's 1966 novel Tai-Pan, which was adapted into a 1986 film of the same name, directed by Daryl Duke.

Taipan! is a 1979 video game where the player is 19th-century trader who sails between several east Asian ports buying opium, silk and firearms to re-sell at higher prices.

The term was used to describe the protagonist's family in J. G. Ballard's 1984 novel Empire of the Sun.

== Notable taipans ==
- Anthony John Liddell Nightingale, Jardine Matheson (2006–2012), Hong Kong
- William Jardine, Jardine Matheson (1843–1845), Hong Kong
- James Matheson, Jardine Matheson (1796–1878), Hong Kong
- Lawrence Kadoorie, China Light and Power (1899–1993), Hong Kong
- Alasdair Morrison, Jardine Matheson (1994–2000), Hong Kong
- Simon Murray, Hutchison Whampoa (1984–1994), Hong Kong
- Percy Weatherall (born 1957), Jardine Matheson, Hong Kong
- William Keswick (1834–1912), Scotland
- Merlin Bingham Swire (born 1973), England
- Douglas Lapraik (1818–1869), England
- John Johnstone Paterson (1886–1971), Jardine Matheson, Hong Kong

== See also ==
- Canton System, the single-port trading monopoly operative in China prior to the First Opium War.
- Thirteen Factories
