= Shōgun (novel) =

1975 novel by James Clavell

- First edition cover (UK)
- Author: James Clavell
- Cover artist: Ed Vebell (illustrated edition only)
- Series: Asian Saga
- Genre: Historical fiction
- Publisher: Delacorte Press (US); Hodder & Stoughton (UK)
- Publication date: 1975
- Publication place: United Kingdom, United States
- Media type: Print (hardback and paperback)
- Pages: 1152 pp (first edition, paperback)
- ISBN: 0-440-08721-X (US) – ISBN 0-340-20316-1 (UK)
- OCLC: 9326267
- Dewey Decimal: 823/.914 19
- LC Class: PS3553.L365 S5 1975
- Followed by: Tai-Pan

Shōgun is a 1975 novel of historical fiction by author James Clavell that chronicles the end of Japan's Azuchi-Momoyama period (1568–1600) and the dawn of the Edo period (1603–1868). Loosely based on actual events and figures, Shōgun narrates how European interests and internal conflicts within Japan brought about the Shogunate restoration.

By 1980 six million copies of Shōgun had been sold worldwide. The novel has been adapted into two TV series (in 1980 and 2024), a stage production (Shōgun: The Musical), a board game, and three video games. Though its historical setting is the earliest, it is the third of six published books in Clavell's broader Asian Saga series.

== Premise ==
For nearly 30 years, Japan had been fractured by dynastic clashes and was without a Shogun (central ruler). Japan was also interfered with militarily and politically by Catholic Portugal in concert with the Roman Papacy and its Jesuits stationed in Japan and elsewhere in North East Asia. Their prime interests in Japan were to control trade with Europe and to propagate Roman Catholicism. Portugal had profited as Japan's exclusive European trading partner for more than 50 years, but it became uneasy when the newly arrived Protestant Dutch threatened their monopoly.

== Plot ==
The clandestine mission of the Dutch ship Erasmus was to compete with Portugal for Japan and the rest of the lucrative far East Asian trade. After much of its crew, including its captain, dies, it ends up marooned in Izu Harbor, the survivors thereby becoming the first Protestants to set foot in Japan.

The ship's crew is held captive while armaments, records and coin are seized by Izu's daimyō (lord) Yabu. Yabu had hoped to keep the ship a secret, but a spy reported the ship's arrival to his liege Toranaga, Lord of the Kantō and President of the Council of Regents. Toranaga has the ship's navigator John Blackthorne brought to him in Osaka, knowing that the Erasmus could be a source of advantages against Lord Ishido Kazunari, his chief rival in the council.

Toranaga's meeting with Blackthorne is faithfully translated by a Portuguese Jesuit, Father Martin Alvito, despite revelations of war between Catholic Portugal and Elizabethan England. Until then Toranaga was unaware that Christendom was so divided.

To sequester Blackthorne from the other regents, he is imprisoned with a Franciscan friar who teaches Blackthorne rudimentary Japanese and relates how the Jesuits' rōnin (mercenaries) invaded Japan and launched violent agitations to profit the Portuguese crown. Before the two Catholic regents, urged on by the Jesuits, can have him executed, Blackthorne is abducted in transit and returned to Toranaga.

Lady Toda Mariko (a Jesuit-educated Catholic loyal to Toranaga, not her church) faithfully translates to Toranaga Blackthorne's account of the Pope granting Portugal colonial rights to Japan and East Asia in return for replacement of all non-Catholic lords, including Toranaga, with those loyal to Portugal and Rome. He also relates the Franciscan's report of Catholic rōnin from Macau invading Japan.

Toranaga is taken aback and refuses Portugal's trading ship request to leave Japan. In turn the regents, after once again failing to assassinate Blackthorne, try to force Toranaga to commit seppuku. Instead he resigns from the council and flees Osaka. Aided by Blackthorne's clownish antics, he, Toranaga, Mariko and others of his court make it to Anjiro, which is safer. Toranaga elevates Blackthorne to the samurai rank of hatamoto and gifts him a consort, Fujiko.

In Anjiro, Blackthorne threatens to commit seppuku after Yabu says he will burn down the village if the Englishman doesn't learn Japanese fast enough. He is narrowly stopped by Omi. Slowly, Blackthorne's grasp of Japanese speech and customs improves. He trains a contingent of samurai in European-style warfare, and after a devastating earthquake, rescues Toranaga from underneath rubble. In turn Blackthorne raises his regard for Toranaga and for Mariko, a key member of Toranaga's inner circle, and with whom he secretly has an affair. A chance encounter with Blackthorne's old crew finds them revolted by his Japanese ways, and he by the coarseness of their European character.

To deflect suspicions, Toranaga feigns to all except Mariko acquiescence towards Ishido and professes no desire to do battle. When Toranaga's half-brother Zataki, who has allied with Ishido, arrives, Toranaga apparently surrenders and has Mariko re-enter Osaka with the intention to lay bare Ishido's holding of noble households hostage. When, as planned, Mariko tries to exit Osaka, Ishido's men violently block her party until an intentionally unharmed Mariko gives up on leaving. Saying she has been dishonored, Mariko vows to kill herself the next day. She almost ends her life, but in a delaying gambit, Ishido grants her leave at the last minute. That night Toranaga's duplicitous vassal Yabu lets Ishido's ninjas into Toranaga's compound to kidnap Mariko. Having retreated to a storeroom, Mariko willfully stands in front of a door set to explode and is killed. Her death, which Ishido sought to prevent, forces him to free his noble hostages, thus weakening military alliances. As Blackthorne and Yabu leave, the Jesuits inform the former that the Erasmus has been sunk. As for Yabu, he is caught out by Toranaga and obeys his lord's order to commit seppuku, giving his prized katana to Blackthorne. Mariko wills money to Blackthorne to build a seaworthy ship for Toranaga's navy.

At the book's end, Toranaga in soliloquy says he sank the Erasmus to form alliances with the Catholic lords, who in return agreed not to kill Blackthorne. Blackthorne's karma, Toranaga says, is to never leave Japan, as Mariko's karma was to die for her lord, and as Toranaga's is to become shogun. The book's epilogue takes place after the Battle of Sekigahara with Toranaga burying Ishido up to his neck until he dies three days later.

== Characters ==
Shogun is a work of historical fiction based upon the power struggle between the successors of Toyotomi Hideyoshi that led to the founding of the Tokugawa shogunate. Clavell based each character on a historical figure, but changed their names in order to add narrative deniability to the story.

- John "Anjin" Blackthorne – Miura Anjin (William Adams) (1564–1620)
- Yoshi Toranaga – Tokugawa Ieyasu (1543–1616)
- Yoshi Sudara – Tokugawa Hidetada (1579–1632)
- Yoshi Naga – Matsudaira Tadayoshi (1580–1607)
- Ishido Kazunari – Ishida Mitsunari (1559–1600)
- Ochiba – Yodo-dono (1569–1615)
- Nakamura Yaemon – Toyotomi Hideyori (1593–1615)
- Onoshi – Otani Yoshitsugu (1558–1600)
- Harima – Arima Harunobu (1567–1612)
- Kiyama – Konishi Yukinaga (1555–1600)
- Sugiyama – Maeda Toshiie (1539–1599)
- Zataki – Matsudaira Sadakatsu (1560–1624)
- Toda Mariko – Hosokawa Gracia (1563–1600)
- Toda Hiro-matsu 'Iron Fist' – Hosokawa Fujitaka (1534–1610)
- Toda Buntaro – Hosokawa Tadaoki (1563–1646)
- Toda Saruji – Hosokawa Tadatoshi (1586–1641)
- Kasigi Yabu – Honda Masanobu (1538–1616)
- Kasigi Omi – Honda Masazumi (1566–1637)
- Goroda – Oda Nobunaga (1534–1582)
- Taiko Nakamura – Toyotomi Hideyoshi (1536–1598)
- Akechi Jinsai – Akechi Mitsuhide (1528–1582)
- Lady Genjiko – Oeyo (1573–1626)
- Father Martin Alvito – João Rodrigues (1561/1562–1633/1634)
- Johann Vinck – Jan Joosten van Lodensteijn (1556?–1623)
- Spillbergen – Jacob Quaeckernaeck (?–1606)
- Father-Visitor Carlo dell'Acqua – Alessandro Valignano (1539–1606)
- Brother Joseph – Miguel Chijiwa (1569?–1633)
- Captain-General Ferriera – Horatio Neretti, captain of the Black Ship in 1600

== Historical accuracy ==
Blackthorne's interactions with Toranaga are closely based upon accounts in the diaries of William Adams (1564–1620). However, while Adams served in Tokugawa's army at Sekigahara, he did not become a retainer or a samurai until 1607, seven years after the battle.

Adams never met Hosokawa Gracia, in contrast to Blackthorne's intimate relationship with Toda Mariko.

The novel contains numerous Japanese language errors, as well as mistakenly depicting Japanese castles as having portcullises and 17th-century samurai as using socket bayonets. Carrier pigeons, used extensively by Toranaga, were unknown in Japan at the time.

== Background ==
Clavell was an officer in the Royal Artillery during World War II and was a prisoner of war at Changi Prison in Singapore from 1942 to 1945, an experience that formed the basis of his first novel King Rat. Despite this experience, he admired Japan and the Japanese people, and described Shogun as "passionately pro-Japanese."

Clavell stated that reading a sentence in his daughter's textbook that stated that "in 1600, an Englishman went to Japan and became a samurai" inspired the novel. Shogun was therefore based on an actual series of events involving William Adams, who reached Japan in 1600 and became involved with the future shogun Tokugawa. He achieved high status managing commercial activities for Tokugawa's shogunate, though much of the interaction between the various characters in the novel was invented. The first draft was 2,300 pages and Clavell cut it down to 1,700 with the help of his editor, German Gollob. However, Shogun was edited lightly in comparison to Clavell's earlier novels.

== Reception ==
The New York Times's Webster Schott wrote, "I can't remember when a novel has seized my mind like this one [...] It's almost impossible not to continue to read Shōgun once having opened it". In addition to becoming a best-seller, with more than six million copies of the novel in 14 hardcover and 38 paperback printings by 1980, Shōgun had great impact on westerners' knowledge of, and interest in, Japanese history and culture. Henry Smith, editor of Learning from Shōgun: Japanese History and Western Fantasy (1980), estimated that 20 to 50% of all students in American college-level courses about Japan had read the novel. He described the book as "a virtual encyclopedia of Japanese history and culture; somewhere among those half-million words, one can find a brief description of virtually everything one wanted to know about Japan", and stated that "In sheer quantity, Shōgun has probably conveyed more information about Japan to more people than all the combined writings of scholars, journalists, and novelists since the Pacific War". Criticizing inaccuracies in the author's depiction of Japan, Smith wrote in History Today that "Clavell is in effect delivering a sermon on the errant ways of the West", contrasting Blackthorne and other Christian Westerners' barbaric ways to the superior "meditative and fatalistic posture of the Japanese samurai". The author of James Clavell: A Critical Companion called the novel "one of the most effective depictions of cross-cultural encounters ever written", and "Clavell's finest effort".

Clavell said that Shōgun "is B.C. and A.D. It made me. I became a brand name, like Heinz Baked Beans." He reported that the ruler of a Middle Eastern petrostate offered him a full oil tanker for a novel that would do for his country what Shōgun did for Japan.

== Adaptations ==
=== Television ===
In 1976 Clavell employed Robert Bolt to write a screenplay. In 1978, he selected Eric Bercovici to write a miniseries for NBC. Clavell and Bercovici decided to simplify the story for an American television audience by omitting one of the two major plot lines of the novel, the struggle between Toranaga and the other warlords, and focusing on the adventures of Blackthorne and his romance with Mariko. Due to the focus on Blackthorne's perspective, most of the Japanese dialogue was not subtitled or dubbed. This nine-hour television miniseries aired in 1980, starring Richard Chamberlain, Toshiro Mifune, Yoko Shimada, and John Rhys-Davies. This was edited into a two-hour theatrical release. A 5-disc DVD release appeared in 2003 and a 3-disc Blu-ray release in 2014.

On August 3, 2018, it was announced that FX would be adapting the novel into a TV series. The 2024 series stars Hiroyuki Sanada, who also served as co-producer, Cosmo Jarvis, Anna Sawai, Tadanobu Asano, Takehiro Hira, Tommy Bastow and Fumi Nikaido. The trailer was released in late 2023 and the first two episodes premiered on February 27, 2024. In contrast to the 1980 miniseries, this closely follows both plot lines of the novel and translates the dialogue between the Japanese characters, although several characters' names are changed, for instance, Yabu was changed to Yabushige. Moreover, certain changes were made, including which characters died, as in the show, Nagakado and Hiromatsu (Naga and Hiro-matsu in the books) both died when their book counterparts survived. The series was met with acclaim, with special praise towards Sanada, Jarvis, Sawai, and Asano's performances. In May 2024, a second and third season were officially announced to be in development.

This marks the first work to be adapted into two television series resulted to win two Primetime Emmys for two divisions: Outstanding Limited Series in 1981 and Outstanding Drama Series in 2024.

=== Stage musical ===
A stage musical adaptation, Shōgun: The Musical, was produced in 1990.

=== Games ===
There have been three video games based on the novel. Two text-based adventure games with sparse graphics were produced for personal computers, marketed as James Clavell's Shōgun by Infocom and Shōgun by Mastertronic. A unique graphical adventure game, Shōgun, was also produced for systems including the Commodore 64, Amstrad CPC and IBM PC by Lee & Mathias and released by Virgin Entertainment in 1986.

The tabletop game publisher FASA published James Clavell's Shogun in 1983. This was the third of four boardgame titles based on Clavell novels.

A developer of Wizardry, one of the RPGs (role playing game) that are considered to have pioneered the gaming genre, admitted that the most powerful weapon in the game called Muramasa Blade was originally spelled as Murasama, as a result of referencing the sword that appeared in the novel.
