= James Clavell =

British writer and filmmaker (1921–1994)

- Born: Charles Edmund Dumaresq Clavell; 10 October 1921; Sydney, Australia
- Died: 7 September 1994 (aged 72); Vevey, Switzerland
- Citizenship: United Kingdom; United States (after 1963)
- Occupations: Novelist; screenwriter; director
- Spouse: April Stride (m. 1949)
- Children: 3
- Writing career
- Period: 1958–1993
- Military career
- Allegiance: United Kingdom
- Branch: British Army
- Service years: 1940–1948
- Rank: Captain
- Unit: Royal Artillery
- Conflicts: Second World War; Dutch East Indies campaign

Charles Edmund Dumaresq Clavell (10 October 1921 – 7 September 1994), known as James Clavell, was an English and American writer, filmmaker and a British Army officer during the Second World War. He is best known for his Asian Saga novels, a number of which have had television and film adaptations.

Clavell also wrote such screenplays as those for The Fly (1958), based on the short story by George Langelaan, and The Great Escape (1963), based on the personal account of Paul Brickhill. He directed the popular 1967 film To Sir, with Love, for which he also wrote the script.

During his war service, Clavell was a prisoner-of-war to Imperial Japan at Changi Prison, which formed the basis of his semi-autobiographical novel King Rat (1962) and its 1965 film adaptation.

== Biography ==
=== Early life ===
Born in Sydney, Australia, Clavell was the son of Commander Richard Charles Clavell (d. 23 June 1945), a Royal Navy officer who was stationed in Australia with the Royal Australian Navy from 1920 to 1922. (Richard Clavell's father was Major R.K. Clavell.) Richard Clavell was posted back to England when James was nine months old. Clavell was educated at The Portsmouth Grammar School.

=== World War II ===
In 1940, Clavell joined the Royal Artillery, and received an emergency Regular Army commission as a second lieutenant on 10 May 1941. Though trained for desert warfare, after the attack on Pearl Harbor in December 1941 he was sent to Singapore to fight the Japanese. The ship taking his unit was sunk en route to Singapore, and the survivors were picked up by a Dutch boat fleeing to India. The commander, described by Clavell years later as a "total twit", insisted that they be dropped off at the nearest port to fight the war despite having no weapons.

==== Imprisoned in Changi ====
Shot in the face, he was captured in Java in 1942 and sent to a local Japanese prisoner of war camp. Later, he was transferred to Changi Prison in Singapore.

In 1981, Clavell recounted:

Changi became my university instead of my prison. Among the inmates there were experts in all walks of life—the high and the low roads. I studied and absorbed everything I could from physics to counterfeiting, but most of all I learned the art of surviving, the most important course of all.

Prisoners were fed a quarter of a pound (110 g) of rice per day, one egg per week and occasional vegetables. Clavell believed that if atomic bombs had not been dropped on Hiroshima and Nagasaki he would not have survived the war.

Clavell did not talk about his wartime experiences with anyone, even his wife, for 15 years after the war. For a time he carried a can of sardines in his pocket at all times and fought an urge to forage for food in rubbish bins. He also experienced bad dreams and a nervous stomach kept him awake at night.

=== Post-war career ===
After the war, Clavell was promoted to war-substantive lieutenant, with effect from 1 August 1942, and to temporary captain on 10 June 1946, A motorcycle crash, however, ended his military career. On 20 July 1948, he was officially discharged from the army on account of disability, leaving with the honorary rank of captain. He enrolled with the University of Birmingham, where he met April Stride, an actress, whom he married in February 1949 (date of marriage sometimes given as 1951). He would visit her on the film sets where she was working and began to be interested in becoming a film director.

=== Early work on films ===
Clavell entered the film industry via distribution and worked at that in England for a number of years. He tried to get into producing but had no luck, so he started writing screenplays. In 1954 he moved to New York, then to Hollywood. While trying to break into screenwriting, he paid the bills working as a carpenter.

In 1956, he sold a script about pilots to RKO, Far Alert. The same year Michael Pate bought a story of his, Forbidden Territory, for filming.

Neither was filmed but Far Alert kept being sold and re-sold. "In 18 months it brought in $87,000", he later said. "We kept getting paid for writing it and rewriting it as it went from one studio to another. It was wonderful." It was later sold to Fox where it attracted the attention of Robert L. Lippert, who hired Clavell to write the science-fiction horror movie The Fly (1958). This became a hit and launched Clavell as a screenwriter.

He wrote Watusi (1959) for director Kurt Neumann, who had also made The Fly.

Clavell wrote Five Gates to Hell (1959) for Lippert, and when they could not find a suitable director, Clavell was given the job.

Paramount hired Clavell to write a film about the Bounty mutineers. It ended up not being made, nor was a proposed movie about Francis Gary Powers. Clavell did write, produce, and direct a Western at Paramount, Walk Like a Dragon (1960).

In 1959, Clavell wrote "Moon Landing" and "First Woman in the Moon", two episodes of Men into Space, a "day after tomorrow"-style science fiction drama, which depicted, in realistic terms, the (at the time) near future of space exploration.

In 1960, Clavell wrote a Broadway show with John Sturges, White Alice, a thriller set in the Arctic. It was never produced.

=== Early prose and screenplay work ===
In 1960, the Writers Guild went on strike, meaning Clavell was unable to work. He decided to write a novel, King Rat, based on his time at Changi. It took him three months and several more months after that to rework it. The book was published in 1962 and sold well. It was turned into a film in 1965.

In August 1960 Clavell announced he would set up his own production company, Cee Productions, to make three films: Unwanted from a novel by James Lindsay, Kingdom of the Mad and Earthquake. None were made. The following year Clavell announced Cee Productions would make the films King Rat, White Alice and No Hands on the Clock.

In 1962, Clavell signed a multi picture contract with a Canadian company to produce and direct two films there, Circle of Greed and The Sweet and the Bitter. Only the second was made and it was not released until 1967.

Clavell wrote scripts for the war films The Great Escape (1963) and 633 Squadron (1964).

He wrote a short story, "The Children's Story" (1963), and the script for The Satan Bug (1965), directed by John Sturges, who had made The Great Escape. He also wrote Richard Sahib for Sturges which was never made.

Clavell wanted to write a second novel because "that separates the men from the boys". The money from King Rat enabled him to spend two years researching and then writing what became Tai-Pan (1966). It was a huge best-seller, and Clavell sold the film rights for a sizeable amount (although the film would not be made until 1986).

=== Leading film director ===
Clavell returned to filmmaking. He wrote, produced and directed To Sir, with Love (1967), featuring Sidney Poitier and based on E. R. Braithwaite's semiautobiographical 1959 book. It was a huge critical and commercial success.

Clavell was now in much demand as a filmmaker. He produced and directed Where's Jack? (1969), a highwayman film which was a commercial failure. So too was an epic film about the Thirty Years' War, The Last Valley (1971).

=== Career as novelist ===
Clavell returned to novel writing, which was the focus of the remainder of his career. He spent three years researching and writing Shōgun (1975), about an Englishman who becomes a samurai in feudal Japan. It was another massive best-seller. Clavell was heavily involved in the 1980 miniseries which starred Richard Chamberlain and achieved huge ratings.

In the late 1970s he spent three years researching and writing his fourth novel, Noble House (1981), set in Hong Kong in 1963. It was another best-seller and was turned into a miniseries in 1986.

Clavell briefly returned to filmmaking and directed a thirty-minute adaptation of his novelette The Children's Story. He was meant to do a sequel to Shōgun but instead wrote a novel about the 1979 revolution in Iran, Whirlwind (1986).

Clavell eventually returned to the Shōgun sequel, writing Gai-Jin (1993). This was his last completed novel.

== Novelist ==
The New York Times said that "Clavell has a gift. It may be something that cannot be taught or earned. He breathes narrative ... He writes in the oldest and grandest tradition that fiction knows". His first novel, King Rat (1962), was a semi-fictional account of his prison experiences at Changi. When the book was published it became an immediate best-seller, and three years later it was adapted as a movie. His next novel, Tai-Pan (1966), was a fictional account of Jardine Matheson's successful career in Hong Kong, as told via the character who was to become Clavell's heroic archetype, Dirk Struan. Struan's descendants were characters in almost all of his following books. Tai-Pan was adapted as a movie in 1986.

Clavell's third novel, Shōgun (1975), is set in 17th-century Japan, and it tells the story of a shipwrecked English navigator in Japan, based on that of William Adams. When the story was made into a TV miniseries in 1980, produced by Clavell, it became the second-highest-rated miniseries in history (after Roots) with an audience of more than 120 million. A second 10-episode production of the epic was released in 2024 by FX on Hulu and FX. It set a new record as the most awarded single season of television in Emmy history, and won the Primetime Emmy for Outstanding Drama Series.

Clavell's fourth novel, Noble House (1981), became a best-seller that year and was adapted into a TV miniseries in 1988.

Following the success of Noble House, Clavell wrote Thrump-o-moto (1985), Whirlwind (1986) and Gai-Jin (1993).

=== Peter Marlowe ===
Peter Marlowe is Clavell's author surrogate and a character of the novels King Rat and Noble House (1981); he is also mentioned once (as a friend of Andrew Gavallan's) in Whirlwind (1986). Featured most prominently in King Rat, Marlowe is an English prisoner of war in Changi Prison during World War II. In Noble House, set two decades later, he is a novelist researching a book about Hong Kong. Marlowe's ancestors are also mentioned in other Clavell novels.

In Noble House Marlowe is mentioned as having written a novel about Changi which, although fictionalised, is based on real events (like those in King Rat). When asked which character was based on him, Marlowe answers, "Perhaps I'm not there at all", although in a later scene, he admits he was "the hero, of course".

== Politics and later life ==
In 1962, Clavell moved to Vancouver, Canada, with his family joining him the following year. Although he became a naturalised citizen of the United States in 1963, he and April remained in Vancouver and raised their daughters there. Politically, he was said to have been an ardent individualist and proponent of laissez-faire capitalism, as many of his books' heroes exemplify. Clavell admired Ayn Rand, founder of the Objectivist school of philosophy. In 1981, Clavell sent Rand a copy of Noble House inscribed: "This is for Ayn Rand—one of the real, true talents on this earth for which many, many thanks. James C, New York, 2 September 81."

In 1972, Clavell moved to Switzerland. Although he and his wife primarily based themselves there, they also maintained homes in Austria, Saint-Jean-Cap-Ferrat on the French Riviera, the United States, and United Kingdom. Between 1970 and 1990, Clavell owned Fredley Manor near Mickleham, located in Surrey in South East England.

== Personal life ==
Clavell had three children. He and his wife had two daughters, Michaela and Holly. Clavell had an affair with Caroline Naylen Barrett, who was born in Tokyo to a Japanese mother and an American G.I. father. They had a daughter, Petra Barrett Brando-Corval, born in 1972. Barrett, the longtime personal assistant and later girlfriend of Marlon Brando, raised Petra in England; Brando legally adopted Petra in 1981.

== Death and legacy ==
In 1994, Clavell died in Switzerland from a stroke while suffering from cancer. He was 72.

After sponsorship by his widow, the library and archive of the Royal Artillery Museum at the Royal Arsenal, Woolwich, in southeast London, was renamed the James Clavell Library in his honour. The library was later closed pending the opening of a new facility in Salisbury, Wiltshire; however, James Clavell Square on the Royal Arsenal development on Woolwich riverside remains.

== Bibliography ==
=== Novels ===
The Asian Saga consists of six novels:

1. King Rat (1962), set in a Japanese POW camp in Singapore in 1945.
2. Tai-Pan (1966), set in Hong Kong in 1841
3. Shōgun (1975), set in Japan from 1600 onwards
4. Noble House (1981), set in Hong Kong in 1963
5. Whirlwind (1986), set in Iran in 1979.
6. Gai-Jin (1993), set in Japan in 1862

=== Children's stories ===
- "The Children's Story" (1964 Reader's Digest short story; reprinted as a standalone book in 1981)
- Thrump-O-Moto (1986), illustrated by George Sharp

=== Nonfiction ===
- The Art of War (1983), a translation of Sun Tzu's book

=== Theatre ===
- Countdown to Armageddon (1966)

== Filmography ==
=== Film ===
Year	Title	Functioned as			Notes
Year	Title	Director	Writer	Producer	Notes
1958	The Fly	No	Yes	No	
1959	Watusi	No	Yes	No	
1959	Five Gates to Hell	Yes	Yes	Yes	
1960	Walk Like a Dragon	Yes	Yes	Yes	
1963	The Great Escape	No	Yes	No	Co-writer with W. R. Burnett
1964	633 Squadron	No	Yes	No	Co-writer with Howard Koch
1965	The Satan Bug	No	Yes	No	Co-writer with Edward Anhalt
1967	To Sir, with Love	Yes	Yes	Yes	
1967	The Sweet and the Bitter	Yes	Yes	No	
1969	Where's Jack?	Yes	No	Yes	
1971	The Last Valley	Yes	Yes	Yes	

=== Television ===
Year	Title	Functioned as			Notes
Year	Title	Director	Writer	Producer	Notes
1959	Men into Space	No	Yes	No	2 episodes
1960–61	The Rifleman	Yes	No	No	2 episodes
1961	Whiplash	No	Yes	No	1 episode
1961	The Detectives	Yes	No	No	2 episodes
1961–62	Ripcord	Yes	No	No	8 episodes
1980	Shōgun	No	No	Executive	Miniseries
1982	The Children's Story	Yes	Yes	Yes	TV movie
1988	Noble House	No	No	Executive	Miniseries

== Adaptations of Clavell's writings ==
=== Film ===
- King Rat (1965) - Based on King Rat
- Tai-Pan (1986) - Based on Tai-Pan

=== Television ===
- Shōgun (1980), miniseries - Based on Shōgun
- The Children's Story (1982), TV movie - Based on "The Children's Story"
- Noble House (1988), miniseries - Based on Noble House
- Shōgun (2024–present), series - Based on Shōgun

=== Interactive fiction ===
- James Clavell's Shōgun (1986, Virgin Games) for Amstrad CPC, Commodore 64 and MS-DOS) - Based on Shōgun
- James Clavell's Shōgun (1988, Infocom) for Amiga, Apple II, MS-DOS and Mac - Based on Shōgun
