= King Rat (Clavell novel) =

1962 novel by James Clavell

- First Edition (UK)
- Author: James Clavell
- Language: English
- Series: Asian Saga
- Genre: Historical novel
- Publisher: Little, Brown and Company (US); Michael Joseph (UK)
- Publication date: 1962
- Publication place: United Kingdom
- Media type: Print (hardback and paperback)
- Pages: 400 (paperback)
- Preceded by: Gai-Jin (in chronology of Asian Saga)
- Followed by: Noble House

King Rat is a 1962 novel by James Clavell and the author's literary debut. Set during World War II, the novel describes the struggle for survival of American, Australian, British, Dutch and New Zealander prisoners of war in a Japanese camp in Singapore. Clavell was a prisoner in the Changi Prison camp, where the novel is set. One of the three major characters, Peter Marlowe, is based upon Clavell.

King Rat was the first book published of Clavell's sweeping series, the Asian Saga, and the fourth chronologically. Two characters from King Rat also appear in Noble House (1981).

== Plot summary ==
The novel opens in early 1945. Peter Marlowe, a young British RAF Flight Lieutenant, has been a P.O.W. since 1942. Marlowe comes to the attention of the "King" - an American corporal who has become the most successful trader and black marketeer in Changi - when King sees him conversing in Malay. Marlowe's languages, intelligence, honesty, and personality cause King to befriend him and attempt to involve him in black market deals, which bring Marlowe to the attention of Robin Grey, a British officer and Provost Marshal of the camp, who has developed a Javert-like obsession with King and hopes to arrest him for violating camp regulations. Grey is attempting to maintain military discipline among the prisoners and sees King as the antithesis of his beliefs. As the son of a working-class family, Grey follows the rules for their own sake, using his position as Provost Marshal to gain a status otherwise unavailable to him in British society.

Despite being an enlisted man and undistinguished in civilian life, King has become a major power in the closed society of the POW camp through his charisma and intelligence. Trading with Korean guards, local Malay villagers, and other prisoners for food, clothing, information, and what few luxuries are available, King keeps himself and his fellow American prisoners alive. Senior officers come to him for help in selling their valuables to buy food, and other officers are secretly on his payroll. Marlowe is initially put off by King's perspective and behaviour, which clash with the British upper class ideals he has been taught. He turns down a lucrative business partnership with King because "Marlowes aren't tradesmen. It just isn't done, old boy." Marlowe soon understands that King is not the thief and con artist that Grey would have him believe. Rather, King asks for the best of each man and rewards him accordingly, irrespective of class or position.

Through the experiences of Marlowe, King, and other characters, the novel offers a vivid, often disturbing portrayal of men brought to the edge of survival by a brutal environment. The P.O.W.s are given nothing by the Japanese other than filthy huts to live in and the bare minimum of food. Officers from various parts of Britain's Asian empire, accustomed to having native servants provide them with freshly laundered uniforms daily, are reduced to wearing rags and homemade shoes. For most, the chief concern is obtaining enough food to stay alive from day to day and avoiding disease or injury, since almost no medical care is available. Some are degraded and come close to losing their humanity, while others display levels of courage and compassion beyond expectations. Some steal food out the mouths of their comrades, while others give away what they have or take terrible risks to help their friends.

King decides he and his friends should breed rats to sell for food. His comrades, though nearly starving themselves, are repelled by the idea of eating rat meat, so King comes up with the plan of only selling the meat to officers without telling them the true source. A group of officers who stole money from their underlings are later seen greedily enjoying a meal of what they are told is mouse deer (rusa tikus in Malay), not knowing they are actually eating rat meat. When the camp is ultimately liberated at the end of the war, most of the soldiers have trouble adjusting to freedom. King loses his power and is shunned by the others. Grey ironically thanks King on the grounds that his hatred of King was the only thing keeping him alive. At the end, the rats are abandoned in their cages when the camp is abandoned. The final scene has the rats consuming each other one by one, with the final survivor becoming "king of the rats."

== Characters in King Rat ==
- The King – a shrewd American corporal, the healthiest prisoner of the Changi prison camp, and the camp's top top black marketeer. At the end of the novel, he is sent back to the United States under an impending investigation for illegal profiteering in a prison camp, and Marlowe never sees him again.
- Peter Marlowe – the protagonist, a young upper class British fighter pilot who later becomes an author; based on James Clavell
- Robin Grey – a young British lieutenant from the lower classes, the Camp Provost Marshall [MP], and the antagonist to Marlowe and The King
- Percy Smedly-Taylor - British Colonel, later appears as a director of Struan's Holdings, MP, in Clavell's subsequent novel Whirlwind.

Two characters from King Rat also appear in Noble House (published 1981), a novel set in Hong Kong in the early 1960s, when Marlowe is a writer visiting Hong Kong to conduct research about the great British trading companies there. Grey, embittered by his failure to obtain a commission in the postwar British Army despite his suffering during the war, has become a radical socialist Member of UK Parliament and is also in Hong Kong on an official visit. Unknown to Marlowe, Grey has become a secret Communist and a Soviet agent who tries to thwart efforts to improve relations between China and the West.

== Reception ==
Upon its release in 1962, King Rat received both praise and criticism. In The New York Times (6 August 1962), Orville Prescott described Clavell as "a brilliant observer, a man who understands much and forgives much. He is also a spellbinding storyteller," calling the novel "one of the two or three finest novels so far published this year." By contrast, Kirkus Reviews (15 June 1962) noted that while the book offered "a new look" at life in a prisoner-of-war camp, "the characters lack the depth to elicit sufficient interest in their very real dilemma."

== Film adaptation ==
A film adaptation by writer/director Bryan Forbes was released by Columbia Pictures in 1965, the first of several of Clavell's novels to be so adapted. The film starred George Segal as King, James Fox as Marlowe, Tom Courtenay as Grey, and John Mills as Smedley-Taylor.

== See also ==
- Changi (miniseries), fictional Australian POWs at Changi
