= Shōgun (1980 miniseries) =

1980 American historical drama television miniseries

- Title card
- Genre: Historical drama
- Based on: Shōgun by James Clavell
- Written by: Eric Bercovici
- Directed by: Jerry London
- Starring: Richard Chamberlain; Toshiro Mifune; Yoko Shimada; Damien Thomas; John Rhys-Davies; Frankie Sakai; Alan Badel; Michael Hordern
- Music by: Maurice Jarre
- Country of origin: United States
- Original languages: English; Japanese
- No. of episodes: 5 (list of episodes)

Production
- Executive producer: James Clavell
- Producer: Eric Bercovici
- Cinematography: Andrew Laszlo
- Camera setup: Multi-camera
- Running time: 180 minutes (premiere/finale); 120 minutes (episodes 2–4); 159 minutes (theatrical version, Japan); 125 minutes (theatrical version, Europe)
- Production company: Paramount Television
- Budget: $22 million ($69 million in 2020)

Original release
- Network: NBC
- Release: September 15 – September 19, 1980

Shōgun is a 1980 American historical drama miniseries based on James Clavell's 1975 novel of the same name. The series was produced by Paramount Television and first broadcast in the United States on NBC over five nights between September 15 and 19, 1980. It was written by Eric Bercovici and directed by Jerry London, and stars Richard Chamberlain, Toshiro Mifune, and Yoko Shimada, with a large supporting cast. Clavell served as executive producer.

The miniseries is loosely based on the adventures of English navigator William Adams, who journeyed to Japan in 1600 and rose to high rank in the service of the shōgun. It follows fictional John Blackthorne's (Chamberlain) experiences and political intrigues in feudal Japan in the early 17th century.

Shōgun received generally positive reviews from critics and won several accolades, including the Primetime Emmy Award for Outstanding Limited Series, the Golden Globe Award for Best Television Series – Drama, and a 1981 Peabody Award.

A new adaptation of Clavell's novel was produced by FX and released on FX on Hulu in 2024.

== Plot ==
After his Dutch trading ship Erasmus and its surviving crew is blown ashore by a violent storm at Anjiro on the east coast of Japan, Pilot-Major John Blackthorne, the ship's English navigator, is taken prisoner by samurai warriors. When he is later temporarily released, he must relinquish his English identity, while adapting to the alien Japanese culture in order to survive. Being an Englishman, Blackthorne is at both religious and political odds with his enemy, the Portuguese traders, and the Catholic Church's Jesuit order. The Catholic foothold in Japan puts Blackthorne, a Protestant and therefore a heretic, at a political disadvantage. This same situation, however, also brings him under the scrutiny of the influential Lord Toranaga, who mistrusts this foreign religion now spreading throughout Japan. He is competing with other samurai warlords of similar high-born rank, among them Catholic converts, for the very powerful position of shōgun, the military governor of Japan.

Through an interpreter, Blackthorne later reveals certain surprising details about the Portuguese traders and their Jesuit overlords. He explains to Lord Toranaga about the terms of the Treaty of Tordesillas which was signed between Portugal and Spain in 1494, forcing Toranaga to trust him; they forge a tenuous alliance, much to the chagrin of the Jesuits. To help the Englishman learn their language and to assimilate to Japanese culture, Toranaga assigns a teacher and interpreter to him, the beautiful Lady Mariko, a Catholic convert and one of Toranaga's most trusted retainers. Blackthorne soon becomes infatuated with her, but Mariko is already married, and their budding romance is ultimately doomed by future circumstances. Blackthorne also saves the life of a Portuguese counterpart, pilot Vasco Rodrigues, who becomes his friend despite their opposing loyalties.

Blackthorne saves Toranaga's life by audaciously helping him escape from Osaka Castle and the clutches of his longtime enemy, Lord Ishido. To reward the Englishman and to bind him to his own service, Toranaga makes Blackthorne hatamoto, a personal retainer, and gives him a European flintlock pistol. Later, Blackthorne again saves Toranaga's life during an earthquake by pulling him from a fissure that opened and swallowed the warlord, nearly killing him. Having proved his worth and loyalty to the warlord, during a night ceremony held before a host of his assembled vassals and samurai, Lord Toranaga makes Blackthorne a samurai; he awards him the two swords, 20 kimono, 200 of his own samurai, and an income-producing fief, the fishing village Anjiro, where Blackthorne was first blown ashore with his ship and crew. Blackthorne's repaired ship Erasmus, under guard by Toranaga's samurai and anchored near Kyoto, is lost to a fire, which spread quickly when the ships' night lamps were knocked over by a storm tidal surge. During a later attack on Osaka Castle by the Amida Tong (ninja assassins), secretly paid for by Lord Ishido, Mariko is killed while saving Blackthorne's life; he is temporarily blinded by the black powder explosion that kills her. Lord Yabu is forced to commit seppuku for his involvement with the ninja attack, into which he was coerced by Ishido. Right before he dies, Yabu gives Blackthorne his katana, and Yabu's nephew Omi becomes the daimyō of Izu.

Blackthorne supervises the construction of a new ship, The Lady, using funds Mariko left to him in her will for this very purpose. Blackthorne is observed at a distance by Lord Toranaga; in a voice-over, he reveals his inner thoughts, observing that Blackthorne still has much to teach him. It was Toranaga who ordered the Erasmus destroyed by fire to keep Blackthorne safe from his Portuguese enemies, who feared his potentially hostile actions with the ship. He also discloses Mariko's secret but vital role in the grand deception of his enemies and as a result that she was destined to die, helping to assure his coming final victory. The warlord knows that Blackthorne's karma brought him to Japan and that the Englishman, now his trusted retainer and samurai, is destined never to leave. Toranaga also knows it is his own karma to become shōgun.

An epilogue reveals that Toranaga and his army are triumphant at the Battle of Sekigahara; he captures and then disgraces his old rival Lord Ishido, burying him up to his neck to die slowly. The narrator concludes that when the Emperor of Japan offered Toranaga the position of shōgun, he "reluctantly agreed".

== Cast ==
Performer	Role
Starring
Richard Chamberlain	Pilot-Major John Blackthorne ("Anjin-san", based on William Adams)
Toshiro Mifune	Yoshi Toranaga, Lord of the Kanto Region
Yoko Shimada	Lady Toda Buntaro ("Mariko")
Frankie Sakai	Lord Kashigi Yabu, Daimyo of Izu
Also starring
Alan Badel	Father Dell'Aqua
Michael Hordern	Friar Domingo
Damien Thomas	Father Martin Alvito
John Rhys-Davies	Vasco Rodrigues
Vladek Sheybal	Captain Ferreira
George Innes	Johann Vinck
Leon Lissek	Father Sebastio
Yūki Meguro	Kashigi Omi, Head Samurai of Anjiro
Hideo Takamatsu	Lord Toda Buntaro, Mariko's husband
Hiromi Senno	Usagi Fujiko
Nobuo Kaneko	Ishido Kazunari, Ruler of Osaka Castle
Featuring
Edward Peel	Jan Pieterzoon
Eric Richard	Maetsukker
Steve Ubels	Roper
Stewart MacKenzie	Croocq
John Carney	Ginsel
Ian Jentle	Salamon
Neil McCarthy	Spillbergen
Morgan Sheppard	Specz
Seiji Miyaguchi	Muraji
Tōru Abe	Toda Hiromatsu
Mika Kitagawa	Kiku
Shin Takuma	Yoshi Naga
Hiroshi Hasegawa	Galley Captain
Akira Sera	Old Gardener
Hyoei Enoki	Jirobei
Miiko Taka	Kiri
Midori Takei	Sono
Ai Matsubara	Rako
Yumiko Morishita	Asa
Rinichi Yamamoto	Yoshinaka
Yuko Kada	Sazuko
Masumi Okada	Brother Michael
Yosuke Natsuki	Zataki
Takeshi Obayashi	Urano
Yoshie Kitsuda	Gyoko
Masashi Ebara	Suga
Setsuko Sekine	Genjiko
Atsuko Sano	Lady Ochiba
Orson Welles	Narrator

Only three of the Japanese actors spoke English in the entire production: Shimada, Obayashi, and Okada. At the time of filming, Shimada knew very little English, and heavily relied on her dialogue coach to deliver her lines phonetically. The English words that she could not pronounce were substituted or overdubbed in post-production.

== Episodes ==
Episode	Original US air date	Times	Notes	Household rating	Household viewers (millions)
01	15 September 1980	8 pm – 11 pm Eastern	(3 hr opener)	29.5	23.0
02	16 September 1980	8 pm – 10 pm Eastern		31.7	24.7
03	17 September 1980	9 pm – 11 pm Eastern		36.9	28.7
04	18 September 1980	9 pm – 11 pm Eastern		35.6	27.7
05	19 September 1980	8 pm – 11 pm Eastern	(3 hr finale)	31.5	24.5

== Production ==
Clavell and NBC wanted Sean Connery to play Blackthorne, but Connery reportedly laughed at the idea of working for months in Japan, as he had disliked filming You Only Live Twice there. According to the documentary The Making of Shōgun, other actors considered for the role included Roger Moore and Albert Finney.

Clavell said he was originally opposed to Richard Chamberlain's casting, wanting Albert Finney. However he was extremely happy with Chamberlain's performance: "He's marvelous", said Clavell.

The 16th-century European sailing ship used in the series was Golden Hinde, a replica of Sir Francis Drake's Golden Hind. It was built in the early 1970s to mark the 400th anniversary of Drake's circumnavigation. After it underwent a restoration programme, the ship remains as an exhibit located at St Mary Overie Dock, Cathedral Street, London, SE1 9DE, United Kingdom.

Shots of Toranaga's castle used Hikone Castle in Shiga Prefecture.

The Japanese characters speak in Japanese throughout, except when translating for Blackthorne; the original broadcast did not use subtitles for the Japanese dialog. As the movie was presented from Blackthorne's point of view, the producers felt that "what he doesn't understand, we [shouldn't] understand".

=== Sexuality and violence ===
Shōgun broke several broadcast taboos and contained several firsts for American television.

- It was the first network show allowed to use the word "piss" in dialogue, and show someone being urinated on (but not showing male genitalia, and presumably only simulated). As a symbolic act of Blackthorne's subservience to the Japanese ruling class and to punish him for saying "I piss on you and your country", Blackthorne is urinated upon by Kashigi Omi, a local leading samurai.
- In the first episode, Blackthorne's stranded shipmates are to be suspended in a cargo net into a boiling vat of soy sauce and water; one of them, Pieterzoon, is killed that way until Blackthorne acquiesces to the Japanese nobility.
- A man is shown beheaded early in the first chapter, another first for network TV (although the film version of the sequence was more bloody).
- Men are shown wearing fundoshi.
- Mariko is shown naked in a non-sexual bath scene, sitting with her legs positioned strategically, and the U.S. broadcast showing her with her arms obscuring her breasts, while other broadcasts showed her topless. Later when Blackthorne is reunited with his men, a woman's breast is visible.
- Shōgun was also noted for its frank discussion of sexuality (e.g., pederasty), and matters such as Japanese ritual suicide (seppuku).

== Release ==
=== Broadcast ===
Shōgun was broadcast in the United States on NBC over five nights between September 15 and 19, 1980. A version of the miniseries edited into one-hour episodes has been broadcast in North America.

=== Theatrical release ===
In Japan, Shōgun was cut to a 159-minute version and released theatrically on November 9, 1980. Stuart Galbraith IV described this version of the film as "fatally cut to ribbons". It was later restored to its full length for a home video release in Japan.

A heavily truncated 125-minute edit of the miniseries was released in 1980 to European theatrical film markets. This was also the first version of Shōgun to be released to the North American home video market (a release of the full miniseries did not occur until later). The theatrical version contains additional violence and nudity that had been removed from the NBC broadcast version.

=== Home media ===
The five-disc DVD release has no episode breaks and has bonus features on disc 5.

- DVD release: September 30, 2003
- Feature length: 547 minutes
- Extras: 13-segment documentary on the making of Shōgun (79:24); Historical Featurettes – The Samurai (5:34), Tea Ceremony (4:35) and Geisha (4:56); audio commentary by Director Jerry London on 7 selected scenes

The 125-minute version has yet to be released on DVD or Blu-ray.

CBS Home Entertainment's Blu-ray release of Shōgun on three discs was on July 22, 2014 and featured a 1080p remastered video presentation, a DTS-HD Master Audio 5.1 surround sound mix and a restored Dolby Digital mono track; the special features are exactly the same as on the original 2003 DVD release.

== Reception ==
=== Reception ===
Shōgun was produced after the success of the television miniseries Roots (1977) that had aired on the ABC Network in 1977. The success of Roots, as well as Jesus of Nazareth (1977), resulted in many other miniseries during the 1980s. Shōgun, which first aired in 1980, also became a highly rated program and continued the wave of miniseries over the next few years (such as North and South and The Thorn Birds) as networks clamored to capitalize on the format's success.

NBC had the highest weekly Nielsen ratings in its history with Shōgun. Its 26.3 average rating was the second highest in television history after ABC's with Roots. An average of 32.9% of all television households watched at least part of the series. The miniseries' success was credited with causing the mass-market paperback edition of Clavell's novel to become the best-selling paperback in the United States, with 2.1 million copies in print during 1980, and increased awareness of Japanese culture in America. In the documentary The Making of 'Shōgun' it is stated that the rise of Japanese food establishments in the United States (particularly sushi houses) is attributed to Shōgun. It was also noted that during the week of broadcast, many restaurants and movie houses saw a decrease in business. The documentary states many stayed home to watch Shōgun—unprecedented for a television broadcast. (The home VCR was not yet ubiquitous and still expensive in 1980.)

==== Reception in Japan ====
The miniseries was reported to have been negatively received in Japan, where it was broadcast in 1981 on TV Asahi, as the series' fictionalization of events in the 16th century seemed frivolous and trivial. Many Japanese viewers were already accustomed to historical drama series such as NHK's annual taiga dramas, which were considered more faithful towards the history they are depicting than the miniseries.

=== Viewership ===
Episode	Original US air date	Timeslot (ET)	Household rating	Household viewers (millions)
1	September 15, 1980	8 pm – 11 pm	29.5	23.0
2	September 16, 1980	8 pm – 10 pm	31.7	24.7
3	September 17, 1980	9 pm – 11 pm	36.9	28.7
4	September 18, 1980	9 pm – 11 pm	35.6	27.7
5	September 19, 1980	8 pm – 11 pm	31.5	24.5

== Accolades ==
Year	Award	Category	Nominee(s)	Result	Ref.
1980	Peabody Awards	—N/a	NBC and Paramount Television	Won	
1981	American Cinema Editors Awards	Best Edited Episode from a Television Mini-Series	James T. Heckert, Bill Luciano, Donald R. Rode, Benjamin A. Weissman, and Jerry Young (for "Episode 1")	Nominated	
1981	Golden Globe Awards	Best Television Series – Drama		Won	
1981	Golden Globe Awards	Best Actor in a Television Series – Drama	Richard Chamberlain	Won	
1981	Golden Globe Awards	Best Actress in a Television Series – Drama	Yoko Shimada	Won	
1981	People's Choice Awards	Favorite TV Mini-Series		Won	
1981	Primetime Emmy Awards	Outstanding Limited Series	James Clavell and Eric Bercovici	Won	
1981	Primetime Emmy Awards	Outstanding Lead Actor in a Limited Series or a Special	Richard Chamberlain	Nominated	
1981	Primetime Emmy Awards	Outstanding Lead Actor in a Limited Series or a Special	Toshiro Mifune	Nominated	
1981	Primetime Emmy Awards	Outstanding Lead Actress in a Limited Series or a Special	Yoko Shimada	Nominated	
1981	Primetime Emmy Awards	Outstanding Supporting Actor in a Limited Series or a Special	Yūki Meguro	Nominated	
1981	Primetime Emmy Awards	Outstanding Supporting Actor in a Limited Series or a Special	John Rhys-Davies	Nominated	
1981	Primetime Emmy Awards	Outstanding Directing in a Limited Series or a Special	Jerry London (for "Episode 5")	Nominated	
1981	Primetime Emmy Awards	Outstanding Writing in a Limited Series or a Special	Eric Bercovici (for "Episode 5")	Nominated	
1981	Primetime Emmy Awards	Outstanding Art Direction for a Limited Series or a Special	Joseph R. Jennings, Yoshinobu Nishioka, Tom Pedigo, and Shoichi Yasuda (for "Episode 5")	Nominated	
1981	Primetime Emmy Awards	Outstanding Cinematography for a Limited Series or a Special	Andrew Laszlo (for "Episode 4")	Nominated	
1981	Primetime Emmy Awards	Outstanding Costume Design for a Series	Shin Nishida (for "Episode 5")	Won	
1981	Primetime Emmy Awards	Outstanding Film Editing for a Limited Series or a Special	Donald R. Rode, Benjamin A. Weissman, Jerry Young, and Bill Luciano (for "Episode 5")	Nominated	
1981	Primetime Emmy Awards	Outstanding Achievement in Film Sound Editing	Stanley Paul, William M. Andrews, Leonard Corso, Denis Dutton, Jack A. Finlay, Robert Gutknecht, Sean Hanley, Pierre Jalbert, Jack Keath, Alan L. Nineberg, Lee Osborne, and Tally Paulos (for "Episode 3")	Nominated	
1981	Primetime Emmy Awards	Outstanding Graphic Design and Title Sequences	Phill Norman (for "Episode 1")	Won	

== See also ==
- List of historical films set in Asia
- Tokugawa Ieyasu, 1983 taiga drama about the life of Ieyasu, the basis for Lord Toranaga, aired two years after Shōgun's Japan release.
- Shōgun (2024 TV series), adapted from the same novel
