= Special settlement =

Special settlement may refer to:

- Special settlement (securities)
- Special settlements in the Soviet Union
