= Glint =

A glint is a short flash of light. Glint or Glints may also refer to:

- the reflection of the cornea; see Purkinje images
- Glints (platform), a Singaporean online talent recruitment platform

== Music ==
- Glint (band), the project of American musician Jase Blankfort
- Glints (musician), a Flemish hip hop artist
