= HRnetGroup =

Singaporean recruitment and consulting company

- Company type: Public
- Traded as: SGX: CHZ
- Industry: Employment agency
- Founded: 1992
- Founder: Peter Sim
- Headquarters: Singapore
- Area served: Southeast Asia
- Number of employees: 883 (2022)
- Website: www.hrnetgroup.com

HRnetGroup is a recruitment company based in Singapore. The company operates across multiple industries. HRnetGroup is listed on the Mainboard of the Singapore Exchange.

== History ==
HRnetGroup was founded by Peter Sim in 1992. They have offices in Malaysia, China, Hong Kong, Indonesia, Japan, South Korea and Thailand. Frost & Sullivan said in 2020 that when not including Japan, HRnetGroup is the Asia Pacific's biggest staffing firm.

== Investments ==
HRnetGroup holds a 14.47% share in Staffline Group. HRnetGroup acquired a 51% stake in REForce (Shanghai) Human Resources Management Consulting in 2018, invested US$378k in the recruitment website Glints, and acquired 51% stake in REForce (Shanghai) Human Resources Management Consulting.
