= Metascreen =

- Products: Metascreen metabolic screening test
- Owner: Cordlife Group Limited
- Website: http://www.metascreen.org

Metascreen is an advanced non-invasive metabolic screening test distributed by Cordlife Group Limited ("Cordlife"). It can detect as many as 110 inborn errors of metabolism ("IEMs", or metabolic disorders) from a urine specimen. Cordlife owns the brand name and trademark, "Metascreen".

== History ==
Metascreen, as a newborn metabolic screening test, was first launched by Cordlife in India in October 2013. Since April 2014, Metascreen became available also in Hong Kong and the Philippines through Cordlife for parents looking for more comprehensive screening of metabolic disorders for their children. As a newborn suffering from certain metabolic disorder, such as isovaleric acidemia, may appear asymptomatic in the first few days or even weeks of life, early detection and treatment is key in preventing irreversible lifelong complications, such as physical disability or mental retardation.

== Technology ==
Unlike the conventional dried blood spot test for newborn screening that involves a painful heel prick, Metascreen uses urine specimen, collected without harm or discomfort to the newborn, to detect as many as 110 metabolic disorders. The urine specimen is collected on a filter paper, which is then air-dried and sent to the laboratory for analysis using a gas chromatography-mass spectrometry instrument ("GC-MS"). GC-MS is a FDA approved method for urinary analyte detection, a gold standard for lipids, drug metabolites and environmental analysis.

Many of the IEMs that are classified as "organic acidemia", in which organic acids accumulate in the urine of newborns with these disorders, are easily and accurately picked up by GC-MS.. The GC-MS platform is recommended by the American College of Medical Genetics for the detection of organic and amino acidemias through the urine. Furthermore, the platform has also been shown to be reliable in detecting other types of IEMs, such as sugar metabolism disorders and fatty acid oxidation disorders. Indeed, GC-MS analysis is increasingly becoming a common way to diagnose IEMs for earlier intervention and treatment, resulting in a better outcome and quality of life.

== Use of urine as a diagnostic biofluid ==
As a major organ for excretion, the kidney removes waste materials and chemicals from the body, such as increased concentrations of intermediary metabolites of a particular pathway, making urine (the waste product from the kidney) particularly useful for medical diagnostics. The key advantages of using urine as a biofluid are: (1) its sterility. (2) accessibility and non-invasive method of collection; and (3) it being largely free from interfering proteins or lipids.

Although the human urine metabolome is a subset of the human serum metabolome, more than 484 compounds identified in urine by Bouatra et al. (either experimentally or via literature review) were not previously reported to be in blood. The same group hypothesised that this is because the kidneys do an extraordinary job of removing and/or concentrating certain metabolites from the blood, hence, compounds far below the limit of detection in blood (using today's instrumentation) are well above the detection limit in urine. This difference, combined with the ability of the kidneys to handle abnormally high or abnormally low concentrations of metabolites, makes urine a particularly useful biofluid for medical diagnostics. In fact, urinary metabolites have been used to characterize nearly 220 diseases.

== Controversies ==
Cordlife announced in October 2013 that Cordlife India has introduced Metascreen service through a strategic collaboration with Navigene Genetic Science, a genetic diagnostic and research company. In 2014, Navigene was embroiled in a controversy where its founders were accused of data and scientific research theft and fined for INR 3 Million by the Adjudicating Authority of the Department of Information Technology, Government of India. Navigene rejected all allegations and has filed a writ petition (No. WP/3291/2014) with the High Court of Mumbai to challenge and quash the order.
