= Tai Sin =

Tai Sin Electric Limited
- Type: Private
- Industry: Electrical manufacturing and distribution
- Founded: January 4, 1980; 46 years ago
- Headquarters: Singapore
- Area served: Southeast Asia
- Products: Cables, wires, electrical products
- Services: Power distribution solutions, testing and inspection, switchboard manufacturing
- Subsidiaries: Lim Kim Hai Electric Co (S) Pte Ltd; CAST Laboratories Pte Ltd
- Website: www.taisinelectric.com

Tai Sin (Tai Sin Electric Limited; TSEL) is a Singapore-based holding company specializing in the manufacturing and distribution of electrical products, cables, and wires. Established on 4 January 1980, the company operates across Southeast Asia. It has been listed on Singapore Exchange since 1998.

== History ==
Tai Sin was incorporated on 4 January 1980 as Tai Sin Electric Cables Manufacturer Pte Ltd. Initially focused on cable manufacturing, the company was listed on the Stock Exchange of Singapore, SESDAQ, on 23 April 1998 renamed Tai Sin Electric Cables Manufacturer Limited. In October of the same year Tai Sin established Tai Sin Electric Cables (Malaysia) Sdn Bhd ("TSECM"), a wholly owned subsidiary.

By October 2000 the company acquired a 70% stake in PKS Sdn Bhd ("PKS"), a company incorporated in Brunei which specializes in the assembly of switchboards and feeder pillars. It was followed by acquisition of Equalight Resources Sdn Bhd ("Equalight"), a newly incorporated company to undertake the manufacturing of lamps and lighting products in Malaysia in October 2001.

In 2002 Tai Sin acquired 100% stake in LKH Lamps Sdn Bhd ("LKH Lamps"), a licensed lamp manufacturer in Malaysia, making it a wholly owned subsidiary. Tai Sin also acquired 100% stake in Lim Kim Hai Electric Co (S) Pte Ltd ("LKHE") and its subsidiaries in May 2003, which is Singapore's major electrical distribution group serving the industrial, commercial and infrastructure sectors since 1958, making it a wholly owned subsidiary as well as 100% stake in Yat Lye Pte Limited ("Yat Lye"), a company specialized in plumbing, sanitary and sewerage installation work since 1951, making it a wholly owned subsidiary in July 2004.

In May 2005 Tai Sin transferred from SESDAQ to the Singapore Stock Exchange Mainboard. In July 2008 LKHE acquired a 30% stake in Nylect International Pte Ltd ("Nylect"), an investment holding company with principal activities that comprise mechanical & engineering design and installation work, to support each other in the bid for construction contracts.

In December 2009 Tai Sin (Vietnam) Pte Ltd acquired 100% stake in Dien Quang-Tai Sin Cable Company Limited, making it a wholly owned subsidiary, and renamed to Tai Sin Electric Cables (VN) Co Ltd ("TSECVN"). TSECVN established a 90% owned joint venture enterprise known as Lim Kim Hai Electric (VN) Co. Ltd ("LKHVN") for the trading of electrical products in Vietnam in January 2010. By January 2012 TSEL acquired 52.5% interest in CAST Laboratories Pte Ltd ("CAST Lab"), that specialises in building diagnostics, calibration & measurement, chemical, mechanical & non-destructive testing, and product certification to diversify the business activities of the group. In May 2018, CAST Lab acquired a 30% stake in Astar Laboratory Pte Ltd ("ASTAR"), which provides environmental engineering services. LKHE acquired a 40% stake in PT Elmecon Multikencana ("Elmecon"), which is in the field of engineering, automation and wireless monitoring control in Indonesia in October 2019.

In January 2021 TSEL established Tai Sin Power Distribution Pte Ltd ("TSPD") which focuses on power distribution. In July 2022, completed acquisition of Nishi Densen Sdn Bhd ("NSD") (previously known as Nishiden (Malaysia) Sdn Bhd ("Nishiden") which specializes in manufacturing prefabricated branch cables.

== Activities ==
Tai Sin operates through four main business segments: Cable & Wire, Electrical Material Distribution, Test and Inspection, and Switchboard.

The Cable & Wire segment focuses on designing, manufacturing, and trading cables, wires, and power distribution products, with factories in Singapore, Malaysia, and Vietnam. The Electrical Material Distribution segment supplies electrical products and accessories for industrial automation and maintenance. The Test and Inspection segment offers testing, inspection, and certification services for construction, building, and marine industries. The Switchboard segment specializes in designing and manufacturing low-voltage switchgear products for large buildings and industrial installations.
