= YHI International =

YHI International Limited (SGX: Y08 ) is an automotive products distribution company based and headquartered in Singapore. The company was founded in 1948 as sole proprietorship, by Tay Chin Kiat.

Today, YHI has subsidiaries and associated companies located in Singapore, Malaysia, Thailand, Vietnam, China, Hong Kong, Taiwan, USA, Japan, Canada, Australia, New Zealand, the UAE and Italy. In addition, YHI has 5 manufacturing plants in Shanghai and Suzhou in China, Taoyuan in Taiwan, and Sepang and Malacca in Malaysia.

== Distributorship ==
YHI International carries the tire brands of Yokohama, Nankang, Nexen, Pirelli, Nitto and Achilles. They also distribute various brands of alloy wheels. For commercial industrial products, they represent Hitachi, and FIAM brands of industrial batteries and E-Z-GO golf buggies.

== House Brand ==
They also have their own tire and battery under the "Neuton" brand.

== Sponsorship ==
On 29 February 2008, YHI announced that they had entered into a supply lightweight racing wheels and sponsorship agreement with Formula 1 team Scuderia Toro Rosso using their own house wheel brand called "Advanti Racing". The sponsorship involved total value of US$6 million over three years.
