= Cordlife =

Consumer health company

Cordlife Group Limited
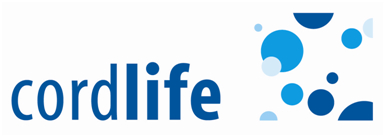
- Type: Public
- Traded as: SGX: P8A
- Industry: Healthcare Services
- Founded: 2 May 2001; 25 years ago
- Headquarters: Singapore
- Area served: China, Hong Kong, India, Indonesia, The Philippines, Malaysia (as Stemlife) and Thailand (under other brands through investment stake)
- Key people: Wu Gang(Non-Independent Non-Executive Chairman); Chen Xiaoling (Executive Director & Group CEO)
- Products: Cord blood banking, cord lining banking, metabolic screening and other products catering to the mother & child segment
- Revenue: S$27.6 million (FY2024)
- Number of employees: 937 (FY2017)
- Website: www.cordlife.com

Cordlife Group Limited, is a consumer health company incorporated in May 2001 and a provider of cord blood and cord lining banking services in Asia. Cordlife has been listed on the mainboard of SGX since March 2012.

Cordlife Group owns the largest network of cord blood banks in Asia with full stem cell processing and storage facilities in six markets including Singapore, Hong Kong, India, Indonesia, and the Philippines. Beyond cord blood and cord lining banking, Cordlife offers diagnostics services, particularly for the mother and child segment, including urine-based newborn metabolic screening, non-invasive prenatal testing, paediatric vision screening and family genetic screening services.

Cordlife's stem cell processing and storage facilities in Singapore, Hong Kong, India, Indonesia, the Philippines and Malaysia were accredited by AABB(formerly the American Association of Blood Banks) until 2024 when its accreditation was withdrawn.

In November 2023, the Ministry of Health of Singapore revealed that Cordlife Group had exposed cryopreserved cord blood units at suboptimal temperatures, damaging the cord blood units belonging to at least 2,150 clients and rendering them unsuitable for stem cell transplant purposes.

== History ==
=== 2001–2007 ===
CordLife pte ltd was incorporated on 2 May 2001, and subsequently received a licence to operate from the Ministry of Health of Singapore in either 2001 or 2002. In 2003, it merged with Cytomatrix LLC, and in June 2004, its holding company Cygenic Limited was listed on the Australian Securities Exchange.In 2005, the company then entered the Hong Kong and PRC markets through Cordlife Hong Kong. In 2007, Cygenic Limited was renamed to Cordlife Limited("CBB") in June, while Cordlife Hong Kong achieved ISO:9001 in August. CyGenics Ltd also received the 'Technology Pioneer' award from the World Economic Forum in 2007.

=== 2008–2011 ===
In either 2007 or 2008, their Science Park II facility was launched. In September 2009, they released a cord blood unit for cerebral palsy, while on October 31, Cordlife Limited invested a 10% indirect equity stake in Guangzhou Tianhe Nuoya, a company engaged in providing cord blood banking services in Guangdong province. In 2010, The 10% indirect stake and Cordlife Hong Kong was transferred to the group. In March 2010, Cordlife also released a cord blood unit for treatment of neuroblastoma in Singapore.

On 30 June 2011, Cordlife demerged from Cordlife Limited and entered into Rights Of First Refusal (ROFR) agreement to acquire relevant businesses in Indonesia, the Philippines and India.

=== 2012–2014 ===
They became listed on Mainboard of SGX-ST on March 29, 2012 In May 2013, Cordlife moved to its fully owned, 23,000 square feet office and laboratory facility in A'Posh Bizhub, Yishun In October 2013, the Group's Indian subsidiary, Cordlife Sciences (India) Pvt. Ltd., introduced a metabolic screening service known as Metascreen.

=== 2015–2023 ===
In October 2015, they became the first company in Singapore to win Frost & Sullivan Singapore Stem Cell Company of the Year Award. Also in 2015, they were named by Forbes as one of Asia's 200 Best Under A Billion (2015)

In January 2016, Cordlife was accredited by FACT-NETCORD. In November 2016, Cordlife India and majority-owned Hong Kong Screening Centre received accreditation from the College of American Pathologists (CAP).

In 2019, Group CEO Michael Weiss resigned and was replaced by Tan Poh Lan.

=== 2023–Present ===
In November 2023, the Ministry of Health of Singapore revealed that Cordlife Group had exposed cryopreserved cord blood units at suboptimal temperatures, damaging the cord blood units belonging to at least 2,150 clients and rendering them unsuitable for stem cell transplant purposes.On 15 December, the company was issued a six-month suspension and had to cease collecting, testing, processing and/or storing any new cord blood and human tissues. The suspension was extended by an additional three months on June 15 for Cordlife to complete the validation of its new cord blood processing method.

In March 2024, the group's former CEO and four other board members were arrested and released on bail. In August 2024, Cordlife was permitted to resume services on a limited basis.

Their license was subsequently renewed for one year from 14 January 2025.On 29 September, the Ministry of Health informed Cordlife that their license would be suspended after the midpoint audit found that Cordlife failed to maintain its compliance with various regulatory requirements, including governance, incident reporting and management, as well as processes for collection, testing and processing of new CBUs, the suspension coming into effect from 26 November 2025. In October 2025, Cordlife’s executive chairman resigned less than five months into the position.

On 14 January 2026, Cordlife announced that their cord blood banking service licence was renewed for a year, while its human tissue banking service licence was renewed for two years.

== Products and services ==
=== Cord Blood Banking ===
Cordlife's cord blood banking services are available in the following countries: Singapore, Hong Kong, India, Indonesia, Malaysia, the Philippines, Thailand, Bangladesh, Myanmar and Vietnam.

=== Cord Lining Banking ===
Cordlife's cord lining banking services are available in the following countries: Singapore, Hong Kong, India, Indonesia, Malaysia, the Philippines, Bangladesh, Myanmar and Vietnam.

=== Non-invasive Newborn Metabolic Screening ===
Cordlife has already launched this newborn metabolic screening test (Metascreen) in the following countries: Hong Kong (through HealthBaby and Cordlife Hong Kong), Philippines, Indonesia and Malaysia.

=== Non-invasive Prenatal Testing ===
Non-invasive prenatal testing ("NIPT") is a prenatal screening test that analyses foetal DNA in the mother's blood for potential foetal chromosomal abnormalities, including Down syndrome, Edwards syndrome and Patau syndrome. Cordlife offers this service in Singapore, India, Indonesia and the Philippines.

=== Paediatric Vision Screening ===
Cordlife offers paediatric vision screening marketed under the brand Eyescreen, a marketing trademark of the Group's wholly owned subsidiary Cordlife Technologies Pte Ltd. Eyescreen is a safe and non-invasive paediatric vision screening service for children aged between six months and six years old. The test detects up to 11 eye conditions such as strabismus (crossed eyes) and amblyopia (lazy eye) using a device with photoscreening technology. It is abailable in Singapore

== International operations ==
=== Singapore ===
Cordlife Singapore is the country's first private cord blood bank and the corporate headquarters of the Group. Situated at A’Posh Bizhub, Yishun, Cordlife Singapore's fully owned 23,000 square feet processing and storage facility has a storage capacity of up to 650,000 cord blood units. Since 2005, Cordlife Singapore has been accredited by AABB. To date, Cordlife Singapore has successfully released 14 cord blood units to its clients. In May 2013, Cordlife Technologies Pte Ltd (“CTPL”), a wholly owned subsidiary of the Group, launched cord lining banking service in Singapore. In December 2015, their facility was successfully accredited by FACT-Netcord.

=== Hong Kong ===
Launched in 2005, Cordlife (Hong Kong) Limited (“Cordlife Hong Kong”) is a wholly owned subsidiary of the Group. Cordlife Hong Kong moved into a new facility at the Hong Kong Science Park in 2010. The AABB & ISO certified facility has a storage capacity for 50,000 cord blood and umbilical cord units. In January 2011, Cordlife Hong Kong became the only private cord blood bank in Hong Kong to have released a cord blood unit for autologous (with one's own stem cells) transplantation to aid the treatment of neuroblastoma. In March 2011, Cordlife Hong Kong introduced CellOptima, a patented cord lining stem cell technology to extract Mesenchymal stem cells (MSCs) and Epithelial Stem Cells (EpSCs) from umbilical cord.. In 2014, Cordlife Hong Kong launched Metascreen, a newborn metabolic screening service, in Hong Kong. In January 2018, Cordlife acquired HealthBaby Biotech (Hong Kong) Co., Limited, the largest private cord blood bank in Hong Kong. HealthBaby is accredited by AABB, CAP, FACT and certified by HOKLAS.

=== Indonesia ===
Cordlife Indonesia has been providing cord blood processing and cryopreservation service to families in Indonesia since 2003. In October 2007, Cordlife Indonesia opened the first and only DEPKES licensed private cord blood banking facility in Indonesia. Located in Jakarta, Cordlife Indonesia's ISO-certified processing and storage facility has a storage capacity of 30,000 cord blood units. Cordlife Indonesia also has branch offices in Medan, Surabaya and Bandung. PT.Cordlife Persada has become the first in Indonesia to join the ranks of world-class cord blood banks as an AABB accredited facility. With Cordlife Indonesia's new AABB accreditation status, Cordlife clients in Indonesia can now opt to have their transplant or infusion done in countries such as United States and Singapore, where only cord blood units (if imported) handled by AABB or its equivalent accredited facilities, will be permitted or preferred for use.

=== India ===
Cordlife Group owns a majority interest (99.9%) in Cordlife Sciences (India) Pvt. Ltd., (“Cordlife India”) through its wholly owned subsidiary CS Cell Technologies Pte. Ltd. Established in Kolkata, Cordlife India's cord blood facility has a storage capacity of up to 150,000 cord blood units. In July 2013, Cordlife India attained accreditation from AABB, an international, not-for-profit association representing individuals and institutions involved in the field of transfusion medicine and cellular therapies. The facility is also certified by ISO 9001:2008. In 2011, Cordlife India successfully released a stem cell unit for the first ever mixed stem cell transplant in India. Cordlife India introduced an advanced non-invasive newborn metabolic screening test called Metascreen in India in October 2013.

=== The Philippines ===
Cordlife Group owns a 99.99% interest in Cordlife Medical Phils., Inc. (“Cordlife Philippines”), through its wholly owned subsidiary CS Cell Technologies Pte. Ltd. Registered with the Department of Health, Cordlife Philippines' ISO-certified and AABB-accredited facility cord blood processing and cryopreservation facility was officially launched in February 2010 with a storage capacity for 20,000 cord blood units. In August 2013, Cordlife Philippines officially launched its newest service, umbilical cord lining banking.

=== Malaysia ===
Established in 2001 and headquartered in Kuala Lumpur, Malaysia's largest cord blood banking operator StemLife, is the first stem cell banking and therapeutics company in Malaysia. Stemlife became a majority-owned subsidiary of Cordlife Group Limited in December 2015. StemLife operates its own 24-hour processing, testing, and cryopreservation facility in central Kuala Lumpur, Malaysia. They have successfully released 16 cord blood units for transplantation and infusion.
