= Rex International Holding =

Oil and gas company

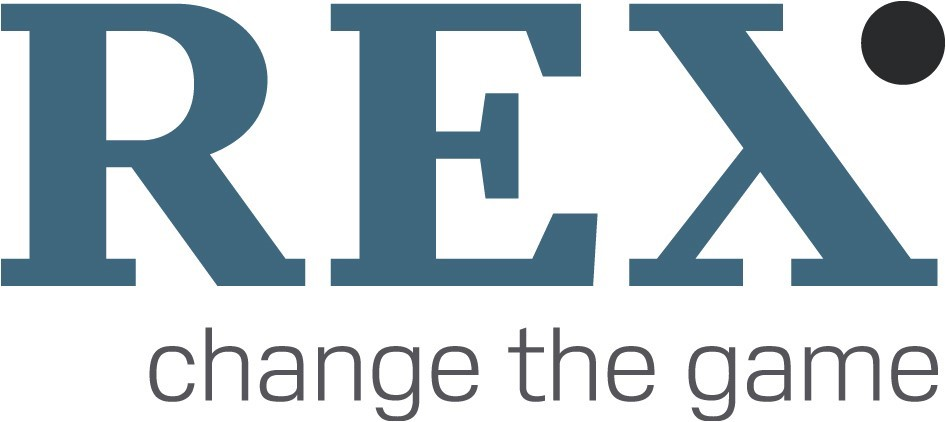
- Company type: Public
- Traded as: SGX: 5WH
- Industry: Oil & Gas
- Headquarters: Singapore
- Key people: John d'Abo, (Executive Chairman); Mans Lidgren, (CEO)
- Products: Rex Virtual Drilling
- Website: https://www.rexih.com

Rex International Holding is an oil and gas company headquartered in Singapore and listed on the Singapore Exchange Securities Trading Limited's Mainboard. The company was publicly listed on 31 July 2013 on Singapore Exchange's secondary board Catalist and started trading on the Singapore Exchange's Mainboard on 8 March 2022.

The Rex Group currently has interests in exploration and production assets in Norway and Oman through its subsidiaries Lime Petroleum AS and Masirah Oil Limited respectively. Masirah Oil Limited holds operatorship for the asset in Oman.

Rex owns Rex Virtual Drilling, which is developed by its Swedish founders. Rex Virtual Drilling is a liquid hydrocarbon indicator that studies resonance information in seismic data, using unique algorithms that create 3D maps that show any correlation with the presence of oil in the ground.

Since its listing in July 2013, the Group has achieved four offshore oil discoveries. As at November 2023, the Group has interests in about 20 offshore licences, including two producing fields – Brage and Yme – in Norway, and 1 offshore concession with a producing field – Yumna Field – in Oman. In December 2023, the Group was awarded a Production Sharing Contract in Benin, West Africa.

== History ==
The company was founded by Karl Lidgren, Hans Lidgen and Svein Kjellesvik. The three then founded Rex Partners, whose subsidiary Rex Commercial and Schroders & Co Bank AG were the initial shareholders of Rex International Holding, a private company incorporated in Singapore on 11 January 2013.

On 31 July 2013, Rex International Holding was listed on the Singapore Exchange Securities Trading Limited's (SGX-ST) Catalyst Board. It is one of the largest company listed on the Catalyst Board.

On 12 December, Rex acquired 100% shareholding interest in Rex Technology Management, owner of a suite of Rex Technologies. The acquisition alleviated concerns the investors had and also allowed the company to hold its key differentiator – Rex Technologies, in the listed entity.

29 May 2019: Lime Petroleum AS completed the divestment of its 30 per cent interests in the Rolvsnes discovery in PL338C, PL338E and its 20 per cent interest in the Goddo prospect in PL815 in Norway for a total consideration of US$45 million.

16 October 2019: Lime Petroleum AS participated (30 percent) in the exploration drilling of the Shrek prospect, which was completed as an oil and gas discovery estimated by the operator to have between 19 and 38 million barrels of recoverable oil equivalents. The partners in the licence would consider tying the discovery into the Skarv facility.

12 July 2020: The Ministry of Oil and Gas in Oman approved the Field Development Plan for the Yumna Field and awarded a Declaration of Commerciality.

2 November 2020: Lime Petroleum AS participated (20%) in the drilling of the Apollonia prospect in PL263D/E, which results in a gas discovery.

17 March 2021: Masirah Oil Limited announced the completion of the upgrade to the Yumna Field process facilities, which has more than doubled the liquid handling capacity on the Mobile Offshore Production Unit (MOPU) to 30,000 barrels per day.

7 April 2021: Lime Petroleum AS signed an agreement with ONE-Dyas Norge AS (“ONE-Dyas”) to swap its 20 percent interests in each of the licenses PL263D, PL263E, and PL263F Sierra (previously known as Apollonia) in the Norwegian Sea for ONE-Dyas’ 13.3 percent interest in PL433 Fogelberg. The transfer of the interests is pending regulatory approval.

8 March 2022: Rex starts trading on the Mainboard of the SGX-ST.

18 April 2022: Lime Petroleum AS acquired 40 per cent interests in licences PL820 S and PL820 SB with the Iving and Evra discoveries in the North Sea.

In 2021, Rex invested in a Singapore-registered commercial drone company, Xer Technologies, as part of its business diversification. In December 2022, Rex entered into an agreement to acquire more shares in Xer Technologies, subject to the achievement of certain technical and sales milestones by Xer. Xer Technologies started in 2011 as an early pioneer in commercial drone flying which now develops, produces and markets customisable heavy-duty Unmanned Aerial System (UAS) solutions.

In 2022, Rex acquired Moroxite T AB, a Sweden-incorporated medical-technology (“med tech”) company, with a focus on hindering solid tumour progression and prevent metastasis. Its protected unique carrier platform for targeted cancer therapy uses a combination of nano and micro apatite particles for local delivery.

== Core Business ==
=== Norway ===
One of the main areas of focus for the company is Norway as it is a mature market with high activity with reputed operators, attractive fiscal policies and good quality seismic data to be analyzed with Rex Virtual Drilling. A lot of Norway's oil production occurs in the North Sea and smaller amounts in the Norwegian Sea. In recent times, new exploration and production activity is occurring in the Barents Sea.

Norway had 7.7 billion barrels of proved crude oil reserves as at 1 January 2022, the largest oil reserves in Western Europe. Other than its abundant crude oil reserves, Norway is a mature market with high activity with reputed operators, attractive fiscal policies and good quality seismic data to be analysed with Rex Virtual Drilling. Most of Norway's oil production occurs in the North Sea and smaller amounts in the Norwegian Sea. In 2021, four new fields (Martin Linge, Solveig, Duva, and Aerfugl Nord) and the redeveloped Yme field contributed to the 5% increase in Norway's annual crude oil production.

Lime Petroleum AS acquired a 10% interest in the Yme Field and 30% interest in licenses in the North Sea (Iving and Evra discoveries) in 2022, following its acquisition of a 33.8434% interest in the producing Brage Field in 2021.

== Subsidiaries ==
=== Masirah Oil Limited ===
Located in the East of the Gulf of Masirah, Block 50 Oman is one of the first concessions secured by the founders of Rex International before its listing. The discovery is significant as it is the first offshore discovery in the area after 30 years of exploration activity. Block 50 spans approximately 17,000 km^{2}.

On 3 February 2014, Masirah Oil Limited, a subsidiary of Rex announced the discovery of oil in Block 50 Oman, an offshore concession, in Gulf of Masirah, east of Oman. The second exploration well that was drilled in the concession had successfully reached its target depth (less than 3,000m) into the Cambrian formation. Hydrocarbons were discovered in several formations with good oil samples extracted. This discovery won Masirah Oil, the Offshore Discovery of the Year award for discovering hydrocarbons in its second offshore exploration well in Block 50 Oman.

=== Lime Petroleum AS ===
On 27 August 2018, The company started the drilling and production testing of the Rolvsnes oil discovery in PL338C, in which Rex's 90 percent subsidiary Lime Petroleum holds a 30 percent interest, was completed successfully with a production rate of up to 7,000 barrels of oil per day (bopd), confirming sustainable commercial oil flow.

On 29 May 2019, Lime Petroleum completed the divestment of its 30 per cent interests in the Rolvsnes discovery in PL338C, PL338E and its 20 per cent interest in the Goddo prospect in PL815 in Norway for a total consideration of US$45 million.

In April 2022, Lime Petroleum applied as an operator on the Norwegian Continental Shelf and was pre-qualified on 30 March 2023 by the Norwegian Ministry of Petroleum and Energy.

In August 2022, Lime Petroleum went into an agreement with KUFPEC Norway to buy its 10 percent interest in the Yme field, located in the Norwegian North Sea. The acquisition was completed in December.

=== Xer Technologies ===
Xer Technologies develops and builds ‘new-generation’ drones to target clients in areas such as infrastructure, inspection, search and rescue operations, public safety and additional applications.

=== Moroxite T AB ===
Moroxite T is a medical technology (“med-tech”) company that is developing a new system for targeted delivery of anti-tumour drugs using bone minerals as a recruiting platform to treat osteosarcoma, a type of bone cancer.

== Technologies ==
Karl Lidgren and Hans Lidgen, two of the three founders of Rex International Holding developed Rex Technologies. The proprietary exploration technologies have the ability to predict the location of liquid hydrocarbons.

=== Rex Virtual Drilling ===
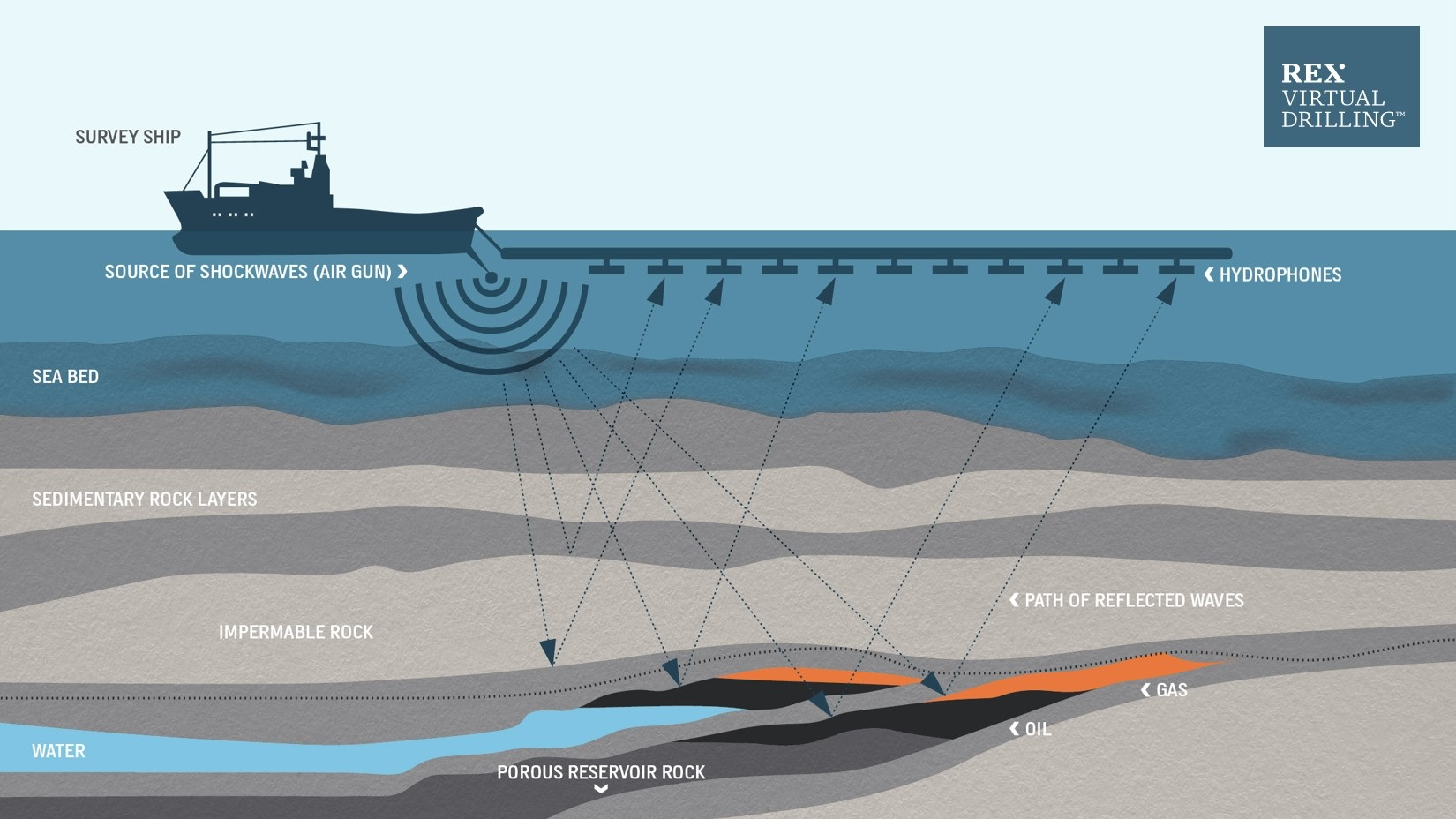
Rex Virtual Drilling

Rex Virtual Drilling is used to detect liquid hydrocarbon accumulations using seismic data interpretation techniques. On 9 February 2015, the company announced that it had developed an improved version of Rex Virtual Drilling. This second-generation RVD has improved depth resolution in the analysis of seismic data. This allows for correlation with conventional geological studies. The technology has since been enhanced with added features such as dispersion analysis for further accuracy and data processing optimisation.

=== Rex Gravity ===
Rex Gravity is an exploration technology that finds areas with suitable geological conditions for hydrocarbon accumulations.

=== Rex Seepage ===
Rex Seepage works together with Rex Gravity. Rex Seepage was developed to spot offshore oil seepages in order to better understand the potential presence of oil reservoirs.
