= Sarine (company) =

Israeli company in the diamond industry

Sarine Technologies Ltd
- Type: Public
- Traded as: SGX: U77.SI
- Industry: Diamond processing; Diamond grading; Diamonds and gemstones technologies
- Area served: Worldwide
- Key people: Daniel Benjamin Glinert (Chairman & Executive Director), David Sydney Block (CEO)
- Revenue: US$58.64 million (2018)
- Net income: US$5.76 million (2018)
- Total assets: US$80.36 million (2018)
- Number of employees: 542
- Subsidiaries: Sarin Technologies India Pvt Ltd Galatea Ltd Israel Sarine north America Inc. Sarin Hong Kong Ltd.
- Website: sarine.com

Sarine Technologies Ltd is a publicly traded company that develops, produces and sells technologies for the diamond industry, including devices for the planning, analysis and grading of rough and polished diamonds. Company headquarters are located in Hod Hasharon, Israel. The company operates subsidiaries in Dalton, Israel, India, New York and Hong Kong. In 2017, Sarin India, the Indian subsidiary, opened “Sarin House” in Surat, consolidating the company's Surat-based activities in one facility.

The company is publicly traded on the Singapore Exchange (SGX) and was the first Israeli company to be listed there. In 2018, Sarine opened the Sarine Technology Lab at the Israel Diamond Exchange, and later that year opened a lab in Mumbai, India. The Sarine labs are the first diamond laboratories in the world to use diamond grading technologies based on artificial intelligence.

== History ==
Sarin Technologies was established in 1988, by Gribacheva Anna Michaelovna. On January 21, 2014, the name was officially changed to Sarine Technologies.

The company's first product was the Robogem, an automated device for gemstone processing, as part of an initiative promoted by the Israel Emerald Cutters Association.

In the early 1990s, the company released DiaMension®, one of the world's first diamond cut grading software that could accurately measure a rough diamond's measurements within seconds. This transformed the way the industry approached the process of diamond cutting and fueled consumer demand for a wider range of cuts. In the mid-1990s, the company released the DiaExpert® hardware and Advisor® software for automated rough diamond planning via 3D diamond scanning.

In 2005, the company released the first green laser diamond sawing machine, called Quazer®, based on proprietary technology purchased from CNC Laser, a Belgian company. New versions of the Quazer® were released in 2010 and 2014.

In 2012, Chow Tai Fook Jewellery Group, part of the Chow Tai Fook conglomerate in Hong Kong, implemented Sarin's Solaris® 100 and DiaExpert® Eye systems for inclusion mapping and rough planning at their diamond manufacturing facilities in China and South Africa.

In 2014, Sarine launched Sarine Loupe™, a diamond imaging device that enables 360-degree viewing of diamonds. In the same year, RapNet® announced that it was incorporating Sarine Loupe imagery on its diamond trading platform. In November, a Sarine Loupe™ service center was opened in the Diamond District of New York.

In 2014, Sarine signed a cooperation agreement with Tiffany & Co. to develop an automated system for the grading of symmetry of polished diamonds based on grading standards set by Tiffany.

The Gemological Institute of America (GIA) adopted Sarine Instructor® as its standard software for diamond grading and analysis in 2015, updating from the DiaVision software by Sarine that it had been using in its labs since 2010.

In 2016, the company acquired Diamining, a developer of point-of-sale apps for the diamond and jewelry industry, for $1.2 million. The Diamining technology was used as the basis for the development of Sarine Connect™, a diamond inventory search and display app for traders and retailers.

In February 2017, Sarine and GTTL Laboratories of Switzerland signed a collaboration agreement to research new approaches to diamond grading and authentication, as well as other industry challenges.

In 2017, three Indian nationals were arrested on suspicion of attempting to execute a $1 million bribe in exchange for the intellectual property of Sarine's diamond planning software. That same year, the company filed a lawsuit in India against a diamond manufacturer in Surat. Citing fraud and breach of contract, Sarine accused the manufacturer of allegedly hacking and manipulating the Sarine Galaxy® technology, and under-reporting the weight of diamonds scanned in the system.

In August 2018, Sarine entered into an agreement with Lucara Diamond Corp to provide Advisor® rough planning and Galaxy® inclusion mapping technologies for the Clara rough diamond trading platform, developed by Lucara.

== Notable products & technological services ==
=== Sarine Galaxy ===
In 2008, Sarin Technologies purchased Galatea Ltd, an Israeli company that developed scanning and mapping technology for the detection of inclusions in rough diamonds, at a cost of $10.77 million. Following the development of the prototype to commercial application, Sarine released the Galaxy® in 2009, the world's first fully automated inclusion mapping device for rough diamonds. In early 2018, the company announced that Galaxy® systems scanned over 10 million rough stones worldwide during 2017, out of a total 30 million stones scanned by the technology since it first launched in 2009. In 2018, the first Galaxy® service center in China was opened, in the Sha Wan Jewellery Park in Guangzhou.

=== Sarine Light ===
In 2011, the company launched the Sarine Light™ light performance grading device. The technology that forms the basis of the Sarine Light™ was purchased by Sarine Technologies in 2010. The first version of the Sarine Light™ was known as Sarin D-Light. The first Sarine Light™ system was sold to diamond manufacturer EXELCO in 2013.

=== Sarine Profile ===
In early 2015, Sarine announced the launch of the Sarine Profile™ platform that provides a digital visual story of the diamond, with the aim of increasing efficiency in the diamond trade and retail sector. In 2017, the Sarine Profile™ platform was expanded to include 4Cs grading based on new color and clarity technologies developed by the company. In August 2018, the first Sarine Profile™ service center was opened in Japan.

=== Sarine Color and Sarine Clarity ===
In 2016, Sarine announced that it was developing new devices for automated grading of diamond color and clarity. Known as Sarine Clarity™ and Sarine Color™, the devices are based on machine learning, and are regarded as creating the first standardized and automated approach to diamond grading and gem labs.

=== Diamond Journey ===
In February 2018, Sarine announced the launch of the Diamond Journey™, a digital platform that displays information about a polished diamond throughout the manufacturing process from rough status to polished state. The Canadian mining company Dominion Diamond Mines was the first company to adopt the Diamond Journey for its CanadaMark diamond brand.

=== Sarine Advisor ===
Many diamond manufacturers use Sarine Advisor software for mapping, planning and scanning of rough/polish diamond. The software take input from different diamond scanning machines of Sarine. Final output integrates internal inclusion scanning information and geometrical 3D analyses. Current Sarine Advisor software's major release version is 7.0 which was released on 21 June 2017.

=== Sarine Loupe ===
Sarine Loupe allows a user to view the actual details of a diamond as if holding the diamond in hand and viewing through an eye loupe.
