= Asiatravel.com =

Company

Asiatravel.com Holdings LTD
- Company type: Public (SGX: 5AM )
- Industry: Online Travel Reservation
- Founded: 1995
- Defunct: October 2018
- Headquarters: Singapore
- Key people: Boh Tuang Poh (Executive Chairman and CEO)
- Products: Online Hotel Reservation; Online Flight Reservation; Online Holiday Packages
- Number of employees: 300+
- Website: asiatravel.com

Asiatravel.com was a pan-Asia online hotel and travel agency. It was supported by a network of operation and customer services offices in Singapore, Malaysia, Indonesia, Thailand, Philippines, Hong Kong, China and UAE.

== Overview ==
It began as a hotel reservation service, and later expanded into a provider of other travel reservation services including flights, tours and hotels. The company offered discounted airfares for all major airlines, which could be booked on an instant confirmation basis.

Asia Travel is listed on the Singapore Exchange since 2001, but trading on its symbol was suspended as of July 2018. It established a B2B division consisting of TAcentre.com and Savio-Staff-Travel, which serviced the hospitality industry and corporate sectors.

== See also ==
- Agoda
