= Special settlement (securities) =

Special settlements in the securities markets exist for OTC trades. It allows a settlement day to be chosen at the time of trading which is outside of the market norms. This is often used to allow financing of short term positions outside of the traders ability.

There is no cap on SS periods as these are completely bilateral agreements but market makers and brokers will normally charge or alter the price of the securities for facilitating these sorts of deals.

For example: On 1 August an investor believes that the value of the securities will go up in two weeks time on the back of a favourable announcement however the investor has no free funds with which to make an investment. By buying on 1 August for settlement on 14 August (depending on the market and asset but the norm would be 3 August) the investor has locked into the 1st of August price without having to pay for it for two weeks. On the 12th the investor will quite often sell his position, thus, on the 14th his positions net to zero and he will receive the cash difference (or have to pay) depending on the stocks performance over the 12-day period.

This is an excellent way of investing short term in the market without having any assets or by investing in the market in a larger size than normally possible for limited assets. Corporate clients use SS for a variety of reasons normally associated with expected events, derivatives or FX maturities.

This may also be done as a sale should the short-seller believe the stock is going to do down.
