= OTC clearing =

OTC clearing refers to a process under which standardized derivative contracts which relate to over-the-counter transactions will be cleared through an agency established by a stock or commodities exchange.

== Purpose ==
The point of OTC clearing is to avoid having the effect of financial shocks amplified through means not supervised by the agencies, to encourage transparency of the pricing of these standardized financial products, and to mitigate credit and default risks associated with over-the-counter trading.
