= Singapore Exchange =

Investment holding company in Singapore

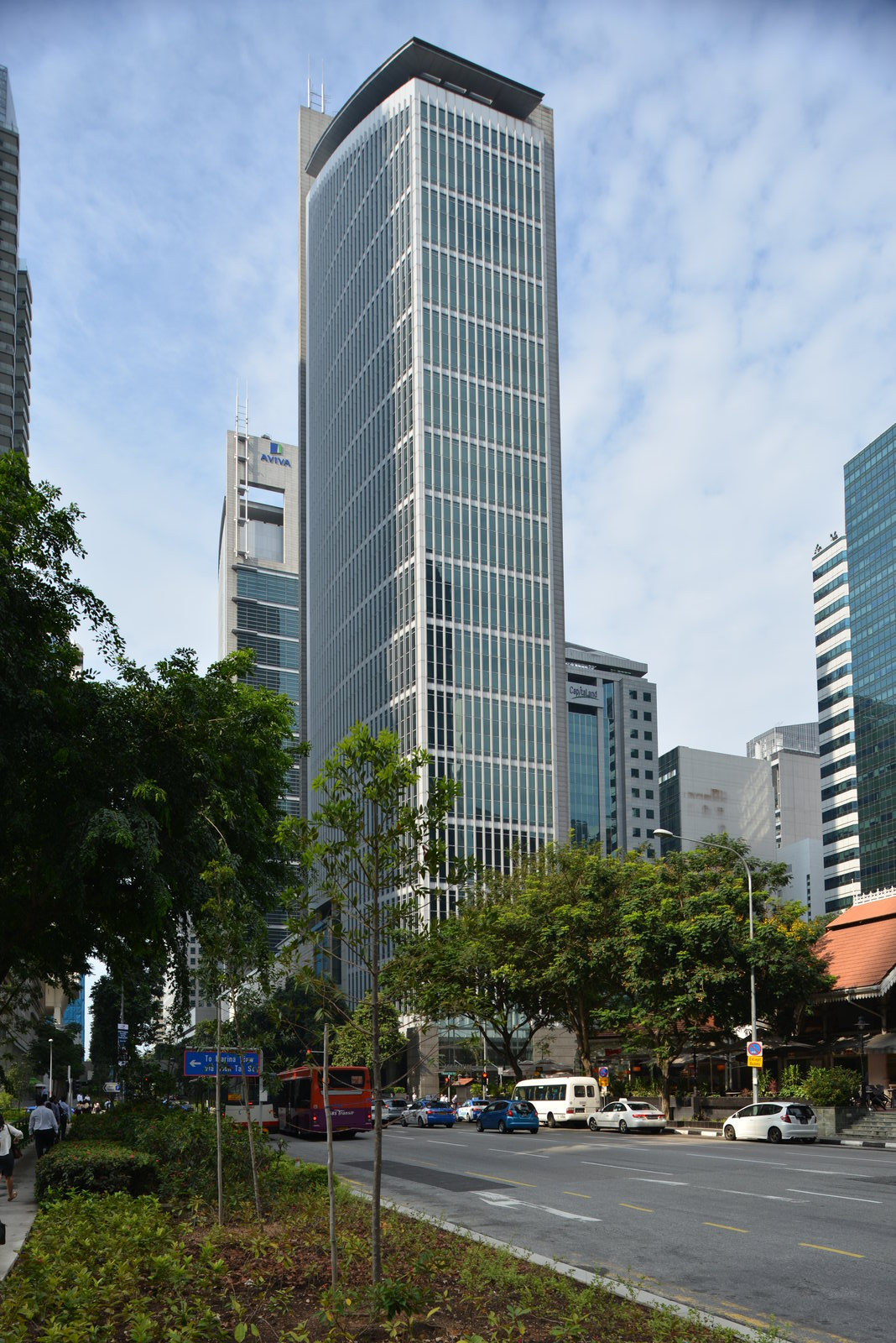
- Type: Stock exchange
- Location: SGX Centre, Singapore
- Coordinates: 1.279042°N 103.849750°E
- Founded: 1 December 1999; 26 years ago
- Key people: Koh Boon Hwee (Chairman); Loh Boon Chye (CEO)
- Currency: Singapore dollar & US dollar
- No. of listings: 776
- Market cap: US$644.806 billion
- Website: www.sgx.com

Singapore Exchange Limited
- Traded as: SGX: S68
- Headquarters: Singapore
- Website: www.sgxgroup.com

Singapore Exchange Limited (SGX Group) is a Singapore-based exchange conglomerate, operating equity, fixed income, currency and commodity markets. It provides a range of listing, trading, clearing, settlement, depository and data services. SGX Group is also a member of the World Federation of Exchanges and the Asian and Oceanian Stock Exchanges Federation. It is ASEAN's second largest market capitalization after Indonesia Stock Exchange at US$609.653 billion as of September 2023.

== History ==
SGX was formed on 1 December 1999 as a holding company. The share capital of some former exchange companies, namely Stock Exchange of Singapore (SES), Singapore International Monetary Exchange (SIMEX) that was founded in 1984 and Securities Clearing and Computer Services Pte Ltd (SCCS) were cancelled and new shares issued in these companies were fully paid up by SGX. In this way, all assets previously owned by these three companies were transferred to SGX. The shareholders previously holding shares in SES, SIMEX and SCCS received newly issued SGX shares.

On 23 November 2000, SGX became the third exchange in Asia-Pacific to be listed via a public offer and a private placement after Australian Securities Exchange; which listed in 1998 and Hong Kong Stock Exchange earlier in 2000. Listed on its own bourse, the SGX stock is a component of benchmark indices such as the MSCI Singapore Free Index and the Straits Times Index.

In May 2006, SGX launched Asia's first over-the-counter (OTC) clearing platform named SGX AsiaClear for a suite of OTC derivative products to reduce counter-party risks and increase liquidity. It introduced OTC trade registration and clearing for a wide range of forward freight agreements (FFA), and oil swaps. Shortly thereafter, it launched the world's first clearing and settlement of iron ore swaps and has since become the world's largest clearer of iron swaps.

On 25 September 2006, the Joint Asian Derivatives Exchange (JADE), a joint venture between SGX and Chicago Board of Trade (CBOT) became operational. However, this joint venture was cancelled in November 2007, with CME Groups selling of its 50% stake in the joint venture to SGX. The contracts previously traded on JADE were transferred to SGX's QUEST trading platform.

In March 2007, SGX bought a 5% stake in Bombay Stock Exchange for 42.7 million dollars.

On 15 June 2007, Tokyo Stock Exchange, Inc. announced that it had acquired a 4.99% stake in SGX. Since then the value of the shares has declined and the Tokyo Stock Exchange, Inc. has made a decision to sell the shares it holds in SGX to its parent company, the Tokyo Stock Exchange Group, Inc.

On 31 January 2008, SGX acquired a 20% stake in Philippine Dealing System Holdings Corp, which has become an associated company of SGX.

On 18 April 2008, SGX opened a representative office in Beijing.

At the beginning of 2008, SGX reached an agreement to buy at least 95% of Singapore Commodity Exchange. On 30 June 2008, SGX completed the acquisition of Singapore Commodity Exchange Ltd (SICOM), which now is a 100% subsidiary.

In August 2009, SGX formed a joint venture with Chi-X Global, called Chi-East. At the beginning of October 2010, this joint venture received approval from the Monetary Authority of Singapore to operate a dark pool trading platform.

On 8 June 2010, SGX announced it has opened an office in London. This is part of SGXs move to invest S$250 million into its Reach initiative. By implementing this initiative, SGX plans to create the world's fastest trading engine and a data centre as well as further connecting trading communities in the world to Singapore. The new trading platform, SGX Reach, will be delivered to SGX by NASDAQ OMX, Voltaire and HP. This platform is based on GENIUM, a trading platform developed by NASDAQ OMX.

In November 2016, the Singapore Exchange (SGX) acquired the Baltic Exchange, headquartered in London.

In February 2011, SGX has entered a partnership with NASDAQ OMX to provide a suite of tools and solutions for companies, which is designed to support listed companies in Asia.

SGX plans to introduce dual currency trading of securities, which includes stocks, bonds and other listed investments in two different denominations, the Singapore and US dollar on 2 April 2012.

In October 2013, excessive speculation led to the sharp price fall of three mainboard stocks, Blumont Group Ltd, Asiasons Capital Ltd. and LionGold Corp. SGX and the Monetary Authority of Singapore (MAS) launched a review of activities around the three stocks, and in February 2014 jointly issued a consultation paper setting out a number of enhancements to strengthen the securities market and protect investors from speculative and market manipulative behaviour. Enhancements included implementing a minimum trading price for mainboard listed issuers, requiring reporting of short positions and the creation of three independent regulatory bodies.

On September 6, 2016, the Singapore Exchange joined the United Nations' Sustainable Stock Exchanges initiative.

On 6 February 2018, the Singapore Exchange (SGX) and Bursa Malaysia announced a proposed stock market trading link which will be operational by end-2018. The new link will allow investors to conduct trading of shares in an efficient manner. In addition to trading, the link will cover the clearing and settlement of traded stocks, procedures required for post-trading arrangements. Before the launch of the link, cross-border supervisory and enforcement arrangements will be worked upon by the Monetary Authority of Singapore and Securities Commission Malaysia. After the results of the 2018 Malaysian general election, plans for the stock market link were put on hold.

On 21 January 2020, Singapore Exchange (SGX) was listed in the Bloomberg Gender-Equality Index (GEI) for the first time in recognition of gender equality, as well as its commitment to diversity and board representation.

In July 2026, SGX introduced its first Singapore Depository Receipts based on United States-listed companies, covering Grab, Sea and SpaceX. Trading began on 22 July in Singapore dollars during local market hours. The launch expanded SGX's depositary-receipt programme to 38 instruments based on securities traded in Thailand, Hong Kong, Indonesia and the United States.

=== Merger talks ===
SGX was in merger talks with Australian Securities Exchange (ASX), which would have created a bourse with a market value of US$14 billion had the deal been successful. The Australian Competition & Consumer Commission said on 15 December 2010 that it would not oppose SGXs takeover of ASX.

SGX's plans to buy ASX have drawn criticism from the Tokyo Stock Exchange, which is the second largest shareholder in SGX. A representative of the TSE said SGX's bid for ASX "would flag off a race to consolidate". TSE chief Atsushi Saito fears isolation of the Tokyo Stock Exchange as a result of the takeover.

SGX revised its initial takeover proposal in an attempt to overcome some of the opposition to the plans. This would have decreased the number of Singaporean citizens on the board of the combined company and would have given addition seats to Australians. However, on 8 April 2011, the Treasurer of Australia, Wayne Swan, made the decision to block the merger between the two exchanges. Upon the announcement that the federal government would block the merger, SGX retracted its bid for ASX shares and decided to seek growth opportunities elsewhere.

As of July 2012, SGX was in merger talks with the London Stock Exchange (LSE) and the two exchanges already signed a cross trading agreement. However, on 20 July, SGX said there are no plans for a takeover of or merger with LSE.

== Structure ==
SGX operates several different divisions, each responsible for handling specific businesses.

- SGX ETS (Electronic Trading System): provides global trading access to SGX markets where 80 per cent of the customers are from outside Singapore.
- SGX DT (Derivatives Trading): provides derivatives trading.
- SGX ST (Securities Trading): provides securities trading.
- SGX DC (Derivatives Clearing): subsidiary for clearing and settlement operations.
- SGX AsiaClear: offers clearing services for over-the-counter (OTC) oil swaps and forward freight agreements.
- SGX Reach: an electronic trading platform.
- Central Depository Pte Ltd: subsidiary responsible for securities clearing, settlement and depository services.
- Asian Gateway Investments Pte Ltd: wholly owned subsidiary
- Singapore Exchange IT Solutions Pte Ltd: provides computer services and maintenance as well as software maintenance

== Listing ==
The companies listed on SGX belong to one of two groups: the companies listed on the SGX Mainboard and the companies listed on SGX NASDAQ. In order to be listed on the mainboard, a company has to fulfill some requirements set forth by SGX, while a listing on NASDAQ is not tied to the fulfilment of any additional conditions. SESDAQ was replaced on 26 November 2007 by the SGX Catalist after an extensive study of other market models and a public consultation in May 2007. The word "Catalist" is an amalgamation of the words "Catalyst" and "List", to reflect the idea that the Catalist board could be used as a catalyst to propel growth upon listing. Catalist differs from SESDAQ primarily through its sponsor-based regulatory model, under which an approved sponsor determines a prospective company's suitability for listing after due diligence and continues to advise the issuer on listing compliance and corporate governance matters, rather than relying on direct exchange assessment.

== Trading system ==
The exchange launched SGX QUEST (SGX Quotation and Execution System) in August 2004. The system is used by the exchange for derivatives and securities trading.

== Financial performance ==
As of 31 January 2010, SGX had 774 listed companies with a combined market capitalisation of S$650 billion. The revenues of SGX are mainly from the securities market (75%) and derivatives market (25%).

SGX reported a net profit of $165.8 million for the first half of its financial year 2010. Excluding non-recurring items, net profit was 7% higher compared to 1H FY2009 ($159.2 million). In the second quarter of the financial year 2010, excluding the non-recurring items, net profit of $77.0 million was 3% higher than a year ago. Operating revenue increased 6% to $324.0 million (1H FY2009: $304.9 million).

== Corporate governance code ==
Numerous guidelines are set to be shifted to SGX Listing Rules. At least one-third of the board members are to be independent directors. The shareholding threshold for assessing director independence has been lowered to 5% from 10%. A director will no longer be independent if he or any immediate family member is a substantial shareholder with a 5% stake or more. Relationships between chairman and CEO must be disclosed if they are immediate family members. There will be a proposed 9 year limit on independent directors as a hard limit, or the appointment of independent directors who have served more than nine years to be put to an annual vote requiring approval from majority of all shareholders and majority of non-controlling shareholders, with a transition period of three years to be provided regardless of the option adopted. Directors must be submitted for renomination and reappointment at least once every three years. If dividends are not paid, companies must state the reason.

== Companies listed ==
As of June 2026, there were 601 listed companies (excluding GDRs, Hedge Funds and Debt Securities) on the Singapore Exchange with a total market capitalisation of SGD 1.129 trillion.

	June 2026
Domestic listings	392
Foreign listings (excluding China)	141
China listings	68
Total listings	601

== Major shareholders ==
The following are top 10 largest shareholders of Singapore Exchange Ltd as of 30 June 2022:

1. SEL Holdings Pte Ltd – 23.41%
2. Citibank Nominees Singapore Pte Ltd – 16.09%
3. DBSN Services Pte Ltd – 10.88%
4. Raffles Nominees (Pte) Limited – 9.65%
5. HSBC (Singapore) Nominees Pte Ltd – 8.42%
6. DBS Nominees (Private) Limited – 5.42%
7. Phillip Securities Pte Ltd – 1.41%
8. BPSS Nominees Singapore (Pte) Ltd – 1.03%
9. United Overseas Bank Nominees (Private) Limited – 0.69%
10. CGS-CIMB Securities (Singapore) Pte Ltd – 0.38%

== See also ==
- List of ASEAN stock exchanges by market capitalization
- List of stock exchanges in the Commonwealth of Nations
- Asia-Pacific Central Securities Depository Group
