= Consular agencies of Albania =

The Republic of Albania has 45 consular agencies and honorary consulate generals. The consular agencies are led by honorary consulates. The purpose of the consular agency is to maintain various aspects of bilateral relations between Albania and the host country. They do not handle visa related matters. The purpose the honorary consulate general, (or consulate general), however, is to lead the consular agencies. The difference is not specified in this table.

Foreign overseas territories are included.

== Current agencies ==
=== Asia ===
Host country	Host city	Embassy with jurisdiction	Ref.
Cyprus	Larnaca	Athens, Greece	
Israel	Eilat	Tel Aviv, Israel	
Japan	Chiba	Tokyo, Japan	
Japan	Fukuoka	Tokyo, Japan	
Oman	Muscat	Riyadh, Saudi Arabia	
Pakistan	Islamabad	Ankara, Türkiye	
Pakistan	Karachi	Ankara, Türkiye	
Philippines	Manila	Tokyo, Japan	
Türkiye	Istanbul	Ankara, Turkey	
Türkiye	İzmir	Ankara, Turkey	
Türkiye	İzmit	Ankara, Turkey	

=== Europe ===
Host country	Host city	Embassy with jurisdiction	Ref.
Austria	Bad Vöslau	Vienna, Austria	
Bosnia and Herzegovina	Sarajevo	Zagreb, Croatia	
Bulgaria	Plovdiv	Sofia, Bulgaria	
Croatia	Dubrovnik	Zagreb, Croatia	
Croatia	Osijek	Zagreb, Croatia	
Croatia	Rijeka	Zagreb, Croatia	
Croatia	Varaždin	Zagreb, Croatia	
Croatia	Zadar	Zagreb, Croatia	
Denmark	Hellerup	Copenhagen, Denmark	
Estonia	Tallinn	Warsaw, Poland	
Finland	Helsinki	Stockholm, Sweden	
France	Bordeaux	Paris, France	
France	Toulouse	Paris, France	
Germany	Elmshorn	Berlin, Germany	
Germany	Essen	Berlin, Germany	
Germany	Frankfurt	Berlin, Germany	
Germany	Würzburg	Berlin, Germany	
Hungary	Debrecen	Budapest, Hungary	
Hungary	Pécs	Budapest, Hungary	
Italy	Ancona	Rome, Italy	
Italy	Bologna	Rome, Italy	
Italy	Cosenza	Rome, Italy	
Italy	Genoa	Rome, Italy	
Italy	Modena	Rome, Italy	
Italy	Pistoia	Rome, Italy	
Lithuania	Vilnius	Warsaw, Poland	
Luxembourg	Luxembourg City	Brussels, Belgium	
Netherlands	Alkmaar	The Hauge, Netherlands	
North Macedonia	Bitola	Skopje, North Macedonia	
Poland	Łódź	Warsaw, Poland	
Romania	Constanța	Bucharest, Romania	
San Marino	City of San Marino	Rome, Italy	
Switzerland	Zurich	Bern, Switzerland	
Ukraine	Kharkiv	Warsaw, Poland	

== See also ==
- Diplomatic missions of Albania
