= List of diplomatic missions of Albania =

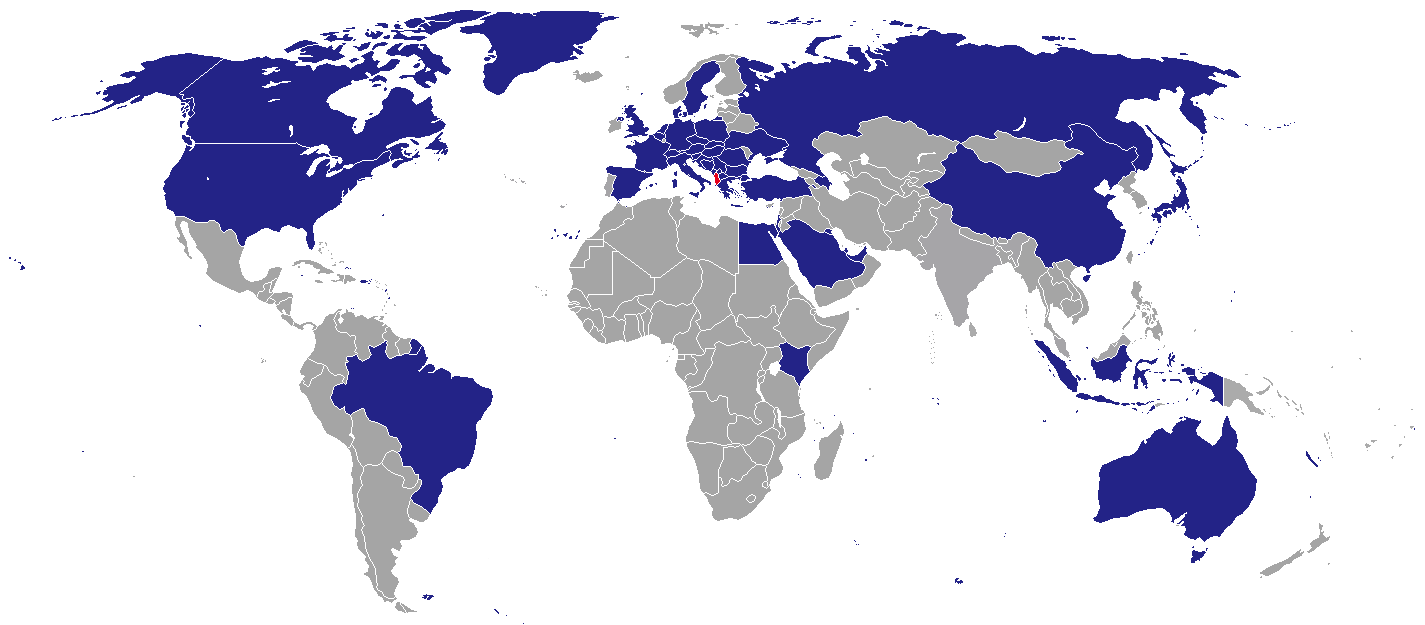
Map showing the countries with Albanian missions.

The Republic of Albania has diplomatic missions in 44 countries and 6 permanent missions accredited to various different international organizations around the world. Most of its missions are concentrated in Europe, particularly in Central Europe and the Balkans, with which the country shares historic and cultural links.

Honorary consulates are excluded from this listing.

== History ==
After the 2013 elections, Foreign Minister Ditmir Bushati announced that the government would close a part of their diplomatic missions due to an economic crisis. Consequently the embassies in Kuala Lumpur, Lisbon, Sarajevo, and New Delhi were closed.

In 2024, the Foreign Ministry announced plans of opening embassies in Jakarta and Nairobi, as well as reopening embassies in New Delhi and Sarajevo.

== Current missions ==
=== Africa ===
Host country	Host city	Mission	Concurrent accreditation	Ref.
Egypt	Cairo	Embassy	Countries: Jordan; Libya; Palestine; Lebanon; Syria; Sudan	
Kenya	Nairobi	Embassy		

=== Americas ===
Host country	Host city	Mission	Concurrent accreditation	Ref.
Brazil	Brasília	Embassy	Countries: Argentina; Colombia; Ecuador; Paraguay; Peru; Uruguay	
Canada	Ottawa	Embassy	International Organizations: International Civil Aviation Organization	
United States	Washington, D.C.	Embassy	Countries: Costa Rica; Dominican Republic; Guatemala; Mexico; Panama; International Organizations: Organization of American States (Note: Accredited as an observer mission.)	
United States	New York City	Consulate-General	Countries: Costa Rica; Dominican Republic; Guatemala; Mexico; Panama; International Organizations: Organization of American States	

=== Asia ===
Host country	Host city	Mission	Concurrent accreditation	Ref.
Azerbaijan	Baku	Embassy		
China	Beijing	Embassy	Countries: Bangladesh; Mongolia; North Korea; Thailand; Vietnam	
Indonesia	Jakarta	Embassy		
Israel	Tel Aviv	Embassy		
Japan	Tokyo	Embassy	Countries: Malaysia; Philippines; Singapore; South Korea	
Kuwait	Kuwait City	Embassy	Countries: Iraq	
Qatar	Doha	Embassy		
Saudi Arabia	Riyadh	Embassy	Countries: Bahrain; Oman; Yemen; International Organizations: Organisation of Islamic Cooperation	
Turkey	Ankara	Embassy	Countries: Afghanistan; Georgia; Kazakhstan; Kyrgyzstan; Pakistan	
Turkey	Istanbul	Consulate-General	Countries: Afghanistan; Georgia; Kazakhstan; Kyrgyzstan; Pakistan	
United Arab Emirates	Abu Dhabi	Embassy		

=== Europe ===
Host country	Host city	Mission	Concurrent accreditation	Ref.
Austria	Vienna	Embassy		
Belgium	Brussels	Embassy	Countries: Luxembourg	
Bosnia and Herzegovina	Sarajevo	Embassy		
Bulgaria	Sofia	Embassy	Countries: Moldova	
Croatia	Zagreb	Embassy		
Czechia	Prague	Embassy		
Denmark	Copenhagen	Embassy		
France	Paris	Embassy	Countries: Monaco; International Organizations: International Organisation of La Francophonie	
Germany	Berlin	Embassy		
Germany	Munich	Consulate-General		
Greece	Athens	Embassy	Countries: Armenia; Cyprus; Tunisia	
Greece	Ioannina	Consulate-General	Countries: Armenia; Cyprus; Tunisia	
Greece	Thessaloniki	Consulate-General	Countries: Armenia; Cyprus; Tunisia	
Holy See	Rome	Embassy (Note: The Albanian Embassy to the Holy See is located outside Vatican territory in Rome.)	Sovereign Entity: Sovereign Military Order of Malta	
Hungary	Budapest	Embassy		
Italy	Rome	Embassy	Countries: Malta; San Marino; International Organizations: Food and Agriculture Organization; International Fund for Agricultural Development; World Food Programme	
Italy	Bari	Consulate-General	Countries: Malta; San Marino; International Organizations: Food and Agriculture Organization; International Fund for Agricultural Development; World Food Programme	
Italy	Milan	Consulate-General	Countries: Malta; San Marino; International Organizations: Food and Agriculture Organization; International Fund for Agricultural Development; World Food Programme	
Kosovo	Pristina	Embassy		
Montenegro	Podgorica	Embassy		
Montenegro	Ulcinj	Consulate-General		
Netherlands	The Hague	Embassy	International Organizations: Organisation for the Prohibition of Chemical Weapons	
North Macedonia	Skopje	Embassy		
North Macedonia	Struga	Consulate-General		
Poland	Warsaw	Embassy	Countries: Estonia; Latvia; Lithuania	
Romania	Bucharest	Embassy		
Russia	Moscow	Embassy	Countries: Belarus; Uzbekistan	
Serbia	Belgrade	Embassy		
Slovakia	Bratislava	Embassy		
Slovenia	Ljubljana	Embassy		
Spain	Madrid	Embassy	Countries: Andorra; Mauritania; Morocco	
Sweden	Stockholm	Embassy	Countries: Finland; Iceland; Norway	
Switzerland	Bern	Embassy	Countries: Liechtenstein	
Ukraine	Kyiv	Embassy		
United Kingdom	London	Embassy	Countries: Ireland; International Organizations: International Maritime Organization	

=== Oceania ===
Host country	Host city	Mission	Concurrent accreditation	Ref.
Australia	Canberra	Embassy		

=== Multilateral organizations ===
Organization	Host city	Host country	Mission	Concurrent accreditation	Ref.
Council of Europe	Strasbourg	France	Permanent Mission		
European Union	Brussels	Belgium	Permanent Mission		
NATO	Brussels	Belgium	Permanent Delegation		
United Nations	New York City	United States	Permanent Mission	Countries: Cuba	
United Nations	Geneva	Switzerland	Permanent Mission	International Organizations: Conference on Disarmament; International Organization for Migration; International Telecommunication Union; United Nations Conference on Trade and Development; World Intellectual Property Organization; World Meteorological Organization; World Trade Organization	
United Nations	Vienna	Austria	Permanent Mission	International Organizations: Organization for Security and Co-operation in Europe	
UNESCO	Paris	France	Permanent Mission		

== Gallery ==
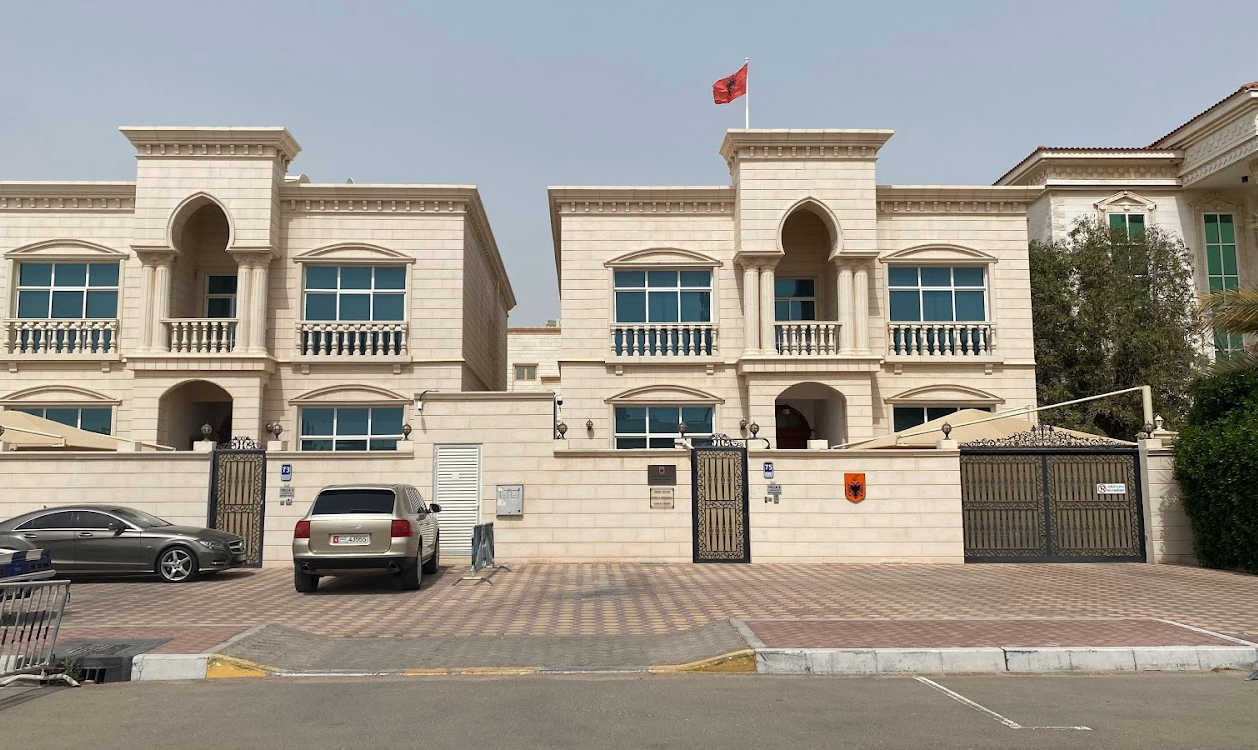
Embassy in Abu Dhabi

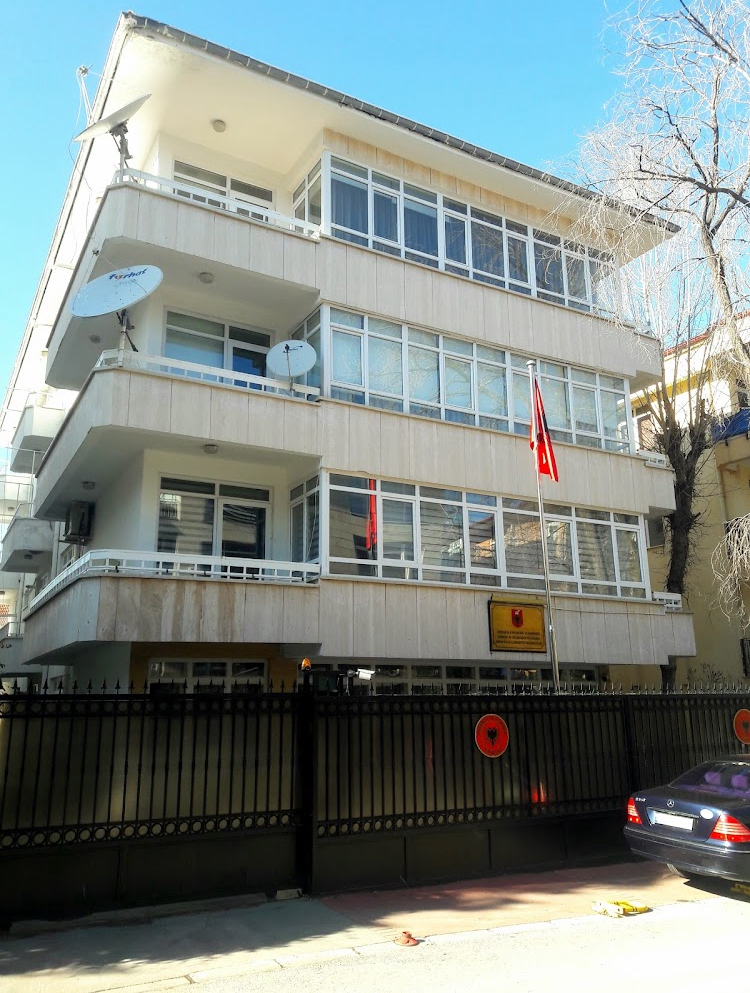
Embassy in Ankara

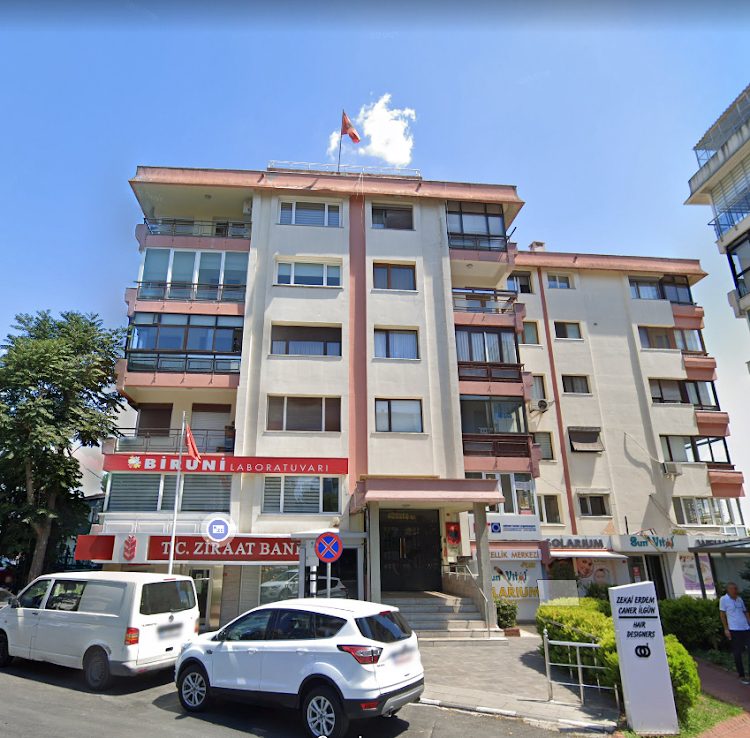
Building hosting the Consulate-General in Istanbul

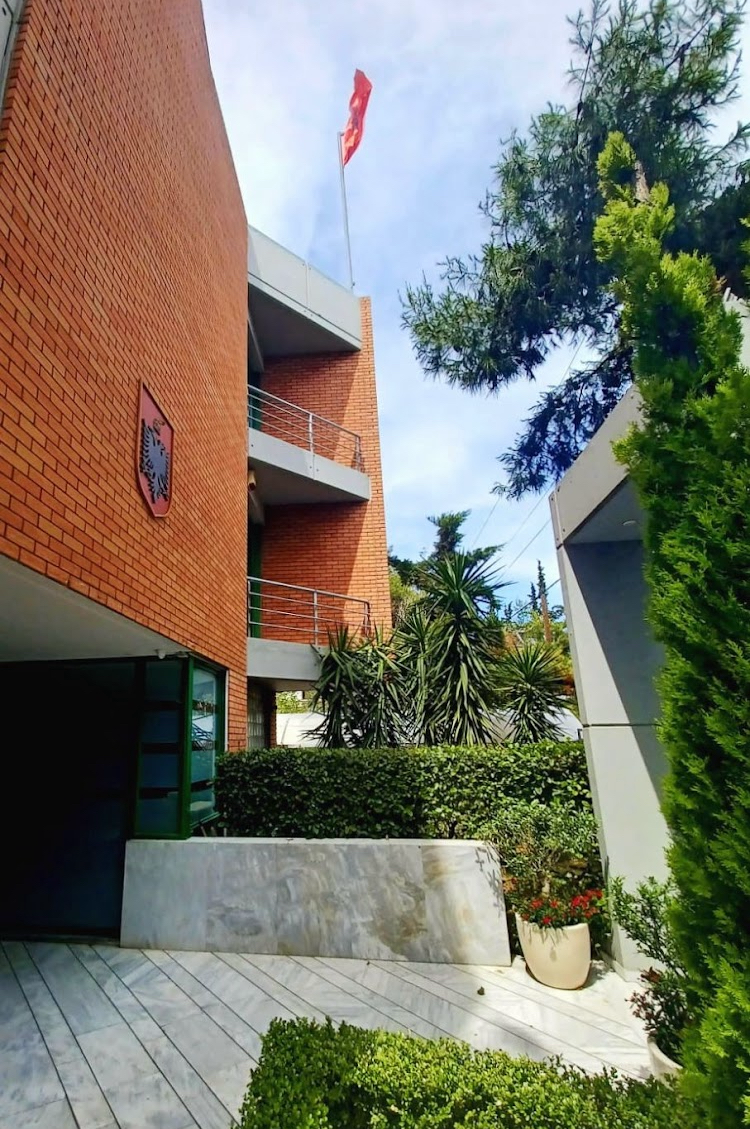
Embassy in Athens

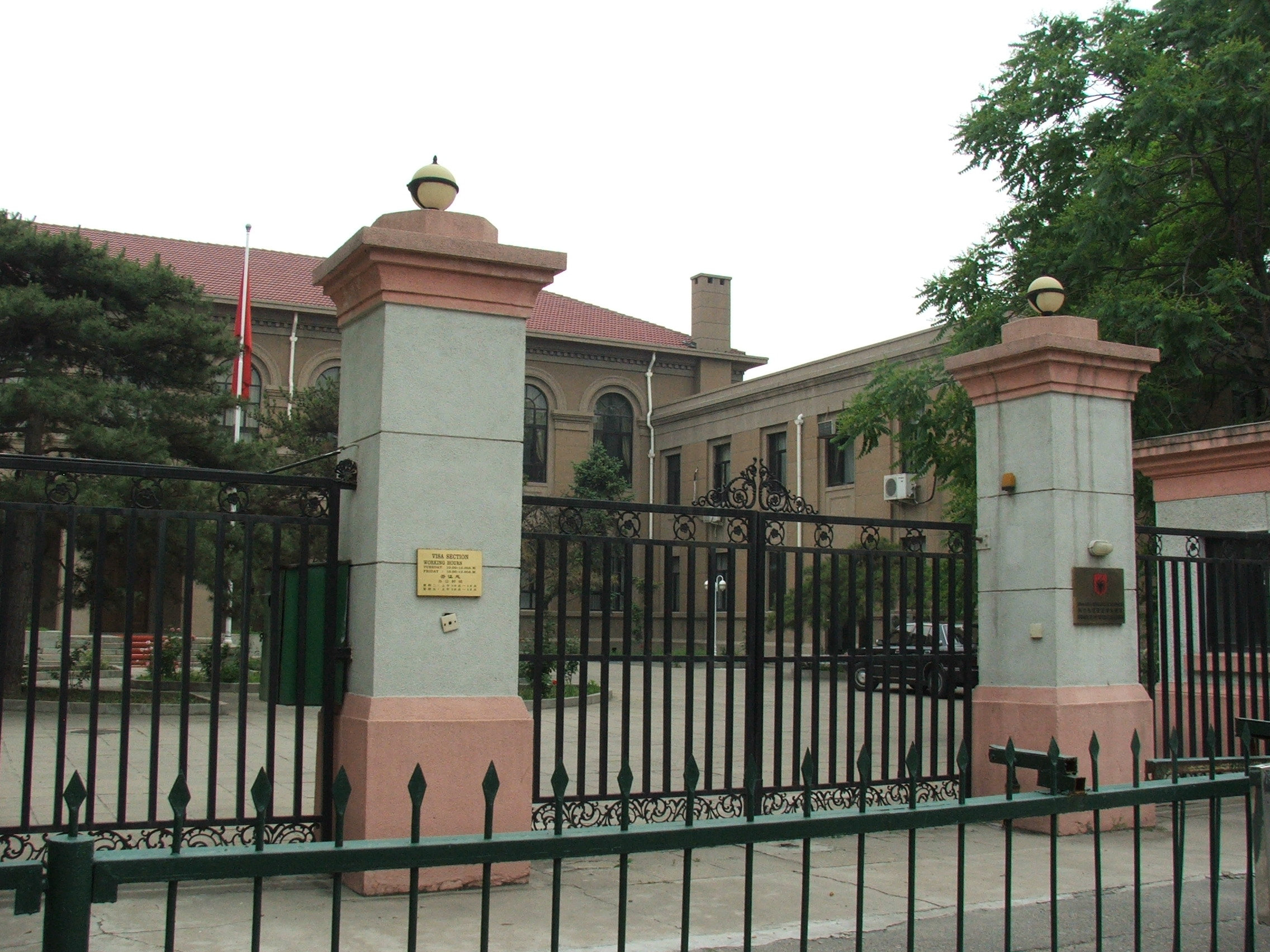
Embassy in Beijing

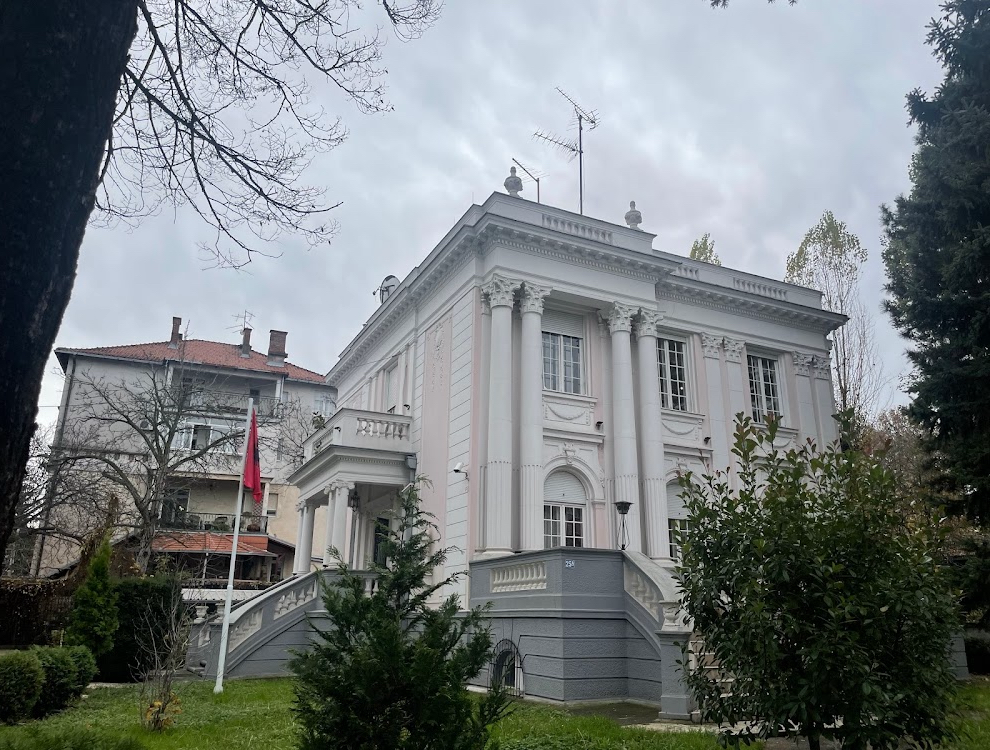
Embassy in Belgrade

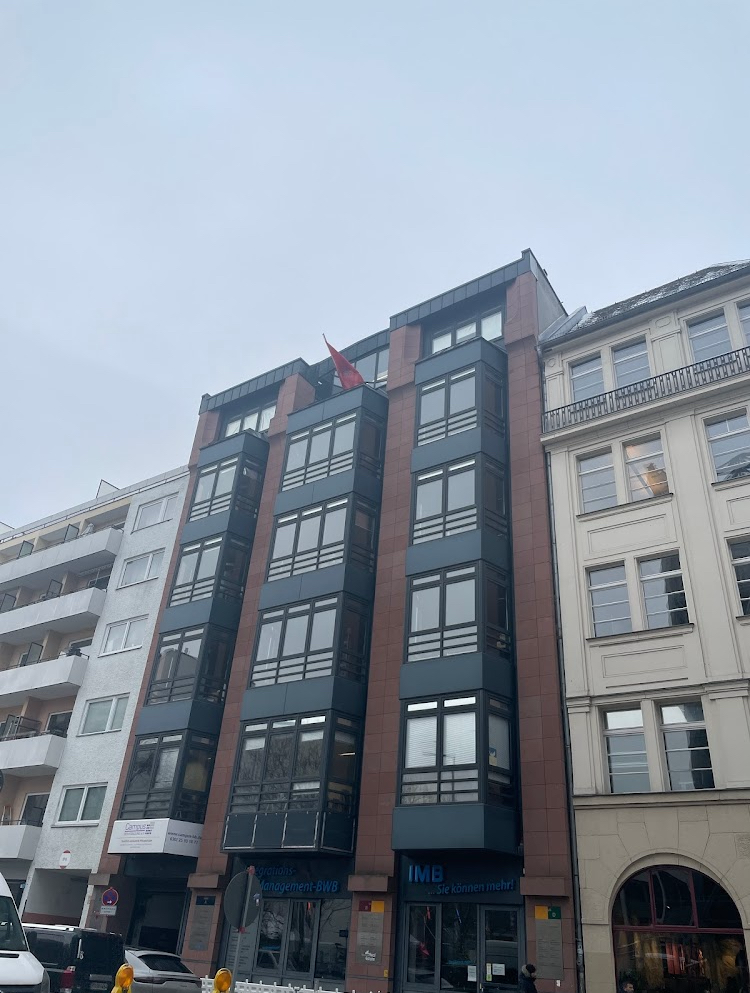
Building hosting the Embassy in Berlin

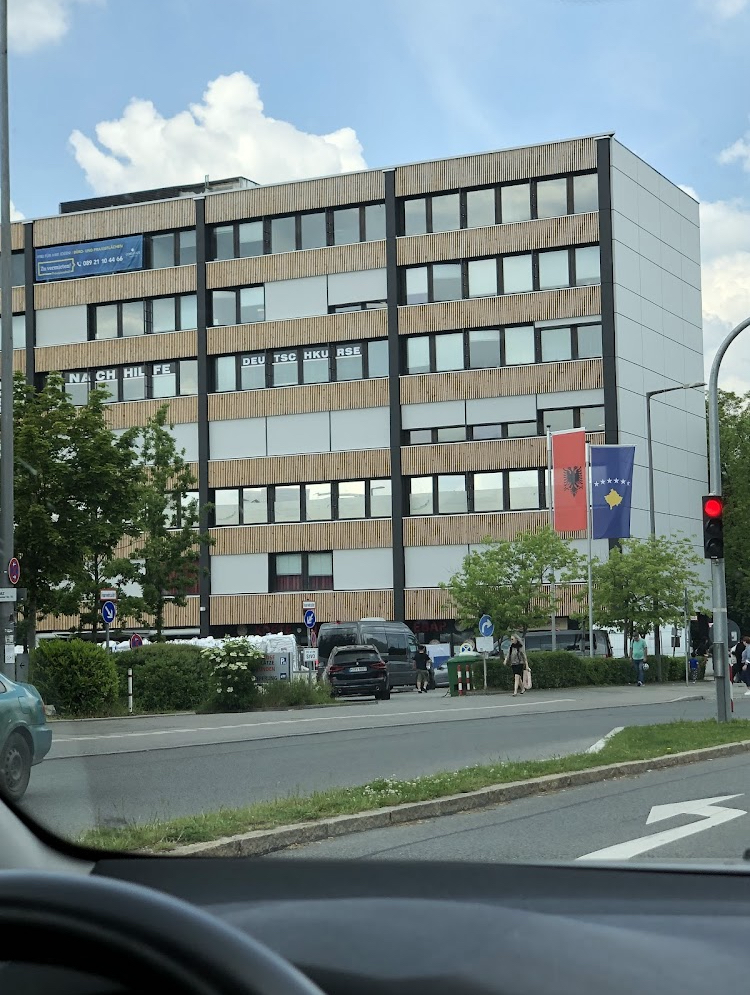
Building hosting the Consulate-General in Munich

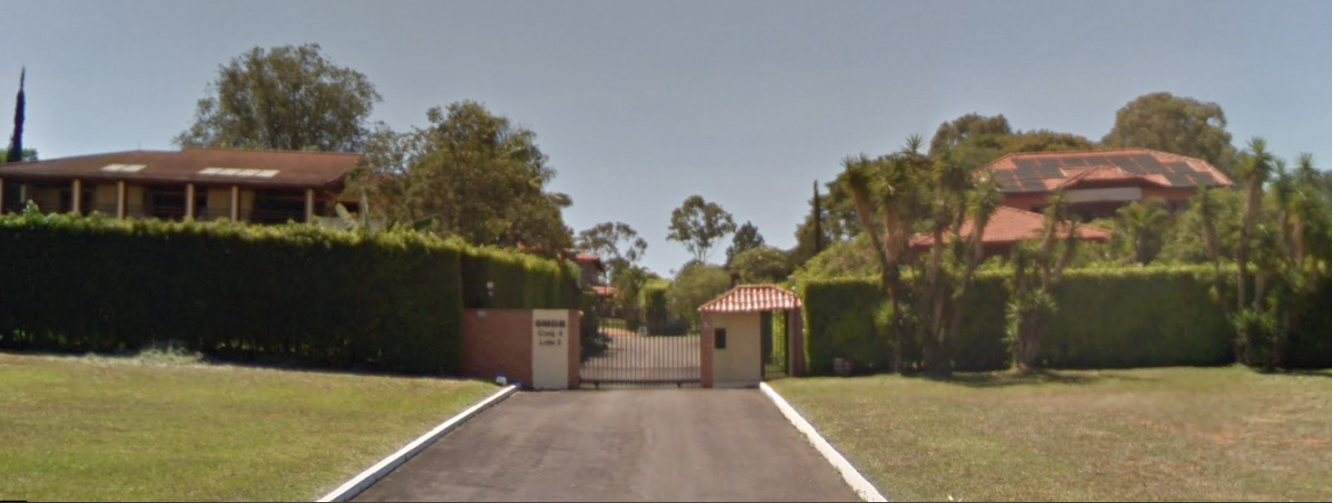
Embassy in Brasília

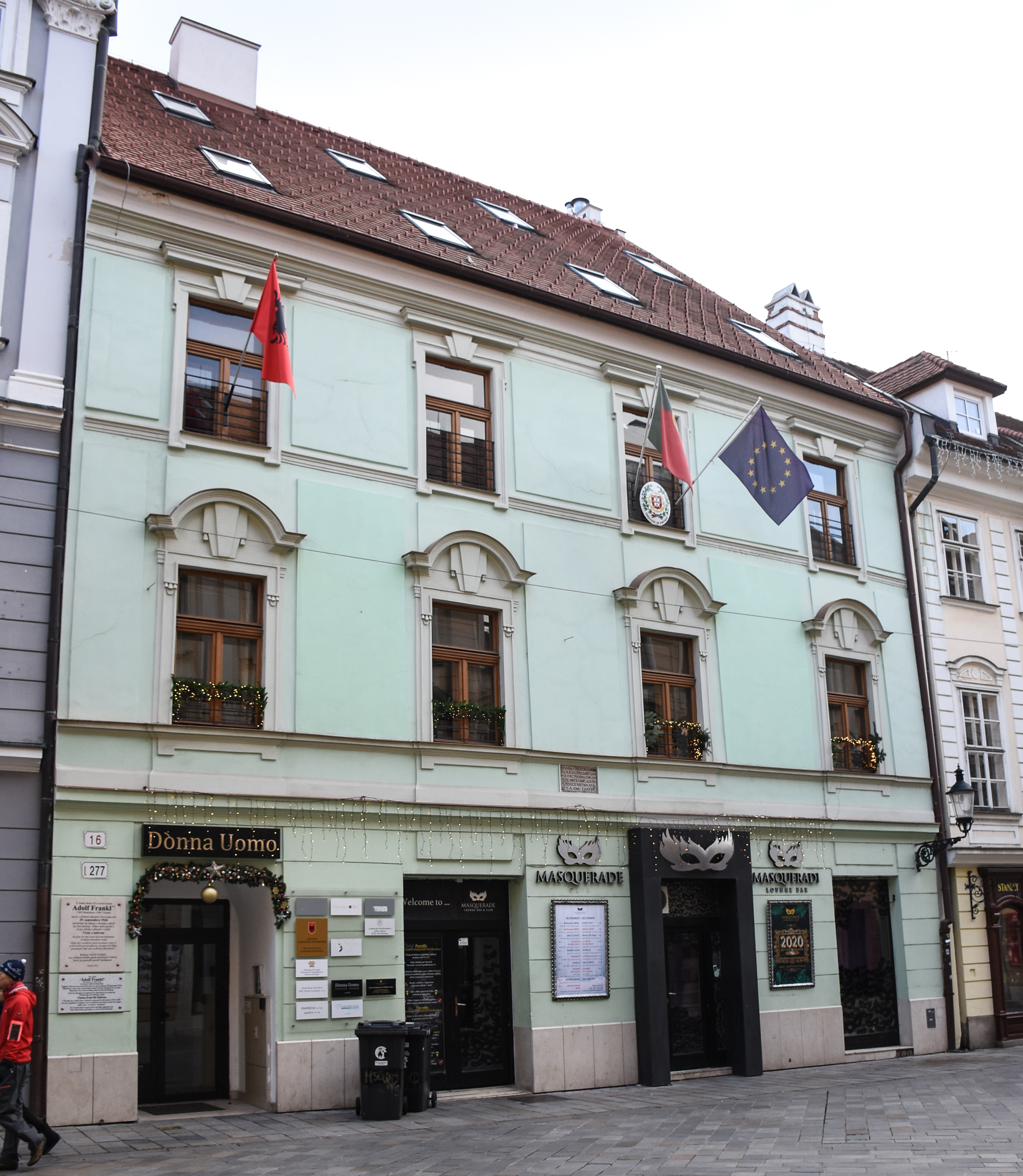
Building hosting the Embassy in Bratislava

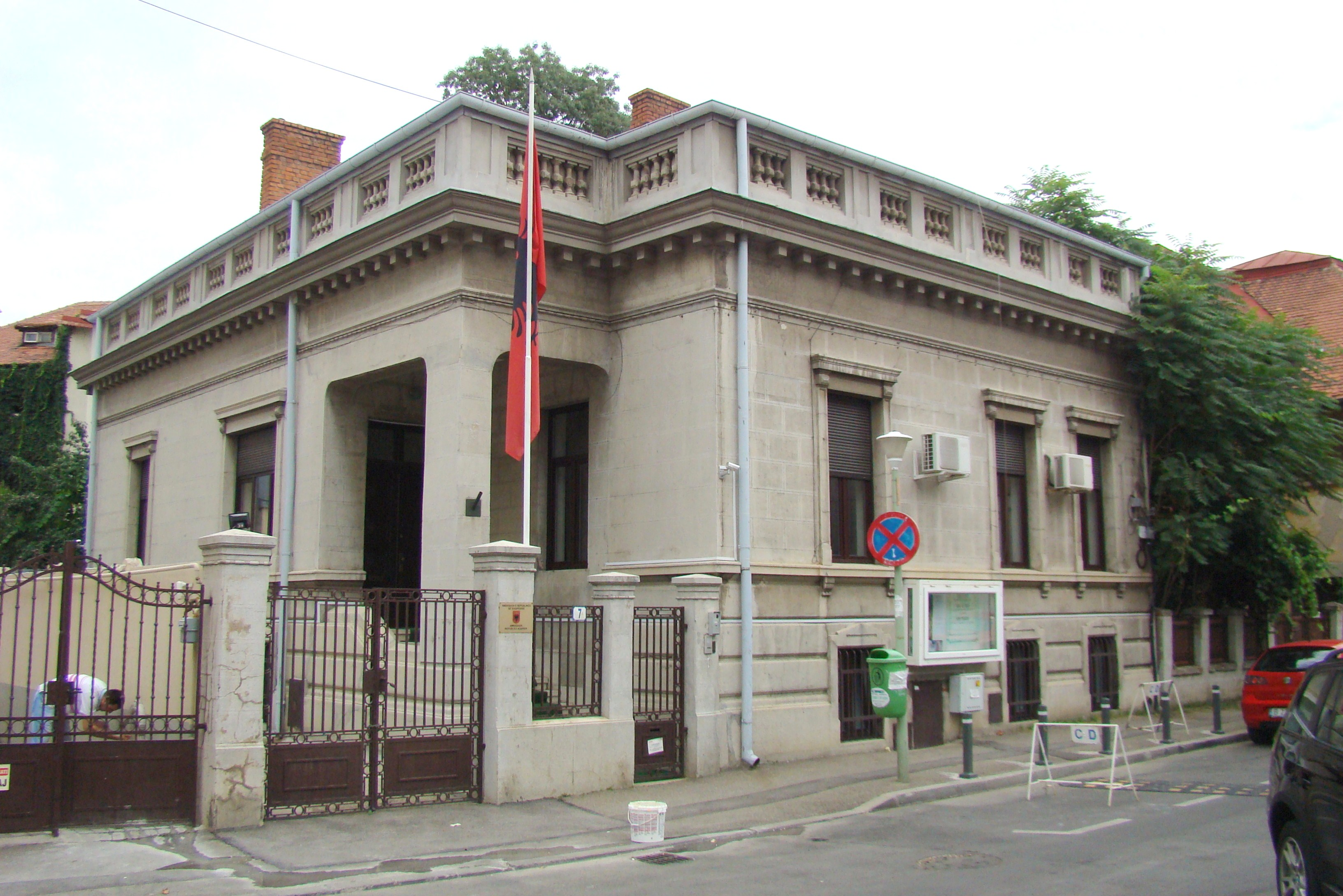
Embassy in Bucharest

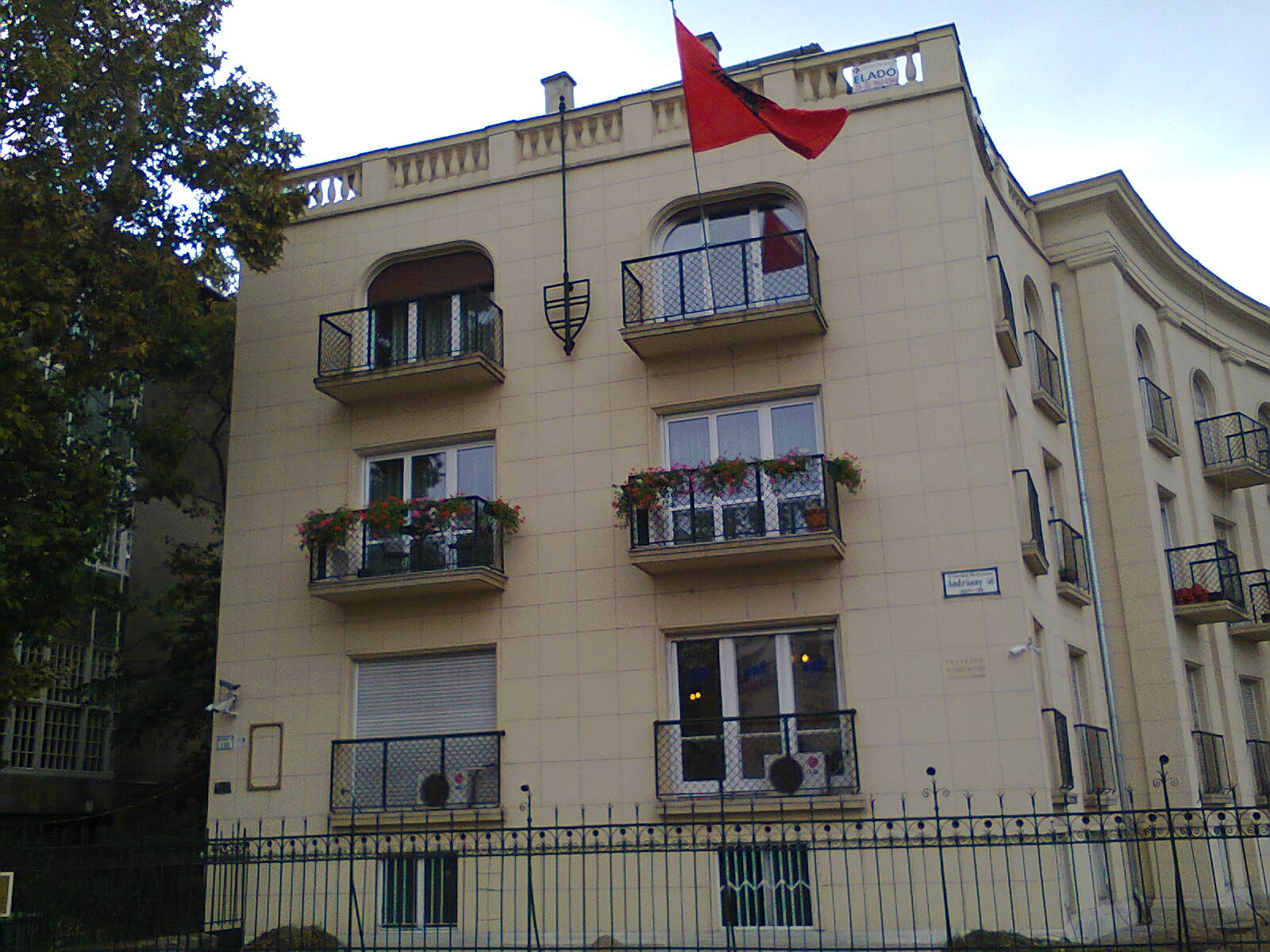
Embassy in Budapest

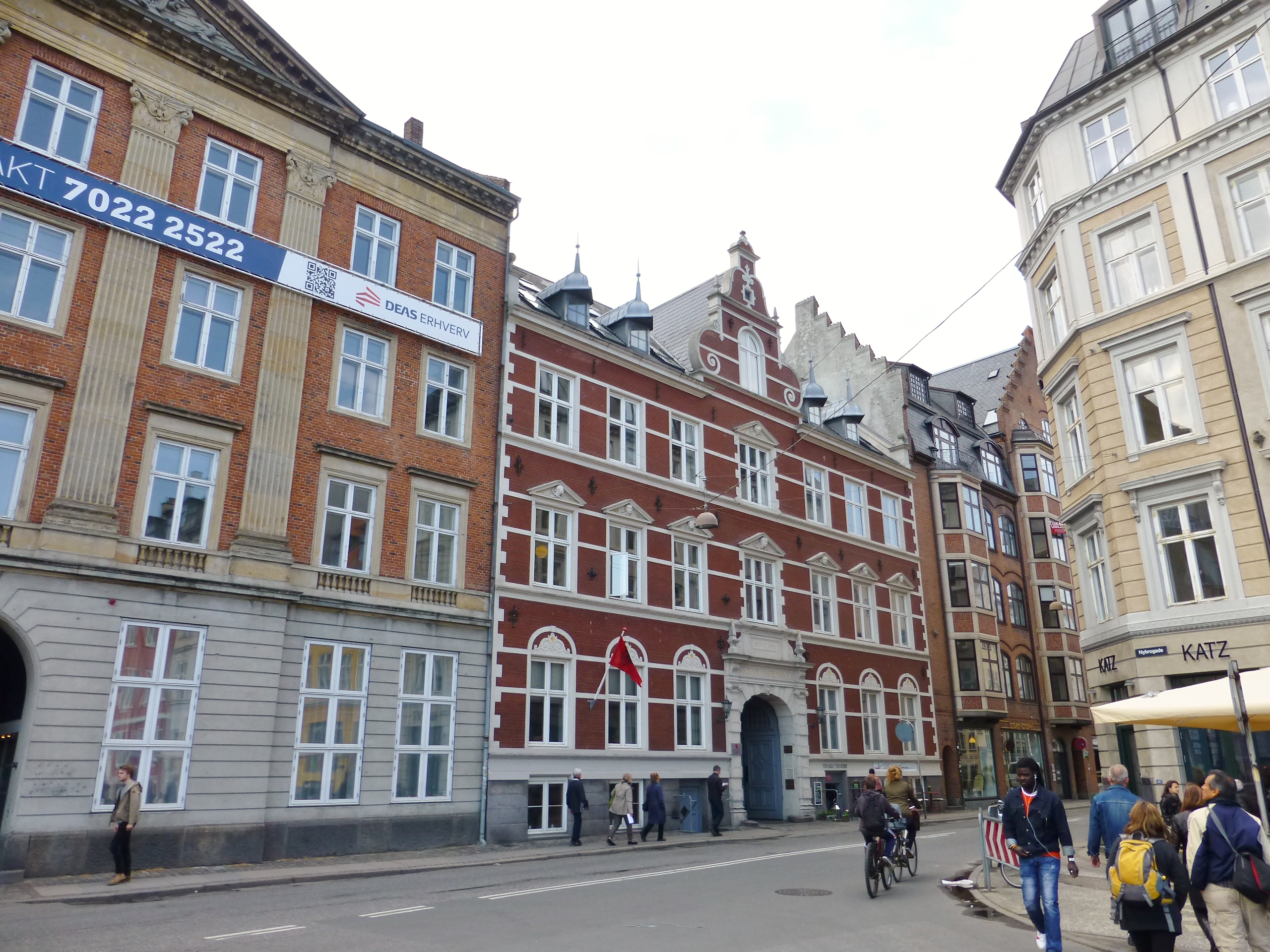
Building hosting the Embassy in Copenhagen

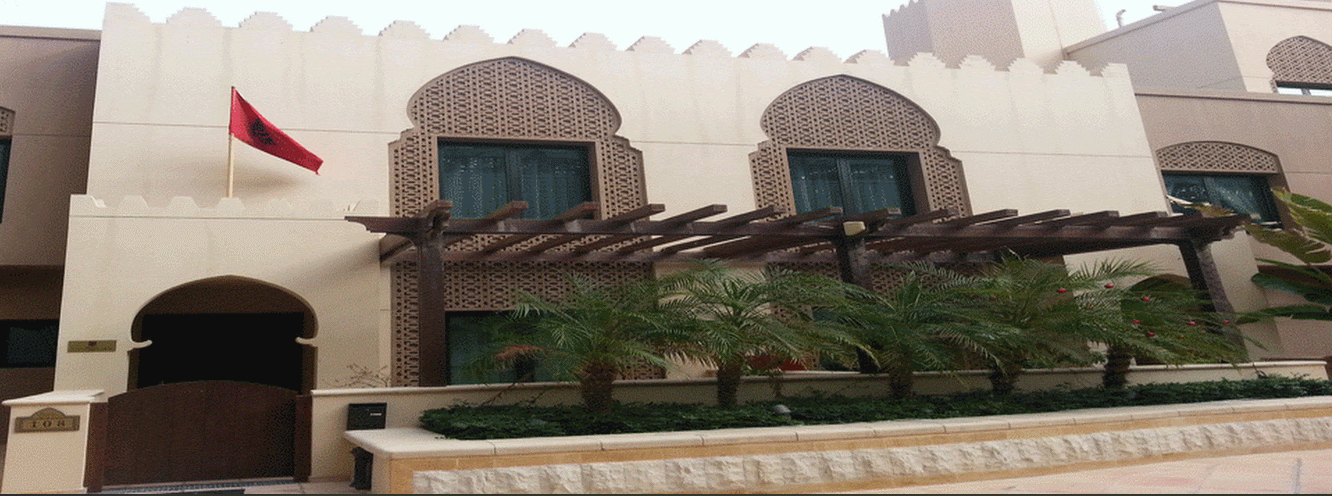
Embassy in Doha

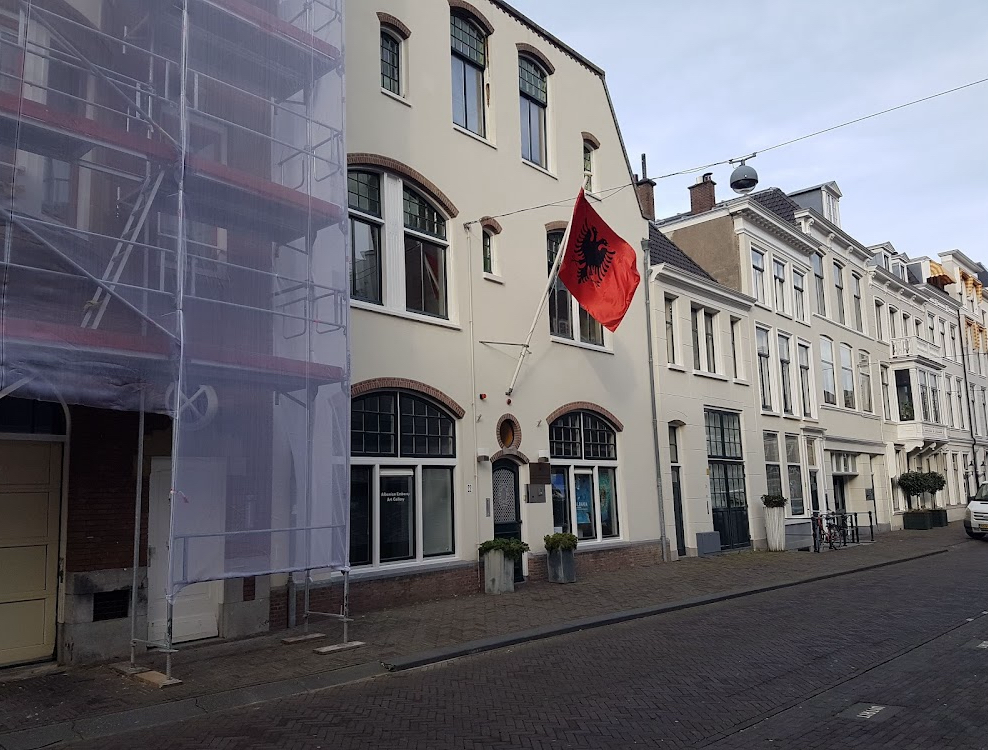
Embassy in The Hague

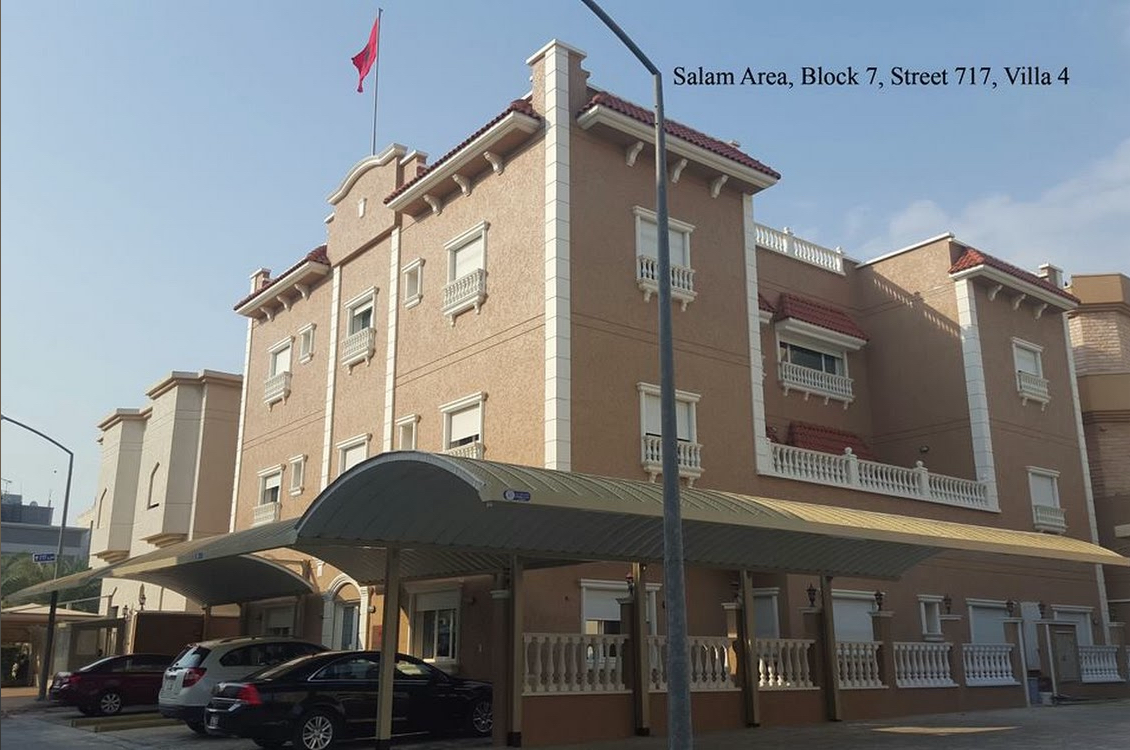
Embassy in Kuwait City

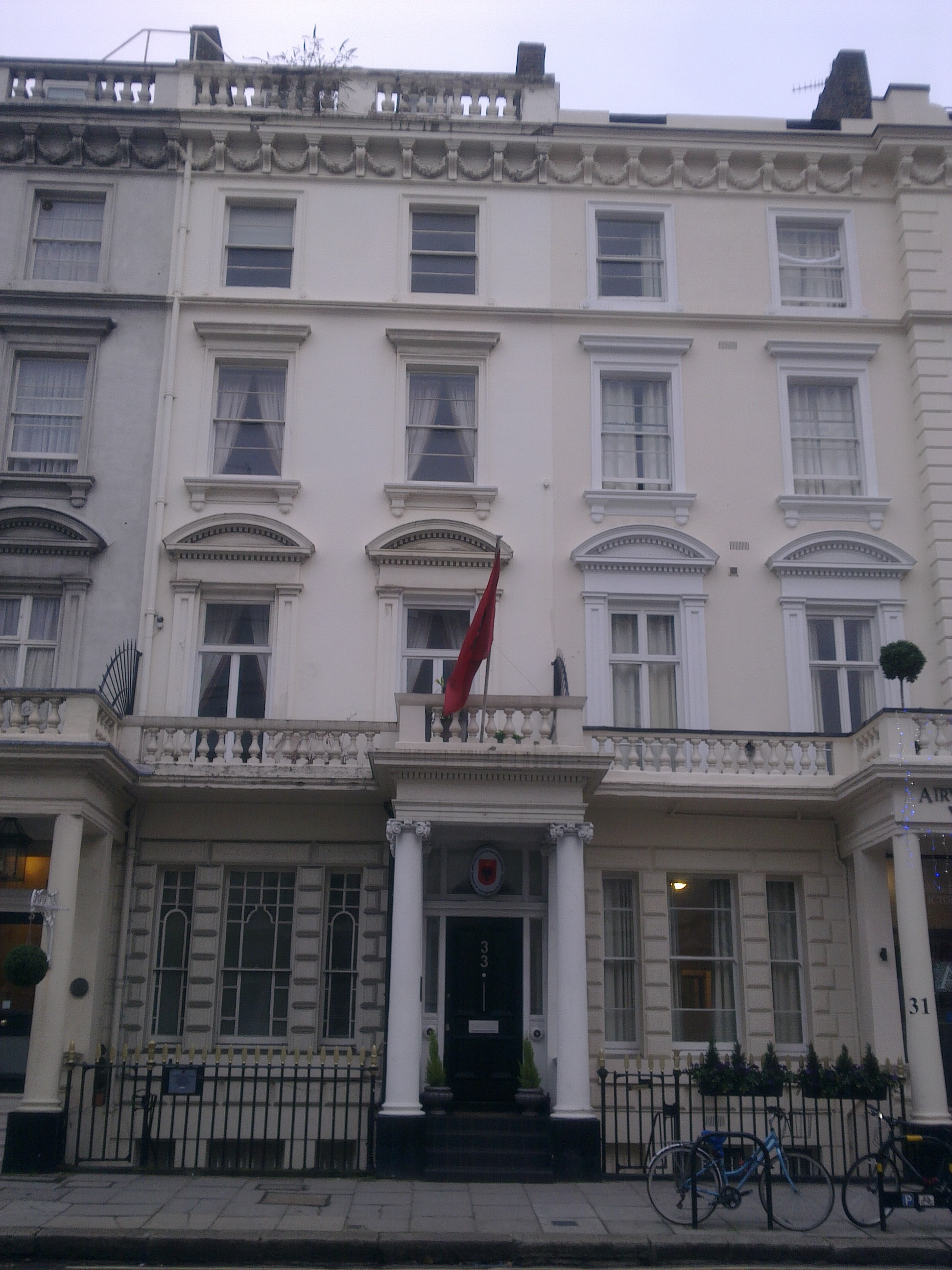
Embassy in London

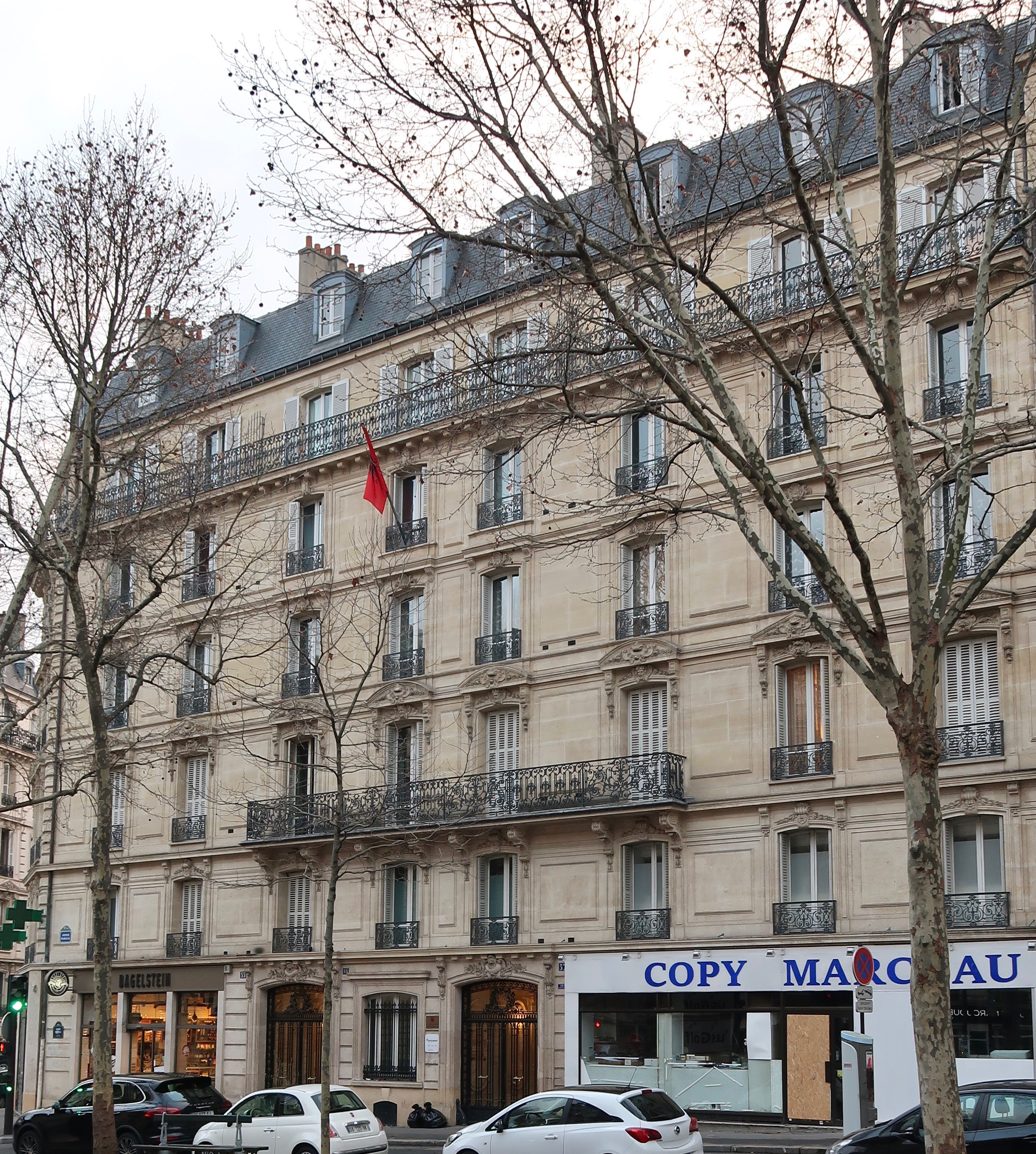
Embassy in Paris

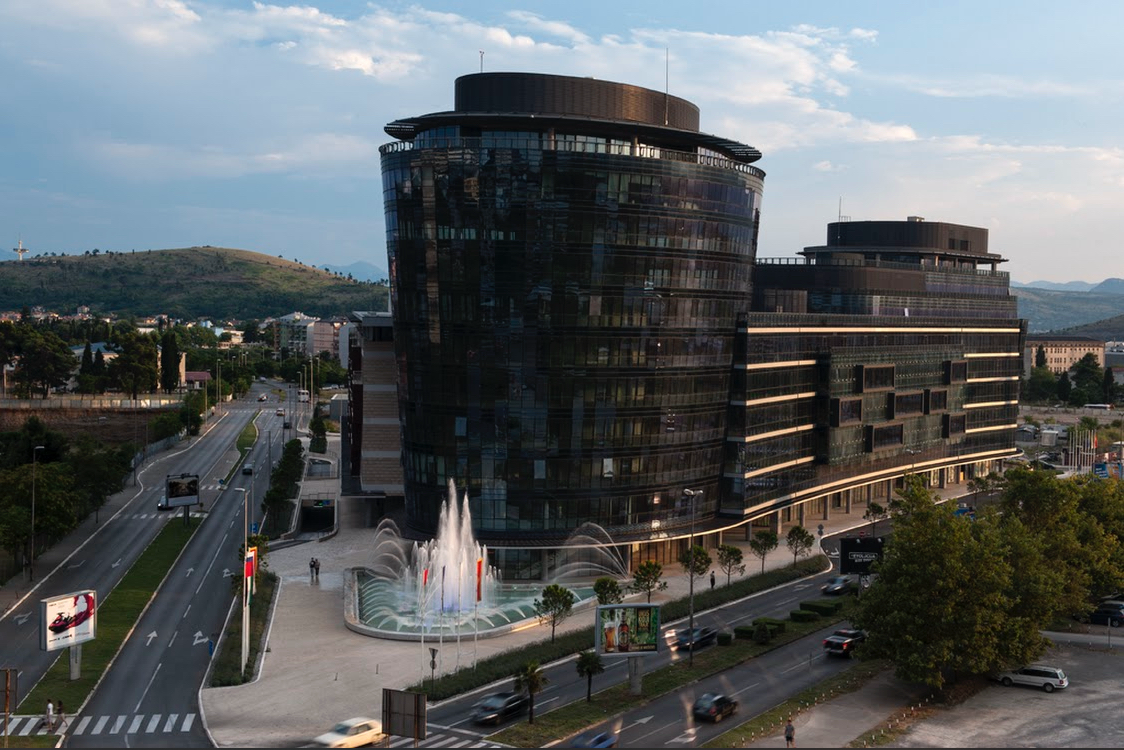
Building hosting the Embassy in Podgorica

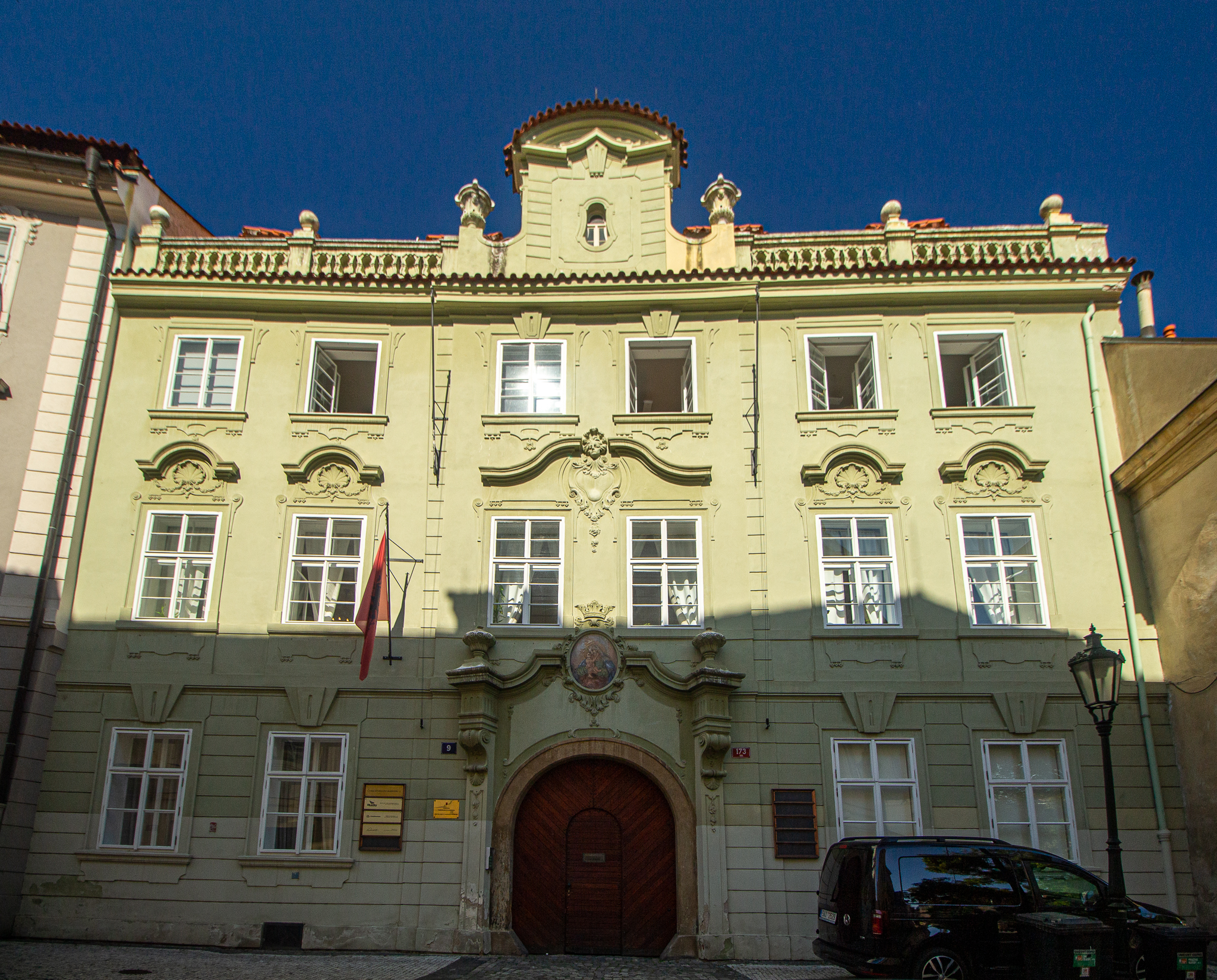
Embassy in Prague

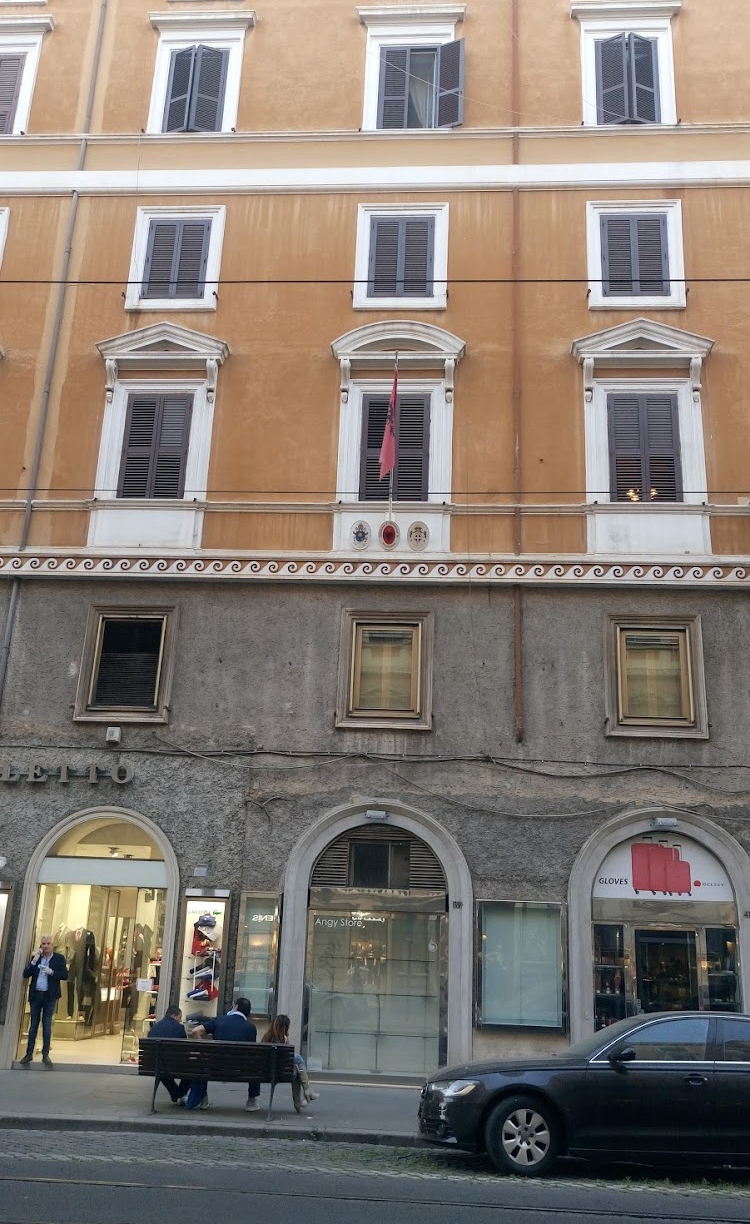
Building hosting the Embassy to the Holy See in Rome

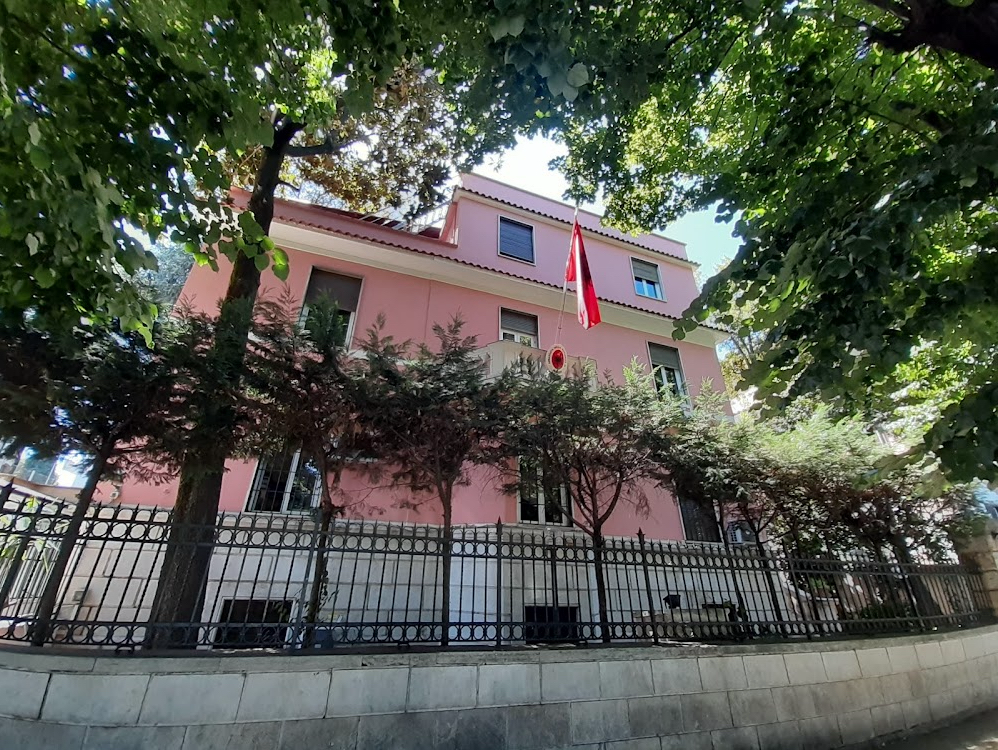
Embassy in Rome

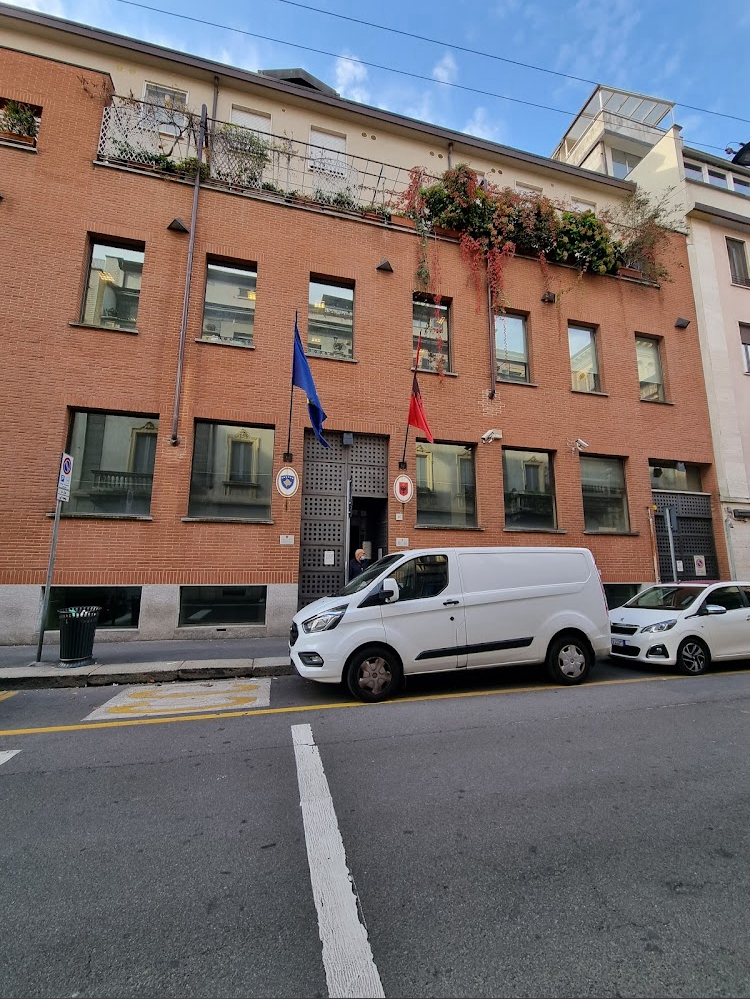
Building hosting the Consulate-General in Milan

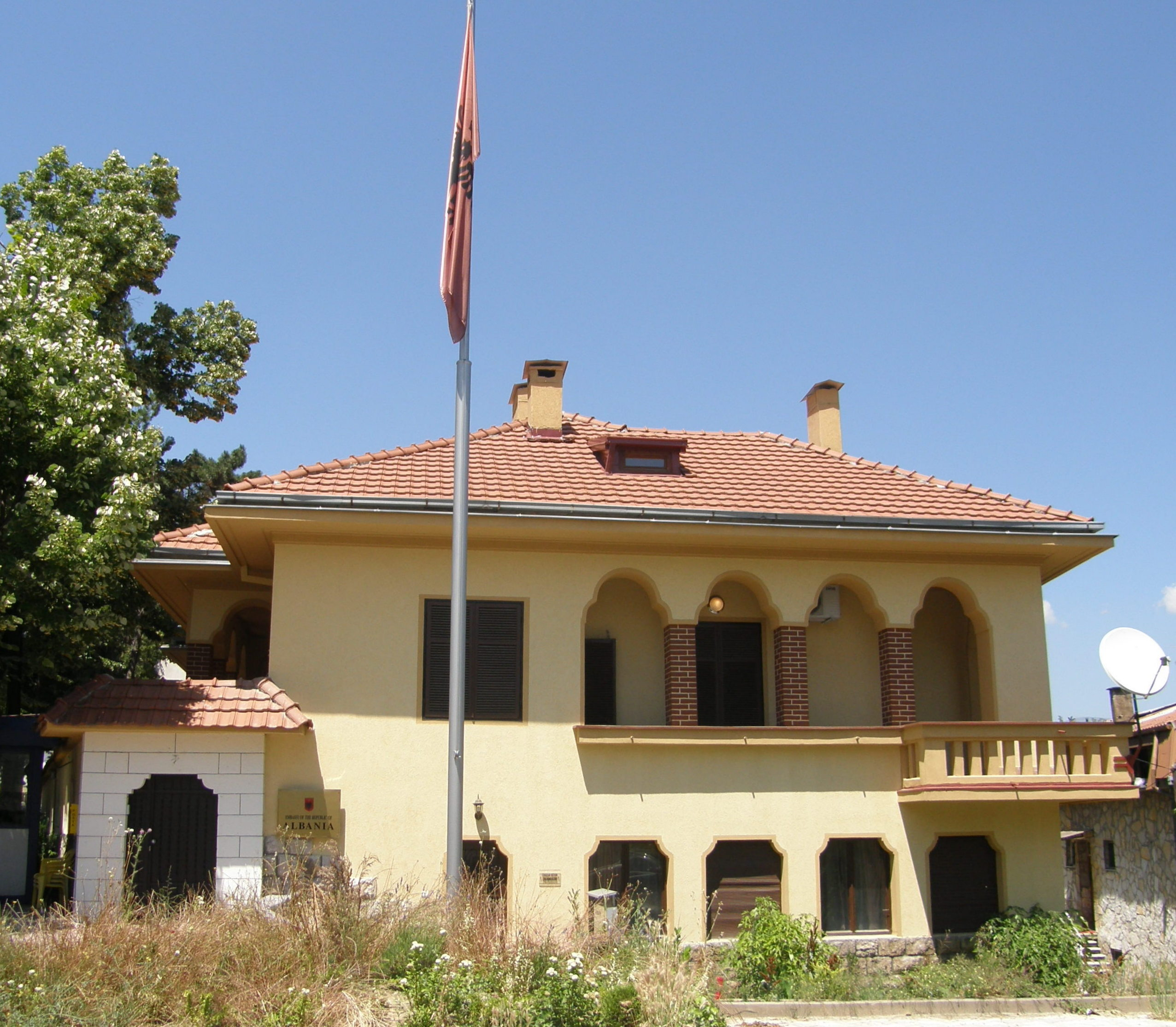
Embassy in Skopje

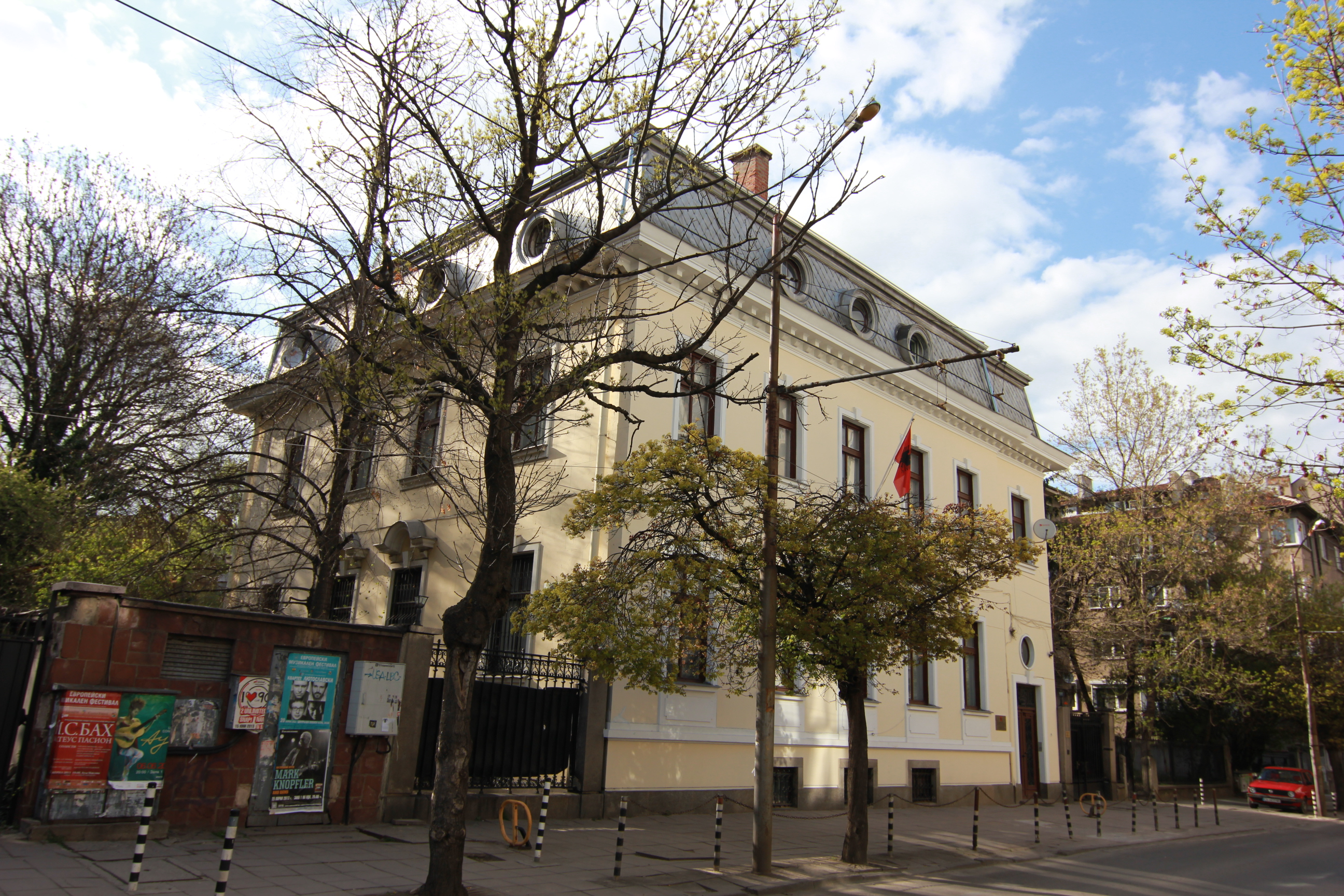
Embassy in Sofia

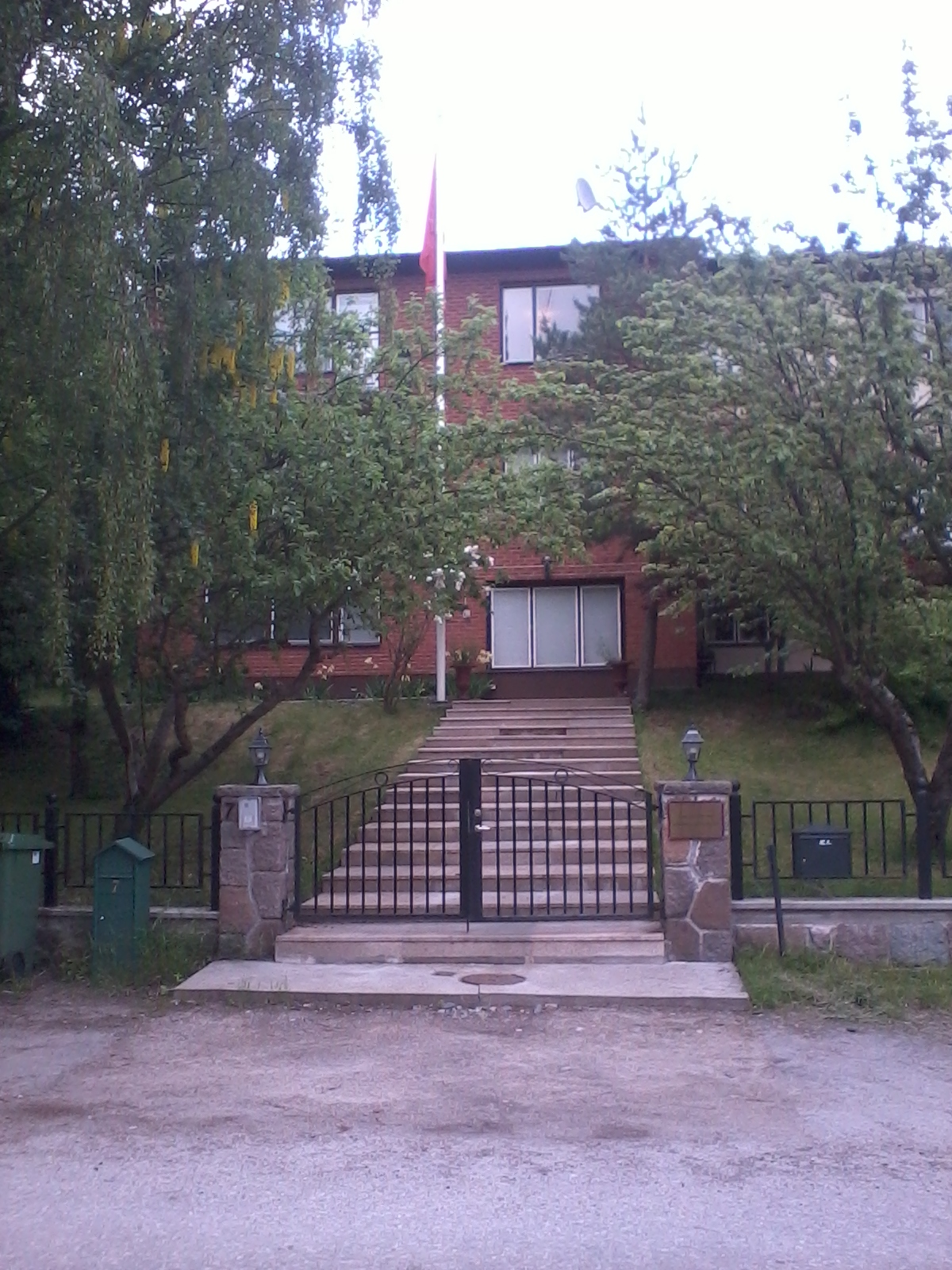
Embassy in Stockholm

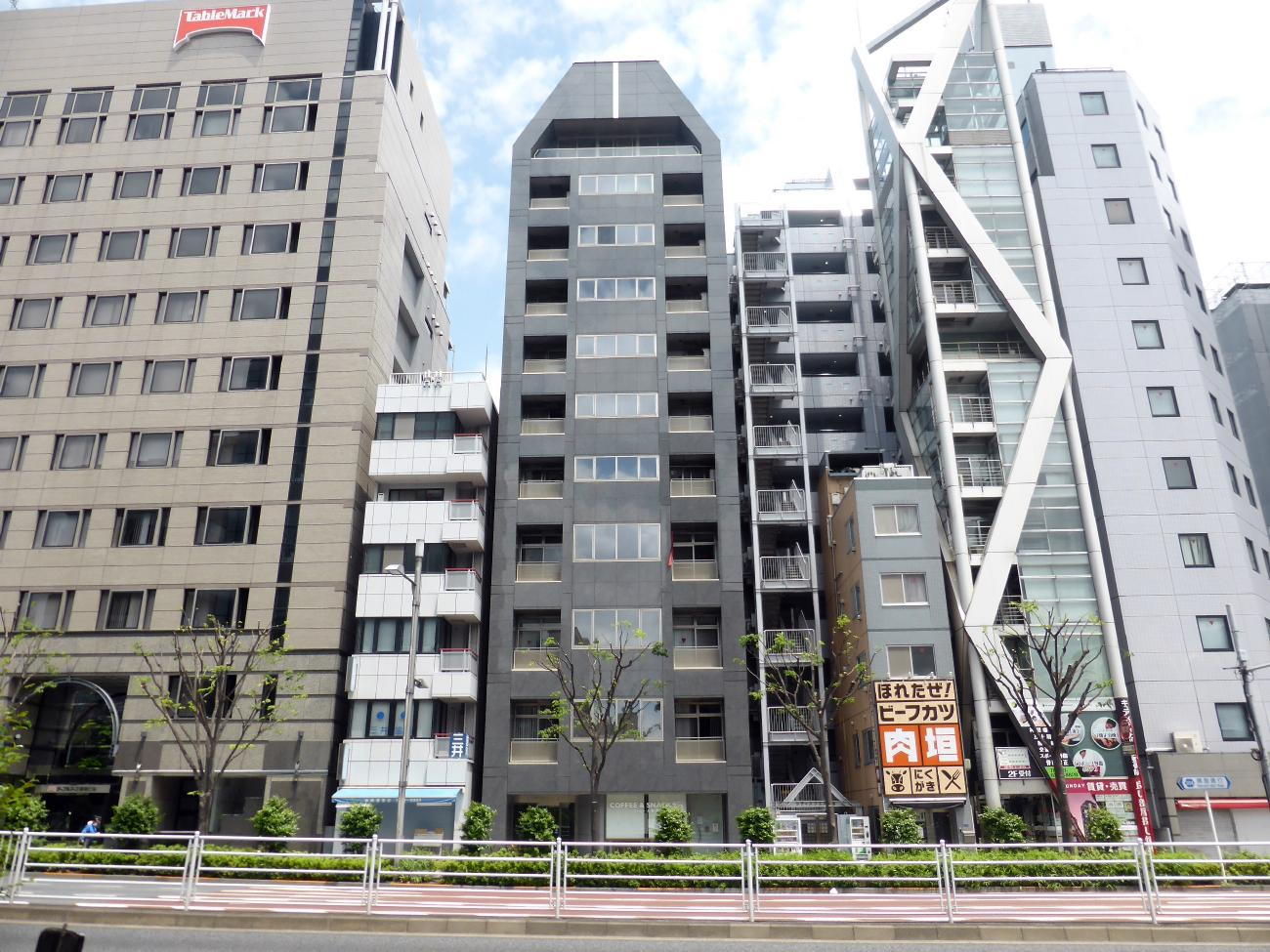
Building hosting the Embassy in Tokyo

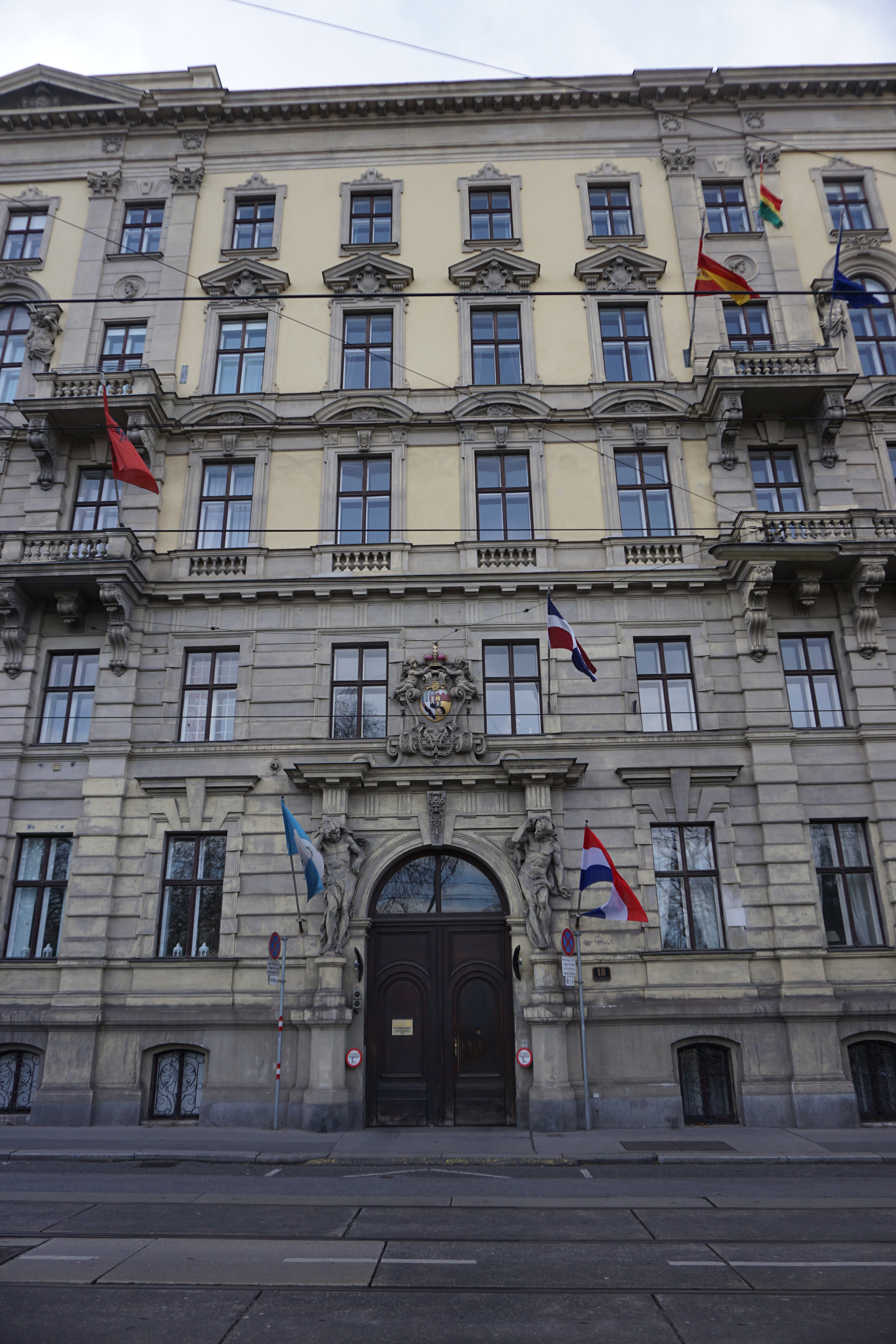
Building hosting the Embassy in Vienna

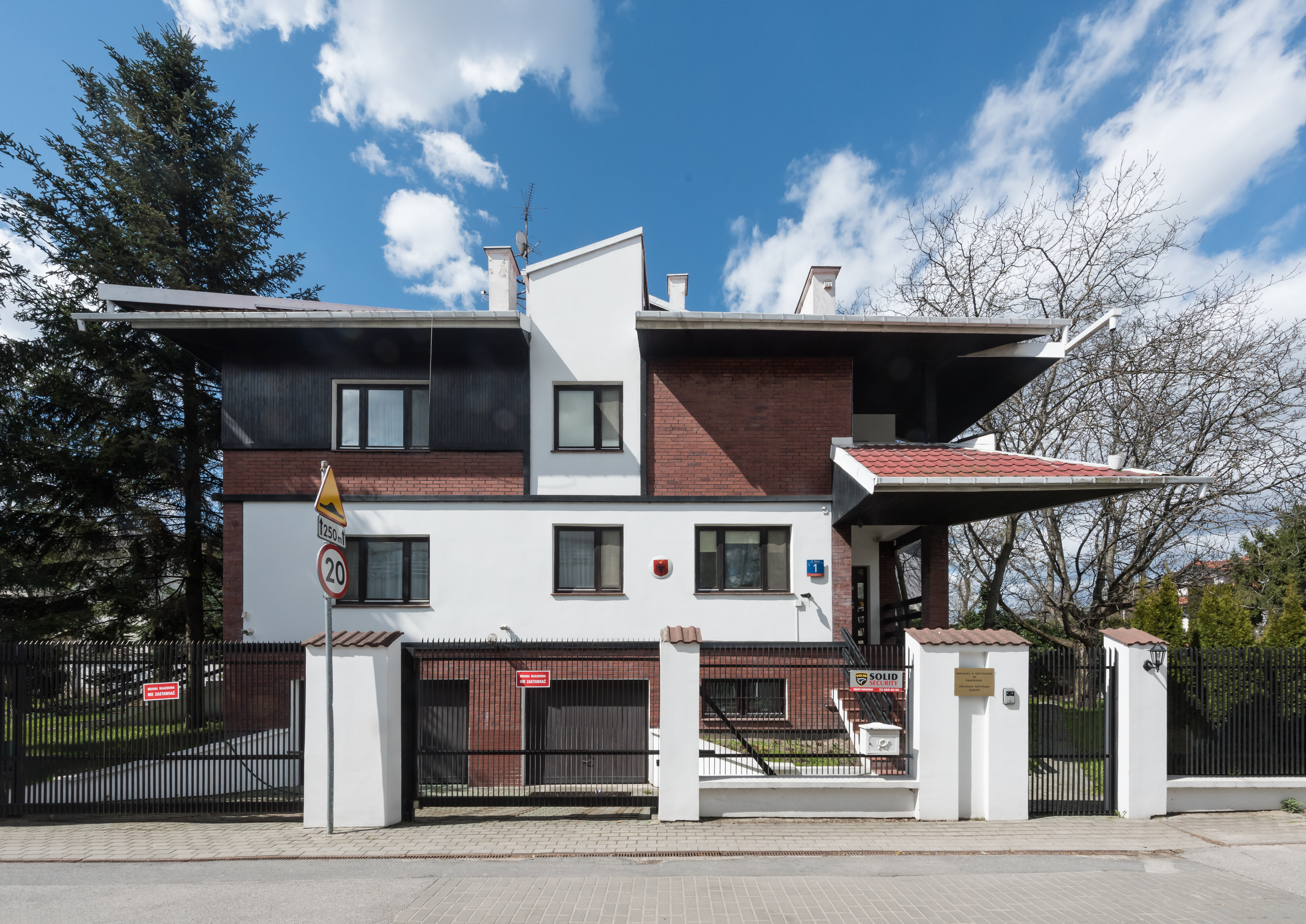
Embassy in Warsaw

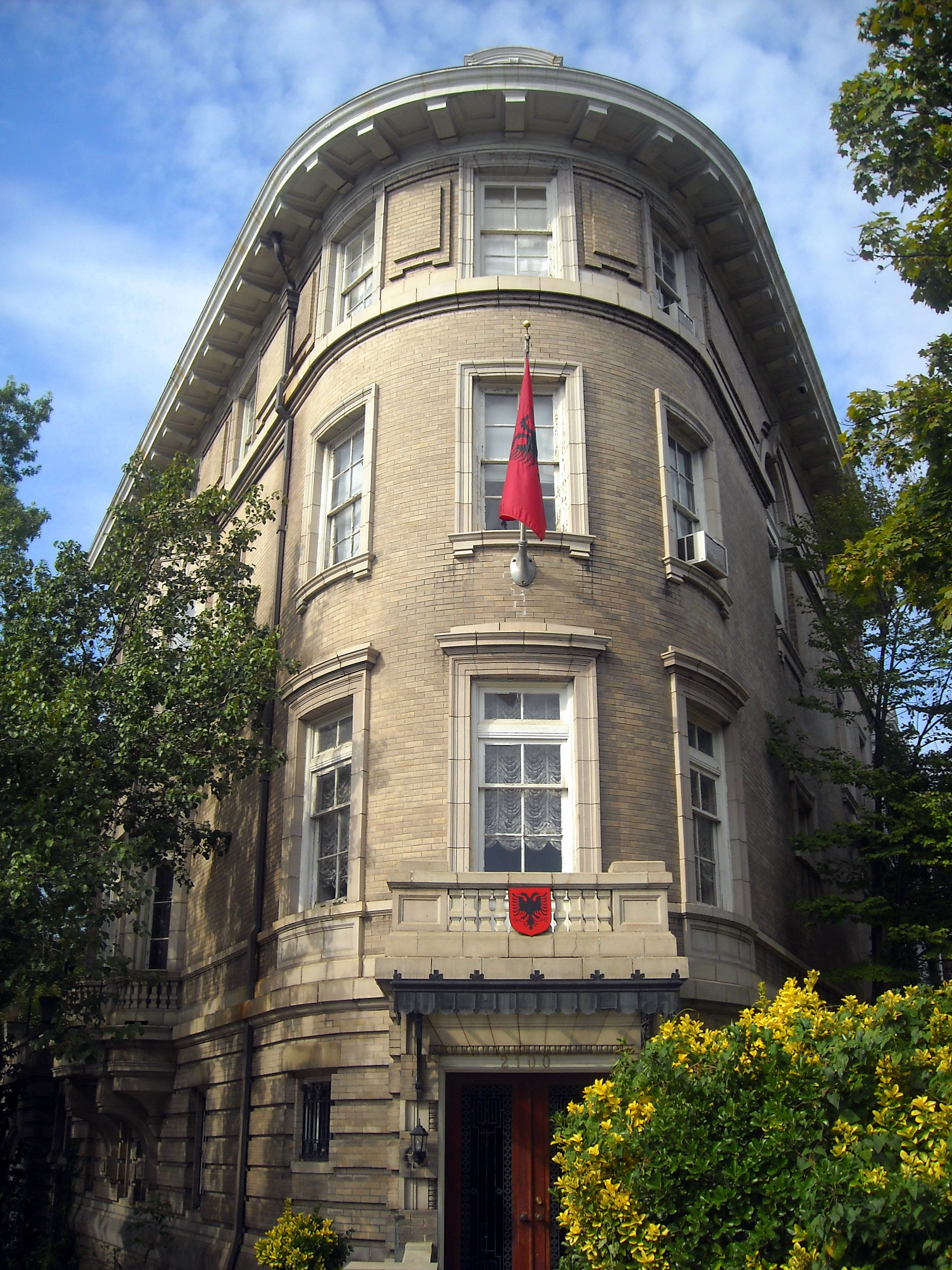
Embassy in Washington, D.C.

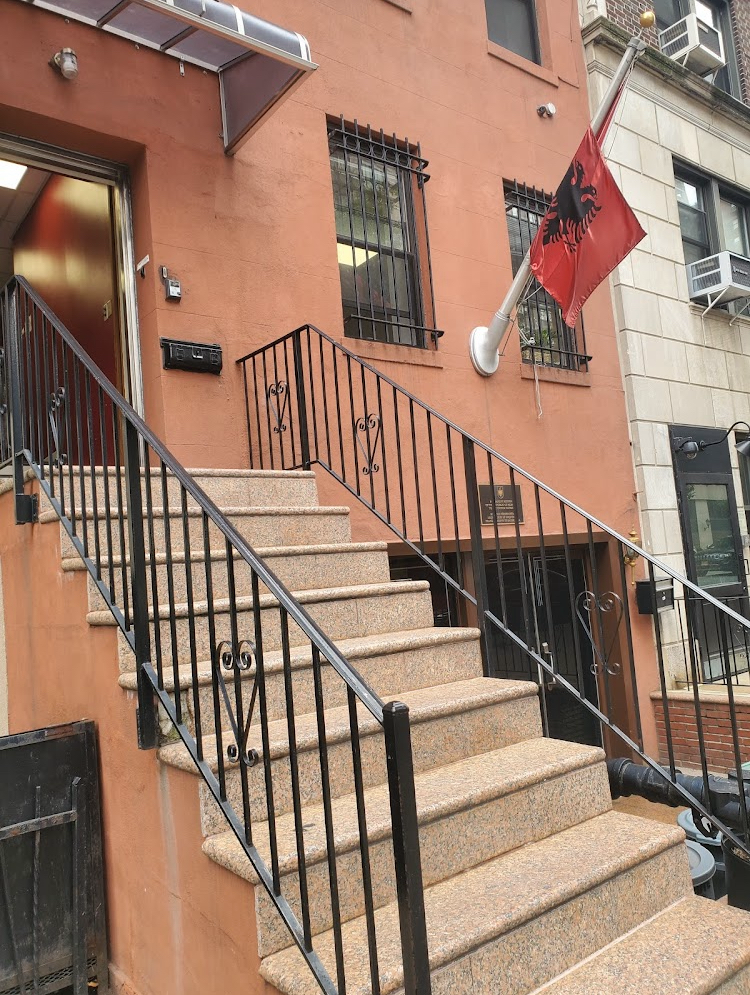
Consulate-General and Permanent Mission to the United Nations in New York City

== Closed missions ==
=== Africa ===
Host country	Host city	Mission	Year closed	Ref.
Algeria	Algiers	Embassy	1992	
Ghana	Accra	Embassy	1966	
Libya	Tripoli	Embassy	Unknown	

=== Americas ===
Host country	Host city	Mission	Year closed	Ref.
Argentina	Buenos Aires	Embassy	2014	
Cuba	Havana	Embassy	1992	
Mexico	Mexico City	Embassy	1991	

=== Asia ===
Host country	Host city	Mission	Year closed	Ref.
India	New Delhi	Embassy (Note: To be reopened.)	2014	
Malaysia	Kuala Lumpur	Embassy	2014	
North Korea	Pyongyang	Embassy	Unknown	
Vietnam	Hanoi	Embassy	1992	

=== Europe ===
Host country	Host city	Mission	Year closed	Ref.
East Germany	East Berlin	Embassy (Note: Now continues as an embassy in Berlin nowadays.)	1990	
Portugal	Lisbon	Embassy	2014	

== Missions to open ==
Host country	Host city	Mission	Ref.
United States	Detroit	Consulate	
India	New Delhi	Embassy	
Ireland	Dublin	Embassy	

== See also ==
- Foreign relations of Albania
- List of diplomatic missions in Albania
- Visa policy of Albania
- Honorary consulates of Albania
