= Thomas Beale =

Scottish naturalist and merchant (1775–1841)

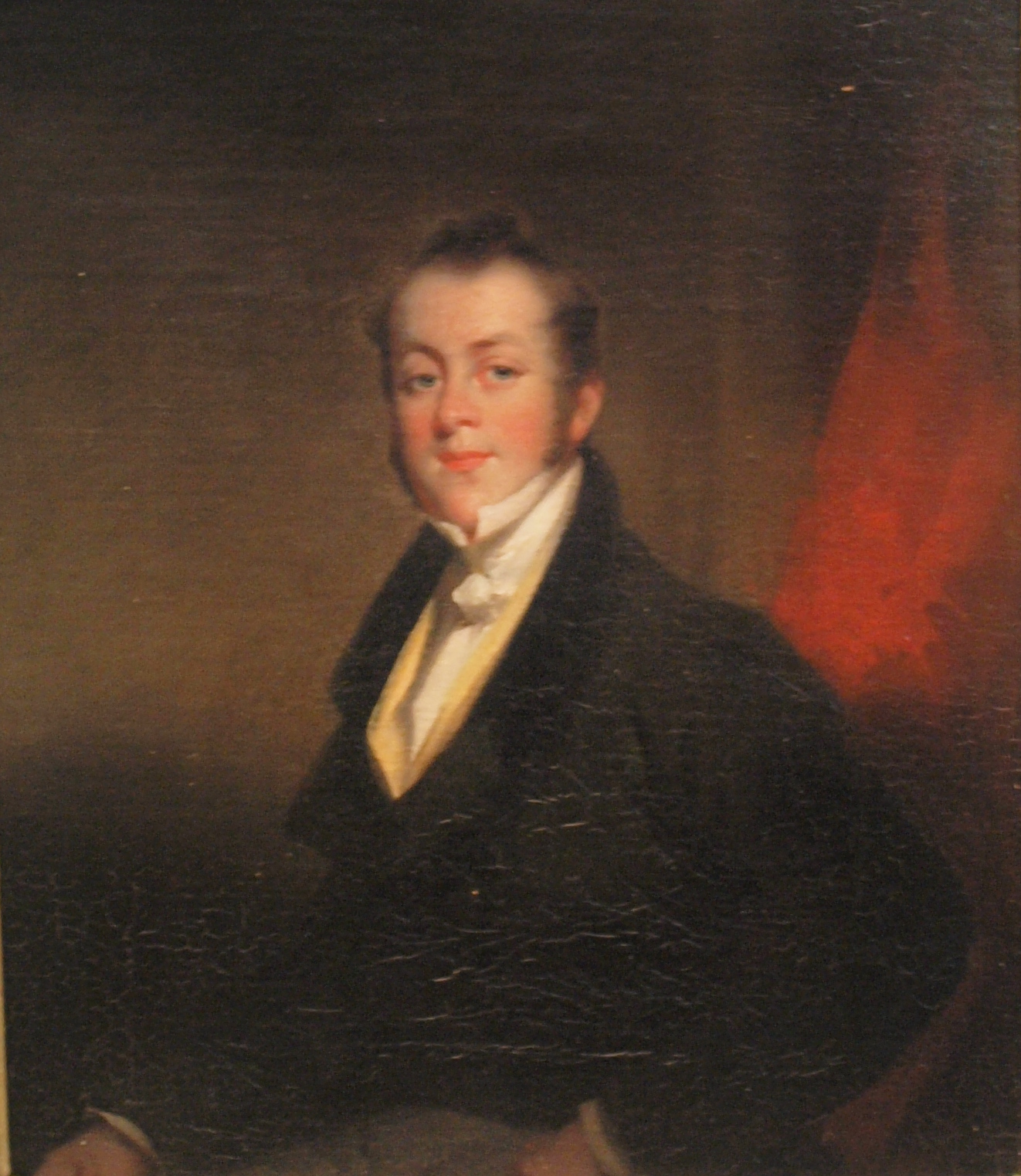
- Portrait of Thomas Beale by George Chinnery
- Born: 1775
- Died: January 1841 (aged 65–66); Macau (body found at Casilha Bay)
- Occupations: Naturalist, opium speculator, general merchant
- Known for: Prussian consul at Canton (1798–at least 1814); noted Macau garden and aviary; namesake of the turtle Sacalia bealei
- Partners: Hollingworth Magniac and others, in Magniac & Co.
- Relatives: Daniel Beale (brother); Thomas Chaye Beale (cousin)

Thomas Beale (c. 1775–1841) was a Scottish naturalist, opium speculator and general merchant operating in the Far East during the 19th century.

== Biography ==
Thomas was the younger brother of Daniel Beale and the cousin of Thomas Chaye Beale.

He is first mentioned as one of the five unofficial foreign residents in Canton in 1796 as secretary to his older brother who was the Prussian consul. Thomas later became consul in his own right and served from 1798 until at least 1814. Both brothers were partners in the trading firm of Magniac & Co., which dealt in goods including opium, cotton and tea. The Prussian consulship eventually devolved upon Jardine, Matheson & Co. through Hollingworth Magniac.

Known for his hospitality, Beale's mansion in Macao included a garden with 2,500 potted plants and an aviary that became a must-see for Western visitors to Macau. The 40 by 20 feet (12.2 by 6.1 m) aviary contained hundreds of rare birds from China, Europe, Southeast Asia, and South America. George Vachell, chaplain to the East India Company described a visit during which he saw about six hundred birds to his friend John Stevens Henslow, Professor of Botany at Cambridge University and mentor to Charles Darwin. When the missionary cum naturalist George Bennett stopped in Macau during his Pacific voyage, Beale's garden and aviary made such an impression that he devoted forty-five pages of his travelogue to describing their contents. The house was described by a contemporary as "one of the finest of the old Portuguese houses ... on a narrow street known as Beale's Lane". Of Beale's aviary, contemporary visitor William Wightman Wood wrote:

in particular I may mention the bird-of-paradise. A splendid living specimen is in the possession of Mr. Beale almost domesticated. It feeds from the hand of its amiable owner without fear, and appears capable of being rendered perfectly tame and familiar. This is perhaps the only specimen at present existing in confinement."

After offering opium futures as security for loans in a falling market and investing millions of dollars in illicit deals in Brazil, he ended up owing the East India Company some 800,000 dollars. In 1816, Thomas was declared insolvent in the "most sensational bankruptcy of the period".

Bankruptcy notwithstanding, Thomas' amiability made him Lady Elizabeth Napier's favourite among the Europeans in Macau in 1834 and he later subscribed 20 pounds sterling for a memorial to her husband the late William John, Lord Napier, first Chief Superintendent of Trade at Canton, so appointed following the abolition of the East India Company's monopoly on Far Eastern trade.

The body of Thomas was found washed ashore at Casilha Bay, near Macau in January 1841, after he allegedly committed suicide.

Thomas Beale is commemorated in the scientific name of a species of East Asian turtle, Sacalia bealei.
