= Thomas Chay Beale =

Thomas Chay Beale (13 December 1805 – 3 November 1857) was a Scottish merchant and diplomat who was active in the East Indies during the 19th century. He was a Chevalier of the Legion of Honor and of the Portuguese Order of Christ.

== Biography ==
Chay Beale was a nephew of opium trader and merchant Daniel Beale and his brother Thomas Beale. As early as 1826, he was a partner in the trading firm of Magniac & Co. in Canton, China. In the 1830s, he left Magniac & Co. and operated on his own until 1845 when he established the Shanghai based agency house of Dent, Beale & Co. with Lancelot Dent. By 1851, Beale was Portuguese Consul and Dutch Vice Counsel in the city.

He is buried in the Shantung Road Cemetery in Shanghai and there is a memorial to him in the church of St. Mary the Virgin in Brettenham, Suffolk.

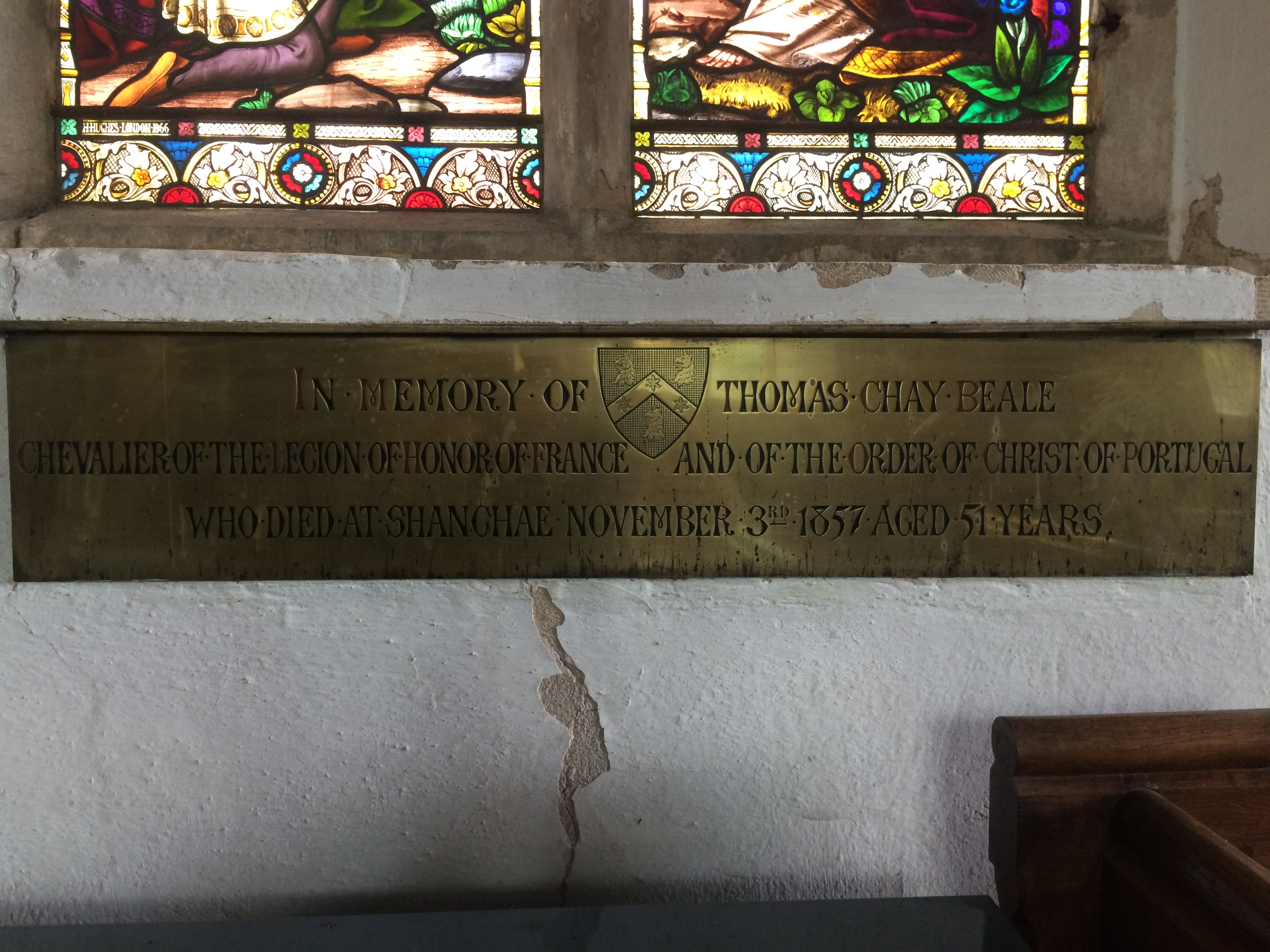
Memorial to Thomas Chay Beale in St Mary the Virgin, Brettenham
