= Carro (online car marketplace) =

Online car marketplace

- Type: Private
- Founded: 2015; 11 years ago in Singapore
- Founders: Aaron Tan, Aditya Lesmana, Kelvin Chng
- Headquarters: Singapore
- Area served: Southeast Asia
- Website: carro.co

Carro is an online marketplace for buying and selling new and used cars headquartered in Singapore and operates in Malaysia, Indonesia, Thailand, Japan, Taiwan and Hong Kong.

== History ==
Carro was co-founded in 2015 by Aaron Tan and his Carnegie Mellon University classmates Aditya Lesmana and Kelvin Chng.

In 2016, Carro received $5.3 million in a series A funding round led by Venturra Capital and other investors including Golden Gate Ventures, Alpha JWC and GMO Ventures. In May 2018, Carro raised $60 million in a series B round led by Softbank Ventures Korea, Insignia Ventures Partners, Singtel Innov8 and B Capital. In August 2019, Carro raised $30 million in a round of series B funding and used the funds to acquire the Indonesian e-commerce site Jualo.com. In September, Carro announced the inception of its operations in Malaysia through a $30 million investment into the car-bidding online platform Carro Malaysia (formerly myTukar).

In June 2021, Carro received $360 million in a C funding round which raised its valuation to $1 billion led by SoftBank. In November, Singapore state investor Temasek Holdings and Malaysian fund manager and Permodalan Nasional Berhad (PNB) led a Series C round for Carro which raised more than $100 million, other investors included Sime Darby, Shinhan Financial Group and Mirae Asset.

In June 2022, Carro acquired a 50% stake in the rental unit of the Indonesian automotive group, PT Mitra Pinasthika Mustika (MPM Rent) for nearly $54 million. In March 2023, Carro added EMPG, the parent company of Kaidee, to its cap table. In June, Carro entered into a partnership with Jardine Cycle & Carriage valued at more than $60 million. In March 2024, Carro started its operations in Hong Kong by the acquisition of the used car market Beyond Cars.
