= Matari Advertising =

Indonesian advertising agency

- Industry: Advertising, Marketing
- Founded: 1971
- Headquarters: Jakarta, Indonesia
- Area served: Indonesia
- Website: www.matari-ad.com

Matari Advertising is an Indonesian advertising agency which was established in 1971 with the reason that "Only Indonesian would understand and could communicate with other Indonesian", referring to the advertising industry in Indonesia which was, at that time dominated by foreign advertising companies.

== History ==
Matari Advertising was established in 1971. It was founded by late Ken Sudarto (So Kian-Djiang), who is considered as one of the iconic figure in Indonesian advertising industry. Matari Advertising is also one of the founder of Persatuan Perusahaan Periklanan Indonesia (Indonesian Advertising Company association) or also known as PPPI.

Matari advertising started as Matari Inc. which was a subsidiary company of Mark Lean Advertising Agency and used most of their resources from the company, before finally separate themselves from the company and become an independent company which fully uses local resources, because they believe that the Indonesian understand their country better than anyone else.

== Suspension ==
In 1973, Matari advertising had a problem with Indonesian Advertising Company Association and Grant International, which resulted in Matari advertising being suspended for a short period of time. During the period of 1975 - 1976, Matari advertising faced difficulty because they were trying to speculate outside advertising industry. However, they were saved by the investments from their old clients, one of them is Astra International. Matari also received a big investment from Paul Karmadi, a well known Indonesian businessman and also an old friend of Ken Sudarto, by buying 30% of the share.

== Recognition ==
Matari advertising is the first Indonesian advertising agency that made their way to the final of Clio Award in the 80's.

As for billing, Matari advertising is always in the top 5 position in Indonesian advertising industry, competing with multinational advertising agencies.

In August 2013, Matari advertising held a charity titled "Matari 4 Shared" with the purposes to give helps to Indonesian children who have cancer.
