= Anthony Nightingale =

Hong Kong businessman

Anthony John Liddell Nightingale CMG, SBS (traditional Chinese: 黎定基) (born 1947) is a Hong Kong businessman. He spent his career with Jardine Matheson Holdings, a diversified business group focused on Asia, and served as managing director from 2006 to 2012. He retired as Managing Director of Jardine Matheson in March 2012, but he still serves as a non-executive director of the company and other listed group companies.

During Nightingale's career, he held numerous positions related to the economic development of Hong Kong and Greater China. In various public and private sector roles, Nightingale contributed to the discussion of economic and trade issues impacting the Asia-Pacific region across sectors such as finance, transportation, real estate and retail sales.

Nightingale's positions include Hong Kong representative to the Asia-Pacific Economic Cooperation (APEC) Business Advisory Council, Non-Official Member of the Commission on Strategic Development, Member of the Committee on Strategic Enhancement of Hong Kong as an International Financial Centre, Vice-President of the Real Estate Developers Association of Hong Kong, and Chairman of the Missions to Seamen in Hong Kong. He is also a past chairman of the Hong Kong General Chamber of Commerce, past chairman of the Business Facilitation Advisory Committee and a past council member of the Hong Kong Trade Development Council. In 2007, Nightingale was the recipient of the Silver Bauhinia Star, which is the second rank in the Order of the Bauhinia Star in Hong Kong, awarded for leadership in public affairs or for voluntary work over a long period.

Nightingale joined the Jardine Matheson Group in 1969. His early career focused on financial services, marketing and distribution, and property based in Hong Kong, Japan and later Saudi Arabia. He became managing director of Jardine Pacific, the holding company for Jardine Matheson's non-listed businesses, on its formation in 1988. Nightingale joined the board of directors of Jardine Matheson in 1994, and thereafter had responsibility for managing the Group's interests in Jardine Pacific, Jardine Motors, Jardine Cycle & Carriage, and Astra International. He was appointed managing director of the Group in 2006.

From 2006 to 2012, Nightingale also served as Chairman of MINDSET, a mental health charity operated by Jardine Matheson Group.

He was educated at Uppingham School, and graduated from Peterhouse, Cambridge, with a bachelor's degree (honours) in Classics.

Nightingale was appointed Companion of the Order of St Michael and St George (CMG) in the 2012 Birthday Honours for services to British business interests in Asia.
