= J37 =

J37 may refer to:

- Elongated square gyrobicupola, a Johnson solid (J_{37})
- Honda J37, an automobile engine
- Jardine Strategic Holdings, a Singaporean holding company
- Laryngitis
- LNER Class J37, a British steam locomotive class
- Lockheed J37, an American turbojet engine
- Studer J37, a Swiss audio recorder
