= Jardines (company) =

British conglomerate that is incorporated in Bermuda and headquartered in Hong Kong

Jardine Matheson Holdings Limited

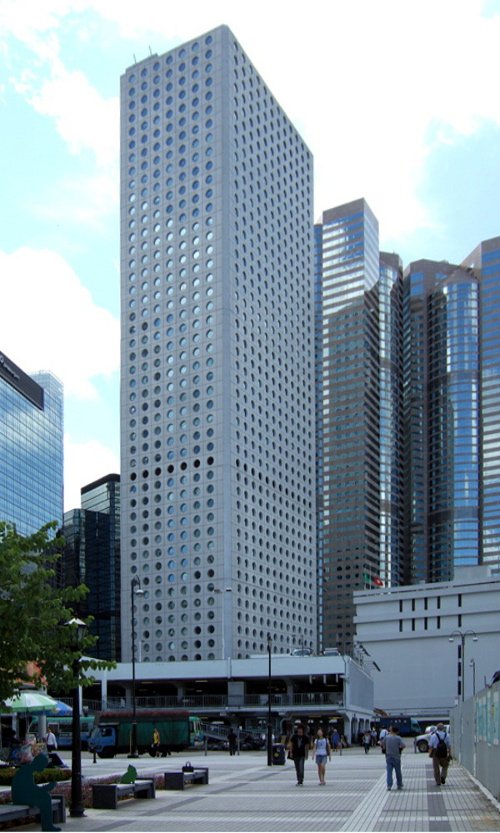
- Jardine House in Hong Kong
- Type: Public
- Traded as: LSE: JARB; LSE: JARJ; LSE: JAR; SGX: J36; BSX: JMHBD.BH
- Industry: Conglomerate
- Founded: 1 July 1832; 194 years ago
- Founders: William Jardine; James Matheson
- Headquarters: 48/F Jardine House, Hong Kong
- Area served: Worldwide
- Key people: Ben Keswick (executive chairman); Lincoln Pan (Chief executive officer)
- Products: Retail; Real estate; Shipping and aviation; Construction; Automotive; Hotels
- Revenue: ▲US$109.3 billion (2021)
- Operating income: ▲US$4.1 billion (2021)
- Net income: ▲US$1.5 billion (2021)
- Total assets: ▼US$91.4 billion (2021)
- Total equity: ▼US$58.3 billion (2021)
- Owner: Keswick family
- Number of employees: 400,000+ (2021)
- Subsidiaries: Astra International; Jardine Pacific; Jardine Motors; Jardine Strategic Holdings; Jardine Cycle & Carriage; Mandarin Oriental Hotel Group; Hongkong Land; DFI Retail Group
- Website: www.jardines.com

Jardine Matheson
- Traditional Chinese: 怡和洋行
- Simplified Chinese: 怡和洋行
Transcriptions
Standard Mandarin
- Hanyu Pinyin: yí hé yángháng
Yue: Cantonese
- Jyutping: ji4 wo4 joeng4 hong4

Jardine Matheson Holdings Limited (also known as Jardines) is a Hong Kong–based, Bermuda–domiciled and British–listed multinational conglomerate. It has a primary listing on the London Stock Exchange (LSE) and secondary listings on the Singapore Exchange (SGX) and Bermuda Stock Exchange (BSE).

The majority of its business interests are in Asia, and its subsidiaries include Jardine Pacific, Jardine Motors, Hongkong Land, Jardine Strategic Holdings, DFI Retail Group, Mandarin Oriental Hotel Group, Jardine Cycle & Carriage and Astra International. It set up the Jardine Scholarship in 1982 and Mindset, a mental health-focused charity, in 2002.

Jardines was one of the original Hong Kong trading houses or hongs that date back to Imperial China. 58 percent of the company's profits were earned in China in 2019. The company is controlled by the Keswick family, who are descendants of co-founder William Jardine's older sister, Jean Johnstone.

Jardine Matheson is a Fortune Global 500 company. In 2013, both Jardine Matheson and Jardine Strategic were among the top 200 publicly traded companies in the world, as valued by market capitalisation. It is also a component of Forbes Global 2000.

== History ==
=== 19th century to WWII: The early days ===
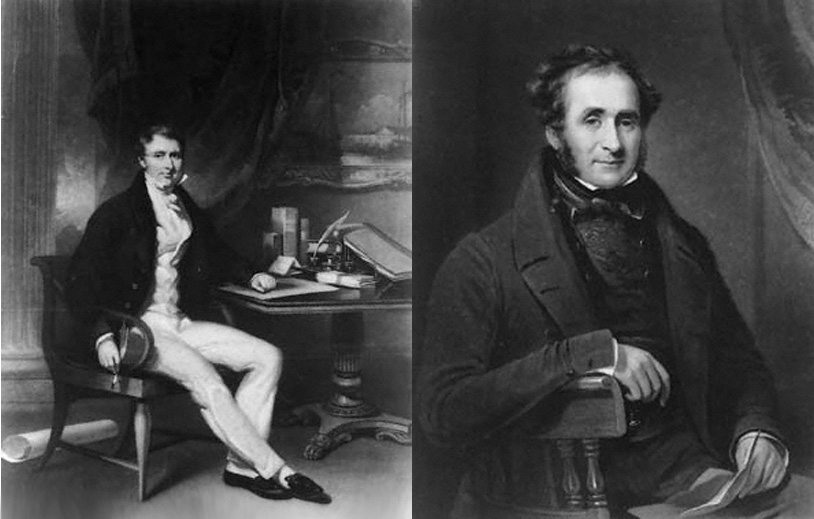
William Jardine and James Matheson, the firm's founders

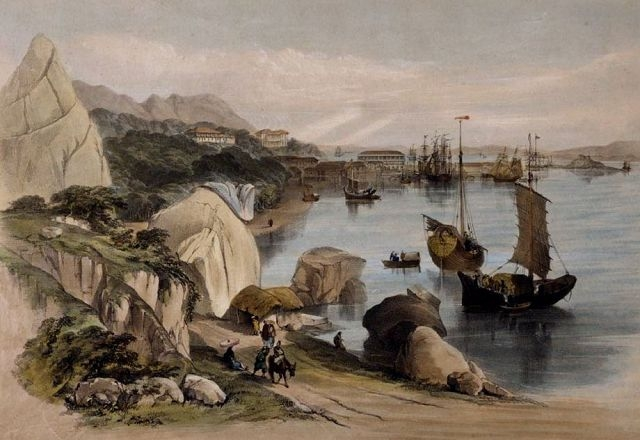
1846 view of Jardine's original building from Causeway Bay, Hong Kong.

The firm of Jardine, Matheson & Company emerged in 1832 from an evolving process of partnership changes in the trading business Cox & Reid, a partnership established in 1782 between John Cox and John Reid, the latter having been agent of the Austrian trading company, Trieste Company.

University of Edinburgh Medical School graduate William Jardine (1784–1843) joined the firm, by then having morphed through Cox & Beale, Beale & Company and Beale & Magniac into Magniac & Company, and the original partners long gone, in 1825 at the invitation of principal Hollingworth Magniac. University of Edinburgh graduate James Matheson joined three years later as Magniac prepared to retire. With the cession of Hong Kong under the 1842 Treaty of Nanking, the firm, by then named Jardine, Matheson & Company, set up its headquarters on the island and grew rapidly, smuggling illegal opium from British-controlled India into China. Jardine Matheson has been called the "most successful opium smuggling company in the world".

Both Jardine and Matheson became members of Parliament in Britain, and Matheson also bought the entire Scottish island of Lewis, clearing over 500 families off the land and shipping them to Canada in order to build Lews Castle. Continuing its longstanding trade in smuggled opium, tea, and cotton, the firm diversified into other areas including insurance, shipping, and railways.

By the mid-19th century, the company had become the largest of the hongs or foreign trading conglomerates with offices in all the important Chinese cities as well as Yokohama, Japan. One of its branch agencies, Glover and Co., established in Nagasaki, was known in Japan as an arms dealer who contracted with then-rebel forces from Chōshū Domain who led the Meiji Restoration in 1868.

Jardine Matheson invested in the first commercial railroad in China, the Wusong-Shanghai railroad. It was built in July 1876, bought by the Qing dynasty the next year, and demolished the next year.

In the early decades of the 20th century, Jardines built cotton mills, a press packing plant, and a brewery in Shanghai while expanding into Africa, America, and Australia. When war came to China in 1937, the firm suffered heavily both in Hong Kong and in mainland China.

After the 1949 foundation of the People's Republic of China, trading conditions for foreign companies under the new Communist regime became increasingly difficult.

=== Post-WWII restructuring and expansion ===
The firm listed in Hong Kong in 1961. The landmark Mandarin Hotel opened in Hong Kong in 1963 as the city's first five star hotel.

In 1970, Jardine Fleming, the first merchant bank in Asia, opened for business while a real estate company and sugar plantations in Hawaii and the Philippines were acquired. A Hong Kong building boom in the mid 1970s saw Jardine's buy Gammon Construction, the largest construction and civil engineering group on the island. A presence was re-established on the mainland in 1979 following China's reform and opening up and a year later the firm established the Beijing Air Catering, the first foreign joint venture in the country since 1954. During the 1970s Jardines also expanded their insurance interests with acquisitions in the United Kingdom and the United States laying the groundwork for the foundation of Jardine Insurance Brokers.

By 1980, the firm had operations in southern Africa, Australia, China, Great Britain, Hong Kong, Indonesia, Japan, Malaysia, Philippines, Saudi Arabia, Singapore, South Korea, Taiwan, Thailand, as well as the United States, and employed 37,000 people. After re-domiciling to Bermuda in 1984 ahead of the 1997 handover of Hong Kong, in 1990 Jardine Matheson Holdings and four other listed group companies arranged primary share listings on the London Stock Exchange in addition to their Hong Kong listings. Other significant developments during this decade included the merging of Jardine Insurance Brokers with Lloyd Thompson to form Jardine Lloyd Thompson, the acquisition of a 16% interest in Singapore blue-chip Cycle & Carriage and Dairy Farm’s purchase of a significant stake in Indonesia's leading supermarket group Hero. Hotel brand Mandarin Oriental also embarked on a strategy to double its available rooms and improve returns.

The first decade of the new millennium saw Jardine Cycle & Carriage acquire an initial 31% stake in Astra International, which has since been increased to just over 50%. Hongkong Land became a Group subsidiary for the first time following a multi-year programme of steady open market purchases while Jardine Pacific raised its interest in Hong Kong Air Cargo Terminals Limited from 25% to 42%.

In 2018, Jardines sold its 41% interest in Jardine Lloyd Thompson to Marsh and McLennan Companies.

With the coming of a new generation of Keswick family leadership, diversification of assets has slowed down and the firm has focused more on consolidation of existing properties. Contrary to public perception of the firm avoiding investing into mainland China, preferring instead to seek profits in Southeast Asia, its subsidiary Hongkong Land spent 4.4 billion dollars buying a plot of land in Shanghai which, according to Jonathan Galligan of CLSA, signifies its commitment to doing business in mainland China. Moreover, according to informal calculations by Bloomberg, in 2019 the share of company profits from mainland business ventures is the third largest at 255.4 million USD. All in all, as of 2021 the company's annual report states that 55% of its profits come from China, as opposed to 42% and 3% earned in Southeast Asia and the rest of the world respectively.

Following a restructuring of the complex shareholding system designed to prevent a hostile takeover in 2021, Jardine Matheson consolidated Jardine Strategic as a wholly owned subsidiary.

== 21st-century operations ==
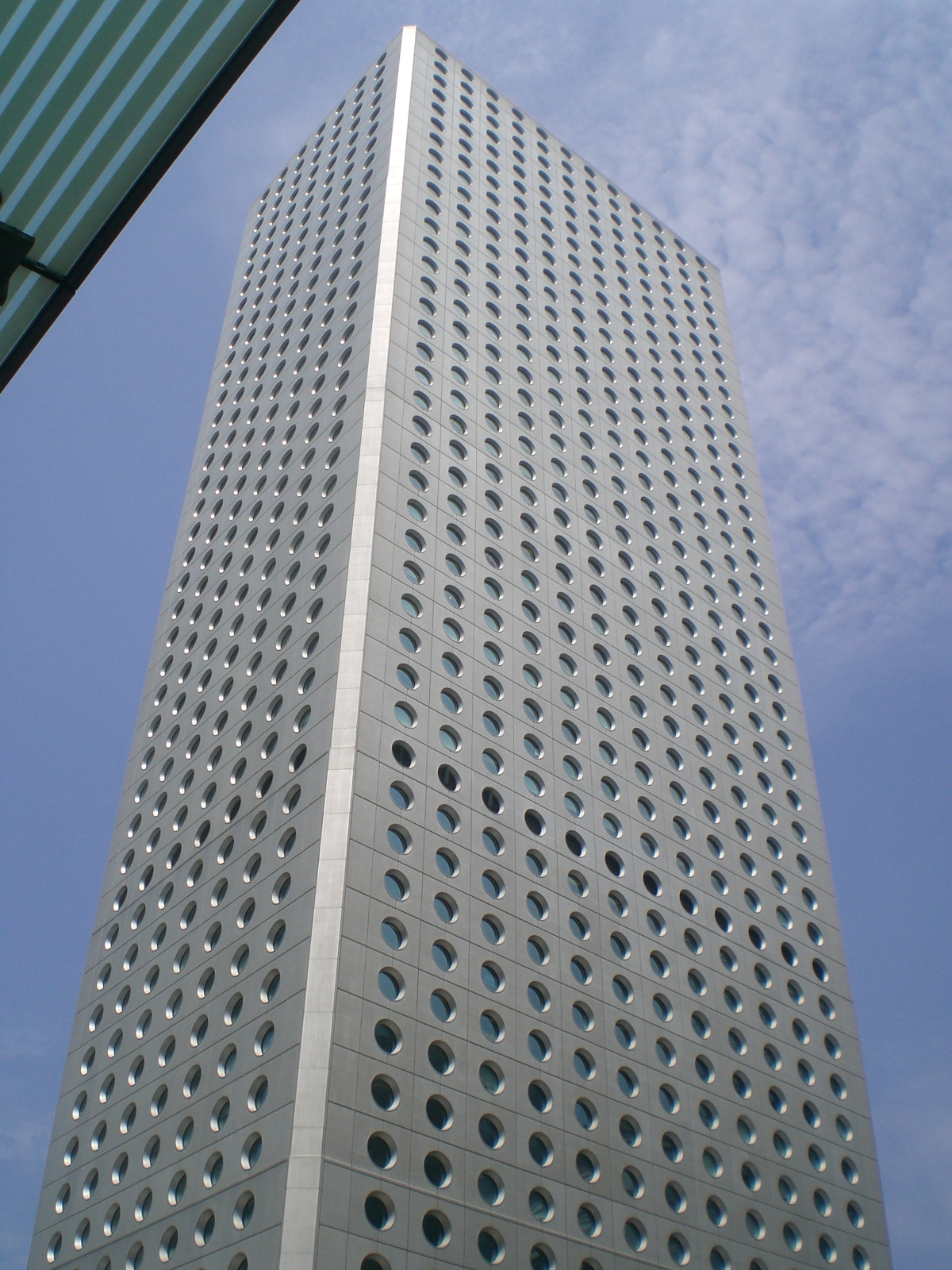
Jardine's headquarters (Jardine House)

Jardines today comprises a group of companies with extensive operations across Asia and, through some of its businesses, the world. The firm's business interests include Jardine Pacific, Jardine Motors, Hongkong Land, Dairy Farm, Mandarin Oriental, Jardine Cycle & Carriage, through which its interest in Astra is held. The Group also has strategic interests in other entities.

=== Jardine Pacific ===
Jardine Pacific is a holding company which represents a significant number of the Group's non-listed interests in Asia, principally in engineering and construction, transport services, restaurants and IT services. These include a number of Jardines’ long-standing businesses such as Jardine Engineering Corporation (JEC), Jardine Aviation Services, Hong Kong Air Cargo Terminals, Jardine Schindler (joint-venture with the Schindler Group which evolved from JEC's earlier appointment as Schindler's sole Hong Kong representative), Gammon Construction as well as more contemporary interests that reflect the demands of Asian consumers; among them Pizza Hut restaurants in Hong Kong, Taiwan, Vietnam and Myanmar, KFC franchises in Hong Kong (not part of Yum China or Yum Brands), Macau and Taiwan. Pizza Hut and KFC operations are under Jardine Restaurant Group.

=== Jardine Motors ===
Jardine Motors sells and services motor vehicles in Hong Kong, Macau, mainland China, and the United Kingdom. Subsidiary Zung Fu, which has held the Mercedes-Benz luxury vehicle franchise in Hong Kong for over 50 years, ranks among its top international performers for the brand. The group also represents Smart and Hyundai passenger cars in Hong Kong. Zung Fu is expanding into the growing market of Southern China where it is developing a network of Mercedes-Benz dealerships.

Jardine Motors forms part of one of the largest motor dealer groups in the UK, specializing in franchises including Aston Martin, Audi and Volkswagen, Jaguar and Land Rover, Mercedes-Benz and Porsche.

=== Hongkong Land ===
Hongkong Land is an Asian property investment, management and development group. Established in Hong Kong in 1889 by Sir Paul Chater and William Keswick, the group today has property interests across the region. In Hong Kong, the group owns and manages approximately 9,140,000 square feet (850,000 m^{2}) of prime commercial space in Central. In Singapore, it is helping to create the city-state's Central Business District with an expanding joint venture portfolio of new developments. In addition to commercial properties, Hongkong Land also develops residential properties in key cities around the region including Hong Kong, mainland China, Macau and Singapore where its subsidiary MCL Land is a significant property developer. Jardine Strategic has a 53% shareholding in Hongkong Land.

=== DFI Retail Group ===
DFI Retail Group traces its origins in Hong Kong back to the 19th century when it was involved in the production of dairy products and ice. Today the company is a leading pan-Asian retailer. The Dairy Farm group's retail operations range from grocery retail and health and beauty stores to convenience and home furnishings, operating under a number of well-known local brands. It has a significant presence in Hong Kong, Macau, Malaysia, Singapore, Taiwan, and Indonesia, and a growing presence in China, India and Vietnam.

Dairy Farm operates supermarkets under the banners of Wellcome, Jasons, Shop N Save, Cold Storage, Hero, Yonghui, and MarketPlace; hypermarkets under the Giant brand; health and beauty stores under Mannings and Guardian; IKEA furniture stores in Hong Kong, Macau, Indonesia, and Taiwan; as well as 7-Eleven convenience stores. The group also has a 50% interest in Maxim's, Hong Kong's leading restaurant chain. Jardine Strategic has a 78% shareholding in Dairy Farm. As of 8 March 2012, Dairy Farm owned 70% of the shares of Lucky Group, the largest grocery mall operator in Cambodia.

=== Mandarin Oriental ===
Mandarin Oriental Hotel Group is an international hotel investment and management company operating deluxe and first class hotels and residences in city and resort destinations around the world. The group's flagship hotel, Mandarin Oriental, Hong Kong, has been recognised as one of the world's leading hotels since shortly after its opening in 1963 along with the equally world-renowned Mandarin Oriental, Bangkok, previously known as The Oriental. Jardine Strategic has a 79% shareholding in Mandarin Oriental.

In October 2025, Jardine announced they will be buying the rest of the shares of the group, thus taking the group private.

=== Jardine Cycle and Carriage ===
Jardine Cycle & Carriage (JC&C) is an established Singapore-listed company where, as Cycle & Carriage, it has had a presence since 1926. JC&C has an interest of just over 50% in Astra, a listed Indonesian conglomerate and the largest independent automotive group in Southeast Asia, as well as other motor interests in the region. Together with its subsidiaries and associates, Jardine Cycle & Carriage employs 250000 across Indonesia, Malaysia, Singapore, Vietnam, Myanmar, and Thailand. Jardine Cycle & Carriage operates in Singapore, Malaysia, and Myanmar under the Cycle & Carriage banner. The group represents some of the world's best-known motoring marques including Mercedes-Benz, Toyota, Honda and Kia. Jardine Strategic has a 72% shareholding in Jardine Cycle & Carriage.

=== Astra International ===
Astra is Southeast Asia's largest independent automotive diversified business group with seven primary businesses in Indonesia. Operating predominantly in Indonesia, it is a provider of a full range of automobile and motorcycle products in partnerships with companies which include Toyota, Daihatsu, Isuzu, UD Trucks, Peugeot and BMW for automobiles, and Honda for motorcycles. Astra also has a strong presence in the automotive component sector through its subsidiary PT Astra Otoparts Tbk. In addition, Astra has interests in financial services; heavy equipment and mining; agribusiness; infrastructure and logistics; and information technology. In financial services, Astra's businesses provide financial products and services to support its automotive, heavy equipment sales, and general and life insurance.

== Corporate structure ==
Henry Keswick, the company's Tai-pan from 1970 (aged 31) to 1975 and the 6th Keswick to be Tai-pan of the company, is chairman emeritus. His brother, Simon, was the company's Tai-pan from 1983 to 1988 and was the 7th Keswick to be Tai-pan. Both brothers are the 4th generation of Keswicks in the company. The 5th generation of Keswicks are also active within the organisation. Ben Keswick, son of Simon, is executive chairman of Jardine Matheson Group and from 2012 to 2021 was Tai-pan. Adam Keswick, son of Sir Chips Keswick was Deputy managing director. The organizational structure of Jardines has changed fundamentally since its foundation, but the members of the family of Dr. William Jardine still have significant influence in the firm.

=== Directors ===
As of 2021, the directors of Jardine Matheson Holdings were:

- Ben Keswick, executive chairman
- John Witt, managing director
- Y.K. Pang
- Graham Baker
- Stuart Gulliver
- David Hsu
- Julian Hui
- Adam Keswick
- Alex Newbigging
- Anthony Nightingale
- Jeremy Parr
- Percy Weatherall
- Michael Wei Kuo Wu

Lord Sassoon, a former UBS Warburg banker who had been a junior minister in the British Treasury since May 2010, joined Jardine Matheson as an executive board member in January 2013. This appointment brought together members of two great Asian trading dynasties, since Jardine Matheson and the Sassoon family were rivals in the 19th century when they competed to open up and grow trade in Hong Kong and China. He retired on 9 April 2020.

=== Scottish leadership ===
Until 1936, principles of staff recruitment remained Scottish first, Oxbridge second. W. J. Keswick said: "With all due deference to the 'east coast of England' [a reference to Cambridge] I do feel that men from north of the border are the most suitable for our routine business... I am very keen on keeping the Scottish entity of the Firm. But I hope I have not conveyed that I have swung against the University man... I merely consider that he must be aided and abettered by the solid, plodding type from Scotland."

Jardines is controlled by the Keswick family, who are direct descendants of William Jardine's sister Jean through the marriage of her daughter to Thomas Keswick, father of William Keswick, an early Tai-pan of the firm. While the leadership of Jardines is Scottish, the firm is international in its dealings. The staff of Jardines is predominantly Asian, with senior management levels composed of a mixture of British and other Europeans, Chinese, Indonesians, Australians and Americans.

The Keswicks have maintained a relationship with another prominent Scottish family, the Flemings, of which the author Ian Fleming was also a member. From 1970 until 1998, Jardine Matheson operated a pan-Asian investment banking joint venture, Jardine Fleming, with Robert Fleming & Co., a London merchant bank controlled by the Fleming family. In 2000, Jardine Fleming and Robert Fleming & Co. were sold to JP Morgan Chase.

== Influence ==
- Jardines' history was the inspiration for a series of novels written by James Clavell, including Tai-Pan (1966), Noble House (1981), Whirlwind (1986) and Gai-Jin (1993). The Noble House TV miniseries actually used the Jardine building as the headquarters of Struan's & Co., the fictional company depicted in Clavell's novels. In Tai-Pan, Dirk Struan is loosely based on William Jardine while Robb Struan is loosely based on James Matheson.
- Jardines installed the first elevator in China in the northern city of Tianjin.
- Many streets in present-day Hong Kong are named after the firm, its founders and past Tai-pans, mostly concentrated in Hong Kong's East Point and Causeway Bay Districts, where Jardines' offices were located in the early days. The name of Yee Wo Street comes from Jardine's Chinese name "Yee Wo" (怡和) whilst other streets associated with the company include Jardine's Bazaar, Jardine's Crescent, Jardine's Bridge, Jardine's Lookout, Matheson Street, Leighton Road, Percival Street and Paterson Street.
- Jardines is responsible for maintaining the tradition of firing the Noonday Gun, a duty said to have been imposed on them by a new Senior Naval Officer on hearing them fire a salute for the Taipan when his schooner arrived in Hong Kong as they had no official authority to fire salutes. The practice was immortalised in Noël Coward's song "Mad Dogs and Englishmen".

== See also ==
- List of trading companies
