= John Reid (merchant) =

Scottish merchant

John Reid (1757 – 11 April 1821) was a Scottish merchant in Canton in the late eighteenth century, where he was in partnership with John Henry Cox and Daniel Beale.

== Early life ==
Reid was born in Tain in Ross-shire, Scotland in 1757, the second son of John Reid (1725–1779), Bailie of Tain, and his wife Mary Ross (1725–1808).

By 1779 he was in Canton acting as the Austrian Emperor's Consul.

== Partnerships ==
Reid took on multiple business relationships in Canton, as well as trading on his own account. He was in partnership with a man named Bourgoyne of the French Hong.

In January 1781 John Henry Cox, son of the well known London clockmaker James Cox who had become bankrupt in Canton in 1774, arrived in Macau to try to retrieve some of his father's bad debts and to sell off his remaining stock. He and Jack Reid went into partnership under the name Cox & Reid. The firm acted as agents for India-based shippers who were bringing in raw cotton, cotton piece goods and opium. The partners bought two small ships of their own (the ‘Supply’ and the ‘Enterprise) to trade on their own account. In 1783 the firm was joined by Daniel Beale.

In 1785:

“Sensing a good thing, the firm of Cox and Reid bought a small brig of 60 tons, (called the ‘Harmon’ but renamed the ‘Sea Otter’) under the command of Captain James Hanna, and despatched the little vessel with a small cargo of woollens, blankets, iron bars, knives, nails, etc. and a supply of ornaments and baubles to the north-west coast of America, to barter with the ‘Red Indians’ in Canada for furs. The area was supposed to be a preserve of the South Sea Company, of London, but this did not seem to worry Cox and his friends in the least. Five hundred and sixty sea-otter skins were obtained and landed and sold at Canton for over £5,000”.

In 1786, trading under the fictitious name of the 'Austrian East India Company’ (supposedly taken from the earlier legitimate company which had gone bankrupt in 1785), the partners bought in London a 400-ton ship called the Loudoun, fitted her out there and renamed her Imperial Eagle. With false papers (to avoid paying license fees to the East India Company) and flying the Austrian flag she sailed on 24 November from Ostend under Captain Charles William Barkley for Nootka Sound, Vancouver Island via Cape Horn. After various adventures she returned to China towards the end of 1787 with 800 furs which were sold in Macao for 30,000 Spanish silver dollars.

Reid was also the agent for Willem Bolts's Trieste Company: the partnership Gildart & Reid in London was involved with the Trieste Company in the early 1780s. Thomas Gildart in London sold ships such as the Duke of Grafton to them. Reid was doing business for Gildart & Reid in Canton for some time after 1784. In the following years his brothers Andrew and David took up the positions.

Ultimately Reid suffered bankruptcy. He had been trading on his own account in Canton, and had run up business losses. He left Canton in February 1787 on the East India Company ship Ganges. (782 tons).

The firm of Cox & Beale, with the later addition of Reid's younger brother David (1761–1845), who left Canton in 1801, eventually became Jardine Matheson. Gildart & Reid existed in Bishopsgate in 1791, when Gouverneur Morris consulted them about bonds.

== Later life ==
On Reid's return to London he joined his older brother Andrew Reid as a distiller and wine and spirit merchant. When Andrew Reid invested in and became a partner in Meux's Brewery in 1793, Jack also became a partner.

In 1795 Jack married Ann Holland (1768-1848), the daughter of a clergyman. Meux's Brewery became Meux Reid, and after an acrimonious split with the Meux family in 1808, in 1816 became Reid's Brewery.

Jack lived at 48 Bedford Square, London, next door to his brother Andrew at no 46, and also owned Kingswood Lodge in Egham, Surrey. At his death on 11 April 1821 he was still the owner of five £10,000 shares in Reid's Brewery.
