= Astra Tower (Jakarta) =

Coordinates: 6.207162°S 106.821494°E

Astra Tower (Menara Astra)
- Interactive map of the Astra Tower (Menara Astra) area

General information
- Type: Office
- Location: Jakarta, Indonesia, Jalan Jenderal Sudirman, Kav-5
- Construction started: 2014
- Completed: 2017
- Opened: 20 February 2019
- Cost: Rp 8 trillion
- Owner: Astra International

Height
- Architectural: 261.5 m (858 ft)
- Tip: 261.5 m
- Top floor: 235 m (771 ft)

Technical details
- Floor count: 63
- Lifts/elevators: 28

Design and construction
- Architects: Nikken Sekkei (design); Airmas Asri
- Developer: Astra Land
- Structural engineer: Arup
- Main contractor: Shimizu Corporation

Astra Tower is a skyscraper located at Jalan Jenderal Sudirman in Jakarta, Indonesia. It is an office building with 63 floors and a private helipad. The podium of the tower has retail space and a food court, and a 1,000-person capacity conference hall.

The tower hosted several diplomatic missions such as the Embassy of Cyprus and the European Union Delegation Office both located on 38th floor. On 2025, Albania opened its embassy in the tower, first time since Indonesia and Albania established diplomatic relations in 1965.

Also in the same complex are the Anandamaya Residences on an area of 2.4-hectares, comprising three residential towers named Anandamaya Residences 1, 2 and 3. The total project cost US$600 million.

PT DAIKIN Airconditioning Indonesia, officially chose Menara Astra building as the new DAIKIN Indonesia headquarters. It was announced in August 22, 2023.

== See also ==
- List of tallest buildings in Jakarta
- List of tallest buildings in Indonesia
