= John Henry Cox =

British explorer (c. 1750–1791)

- Born: c. 1750; London, United Kingdom
- Died: 5 October 1791 (aged 41); Whampoa, Canton, China
- Occupation: Explorer

John Henry Cox (c. 1750 – 5 October 1791) was an English explorer who charted Great Oyster Bay, Maria Island, and Marion Bay on the east coast of Tasmania in 1789, aboard his armed brig HMS Mercury.

== Early years ==
John Henry Cox was born c. 1750, the son of a rich jewellery merchant in London. His father James had a factory in Shoe Lane, which specialised in the manufacture of clocks and automatons (known as "sing-songs" in pidgin English), designed as bribes for Chinese mandarins who were in control of the native merchants with whom Europeans were obliged to deal in trade negotiations in Canton. He even published a work on his activity. When his father died towards the end of the 1770s, Cox turned to the East India Company for permission to stay in China for three years to sell the residue of his father's stock of clocks, and ostensibly "for his health's sake". In May 1780 he was given permission to stay for two years and February 1781 saw him installed at Canton as a merchant, but privately and not under the control of the company.

When the two years had passed, he applied for a year's extension, which was granted because of his "good bearing" and because he had been of special help to certain company chiefs. Cox then found it advantageous to move to Macao, where he was in association with a Scot, John Reid – who from 1779 had been Austrian consul and a naturalised Austrian subject – together with another Scotsman, Prussian consul Daniel Beale. All of their subterfuges were aimed at bypassing the East India Company's restrictive regulations.

In 1784 Cox branched out and, with some of his associates connected with the East India Company, financed the first maritime fur trade voyage to the northwest coast of America, with the goal of acquiring sea otter furs to sell in Macao or Canton. In 1779 the crews of Captain Cook's ships, after Cook's death, had discovered that the sea otter furs they had acquired at Nootka Sound could be sold in Canton for an enormous profit, and this information spread quickly after the official account of Cook's third voyage was published in 1784. Cox, wanting to capitalize on this discovery, acquired and outfitted a small 60 ton brig named Sea Otter, commanded by James Hanna. Cook had noted that the Indigenous peoples of the Pacific Northwest Coast near Hinchinbrook Island were eager for pieces of iron at least 8–10 inches (20–25 cm) long and 1–2 inches (2.5–5.1 cm) wide. So Hanna took a cargo of iron bars and other trade goods. Hanna sailed from Macao in April, 1785, and arrived at Nootka Sound, Vancouver Island, in August. The native Nuu-chah-nulth attempted to board and seize Sea Otter, but were repulsed with considerable slaughter. Hanna treated the wounded and a great deal of trading occurred. Near the end of September Hanna sailed for China via the Hawaiian Islands, arriving at Macao in late December, 1785. He had acquired 560 sea otter pelts, which were sold to Chinese merchants for 20,400 Spanish dollars—making the voyage a significant financial success.

Business went so well, that Cox and his associates founded the Bengal Fur Society in Calcutta and continued their activity into the following years. James Hanna made a second voyage in Sea Otter, from 1786 to 1787. This voyage was less successful than the first, but plans were made for a third voyage. However, these voyages led to Lord Cornwallis, Bengal's general governor, in 1787 complaining to the East India Company, all to no avail. By this time, other British ship captains had joined in the maritime fur trade, such as James Strange, John Meares, George Dixon, Nathaniel Portlock, as well as the Americans John Kendrick and Robert Gray of the ships Columbia Rediviva and Lady Washington. Evidence of their activity remains in the "Columbia" and Washington medals, which Boston merchants struck to celebrate the sailing in September 1787 of these two US vessels for the northwest coast of America. The British Admiralty had in 1772 issued similar medals (struck by Matthew Boulton) featuring HMS Resolution and HMS Adventure celebrating James Cook's second voyage.

== Mercury ==
=== Swedish endorsement ===
Cox, at this stage, having already considerably overstayed his welcome, thought it wise to disappear to England for a spell but was soon back with newly hatched plans. This time, his idea was to see whether he could exploit the Russo-Swedish War of 1788–90. He paid a visit first to Gothenburg, where he made good use of the services of the Swedish East India Company's representatives there, William Chalmers, Lars Gotheen and J.A. Sandberg. Through these men he was able to make contact with Baron Erik Ruuth who was Secretary of State for Commerce and Finance to the Swedish king.

The king was apparently very enthusiastic about Cox's quite fantastic proposal which was in effect to put his brig Mercury, newly purchased from the renowned Marmaduke Stalkartt, Deptford, at the disposal of Sweden and with her act as a privateer to raid both the eastern Russian coasts and their North American fur and skin establishments, for which Sweden would earn ten percent of the prizes. The last page of the king's instructions is signed by the king as "Gustaf" at "Ghiöteborg" (Gothenburg) on 11 November 1788 and refers to his authorisation to Captain John Henry Cox of the Swedish naval brig Gustaf den Tredie, (Gustaf III), Mercury's cover-name.

=== England to Tasmania ===
The Thames was still suffering under extreme weather conditions that winter, with the river frozen, and Mercury was not able to leave Gravesend on her prospective long voyage before 26 February 1789, but under English colours, as her destination was to be kept secret. Cox had provided himself with a chronometer made by William Hughes of Holborn and had it set to GMT in the mathematical school in Christ's Hospital, the headmaster of which was William Wales, who had sailed as astronomer in Captain Cook's second voyage from 1772 to 1775. Cox had originally intended taking the route via Cape Horn, but on account of the late departure decided to change this plan and take the route via the Cape of Good Hope.

Lieut. George Mortimer of the Marines wrote an account of the voyage. Unfortunately he records almost no details of the ship's crew but does mention the death of the ship's cook Thomas Smith on 8 October 1789. He also mentions that Cox had invited a number of his friends, making it sound almost like a rich man's yacht cruise. On 25 March they sailed from Tenerife, crossed the Line in 20 degrees West and on 28 April they were passing Tristan da Cunha. Just about then, Captain William Bligh of HMS Bounty and the loyal members of the crew were being forced into the long boat by the mutineers led by Fletcher Christian. On 29 May Mercury reached their first objective, Amsterdam Island in the Roaring Forties, halfway between Africa and Australia, discovered in 1522 by del Cano during his circumnavigation. Here they procured 1,000 seal skins and several barrels of oil. Mortimer believed that Mercury was probably the first English vessel to visit the island. He refers to Alexander Dalrymple's Account of the Discoveries Made in the S. Pacific Ocean, (London, 1767), which deals with the island, and states that the account by the Dutchman Willem de Vlamingh, first to land on the island, in 1696, though short, was tolerably accurate. On 8 July Mercury was anchoring in a bay on the east coast of Van Diemen's Land, now Tasmania, for wood and water, and Cox named it Oyster Bay, a name that still holds. He also charted Maria Island and Marion Bay there.

=== Crossing the Pacific ===
They reached Tahiti on 13 August and anchored in Matavai Bay, where Bounty had lain for many months. Although some of the mutineers had remained, it was assumed that they lay hidden while Mercury was there. Mortimer communicated the intelligence to the Admiralty in respect of the probable destination of the Bounty mutineers, "as it is hoped will enable Captain Edwards of the Pandora frigate to bring them to that condign punishment they so justly merit". Captain Edwards' name appears on the list of subscribers to Mortimer's book.

Mercury stayed at Hawaii for only about two days between 23 and 25 September. On 27 October they were anchored in an inlet on Unalaska Island, one of the Fox Islands of the Aleutian Islands. They had come a month or two too late, and found that the natives had no furs to trade, but they did stay for about two weeks, which seemed long enough for the United States to name one of the Alaskan rivers Coxe, using the spelling of his name that he used when referring to his Swedish assignment. It seems in fact that Cox only took the brig there as a gesture of fulfilling the contract with the Swedish king. Apparently he had considered returning at a more suitable time, but the Russian-Swedish Treaty of Värälä signed on 14 August 1790 precluded any such plans. If Cox had gone prowling further afield round the North Pacific he might have found unexpected and surprising opposition; the Empress Catherine II had commissioned an expedition to carry out exploration work in the far east of Siberia and the Bering Sea. In charge of the Expedition was an Englishman in the Russian Naval Service, Commodore Joseph Billings, who was alerted regarding Cox's presence, but far too late, for by that time Cox was back in Macao, where he anchored on 27 December 1789, careful to advertise the appearance of the Swedish armed brig "Gustavus III" commanded by Captain John Henry Cox of the Swedish Royal Navy. He lost no time in writing a report to the Directors of the Swedish East India Co on 4 January 1790.

=== Northern Pacific ===
Port Cox (since renamed Clayoquot Sound), a bay southeast of Nootka Sound on the west coast of Vancouver Island, and Cox's Channel, a strait at the northwestern tip of Haida Gwaii between Langara Island and Graham Island and now named Parry Passage are named after Cox, as is Cox Island, in the same area of Haida Gwaii. According to the record in the Geographic Names Information System (GNIS), the nation's official geographic names repository of the US Board of Geographic Names, the mouth of the Coxe River, (note spelling) where it empties into Katlian Bay is at 57°10′24″N 135°16′37″W. The source, or where the stream begins, is at 57°11′41″N 135°11′58″W.

Cox appears to have intended to use the Swedish contract more as a talisman with which to confound the East India Company rather than wreak any damage on the Russians. Some evidence of this lies in the fact Mortimer's account has no mention of any gun drill, something that ought to have been a necessary part of the operation; only once does Mortimer mention even airing their powder.

Excessive speculation drove Reid into bankruptcy. He therefore closed the Austrian Consulate and left China. Cox's partnership however with Daniel Beale and his younger brother Thomas continued, at any rate under the combined name, during Cox's long period away from Canton. There were further successful voyages to northwest America, always under the Portuguese flag. However, in later years, competition from Spanish ships began to have effect. After his return to Canton, Cox was quickly in business again in Macao.

It was at the end of September 1791 that Cox sailed Mercury up the river to Canton's outer port Whampoa. The Honourable East India Company did not welcome him; on the contrary it threatened Cox in every way, refusing to allow him right of residence because it was considered that he, English citizen that he was, had broken the company's "sacred" monopoly. Nonetheless, Cox raised a Prussian flag and landed exuding disrespectful protests.

== Death ==
Cox did not live long enough to really enjoy the fortune he had amassed and died aged 41 years, on 5 October 1791 and was buried the following day on French Island that lay within sight of the ships moored at Whampoa, and was where all foreigners who died at Canton, or aboard the ships, were interred at the end of the 18th century.

== Bibliography ==
- Robert J. King, "Heinrich Zimmermann and the Proposed Voyage of the KKS Cobenzell to the North West Coast in 1782–1783", The Northern Mariner, vol.21, no.3, July 2011, pp. 235–262.
- Robert J. King, "John Meares: Dubliner, Naval Officer, Fur Trader and would-be Colonizer", Journal of Australian Naval History, vol.8, no.1, March 2011, pp. 32–62.
- Mortimer, Lieut. George (1791). Observations & Remarks Made During a Voyage to the North West Coast of America. London.
- West, John (1852). The history of Tasmania. Launceston, Tasmania: H. Dowling. OCLC 18133771.
- Williamson, A. Robert (1975), Eastern traders: some men and ships of Jardine, Matheson & Company and their contemporaires [sic] in the East India Company's Maritime service; a collection of articles, Jardine, Matheson & Co.
