= TrustFord =

Car dealership company in the UK

Ford Retail Group Ltd.
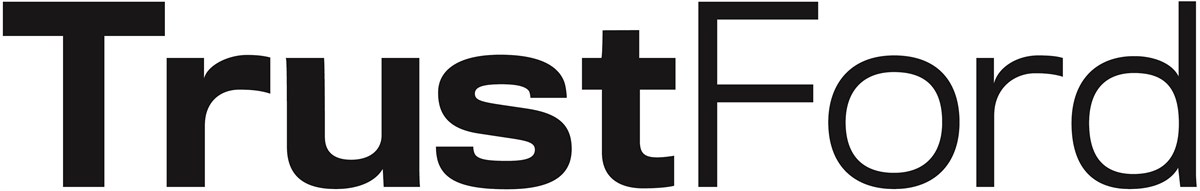
- Formerly: Polar Ford (1998–2004)
- Industry: Automotive
- Founded: 1998; 28 years ago
- Founder: Ford Motor Company
- Headquarters: Colchester, Essex, U.K.
- Number of locations: Worldwide
- Key people: Stuart Mustoe (chairman, CEO); John Leeman (Director of Dealer Operations)
- Products: New and used cars
- Number of employees: 2958 (2007)
- Parent: Ford of Britain
- Website: trustford.co.uk

Ford Retail Group Ltd., currently operating as TrustFord, is an operator of franchised motorcar dealerships in the United Kingdom and the Channel Islands that is now owned by Ford of Europe. In addition to selling both new and used Ford and Iveco cars and commercial vehicles, Ford Retail Group dealerships also operate their full garage workshop, repair and service centre.

== History ==
In October 1998, Jardine Motors Group announced a joint venture with the manufacturer for its Ford dealerships. The merged firm was named Polar Ford.

The following year, Polar Ford purchased Dagenham Motors. In May 2002, Polar Ford purchased a further three dealerships in North London from Stripestar, and Alperton Ford in February 2003, before Jardine sold their 51% stake in the joint venture to Ford in March 2004, at which point the company became known as Ford Retail Group.

By 2014, Ford Retail Group was operating under a number of different names:

- Dagenham Ford – primarily located in London and the surrounding counties;
- Polar Ford – primarily located in Yorkshire and North West England;
- Brunel Ford – located in South West England;
- Heartlands Ford – Birmingham and surrounding area;
- Lindsay Ford – Northern Ireland;
- Bougourd Ford – Guernsey;
- La Motte Ford – Jersey;
- Ford Online;
- Ford Online Parts.

As a result, the company took the decision that year to rebrand all its activities under the single name of TrustFord.
