= Cycle & Carriage =

Car dealership chain

Cycle and Carriage
- Company type: Subsidiary of Jardine Matheson Group
- Industry: Land transportation Automotive
- Founded: 1899
- Defunct: 2002
- Fate: Integrated into Jardine Matheson
- Headquarters: Singapore; Malaysia
- Area served: Asia
- Products: Sells: Mercedes-Benz, Mitsubishi, Kia Motors and Citroën
- Services: Retail, distribution and provision of after-sales services
- Parent: Jardine Matheson Group
- Website: www.jcclgroup.com

Cycle and Carriage was a car dealership chain founded in 1899, and based in Singapore and Malaysia.

Cycle and Carriage was one of the premier dealerships in colonial Malaya and Singapore and had been a major dealer for Mercedes-Benz, Mitsubishi, Chrysler, Jaguar, Kia, and Citroën motor vehicles.

In 2002, it was acquired by the Hong Kong–based Jardine Matheson Group and is now named Jardine Cycle & Carriage.

== History ==
Cycle and Carriage (C&C) was founded in 1899 by the Chua brothers as Federal Stores, beginning as a sundry store in Kuala Lumpur, near the present day Pasar Seni station, and relocated to Market Square in 1904, of which building still exists today (3°8′49″N 100°41′47″E). The company was incorporated in 1926 and relocated to the then-Strait Settlement of Singapore.

In 1951, the company was awarded the distributorship for Mercedes-Benz. Other brands followed, including Plymouth, Fargo, Jowett, Tilling-Stevens, Vulcan, Singer, and Renault.

By 1964, the latter seven had been dropped or discontinued, but Auto Union, DKW, Chrysler, Valiant, Imperial, Willys, Jaguar, BSA, Trojan, and Simca vehicles had been added. When the Malayan Federation started promoting local assembly of cars in 1963, C&C was one of the early takers. At the time, they held the franchises for Mercedes-Benz, Chrysler, and Jaguar, and they began assembling Mercedes-Benz cars in 1965 (in Singapore) and Mitsubishis in 1968 (in Tampoi, Johor, Malaysia).

C&C was listed on the then Malaysian and Singapore Stock Exchange in 1969, and then on the Bursa Malaysia in 1977. The company was part of the Straits Times Index, before being delisted upon acquisition by Jardine Matheson in 2002. After the merger, it is now listed under the name of Jardine Cycle & Carriage.
