= Astra Agro Lestari =

Company of Indonesia

PT Astra Agro Lestari Tbk
- Company type: Public
- Traded as: IDX: AALI
- Industry: plantation
- Founded: 1981; 45 years ago
- Headquarters: Jakarta, Indonesia
- Area served: Indonesia
- Products: Palm oil
- Revenue: Rp 14.12 trillion (2016)
- Net income: Rp 2 trillion (2016)
- Total assets: Rp 24.226 trillion (2016)
- Number of employees: 35,400 (2016)
- Parent: Astra International
- Website: www.astra-agro.co.id

Astra Agro Lestari Tbk. (AAL) is the second biggest palm oil company in Indonesia. It is a subsidiary of PT Astra International Tbk. At least in 2004, it controlled extensive land banks. It has two concessions on peatlands in Riau, with an estimated total area of 20,000 hectares.

AAL is Indonesia's second largest palm oil company and according to FIDH, "supplies Crude Palm Oil (CPO) through its mills to various consumer companies, including Procter & Gamble, Hershey's, Kellogg, Unilever, Mondelēz, Colgate-Palmolive, PepsiCo, and Nestlé, amongst others."

According to Greenpeace, 2007, it has seven concessions on peat in Central Kalimantan. Greenpeace also reported hotspots on five Astra Agro concessions in Riau, two of which were on peatlands. Joko Supriyono was or is a director at Astra Agro and secretary of a palm oil industry lobby group. He said companies had no choice, but to continue establishing plantations on restricted areas.

The company was listed on the Indonesia Stock Exchange in 1997.

== Criticism ==
Astra Agro Lestari has been accused of "criminalisation, human rights abuses and land grabbing" in Indonesia by indigenous groups and human rights organisations like Global Witness. Global Witness have also criticised members of GFANZ for continuing to invest in companies accused of contributing to deforestation like AAL. Friends of the Earth have also published a report accusing AAL of responsibility for "longstanding land rights abuses and environmental destruction in operations undertaken without proper legal permits." The claims were repeated by PepsiCo and FrieslandCampina in 2023.
