= Jardine Cycle & Carriage =

Subsidiary of Jardines

Jardine Cycle & Carriage Limited
- Formerly: Cycle & Carriage
- Company type: Public
- Traded as: SGX: C07
- Industry: Diversified
- Headquarters: Singapore
- Areas served: Singapore, Malaysia, Indonesia, Thailand, Vietnam, Myanmar
- Key people: Benjamin Birks, (Managing Director)
- Revenue: US$22.2. billion (2023)
- Operating income: US$3.1 billion (2023)
- Net income: US$3.7 billion (2023)
- Number of employees: 250,000 (2019)
- Parent: Jardines
- Subsidiaries: List: Astra International (50.1%) THACO (26.6%) Refrigeration Electrical Engineering Corporation (29.0%) Siam City Cement Group (25.5%) Cycle & Carriage Singapore (100%) Cycle & Carriage Bintang Bhd (59.1%) Cycle & Carriage Myanmar (60%) Tunas Ridean (46.2%) Vinamilk (10.6%)
- Website: www.jcclgroup.com

Jardine Cycle & Carriage Limited (SGX: C07 ) is the investment holding company of Jardines in Southeast Asia. It is currently 75% held by the conglomerate.

The company was listed on the Singapore Exchange in 1969 as Cycle & Carriage Limited before it renamed to Jardine Cycle & Carriage Limited in 2004 following the integration into Jardines in 2002.

== History ==
It was first founded as Federal Stores in 1899 by a trader in nutmeg and sundries on Jalan Bandar (High Street) in Kuala Lumpur, Malaysia. On 15 June 1899, it was renamed Cycle & Carriage by its founders, the Chua brothers, and thereafter, it expanded to sell bicycles, motorcycles, and eventually motor cars. In 1904, Cycle & Carriage shifted to the corner of High Street, Market Street and Market Square (3°8′49″N 101°41′47″E) and subsequently expanded to Ipoh, Penang and Singapore.

During World War I, Cycle & Carriage suffered economically as a result of the shortage of supply for cars. The war, however, encouraged the development of automobile technology, stimulating interest in the motor car, and spurring demand for Cycle & Carriage's products in 1918. In that year, Cycle & Carriage was registered in the Federated Malay States with $250,000 in registered capital. In 1926, Cycle & Carriage shifted its headquarters to Orchard Road in Singapore, with capital of SG$5 million and registered as a public company known as The Cycle & Carriage Company (1926) Limited.

World War II caused the company to cease operations, and its workshops, motor cars and trucks were absorbed by the Japanese during the Japanese occupation of Malaya and the Japanese occupation of Singapore. Following that in 1951, Cycle & Carriage was awarded the Mercedes-Benz franchise in Singapore, the first to carry the marque in Southeast Asia.

Cycle & Carriage launched plans to build an assembly plant in Hillview, Singapore. On 4 March 1965, the Minister for Finance Goh Keng Swee laid the foundation stone for the $2.5 million plant, and predicted that it would create 10,000 new jobs over the following five years. In 1969, the company launched an initial public offering, which was oversubscribed by 73 times, with a total offering of $242 million - which amounted to just a little short of the budget for the Ministry of Interior and Defense for that year.

By 1999, Jardines was a major shareholder in Cycle & Carriage, with a 24.6% stake. In 2002, Cycle & Carriage became a subsidiary of Jardines when Jardine Strategic increased its stake to over 50%. In recognition of its distinguished operating history, and in the interests of integration to Jardines, it was renamed Jardine Cycle & Carriage.

In June 2023, Jardine Cycle & Carriage entered into a partnership with Carro, an online car markeptplace, valued at more than $60 million.

== Portfolio ==
=== Astra International ===
Jardine Cycle & Carriage has a 50.1% interest in Astra, a diversified group listed on the Indonesia Stock Exchange, with seven core businesses – automotive, financial services, heavy equipment, mining, construction and energy, agribusiness, infrastructure and logistics, information technology and property.

Astra is the largest independent automotive group in Southeast Asia. Its automotive business comprises the manufacture, distribution, retail and aftersales service as well as financing of motor vehicles and motorcycles. It is the sole distributor of Toyota, Daihatsu, Isuzu and Peugeot motor vehicles, a dealer of BMW motor vehicles and UD Trucks as well as a manufacturer and distributor of Honda motorcycles. Astra also manufactures and distributes automotive components. Astra’s financial services consist of consumer financing for motor vehicles and motorcycles, heavy equipment financing and banking, as well as general and life insurance. In addition, Astra is the sole distributor of Komatsu heavy equipment, and participates in general construction, mining services and thermal power businesses. Astra’s agribusiness includes the cultivation, harvesting and processing of palm oil. Its infrastructure and logistics businesses include toll roads development and management, with a total interest in 353 km of toll roads. Astra is also the sole distributor of Fuji Xerox office equipment in Indonesia. Astra’s property business includes the Grade A office building, Menara Astra, the 509-unit Anandamaya Residences and two residential development projects, namely Arumaya in South Jakarta and Asya in East Jakarta, as well as a 3-hectare (7.4-acre) residential and commercial development in Jakarta's Central Business District.

=== Focus in Vietnam ===
==== Truong Hai Auto Corporation ====
In 2008, Jardine Cycle & Carriage acquired 20.5% interest in Truong Hai Auto Corporation (THACO), Jardine Cycle & Carriage's shareholding now stands at 26.6%. THACO is a multi-business group with interests in automotive, property development, agriculture and logistics. THACO is the largest automotive company in Vietnam, it manufactures, assembles, distributes, retails and provides aftersales service of commercial and passenger vehicles, representing BMW, Kia, Mazda, Mini, Peugeot, Foton and Fuso. It also engages in residential and commercial property development, as well as agriculture in Vietnam, Laos and Cambodia. Additionally, THACO provides logistics services from warehousing, freight forwarding to seaport services.

==== Refrigeration Electrical Engineering Corporation ====
Refrigeration Electrical Engineering Corporation (REE Corp) is a diversified business group in Vietnam, listed on the Ho Chi Minh Stock Exchange. With 29.0% held by Jardine Cycle & Carriage, REE Corp has operations in power and water utility infrastructure, property and M&E services. Jardine Cycle & Carriage first acquired a 10.24% interest in REE Corp in 2012.

==== Vinamilk ====
Vinamilk is the largest dairy producer in Vietnam with about 59% domestic market share and is also one of the largest companies by market capitalisation on the Ho Chi Minh Stock Exchange. In 2017, Jardine Cycle & Carriage first acquired an interest in Vinamilk and currently holds a 10.6% stake in the company. Vinamilk is known for its wide range of dairy products which are sold across 250,000 retail points in Vietnam and exported across the region. The company has also topped Forbes Vietnam's top 50 brands in Vietnam listed companies for seven consecutive years.

=== Siam City Cement ===
In 2015, Jardine Cycle & Carriage acquired a 24.9% interest in Siam City Cement, the second largest cement manufacturer in Thailand. Siam City Cement also has a leading presence in South Vietnam, Thailand, Cambodia and Bangladesh. Jardine Cycle & Carriage now holds 25.5% in Siam City Cement. SCCC is listed on the Stock Exchange of Thailand and operates across South and Southeast Asia, producing cement, concrete and other building materials.

== Automotive ==
=== Cycle & Carriage Singapore ===
Cycle & Carriage (100%) is a leading automotive group in Singapore. It is engaged in the distribution, retail and aftersales service of Mercedes-Benz, Mitsubishi, Kia, Citroën, DS Automobiles and Maxus motor vehicles. It also retails used cars under its Republic Auto brand and has a car leasing business in Singapore. It is also the exclusive distributor of BYD electric forklifts in Singapore.

=== Cycle & Carriage Bintang (Malaysia) ===
Cycle & Carriage Bintang (59.1%) is listed on Bursa Malaysia. With an extensive network of 13 outlets across the country, Cycle & Carriage Bintang is a leading Mercedes-Benz dealer group in Malaysia, providing sales and aftersales services for Mercedes-Benz passenger cars and commercial vehicles, which includes Fuso trucks.

=== Cycle & Carriage Myanmar ===
In 2013, Jardine Cycle & Carriage established a 60% joint-venture, Cycle & Carriage Myanmar, which distributes, retails and provides aftersales services for Mercedes-Benz and Mazda passenger cars and commercial vehicles, as well as Fuso commercial vehicles in Myanmar.

=== Tunas Ridean ===
Tunas Ridean (46.2%) is listed on the Indonesia Stock Exchange and is a leading automotive dealer group in Indonesia. It represents Toyota, Daihatsu, BMW and Isuzu motor vehicles, as well as Honda motorcycles. Tunas Ridean also offers automotive rental and fleet management services. Additionally, it provides vehicle financing through its associate, Mandiri Tunas Finance.
