= Jardine Motors Group =

British car dealership chain

- Type: Subsidiary
- Industry: Car dealerships
- Products: New Cars, Used Cars, Servicing
- Revenue: $5.13 billion (2012)
- Net income: $61 million (2012)
- Parent: Jardines
- Website: www.jardinemotors.co.uk

Jardine Motors Group, is a multi-national operator of franchised motorcar dealerships in the United Kingdom with international outlets in Hong Kong, Macau and China. Jardine Motors Group market their vehicles under a series of brands worldwide including Zung Fu, Lancaster and Scotthall, and the worldwide group net profit, for the year ended 30 April 2012, was US$61 Million, based on revenue of US$5.3 billion.

The company is a subsidiary of Jardines and is headquartered at Quarry Bay, Hong Kong.

== Jardine Motors UK ==
Jardine Motors UK was created in 1981 when Jardine Matheson acquired a stake in the East Anglian motor company; Lancaster Group, from its founders Ronald and Nicholas Lancaster.

Jardine Motors UK was at one stage the largest UK automotive group by turnover, but today has fallen behind rivals such as Pendragon and Sytner and is now one of the top 10. In 2014, Jardine Motors UK turned over £1.5 billion

=== History ===
Lancaster Group was established in 1969 when Ronald and Nicholas Lancaster took control of a Ford dealership in Ongar, Essex, where Nick had been working. By 1981 Lancaster were running Mercedes-Benz, Porsche, Ferrari and Volvo dealerships in East Anglia, and Hong Kong–based Jardine Matheson purchased a 76% holding in the company. The company was floated on the stock market as Lancaster plc in 1986. Jardine took total ownership of Lancaster plc in 1992. Nicholas Lancaster left the business to run Malaya Group plc, which would purchase HR Owen in 1994.

During the 1990s the company made a series of acquisitions including the purchase of a Land Rover/Rover Dealership in Stratford, London from Malaya Group in 1994, Wiggins BMW, Winchester in January 1995, Polar Motors in February 1995, Kent based Loxley KJ in October 1995, BPW Group in April 1997 and Appleyard Group in October 1997. The merger with Appleyard resulted in Jardine becoming the largest UK dealer group that year.

By the end of 1998, Jardine announced a joint venture with the manufacturer for its Ford dealerships, a venture which by the end of January the following year had purchased Dagenham Motors. In the late 1990s and early 2000s, Jardine struggled to integrate the Appleyard businesses and saw profits slide, but acquisitions soon resumed. Polar Ford purchased three North London dealerships from Stripestar in May 2002 and Alperton Ford in February 2003, before Jardine sold their 51% stake in the joint venture to Ford Retail Group in March 2004.

Jardine posted strong results for 2005 and continued its expansion with new dealership openings such as Lamborghini in Reading and McLaren in One Hyde Park in London and by purchase of existing dealers from others; e.g. Milcars BMW in 2003, Marshall Honda in Reading in 2006, Pilling Land Rover in Welwyn Garden City, Merritts Jaguar in Amersham in 2010, the Wayside Group in 2011 and five Toyota and Lexus sites in 2012.

=== Today ===
Jardine Motors UK today have 70 sales and service locations across the UK representing Aston Martin, Audi, BMW, Ferrari, Jaguar, INEOS, Land Rover, Maserati, McLaren, Mercedes-Benz, MINI, Porsche, Smart and Jardine Select.

Although some dealerships historically operated under a variety of brands including Scotthall, Appleyard, Minories, Abridge and Clover Leaf Cars, all dealerships now operate under the Jardine brand.

== Zung Fu Company ==
Zung Fu Company Limited (仁孚行有限公司) was acquired by Jardine's in the 1990s, having originally been established in Hong Kong in the early 1950s.

=== Hong Kong ===
Zung Fu brought the first Mercedes-Benz vehicle to Hong Kong in 1954 and opened their first showroom the following year. Since then Zung Fu have operated as the exclusive retailer for the brand in the region.

Zung Fu operations in Hong Kong now include three sales dealerships and six Service Centres representing Mercedes-Benz, Smart and, through Hyundai Hong Kong Co. Ltd; two Hyundai showrooms and a service centre.

=== Macau ===
Through Zung Fu Motors (Macau) Ltd. the group operate a Mercedes-Benz showroom and Mercedes-Benz Service Centre, both in Taipa.

=== China ===
Zung Fu (China) set up its first repair workshops in mainland China in 1986, at a time when the country was not seen as a market for luxury vehicles and when the operations of foreign companies, such as Zung Fu, were restricted by the government. Building on the existing Mercedes-Benz relationship, an authorised Service Centre was opened in Shenzhen in 1993, but government restrictions still prevented from operating sales dealerships in the country.

China joined the World Trade Organisation in November 2001, one of the conditions of which was that foreign companies would be treated the same as Chinese companies. This paved the way for Zung Fu to open their first sales dealership in Guangzhou in 2001, quickly followed by the first dealership in Sichuan province, located in Chengdu.

As of 2012, Zung Fu Mercedes-Benz operations total fourteen dealerships, ten further showrooms and a service centre, with the group also operating two Smart dealerships. Between 2008 and 2010, Zung Fu's car sales grew from 5,448 to 16,292, and net profit increased by US$19.9 million to US$37.5 million.

== See also ==
- Jardine Matheson
- History of Jardine, Matheson & Co.
