= Astra International =

Indonesian conglomerate

PT Astra International Tbk
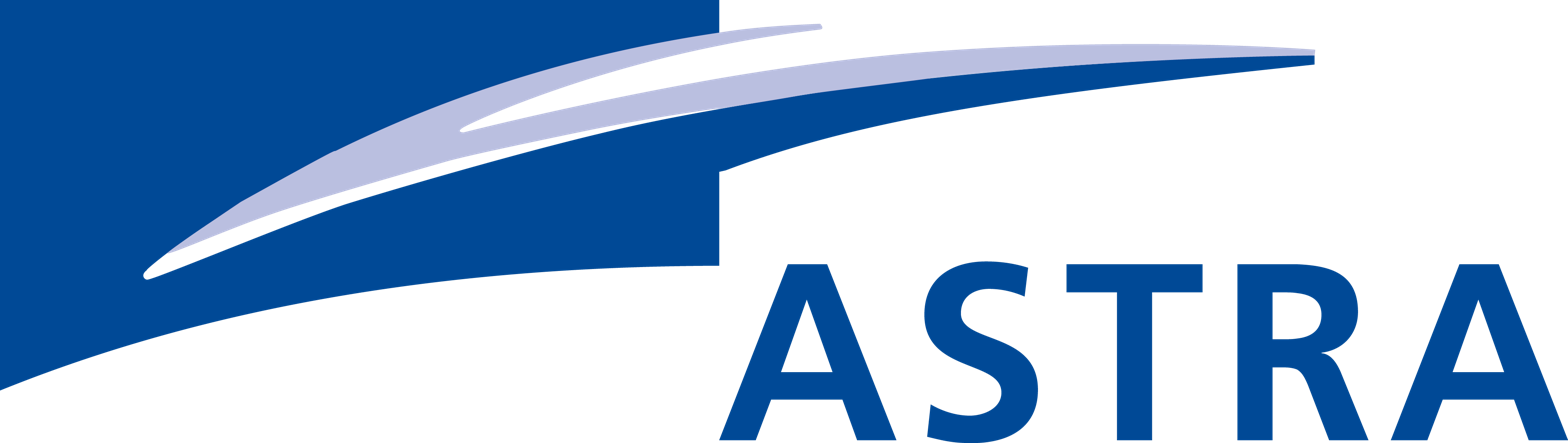

- Astra Tower in Sudirman Road
- Type: Public
- Traded as: IDX: ASII
- Industry: Conglomerate
- Founded: 20 February 1957; 69 years ago
- Founder: William Soeryadjaya; Tjia Kian Tie
- Headquarters: Menara Astra, Jakarta, Indonesia
- Key people: Rudy (President Director); Prijono Sugiarto (President Commissioner)
- Products: Automotive; Financial Services; Mining Solutions & Heavy Equipment; Wider Businesses
- Revenue: Rp157.913 Billion (H1 2026)
- Net income: Rp12,533 Billion (H1 2026)
- Total assets: Rp514.517 Billion (H1 2026)
- Total equity: Rp289.844 Billion (H1 2026)
- Owner: Jardine Cycle & Carriage (50.1%); Public (49.9%)
- Number of employees: 195,752 (March 2026)
- Website: www.astra.co.id

PT Astra International Tbk (IDX: ASII), commonly referred to as Astra, is an Indonesian conglomerate headquartered in Jakarta, Indonesia. It is one of the largest publicly listed companies on the Indonesia Stock Exchange and is majority-owned by Jardine Cycle & Carriage, itself a subsidiary of Jardine Matheson.

The company was established on 20 February 1957 under the name PT Astra International Incorporated. In 1990, the company changed its name to PT Astra International Tbk following its official listing on the Jakarta Stock Exchange on 4 April 1990. As of 2024, Astra comprises more than 300 subsidiaries, joint ventures, and associate companies, supported by more than 190,000 employees. Its consolidated net revenue for 2024 was Rp330.9 trillion, a 5% increase over 2023.

Astra's diversified business model spans nine industry sectors: automotive and mobility, financial services, heavy equipment, mining, construction and energy, agribusiness, infrastructure, information technology, and property.

== History ==
Astra was originally founded in the 1950s by Tjia Kian Liong (William Soeryadjaya), Tjia Kian Tie, and Liem Peng Hong (E. Hardiman). In its early years, the company operated from a shop at Jalan Sabang No. 36A (now Jalan Haji Agus Salim), Jakarta. The name "Astra" was proposed by Kian Tie, Kian Liong's younger brother, derived from the Latin word for "star." The three founders registered PT Astra International Inc. through notary Sie Khwan Djioe on 20 February 1957, with an initial capital of IDR2.5 million.

In its early years, the company operated as a distributor and importer of Prim Club corned beef and CIP brand soft drinks, in addition to local products from Bandung including toothpaste brands. Other business activities included the shipment of aluminium phosphate and light bulbs, and the export of copra and cooking oil. Over time, full ownership was transferred to Kian Liong alone.

During Indonesia's Guided Democracy period under President Sukarno, between 1962 and 1964, Astra served as a local supplier for the Jatiluhur Dam development project. In 1965, amid challenging economic conditions, Kian Liong relocated Astra's office from Jalan Sabang to Jalan Juanda III No. 8. In 1966, Astra became the importer of 80,000 tonnes of asphalt from Marubeni, Japan, to support road construction projects. The company also secured a US$2.9 million loan from USAID to finance truck imports from the United States. However, due to violation of aid conditions, Astra was subsequently barred from importing trucks from General Motors.

In 1969, Astra shifted its business focus toward Japan. Hideo Kamio, a former manager at Gaya Motor during the Japanese occupation era, strongly advocated that Toyota trucks entering Indonesia should be assembled at Gaya Motor, which was already under William's ownership. Through PT Gaya Motor, Astra subsequently became the sole distributor of Toyota in Indonesia, later forming PT Toyota-Astra Motor (TAM) as a joint venture with Toyota Motor Corporation in 1971. TAM introduced the first Toyota Kijang in 1977, one of Indonesia's pioneering family vehicle models.

Starting in 1970, Astra was gradually appointed as the distributor of various Japanese products, becoming the sole distributor of Honda motorcycles in Indonesia. To support local manufacturing, Astra established PT Federal Motor (now PT Astra Honda Motor) in 1971 as a Honda motorcycle assembly plant. Astra entered the heavy equipment business through the establishment of PT United Tractors in 1972, and in 1973 was appointed sole distributor of Daihatsu products in Indonesia, leading to the establishment of PT Astra Daihatsu Motor in 1978.

In 1988, following banking deregulation, William Soeryadjaya and his son Edward established Bank Summa after acquiring Bank Agung Asia in 1989. The bank subsequently collapsed due to bad credit, and William sold a substantial portion of his Astra shares to a consortium of prominent business figures to compensate depositors. Astra later established Bank Universal, which also collapsed during the 1997 Asian financial crisis.

In 1990, Astra conducted its initial public offering (IPO) of 30 million shares on the Jakarta Stock Exchange (now the Indonesia Stock Exchange).

In the aftermath of the 1997 Asian financial crisis and the fall of Suharto, a 40% block of Astra shares was transferred to the Indonesian Bank Restructuring Agency (BPPN), which subsequently auctioned them. Jardine Cycle & Carriage won the auction and currently holds 50.1% of Astra's shares.

In 2004, Astra, in partnership with Standard Chartered Bank, acquired Bank Permata, formed through the merger of five banks previously supervised by the Indonesian Bank Restructuring Agency. The combined ownership held by Astra and Standard Chartered Bank reached 89.12% from 2006 until 2020, when Standard Chartered completed its acquisition of Astra's stake.

In 2016, Astra entered the property sector as a new line of business. In 2019, Astra invested US$150 million in application-based on-demand service Gojek.

== Current business ==
=== Automotive and Mobility ===
- Toyota and Lexus, through PT Toyota-Astra Motor as the sole agent, importer, and distributor, a 50–50 joint venture with Toyota Motor Corporation. Astra also holds a 5% stake in PT Toyota Motor Manufacturing Indonesia, which operates five manufacturing facilities.
- Daihatsu, through PT Astra Daihatsu Motor, a joint venture between Astra International, Daihatsu, and Toyota Tsusho. The facility also manufactures certain Toyota-branded models.
- Isuzu, through PT Isuzu Astra Motor Indonesia, a joint venture between PT Arya Kharisma (fully owned by Astra International) and Isuzu, as the sole agent and manufacturer of vehicles, components, accessories, and spare parts.
- UD Trucks, through UD Astra Motor Indonesia as the sole agent.
- BMW and Mini, as assembler and distributor.
- Honda motorcycles, through PT Astra Honda Motor, a 50–50 joint venture with Honda for the manufacturing and distribution of Honda motorcycles for the Indonesian market and export.
- PT Astra Otoparts Tbk, a publicly listed automotive components manufacturer and distributor.

=== Financial Services ===
- PT Federal International Finance
- PT Asuransi Jiwa Astra
- PT Astra Sedaya Finance
- PT Asuransi Astra Buana
- PT Bank Saqu Indonesia
- PT Komatsu Astra Finance
- PT Surya Artha Nusantara Finance

=== Heavy Equipment, Mining, Construction and Energy ===
- PT United Tractors Tbk

=== Agribusiness ===
- PT Astra Agro Lestari Tbk

=== Infrastructure ===
- PT Astra Tol Nusantara

=== Information Technology ===
- PT Astra Graphia Tbk, handling distribution of Fuji Xerox products.

=== Property ===
- PT Menara Astra (Astra Property)
- PT Astra Land Indonesia, in partnership with Hongkong Land
- PT Brahmayasa Bahtera
- PT Samadista Karya
