= Jualo.com =

PT Jualo
- Website type: E-Classifieds and E-Marketplace
- Available in: Bahasa Indonesia
- Headquarters: Jakarta, Indonesia
- Founder: Chaim Fetter
- CEO: Manisha Seewal
- Website: https://www.jualo.com/
- Commercial: Yes
- Launched: January, 2014
- Current status: Active

Jualo.com is online marketplace in Indonesian e-classifieds website which allows users to obtain or provide goods and services. Payment is processed through an escrow system.

== History ==
Jualo.com was founded by Chaim Fetter in 2014. At that time, he had only 15 staff members, including web developers. It offers escrow payments, geo-search, and home delivery 3PL integrations.

In early 2016, the company had millions of monthly visitors and hundreds of thousands of new monthly products and public listings. The company attracted Series A investment from NSI Ventures (based in Singapore) and Susquehanna International Group. Incumbent investors include Indonesia-based VCs Alpha JWC Ventures and Mountain Kejora.

In April 2017, João Pedro Principe, who had joined Jualo.com in June 2016, took over as CEO.

Jualo.com holds a close relationship with the non-profit organization Yayasan Peduli Anak (YPA) since the two share a founder. Jualo.com provides operational support in Jakarta to YPA, which operates primarily in Lombok and Sumbawa.

In 2018, Jualo.com had 4 million monthly active users and facilitated transactions worth $1 billion. The same year the company was acquired by Carro.

In March 2020, Manisha Seewal became the CEO of Jualo.com.
