= Jardine Strategic Holdings =

Jardine Strategic Holdings Limited (BSX: JSHBD.BH, LSE: JDS, SGX: J37 ) is an investment holding company. It is a subsidiary of Jardine Matheson.

The company holds substantial interests in Dairy Farm, a pan-Asian retail group, Hongkong Land, a property group, Mandarin Oriental, a hotel chain, and Jardine Cycle & Carriage, a Singapore-listed diversified group. It also owns a significant shareholding in Jardine Matheson Holdings Limited, its own corporate parent, providing an element of control to the Keswick family. This expertise in protecting family owners was shared in 2005 when it took a 20% stake in Rothschild Continuation Holdings, a major merchant bank.

== Jardine Strategic Holding % in Jardine's ==
- HongKong Land - 50%
- Dairy Farm - 78%
- Mandarin Oriental - 79%
- Jardine Cycle & Carriage - 75%
