= Daniel Beale =

Scottish merchant and fur trader (1759–1842)

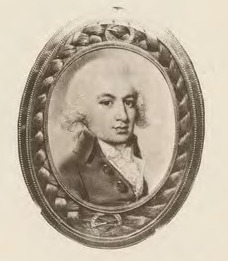
- portrait by George Engleheart
- Died: 1842

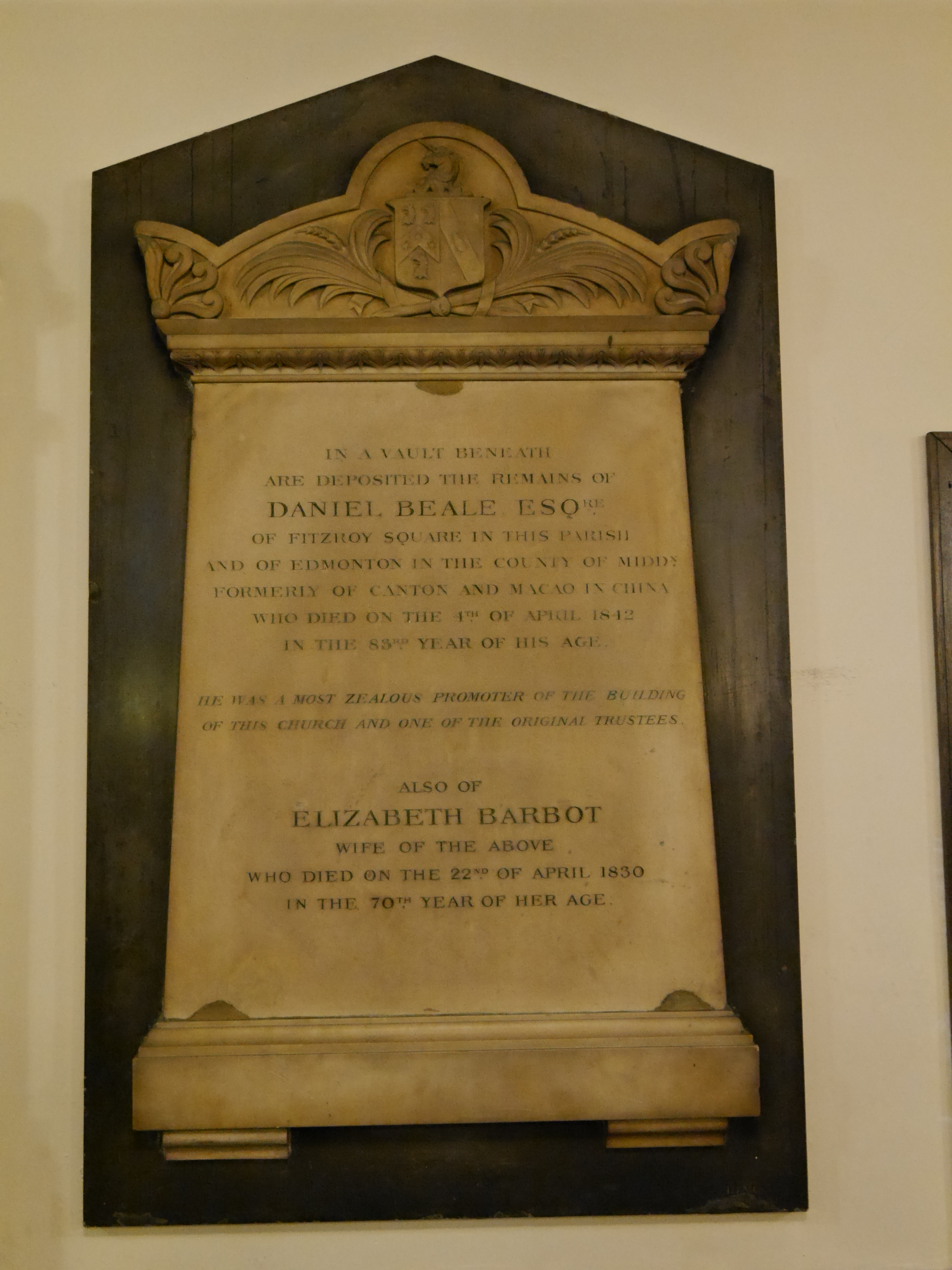
Daniel Beale and Elizabeth Barbot memorial, St Pancras New Church, London

Daniel Beale (1759–1842) was a Scottish merchant and fur trader active in the Asian mercantile centres of Bombay, Canton and Macau as well as at one time the Prussian consul in China.

== Biography ==
Daniel Beale was the purser of, successively, the East India Company ships Walpole and General Coote on voyages between London and Canton in 1783-1786: in 1783 he joined the Macao partnership of John Henry Cox and John Reid in their mercantile ventures. Giving evidence before the British parliament's commons committee of Enquiry on the East India Company’s Affairs on 11 May 1815, Beale testified that he had been resident in Canton "from the latter end of 1787 to the middle of 1797" and acted as "agent for many of the mercantile houses in Bombay and Bengal."

John Henry Cox had been sent to Canton in 1782 by his father James to sell off an accumulated stock of clocks, watches and mechanical toys known in Pidgin English as "singsongs", which were popular with the Chinese. Along with James Fox, the other major manufacturer of singsongs was Francis Magniac of Clerkenwell, London, whose sons Charles and Hollingworth would later become partners of Beale.

Merchants operating in the Far East at this time formed a bewildering array of partnerships. As well as the Coxes, Beale was also at various times a partner of John Reid, Charles Magniac and his brother Hollingworth, as well as Alexander Shank and Robert Hamilton.

On 15 February 1786, a Prussian ship arrived at Whampoa whereupon the East India Company's agent at Canton informed the Committee of Supercargoes that Beale had shown him a letter signed by "Count Lusi, Envoy Extraordinaire to his Majesty the King of Prussia with the King of Great Britain and his Colonel of Infantry", announcing his appointment as his Prussian Majesty's Consul in China.

Beale was also a member of the Associated Merchants Trading to the Northwest Coast of America, which owned the snow Iphigenia Nubiana, trading on this coast in 1788 and 1789. Other partners in the venture were John Meares, John Henry Cox, Richard C. Etches, John W. Etches, William Fitzhugh and Henry Land. Along with fellow Scotsman John Reid, Beale was also one of the owners of the Imperial Eagle, a vessel ostensibly belonging to the fictitious Austrian East India Company, which sailed under the flag of Austria. This allowed her to circumvent the trade monopoly then held by the East India Company. Beale was by this time the Prussian agent in Canton following his earlier appointment as consul. Beale organized the voyage of the Imperial Eagle when he returned to London from Canton on the HCS General Coote in August 1786.

By 1797, Beale & Co. had become the biggest of the country traders, dealing with clients in Bombay, Calcutta and London, in Indian cotton, sandalwood, tin, pepper Chinese tea and silk as well as opium. His firm Beale & Co. seems to have been active in the opium trade between 1783–1793.

In 1797 Daniel Beale left China to join Magniac & Co. in London and in 1800 the sole British firm in Canton is recorded as Reid, Beale & Co., formerly Hamilton & Reid, and in 1804 to become Beale & Magniac.

== Memorial ==
Beale died in England in 1842. In the gallery of St Pancras New Church, London, there is a memorial to Thomas Beale of Fitzroy Square and of Millfield House Edmonton, Middlesex. formerly of Canton and Macao, "a most zealous promoter of the building of this Church and one of the original trustees."

He was painted by Jacques-Laurent Agasse in his painting Daniel Beale at his Farm at Edmonton with his Favourite Horse.

== Family ==
He is related to Susanna Preston Beale (1806-1843) who married Charles Gonne, Lisbon wine merchant, and was Maud Gonnes grandmother, and a cousin, Thomas Chaye Beale.
