= Hollingworth Magniac =

British businessman (1786–1867)

Hollingworth Magniac (1786–1867) was a merchant and connoisseur of medieval art. He briefly ran the free trading firm of Magniac & Co. which was later to become Jardine, Matheson & Co., one of the largest trading houses in Asia during the 19th century.

== Biography ==
Magniac was born on 15 April 1786 in Colworth House, Bedfordshire, the son of Colonel Francis Magniac (1751-1823) and Frances Attwood. His father was a French Huguenot (tracing back only to Charles Lewis Magniac b. 1725-??) goldsmith who exported clocks and watches to China. In order to keep an eye on his business interests there, he dispatched his son Charles to Canton where he went into partnership with Daniel Beale, an experienced China merchant, forming Beale, Magniac & Co. sometime before 1814.

Before the removal of the East India Company's monopoly on British trade with India and the Far East in 1834, the Scots-born seaman John Reid, a partner in Cox & Beale, discovered a way to circumvent the East India Company's jurisdiction. He took out Austrian citizenship and gained an appointment as Chinese Consul from the Emperor of Austria. As he now had diplomatic residence rights he no longer needed a licence to trade in Canton from the East India Company. Other partners in the firm quickly followed this example. In Hollingworth's case, he became Prussian Vice-Consul under his brother Charles, who was senior to him in the partnership. Charles was killed in Paris in 1824 during a trip to Europe.

Becoming Magniac & Co. after the retirement of Thomas Beale in 1814, the firm under Charles grew into one of the largest and most prominent of all the China trading houses. After Charles' death in 1824, the firm was taken over by his brother Daniel who was subsequently forced to resign after he married his Chinese mistress and brought the family into disrepute. That left Hollingworth in charge but the firm was in disarray. Wishing to leave Asia, Hollingworth went in search of competent partners to join his firm. Previously, Scottish merchant William Jardine had helped Daniel Magniac by sending his young son Daniel Francis, his child by his Chinese wife, to Scotland for schooling. After an extensive search for a senior partner, Hollingworth settled on Jardine, whose business reputation was already well known throughout Asia. Magniac and Jardine also invited James Matheson to join the firm. Magniac returned to England in 1828 with the firm in the hands of two of the most talented traders in Asia. Contrary to the practice at the time of retiring partners removing their capital from the firm, Hollingworth left his capital in trust to Jardine and Matheson. The firm remained as Magniac and Co. until 1832, as the name was still formidable throughout China and India. The partnership was then restructured to become Jardine, Matheson & Co. which would go on to become the largest trading company in Asia and later a Fortune 500 listed company.

Magniac married Helen Sampson, daughter of Peter Sampson, in 1827. After his return to England, in 1835 Magniac became a partner in the merchant banking firm of Magniac, Smith & Co. along with partners John Abel Smith and Oswald Smith at 3 Lombard Street, London. Jardine agreed to make them agents for Jardine, Matheson & Co. with the proviso "At no time shall it be expedient that we should give up the option of carrying on transactions with other London houses". In 1841 the bank was renamed Magniac, Jardine & Co. when William Jardine became a partner on his return to England.

=== Death ===
Magniac died on 31 March 1867 at age 80 in London, England. He is buried in the Magniac mausoleum in Sharnbrook, Bedfordshire. There is a memorial to Magniac and his wife in the local church.

== Medieval art collection ==
Magniac's collection of medieval art included Christ Crowned with Thorns by Hieronymus Bosch, now in the National Gallery in London. He also owned a fake "15th-century" Swiss or German coffer now in the Victoria and Albert Museum as well as the Reliquary from the Shrine of St. Oda which later passed to his son Charles.

== Issue ==
- Charles Magniac, Member of Parliament for St. Ives 1868-74 and for Bedford 1880-85
- Fanny Eliza Magniac (c 1827–5 May 1903)
