= Segambut Utara Komuter station =

Train station in Kuala Lumpur, Malaysia

Segambut Utara

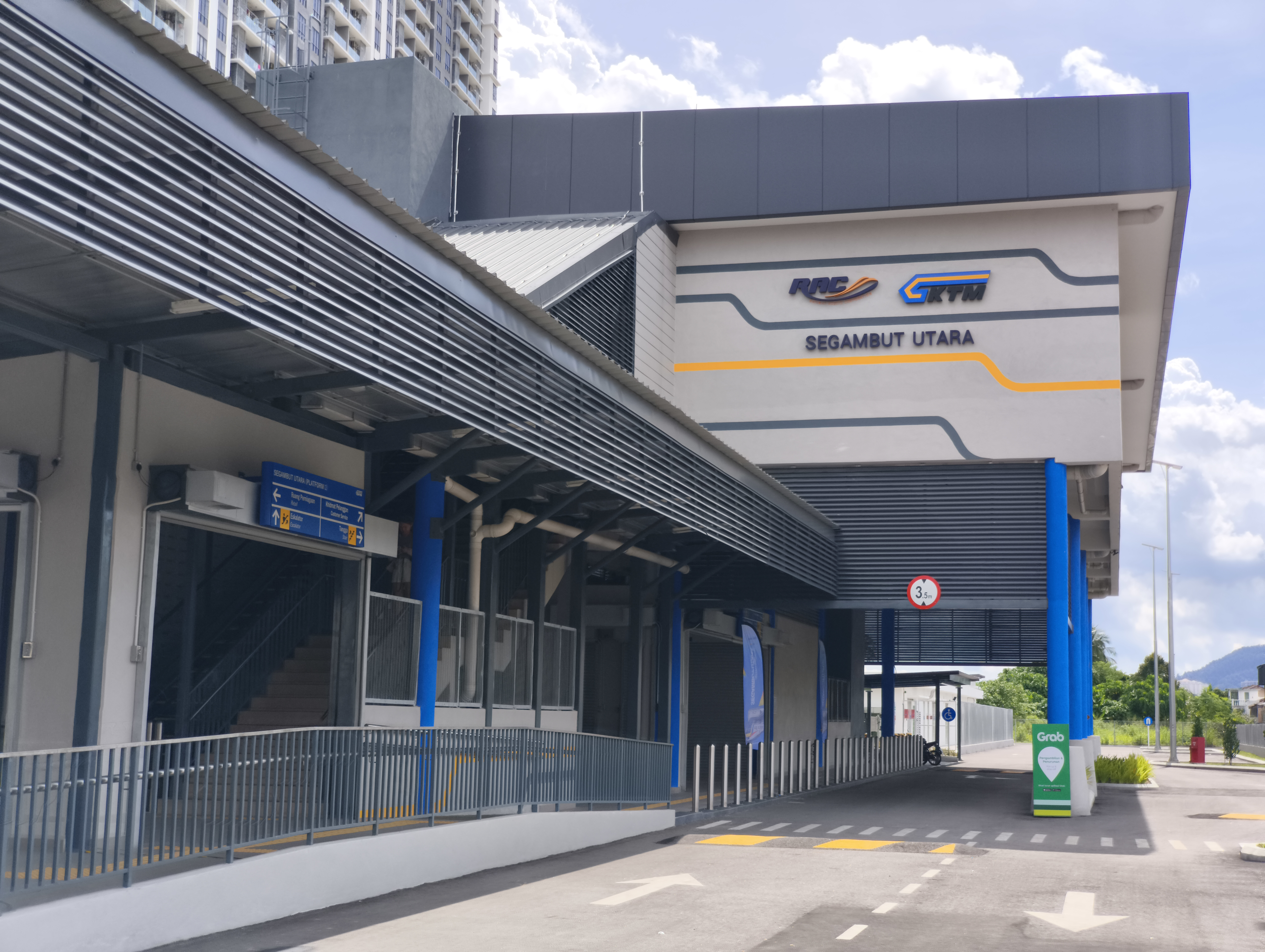
- Segambut Utara station entrance from Taman Sri Segambut

General information
- Other names: Malay: سݢامبوت اوتارا (Jawi); Chinese: 泗岩沫北; Tamil: சிகாம்புட் உத்தாரா
- Location: Segambut, Kuala Lumpur, Malaysia.
- Coordinates: 3.19200°N 101.65507°E
- System: KA05A | Commuter rail station
- Owner: Railway Assets Corporation, Keretapi Tanah Melayu Berhad
- Line: West Coast Line
- Platforms: 2 side platforms
- Tracks: 2
- Connections: Pedestrian link bridge to United Point Mall from Platform 2

Construction
- Structure type: Surface
- Parking: Available

Other information
- Status: In operation
- Station code: KA05A

History
- Opened: 11 May 2026; 3 months ago

Services
Preceding station	Keretapi Tanah Melayu (Komuter)	Following station
Kepong towards Tanjung Malim	Tanjung Malim–Port Klang Line	Segambut towards Port Klang
Location

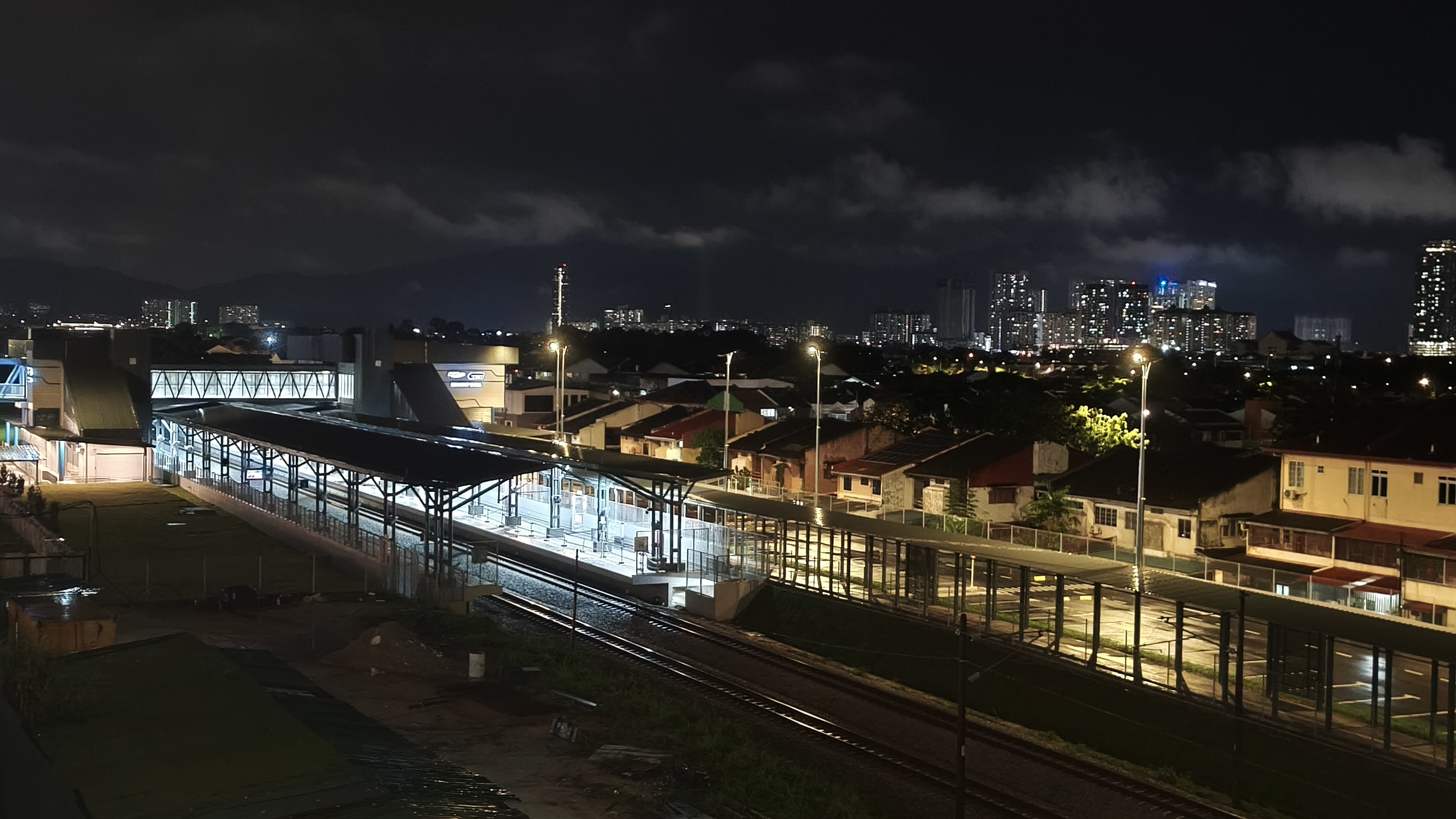
An elevated night view showing the illuminated station platforms and the surrounding residential landscape of Segambut.

The Segambut Utara Komuter Station (formerly Segambut 2) is an infill commuter train station serving the suburbs of Segambut and Jinjang Selatan in Kuala Lumpur, Malaysia. It is the 58th station to be part of the KTM network. It is served by the Tanjung Malim–Port Klang Line of the KTM Komuter service, which forms part of the Klang Valley Integrated Transit System. The station includes facilities such as park and ride, disabled-friendly utilities, ticket kiosks, restrooms, elevators, and taxi stands.

== History ==
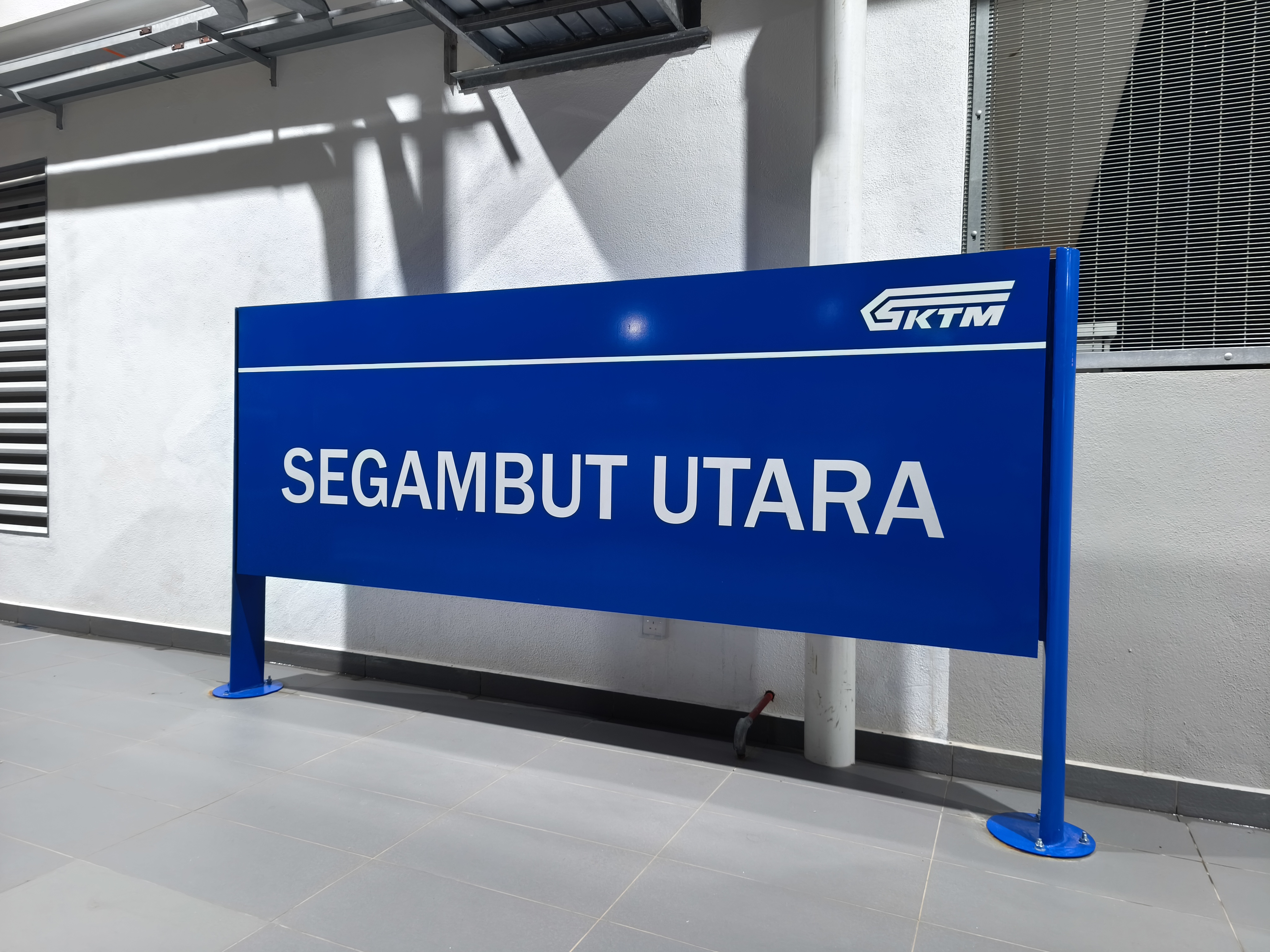
Signboard of Segambut Utara station

The land for the station was first earmarked in 2016 to be constructed as a KTM station alongside the development of UOA Development Berhad's United Point Residence.

In August 2023, the Railway Assets Corporation (RAC) and IDP Industrial Development Sdn Bhd signed an agreement with UOA Development Berhad to develop the new railway station along the KTM line, with UOA undertaking the construction to further integrate it with its existing development. The signing ceremony was witnessed by Transport Minister Anthony Loke and Segambut MP Hannah Yeoh.

Construction of the station was initially expected to be completed by November 2025. The station connects directly to United Point via an overhead bridge and serves the surrounding neighborhoods of Taman Cuepacs, Taman Sri Segambut, Taman Segambut Aman, and Taman Sri Sinar.

On May 9, 2026, KTMB announced that the Segambut Utara KTM Station would officially begin operations on May 11, 2026. As part of the Tanjung Malim–Pelabuhan Klang route, the station links passengers to major destinations and rail integration hubs, including Sungai Buloh, Kepong Sentral, Abdullah Hukum, and Subang Jaya, facilitating seamless connections to the MRT and LRT networks. Passengers are also able to continue journeys to the Batu Caves–Pulau Sebang sector through interchange stations such as Kuala Lumpur and KL Sentral.

The station is expected to benefit more than 250,000 residents in Segambut, Jalan Ipoh, Kepong, and nearby areas by improving daily mobility in these densely populated neighborhoods. Furthermore, KTMB emphasized that the station's opening supports efforts to reduce reliance on private vehicles and strengthens sustainable urban mobility throughout the Klang Valley.

== Gallery ==
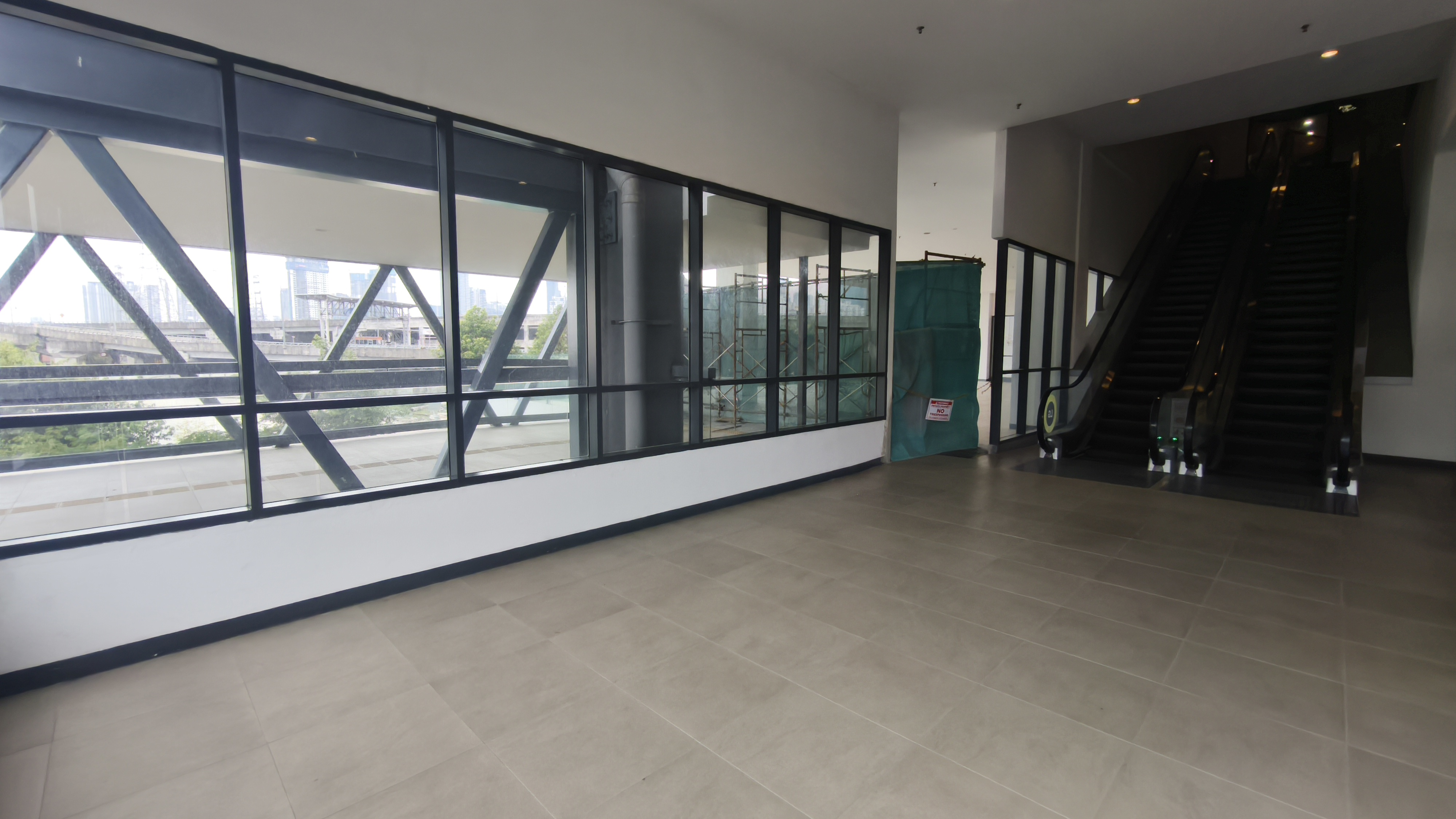
The pedestrian link escalator viewed from United Point Mall.

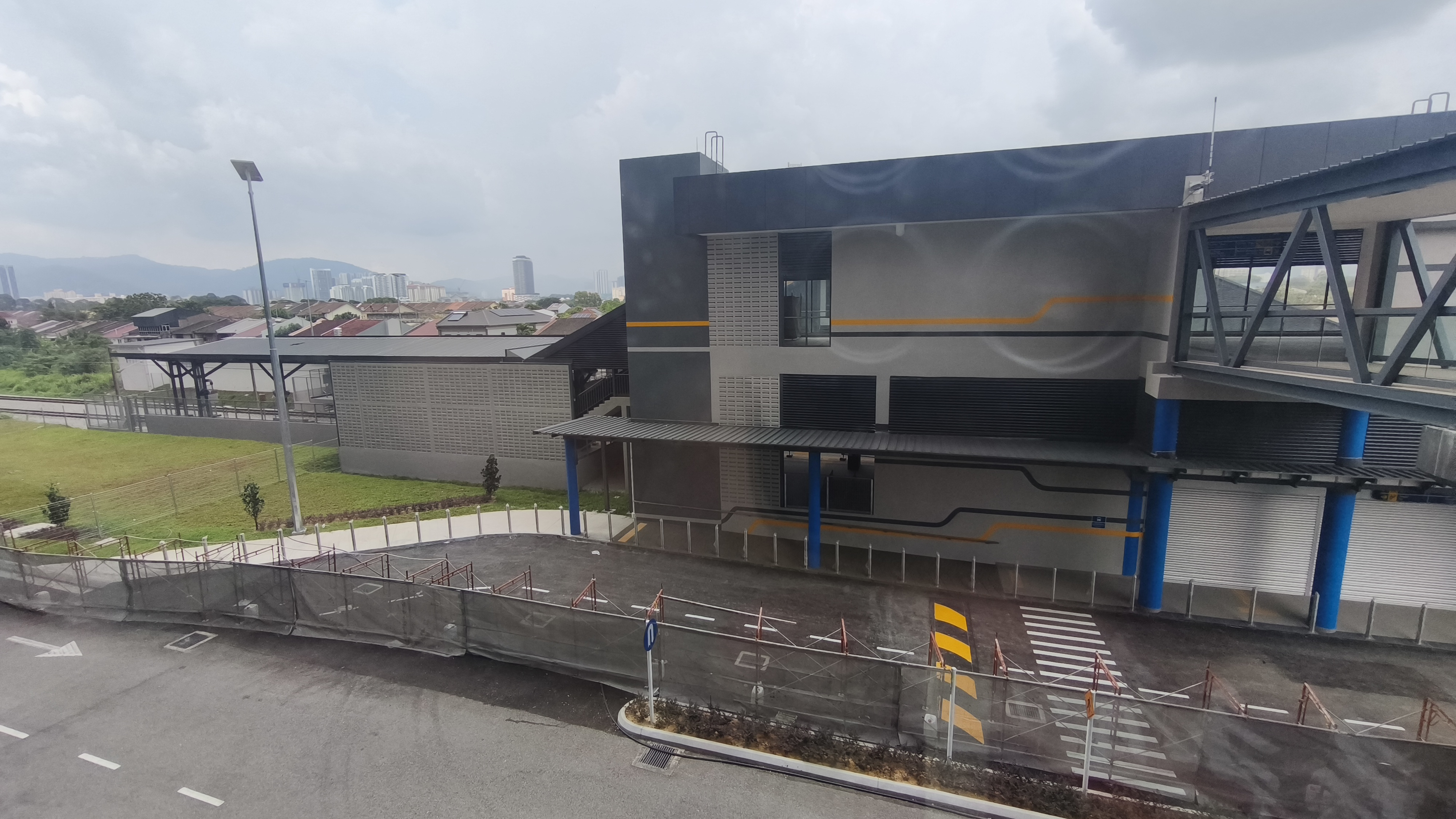
Daytime exterior view of the station building and entrance area.

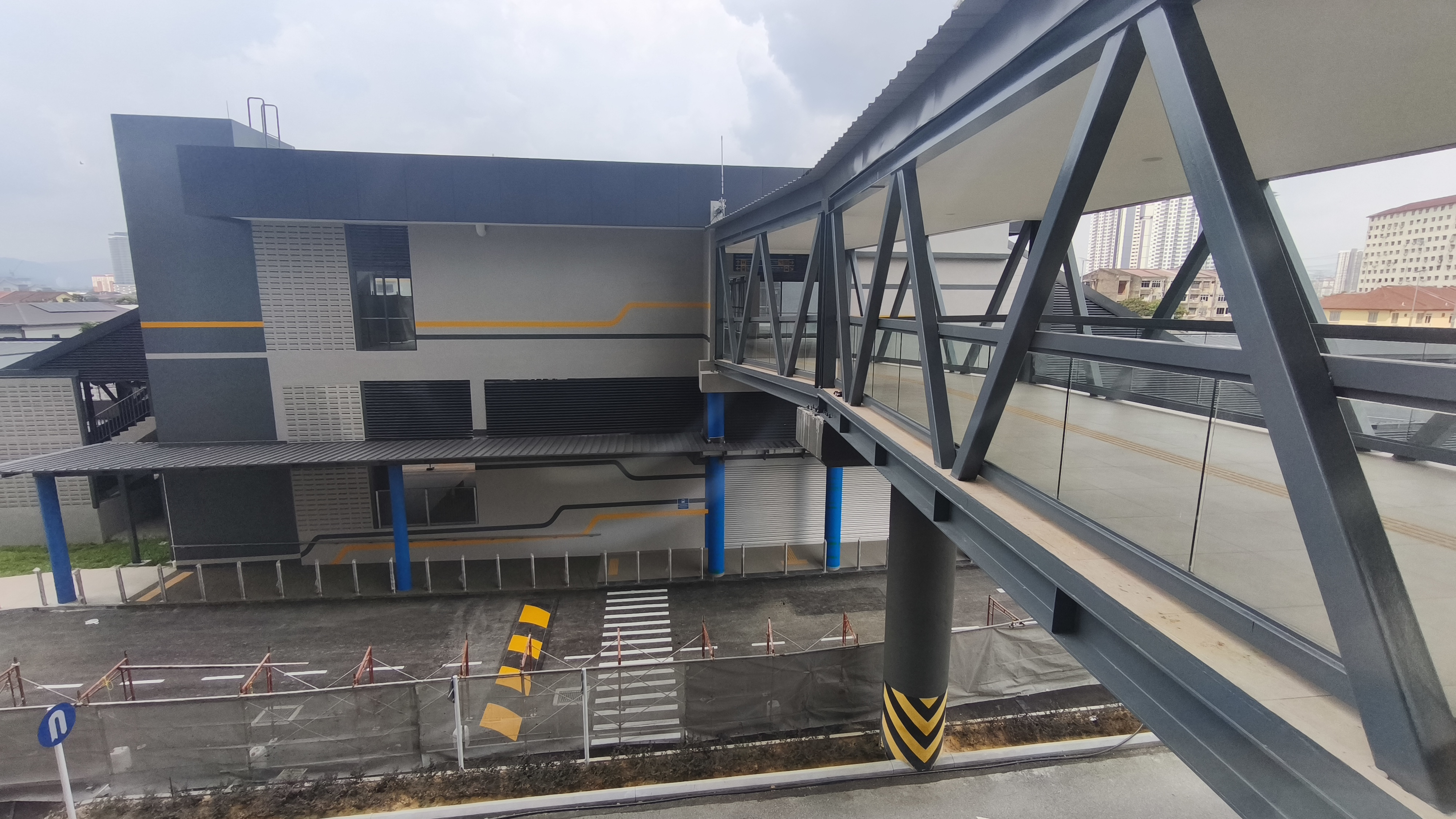
Wide-angle view of the station site looking from the pedestrian link.

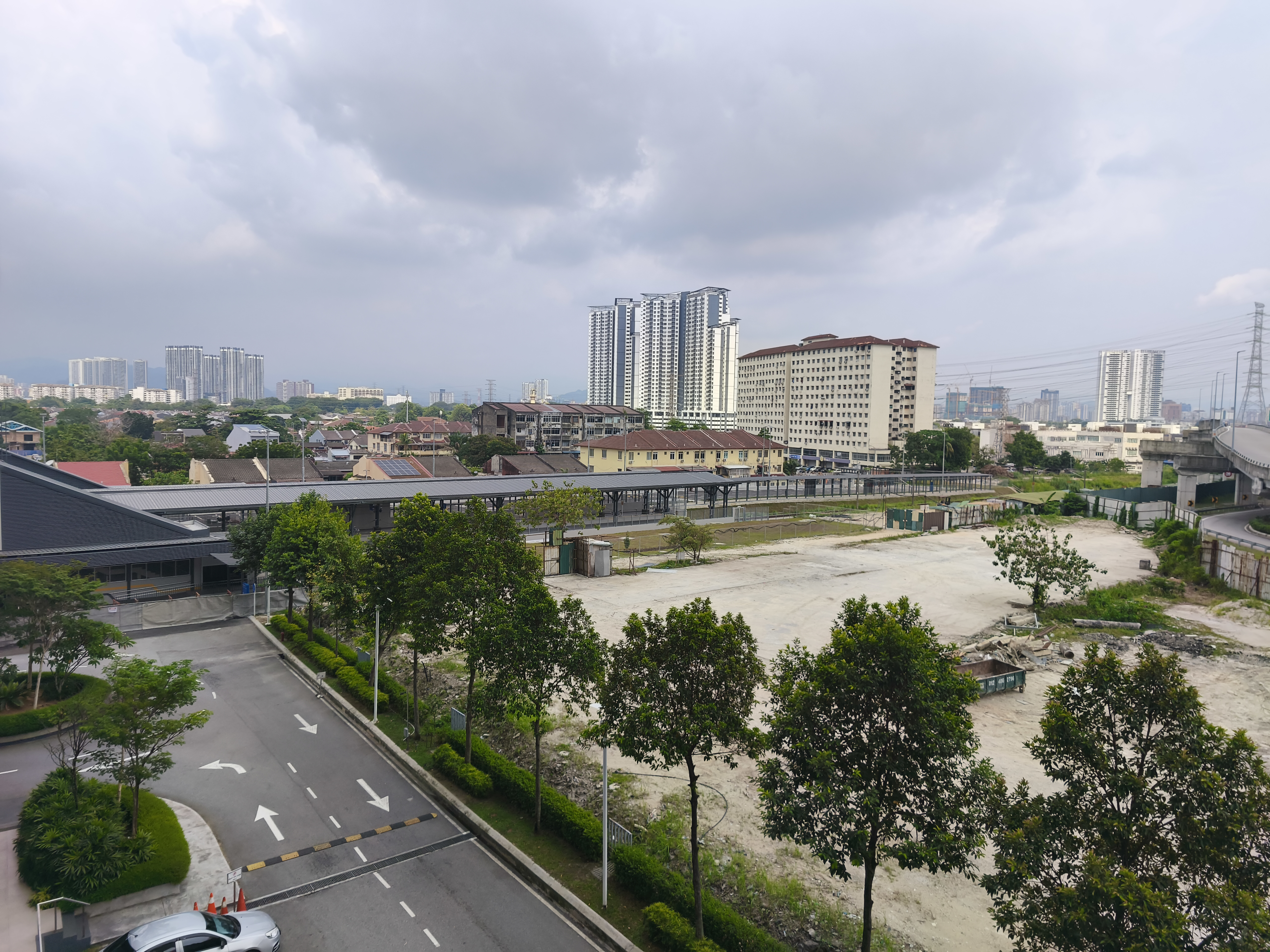
Station view from United Point.

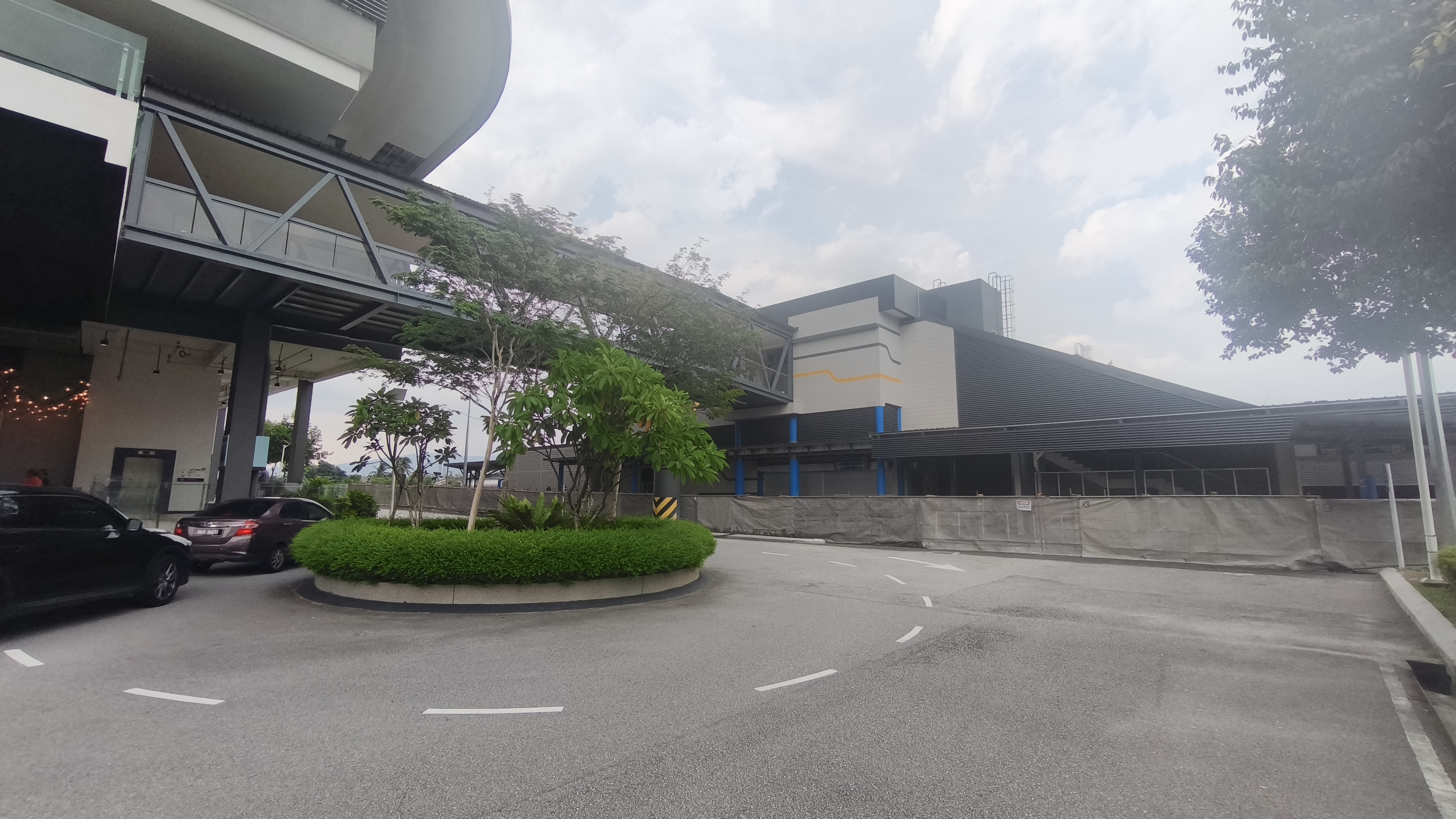
Station facade and passenger drop-off point during the day.

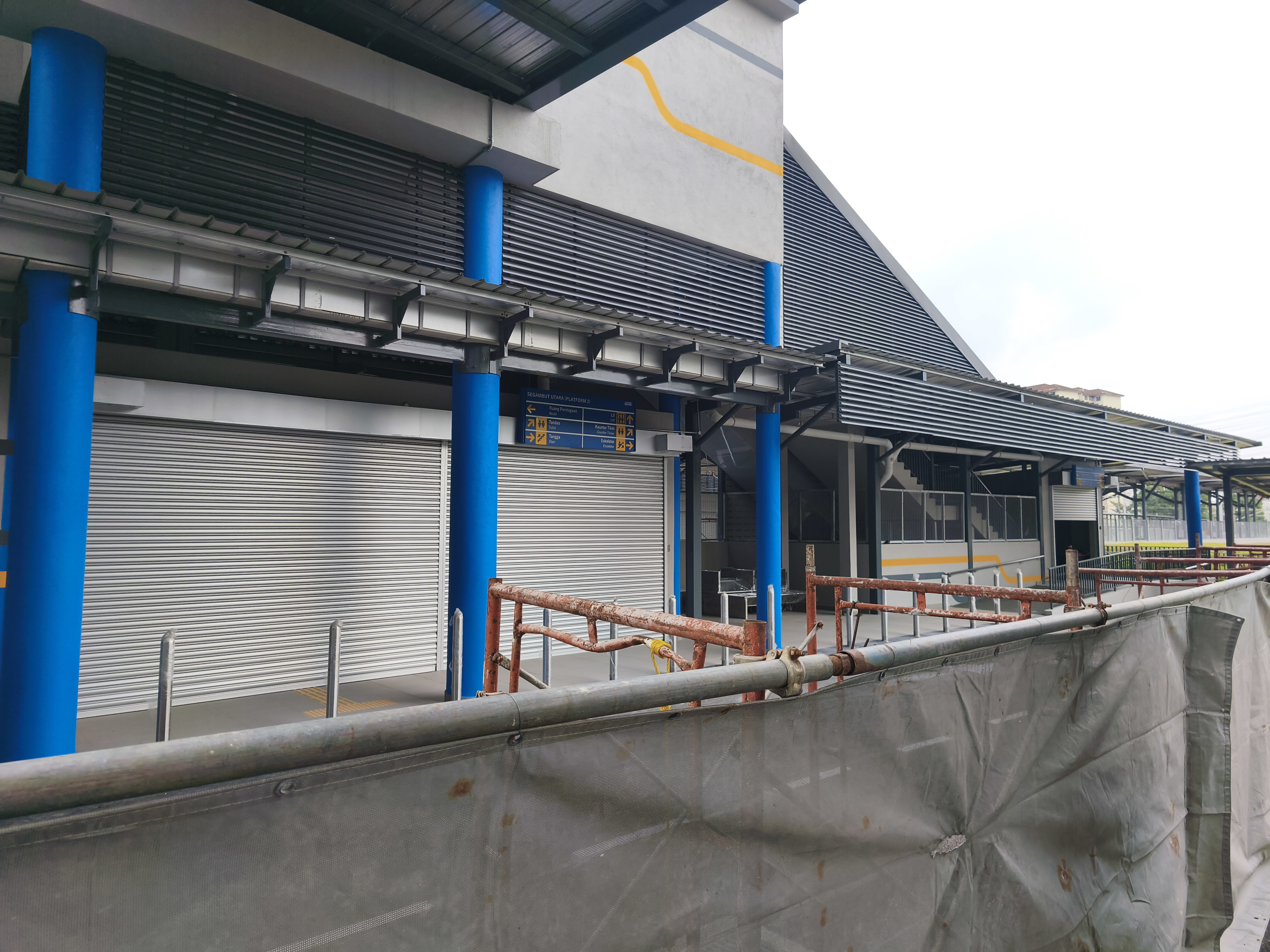
Detailed view of the station structure and surrounding fencing.

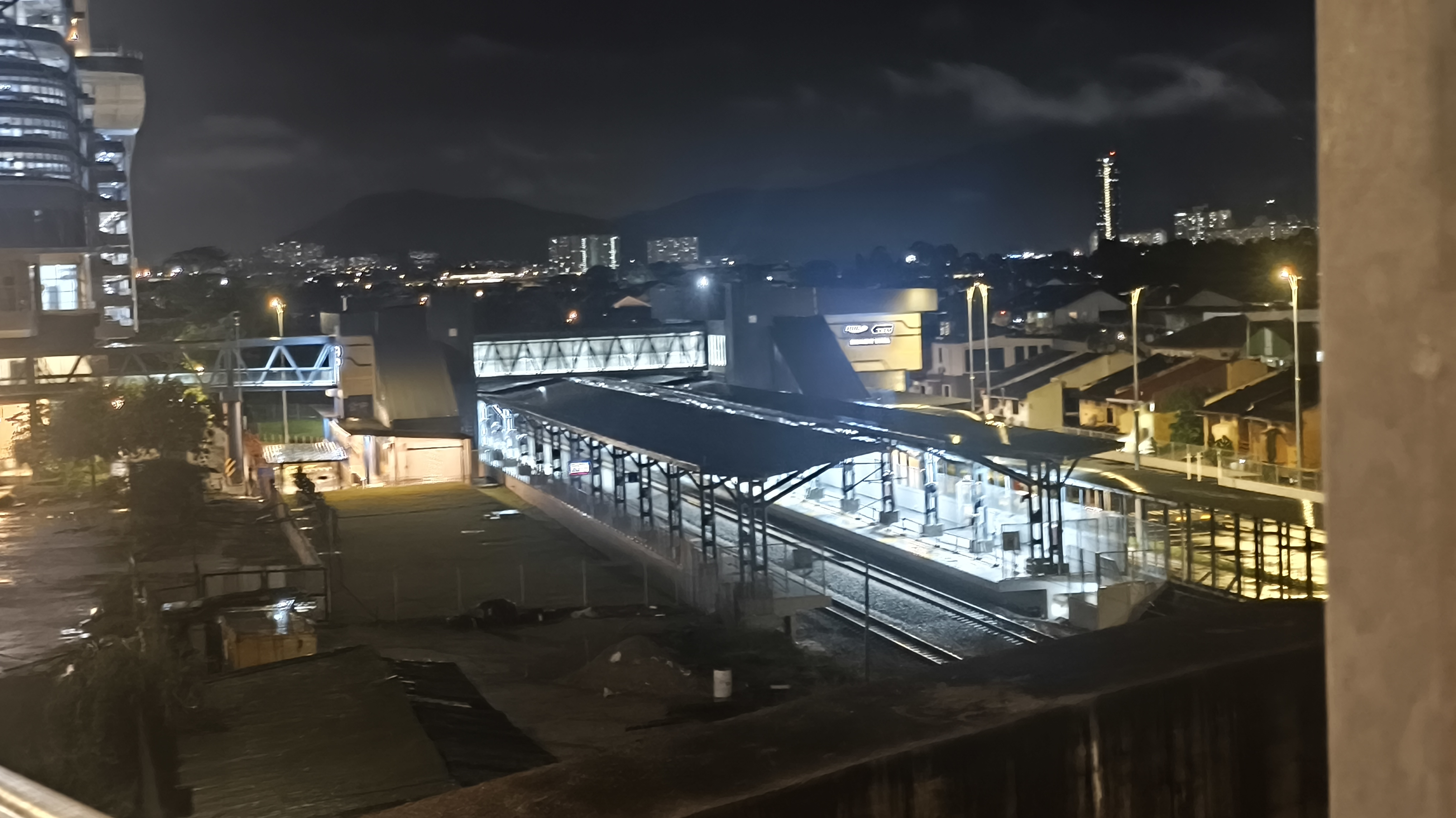
The station entrance illuminated at night.

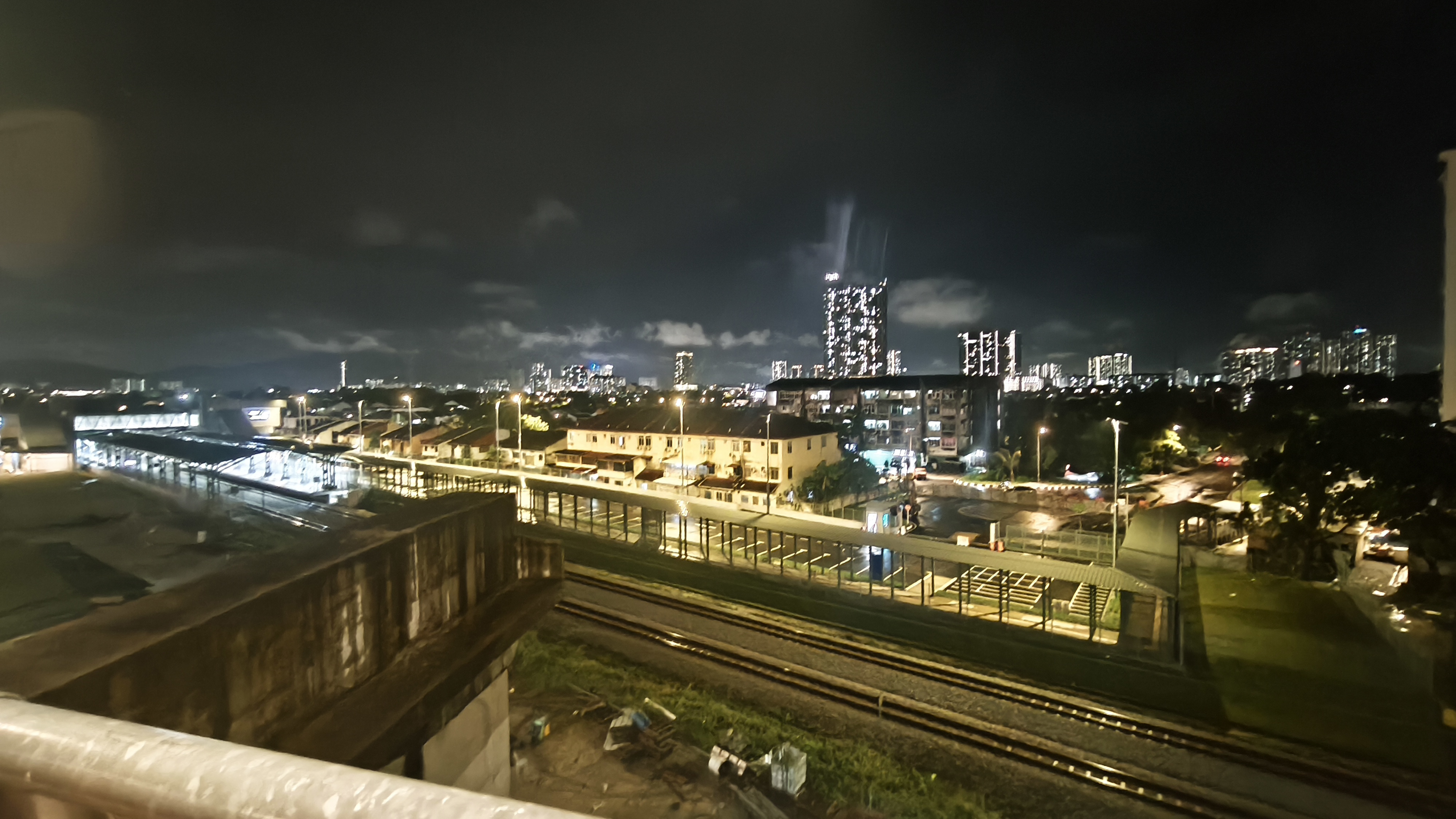
Night view of the station linkway and facade.

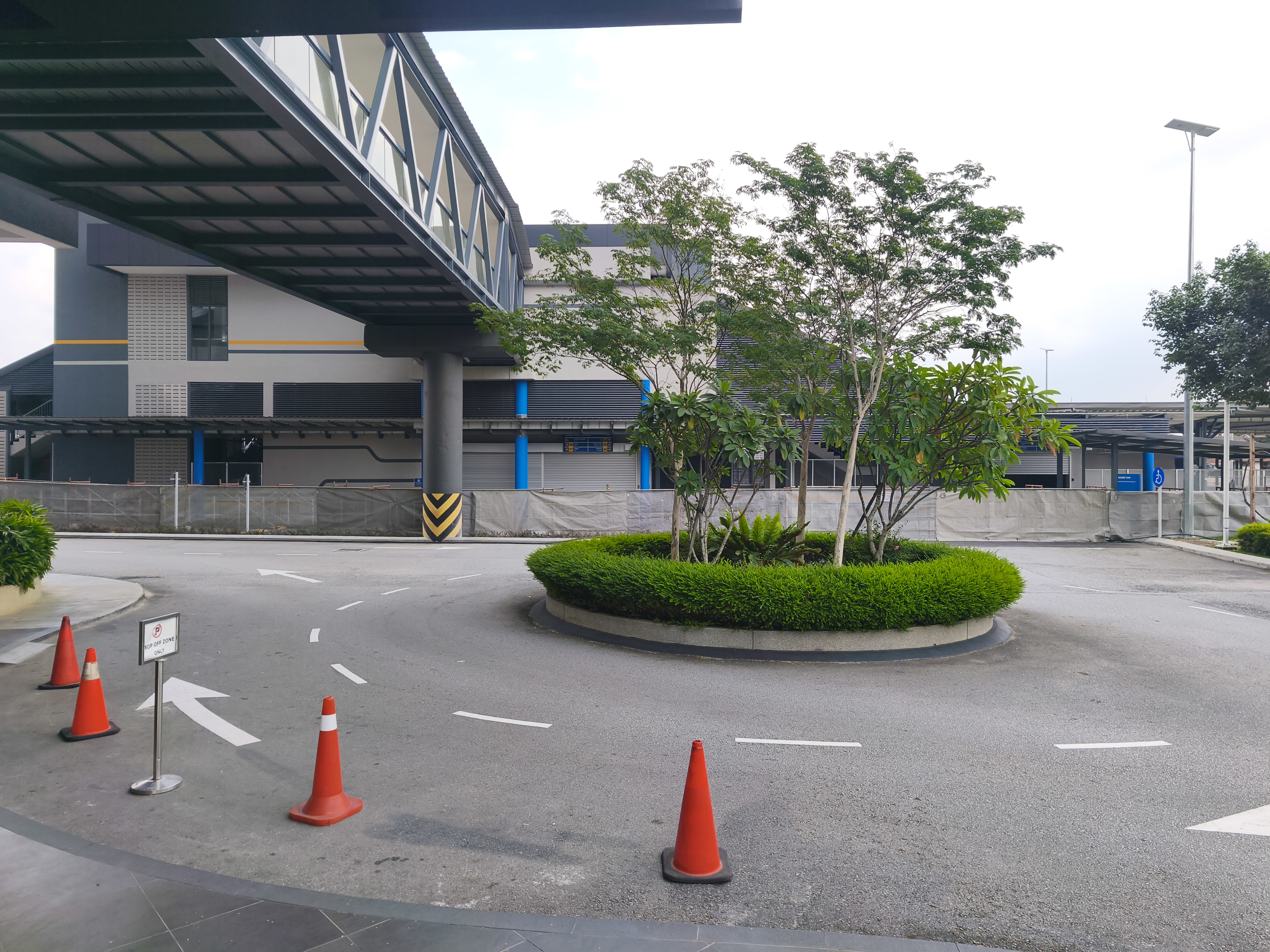
The entrance specifically leading to Platform 2 for southbound services.
