= UoA =

UOA or UoA may refer to:

- National and Kapodistrian University of Athens, Greece
- Unit of Application, a geographic area for Medical Training Application Service
- University of Aberdeen, Scotland
- University of Abertay, Scotland
- University of Adelaide, Australia
- University of Alberta, Canada
- University of Asmara, Eritrea
- University of Auckland, New Zealand
- UOA Group, a company in Malaysia
- Used Oil analysis, a laboratory analysis of a lubricant's properties, suspended contaminants, and wear debris, performed during routine predictive maintenance to provide meaningful and accurate information on lubricant and machine condition.
