= Bangsar South =

Suburb in Kuala Lumpur

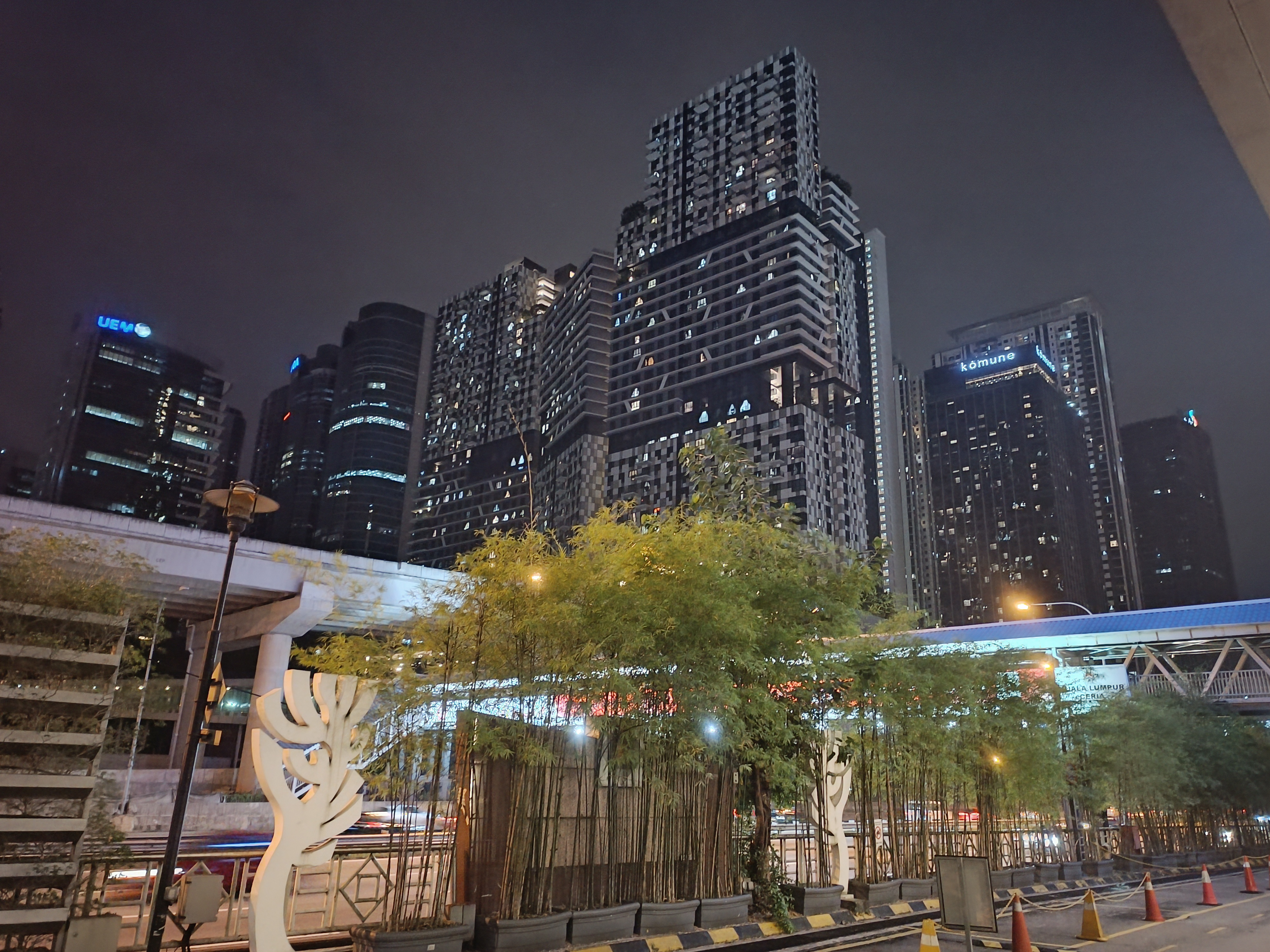
- Bangsar South at night
- Interactive map of Bangsar South
- Location: Kuala Lumpur, Malaysia
- Coordinates: 3.1106019°N 101.6662729°E

Companies
- Developer: UOA Group

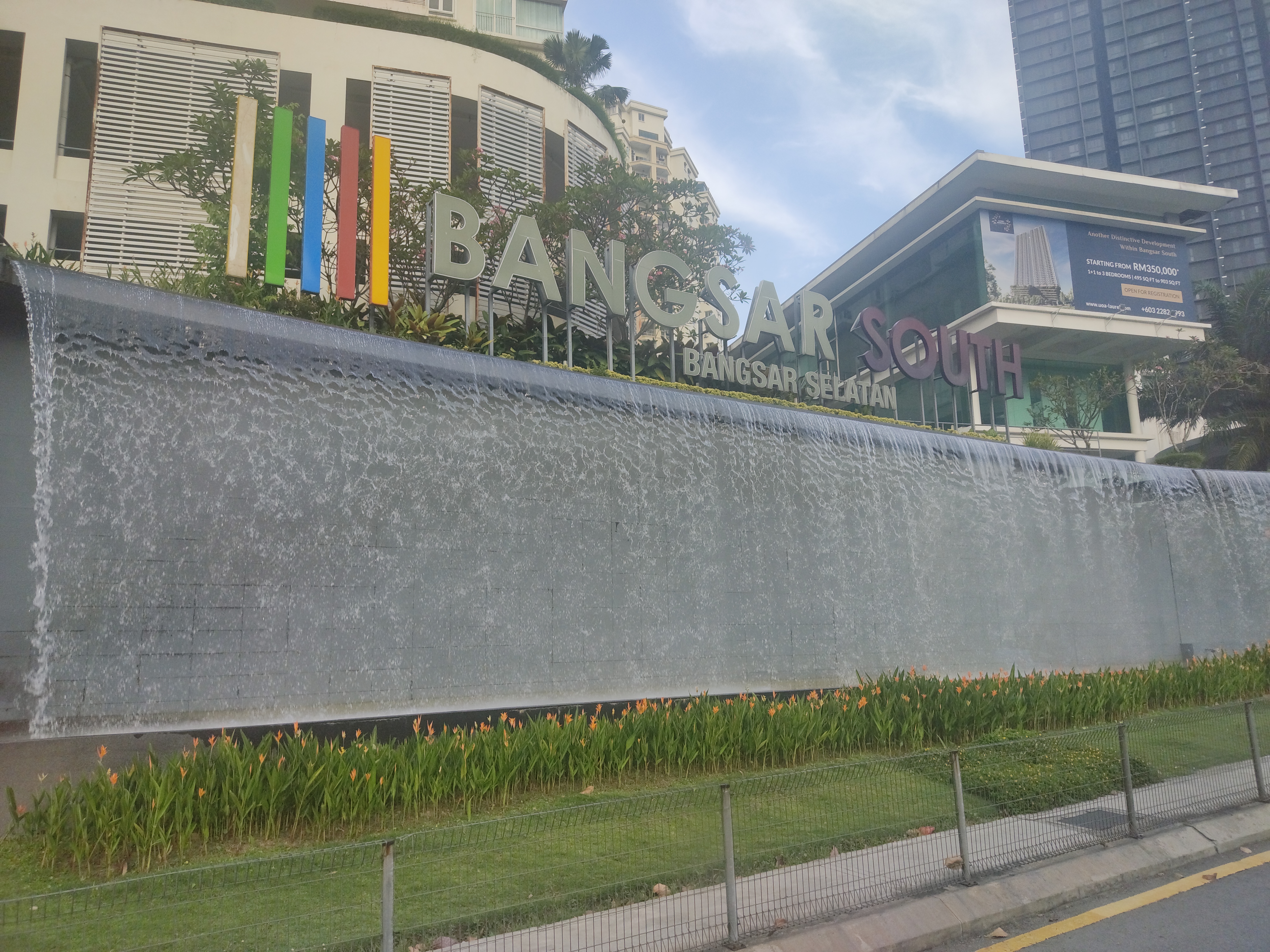
Bangsar South's signage along Jalan Kerinchi

Kampung Kerinchi (also known as Bangsar South) (Malay: Bangsar Selatan) is an integrated property development project which sits on the former Kampung Kerinchi site in Kuala Lumpur, Malaysia. It is renamed of Kampung Kerinchi from the developer to upscale the value of land. The 60-acre (240,000 m^{2}) development was undertaken by UOA Group, which acquired the land once known as south of Bangsar back in 2005. The site is located near Menara Telekom and the Mid Valley Megamall. Other notable landmarks in the vicinity are the Angkasapuri building and the University of Malaya. Existing residential projects in the immediate vicinity consist of affordable apartments and flats such as Vista Angkasa apartments, Kampung Kerinchi and Sri Angkasa flats. The Kampung Kerinchi project features several modern office towers, mid to high-end condominiums, as well as retail and commercial spaces.

In 2007, prior to construction, the developer carried out upgrading and landscaping works in Kampung Kerinchi, including the widening of the main access road and new pedestrian walkways, in attempts to rejuvenate and enhance the area dubbed as "unattractive".

This area uses the name Bangsar South which houses mixed and commercial development, while part of the area's original name was officially restored in 2019 where MP Fahmi Fadzil (who represents the Lembah Pantai Parliament) with DBKL in the process of restoring the original name.

== Healthcare ==
The LifeCare Diagnostic Medical Centre was opened in mid-2012. The University Malaya Medical Centre is nearby.

== Public transportation ==
Bangsar South - Kerinchi LRT Station linkbridge

The development is connected to the Kerinchi LRT station via a pedestrian bridge, and the Universiti LRT station on the Kelana Jaya line.

== Shopping ==
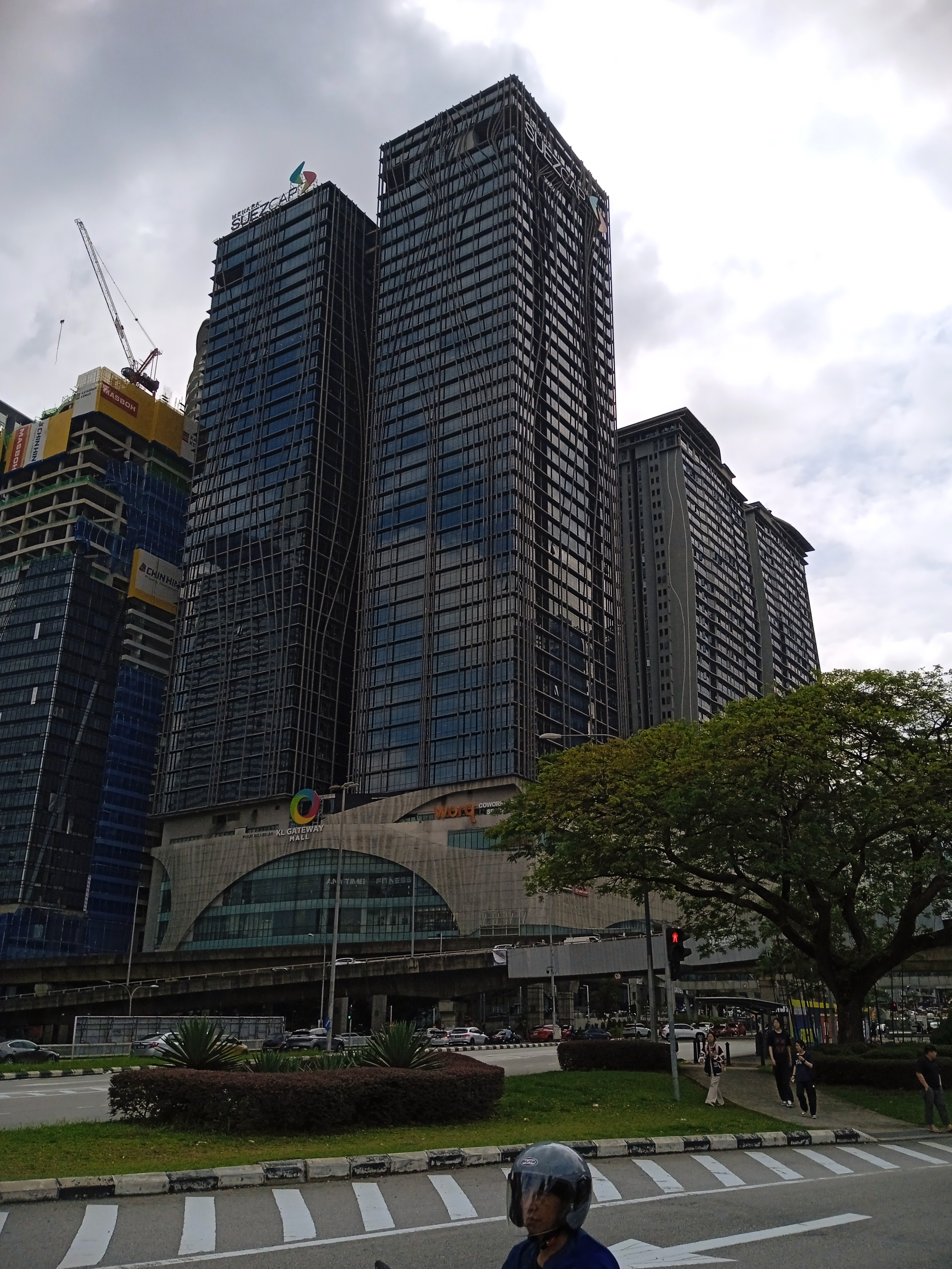
The KL Gateway Mall

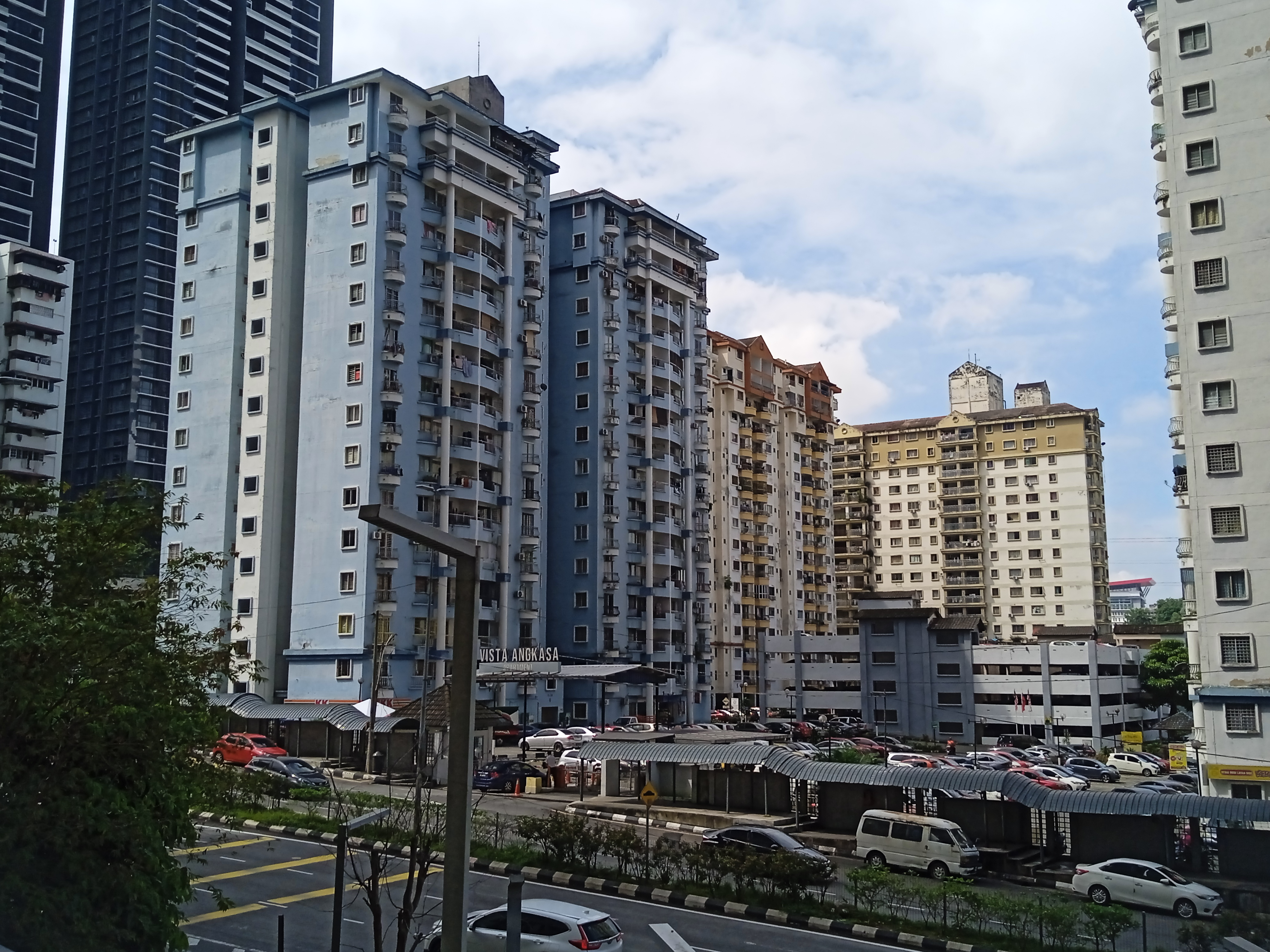
Vista Angkasa Apartments

- KL Gateway Mall
- Nexus
- The Sphere
- The Vertical
- The Horizon

== Name change issue ==
The name of Bangsar South has been an issue of controversy in light of the 2018 Malaysian general election. Parti Keadilan Rakyat politician Fahmi Fadzil, who was in the running for the Lembah Pantai parliamentary seat in which the area was included in, used the name change in his election campaign to distinguish Bangsar South and Kampung Kerinchi residents. As Kampung Kerinchi is the original name, used by Indonesian immigrants during British Malaya, he argues that the name should not be changed, which caused stirred discussion on social media. Bangsar South used to be known as Kampung Kerinchi until the name was changed by the Dewan Bandaraya Kuala Lumpur in 2012 to reflect its upgraded image.

Kampung Kerinchi name supporters, who consisted mainly of long-time settlers in the area, argued that the name change has been made directly by DBKL and politician in fast track without formal consultation or cooling period from neither new Bangsar South residents and old Kampung Kerinchi residents, and that the name should be kept for the sake of nostalgia. On the other hand, Bangsar South name supporters; mostly property investors and new owners of Bangsar South property, expressed dismay due to potential loss of investment in the area, as the name change to "Bangsar South" was part of the successful re-branding that has attract investors. Others argued that while the name change is encouraged, there are issues such as rising gentrification in the area that needs to be solved first.

After the general elections, MP Fahmi Fadzil who won the seat for Lembah Pantai, worked with DBKL to rename the area Bangsar South and the surrounding area as "Kampung Kerinchi". He has since clarified that this was caused due to a confusion that Bangsar South occupied a larger area, and was re-defined to only refer to the commercial development in the area.
