= Taman Sri Sinar =

- Township
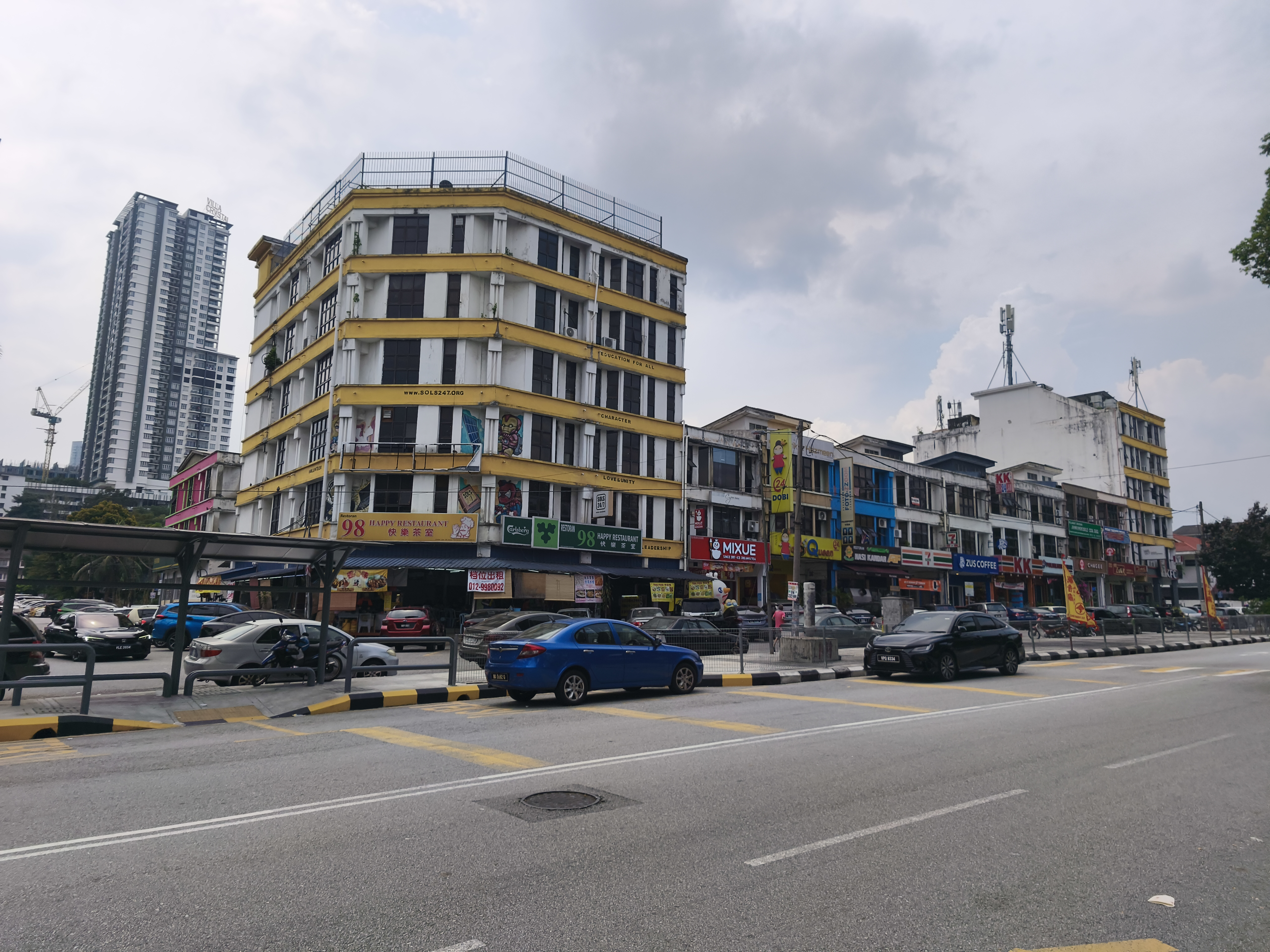
- Taman Sri Sinar commercial shoplots

- Location Malaysia
- Coordinates: 3°11′13″N 101°39′2″E
- Country: Malaysia
- State: Federal Territory of Kuala Lumpur
- Mukim: Batu
- Constituency: Segambut

Government
  - Local Authority: Dewan Bandaraya Kuala Lumpur
  - Mayor: Mhd Amin Nordin Abdul Aziz

Area
  - Total: 0.42 km^{2} (0.16 sq mi)
- Elevation: 56 m (184 ft)

Population
  - Estimate (2010): 40,000
- Time zone: UTC+8 (MST)
- Postcode: 51200

Taman Sri Sinar is a housing estate in Kuala Lumpur, Malaysia. It is located in the northwest of the Segambut constituency and is surrounded by Taman Sri Bintang, Segambut Jaya, Taman Seri Kepong Baru, Taman Bukit Segambut, Taman Segambut Aman and Taman Segambut Damai. It has an estimated population of 40,000 as of 2010. This area is in the Federal Territory of Kuala Lumpur with Kuala Lumpur City Hall (DBKL) as its local authority.

== History ==
=== Foundation of Taman Sri Sinar ===
Taman Sri Sinar was formerly a rubber tree estate. However, with the fall of the rubber industry in Kuala Lumpur and rapid development of the surrounding area, Taman Sri Sinar transitioned into a residential neighborhood. It is unknown in which year the settlement was founded.

== Demographics ==
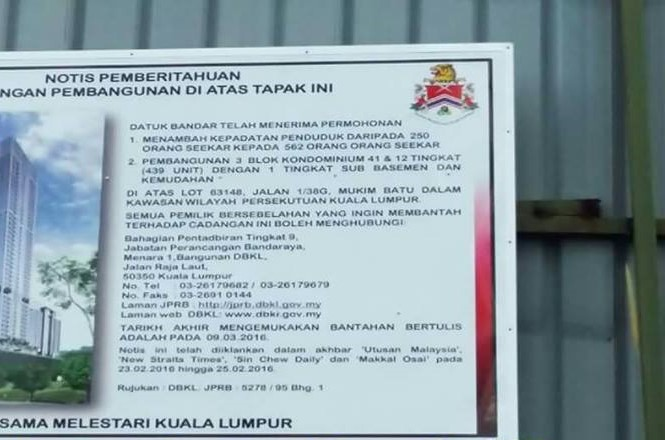
Notice by Kuala Lumpur City Hall

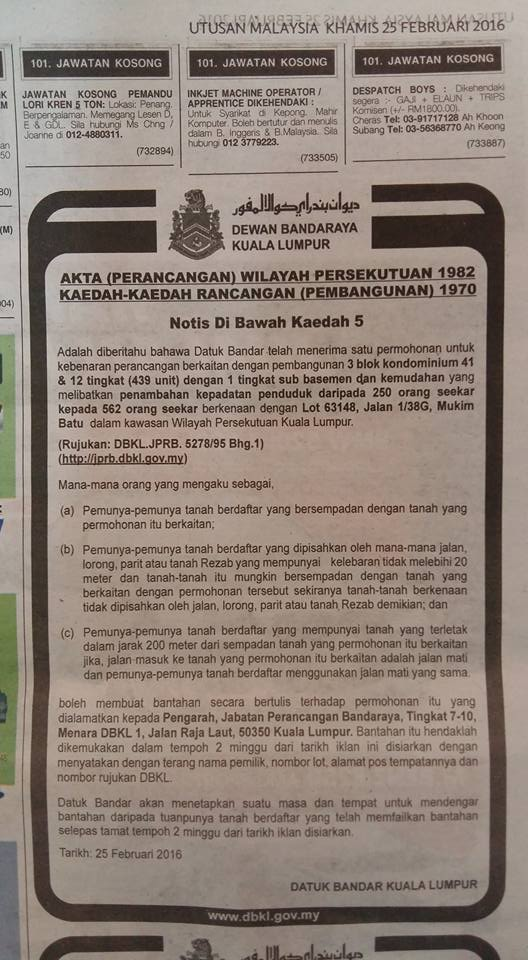
Notice by DBKL at Utusan Malaysia

The estimated population of Taman Sri Sinar is 40,000 as of 2010. It has a current population density of 250 inhabitants per acre. Kuala Lumpur City Hall officials predict that the population density will increase to 562 inhabitants per acre.

Taman Sri Sinar has a high Chinese population, and a minority of Malay and Indian population. Notable numbers of foreign workers also reside in Taman Sri Sinar.

=== Religions ===
For the fulfilling of religious duties, there are services like the Na Tuk Kong shrine and the Surau Al-Muttaqin shrine are located inside Taman Sri Sinar and the Surau Al-Muttaqin is located along Jalan 8/38d, while the Na Tuk Kong Shrine is located at Jalan 15/38D. Additionally there is a Guanyin temple located at 34, Jalan 25/38a.

== Education ==
=== Schools ===
Primary schools:

- Sekolah Kebangsaan Taman Seri Sinar

Preschool:

- Tadika Bercahaya Brilliant
- Smart Readers Kids
- Tadika Sri Sinar

Non-Profit-Organization：

- SOLS 24/7

== Infrastructure ==
=== Expressways ===
- Duta–Ulu Klang Expressway (DUKE)

=== Buses ===
- Route 121 (Taman Sri Sinar - HAB Medan Pasar) -The operational hours are from 5:30 AM to 11 PM with a busy period of 20 minutes during morning and evening peak hours, effective 15 March 2016. The operator is Selangor Omnibus.

=== MRT ===
- The area is planned to be served by an underground station on the MRT Circle Line in the future which will be the CC05 Taman Sri Sinar MRT station. It will also have a Park & Ride as a parking lot next to the station.

== Politics ==
Taman Sri Sinar is part of the Segambut constituency of the Dewan Rakyat in the Malaysian Parliament. The current representative is Hannah Yeoh from Pakatan Harapan / Democratic Action Party.

According to the electoral register for the Fourth Quarter of 2012, Taman Sri Sinar is the area with the most Chinese voters within the Segambut constituency, while Taman Sri Sinar is also the area with the second most voters in Segambut constituency.
