= UOA Group =

Malaysian property development company

United Overseas Australia Ltd
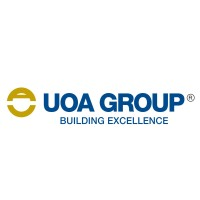
- Company type: Public limited company
- Traded as: ASX: UOS; SGX: EH5
- Industry: Property development; Property investment
- Founded: 1987; 39 years ago
- Headquarters: UOA Corporate Tower; Bangsar South, Kuala Lumpur, Malaysia
- Key people: Kong Chong Soon (Founder, Chairman & CEO); Kong Pak Lim (Founder, Executive Director)
- Revenue: ▼ A$324 million (2016)
- Net income: ▲ A$250 million (2016)
- Total assets: ▲ A$2,109 million (2016)
- Total equity: ▲ A$1,649 million (2016)
- Subsidiaries: UOA Development Bhd (69.11%); UOA Real Estate Investment Trust (46%)
- Website: uoa.com.my

United Overseas Australia Ltd (UOA Group) is a property development and investment company whose operations are based mainly in Malaysia. The group's parent company is incorporated in Australia and listed on the Australian Securities Exchange and the Singapore Exchange. It has developed and constructed various commercial and residential projects in the Klang Valley, most notably the mixed-use Bangsar South district within Kuala Lumpur.

UOA was founded in 1987 by Malaysian engineers Kong Chong Soon and Kong Pak Lim. Prior to starting UOA, Chong Soon and Pak Lim were involved in the construction industry in Singapore and Australia respectively. The group moved its headquarters to Kuala Lumpur in 1989 and has focused its operations in Malaysia since. Up to the late 2000s, it had completed projects with an aggregate gross development value of over RM3 billion, comprising mainly small to medium-sized commercial and residential developments.

In 2005, the group transferred several of its investment properties into UOA Real Estate Investment Trust (UOA REIT) and listed the REIT on Bursa Malaysia. UOA REIT's portfolio comprises parcels of UOA Damansara in Bukit Damansara, UOA Center in Kuala Lumpur City Centre, and UOA Pantai in Lembah Pantai. Tower B of Menara UOA Bangsar, which was completed by the group in 2008, was subsequently added to the REIT. The group remains the majority unitholder of the REIT and manages the trust via UOA Asset Management Sdn Bhd.

Work commenced on Bangsar South, the group's flagship development, in 2007. The 60-acre site was formerly a squatter colony in the Kerinchi area. The first phase was completed in 2011, and the district now contains residential and commercial buildings, hotels and a conference centre.

The group's main Malaysian property development arm, UOA Development Bhd, was listed on Bursa Malaysia in 2011.

In 2017, the group made its first foray into Australia by investing in development sites in East Perth and Leederville, Western Australia.
