= Primetime Emmy Award for Outstanding Lighting Design / Lighting Direction for a Variety Special =

Television award category

Primetime Emmy Award for Lighting Design / Lighting Direction for a Variety Special
- Awarded for: Outstanding Lighting Design / Lighting Direction for a Variety Special
- Country: United States
- Presented by: Academy of Television Arts & Sciences
- Currently held by: The Apple Music Super Bowl LX Halftime Show Starring Bad Bunny (2026)
- Website: emmys.com

The Primetime Emmy Award for Outstanding Lighting Design / Lighting Direction for a Variety Special is awarded to one television special each year. Prior to 2011, the award was bestowed as Outstanding Lighting Direction (Electronic, Multi-Camera) for Variety, Music or Comedy Programming and included both series and specials.

In the following list, the first titles listed in gold are the winners; those not in gold are nominees, which are listed in alphabetical order. The years given are those in which the ceremonies took place.

== Winners and nominations ==
=== 1970s ===
Year	Program	Episode	Nominees	Network
1979	Outstanding Individual Achievement - Special Class (Note: As a juried award, nominees had to garner 50% approval to win the award. The nominees did not meet the benchmark and no award was given.)			
1979	Baryshnikov at the White House		Harry Bottorf, Dave Clark, Michael Rosatti	PBS
1979	A Gift of Song: The Music for UNICEF Special		Carl J. Vitelli	NBC
1979	Rockette: A Holiday Tribute to Radio City Music Hall		Bill Klages	NBC

=== 1980s ===
Year	Program	Episode	Nominees	Network
1980	Outstanding Individual Achievement - Special Class (Note: As a juried award, nominees had to garner 50% approval to win the award. The nominees did not meet the benchmark and no award was given.)			
1980	A Christmas Carol at Ford's Theatre		Harry Bottorf, John Gisondi, William Knight, Dick Weiss	PBS
1980	Outstanding Individual Achievement - Special Events (Note: As a juried award, nominees had to garner 50% approval to win the award. The nominees did not meet the benchmark and no award was given.)			
1980	The 34th Annual Tony Awards		Carl Vitelli	CBS
1983
1983	Sheena Easton... Act One		Bob Pohle, John Rook, Ken Wilcox	NBC
1983	Motown 25: Yesterday, Today, Forever		John Freschi	NBC
1983	Rocky Mountain Holiday with John Denver and The Muppets		George Riesenberger	ABC
1983	Solid Gold Christmas Special '82		Robert Dickinson, C. Frank Olivas	Syndicated
1983	Special Bulletin		Carl Gibson	NBC
1984
1984	The 6th Annual Kennedy Center Honors: A Celebration of the Performing Arts		William M. Klages	CBS
1984	Frank Sinatra: Concert for the Americas		Fred "Red" McKinnon, Carl J. Vitelli	Syndicated
1984	Lynda Carter, Body and Soul		Fred "Red" McKinnon, Olin Younger	CBS
1984	Perry Como's Christmas in New York		Gregory Brunton	ABC
1984	Purlie		Alan Adelman, Randy Nordstrom	PBS
1985
1985	Dance in America: Baryshnikov by Tharp with the American Ballet Theatre (Great Performances)		Bill Klages, Arnie Smith	PBS
1985	Cat on a Hot Tin Roof (American Playhouse)		Ken Dettling, Danny Franks	PBS
1985	Motown Returns to the Apollo		Bill Klages	NBC
1985	Olympic Gala		John Freschi	ABC
1986
1986	Neil Diamond... Hello Again		Kim Killingsworth, Marilyn Lowey, John Rook	CBS
1986	The 58th Annual Academy Awards		Robert Dickinson, Tom Markle, Mark Palius	ABC
1986	The 21st Annual Academy of Country Music Awards		Ted Polmanski, Olin Younger	NBC
1986	The Execution of Raymond Graham		John Botelho, Fred "Red" McKinnon, Barney Stewart	ABC
1986	Nell Carter... Never Too Old to Dream		Ted Polmanski, John Rook	NBC
1987
1987	Diana Ross... Red Hot Rhythm and Blues		Gregory Brunton	ABC
1987	Carnegie Hall: The Grand Reopening		Alan Adelman	CBS
1987	Happy Birthday, Hollywood		Jeff Engel, Marc Palius	ABC
1987	Kraft Salutes the Magic of David Copperfield IX: The Escape from Alcatraz		Robert Dickinson	CBS
1987	Liberty Weekend Closing Ceremonies		Robert Dickinson, Olin Younger	ABC
1987	Liberty Weekend Opening Ceremonies		Gregory Brunton, Kieran Healy, Fred "Red" McKinnon	ABC
1988	Outstanding Lighting Direction (Electronic) for a Drama Series, Variety Series, Miniseries, Movie or Special			
1988	Julie Andrews... The Sound of Christmas		John Rook	ABC
1988	Barry Manilow: Big Fun on Swing Street		Bill Klages	CBS
1988	Willie Nelson, Texas Style		Olin Younger	CBS
1988	Outstanding Individual Achievement - Special Events (Note: As a juried award, nominees had to garner 50% approval to win the award.)			
1988	The 15th Annual American Music Awards		Marc Palius, Olin Younger	ABC
1989	Outstanding Lighting Direction (Electronic) for a Drama Series, Variety Series, Miniseries, Movie or Special			
1989	The Magic of David Copperfield XI: The Explosive Encounter		Robert Dickinson	CBS
1989	The Jim Henson Hour	"Dog City"	John Rook	NBC
1989	John Denver's Christmas in Aspen		Tom Beck, Kieran Healey	CBS
1989	A Raisin in the Sun (American Playhouse)		Ken Dettling, William M. Klages	PBS
1989	Kenny, Dolly and Willie: Something Inside So Strong		Jeff Engel	NBC
1989	Outstanding Lighting Direction (Electronic) for Special Events (Note: As a juried award, nominees had to garner 50% approval to win the award. The nominees did not meet the benchmark and no award was given.)			
1989	The 61st Annual Academy Awards		Marc Palius, John Rook	ABC

=== 1990s ===
Year	Program	Episode	Nominees	Network
1990
1990	The 17th Annual American Music Awards		Olin Younger	ABC
1990	Time Warner Presents "The Earth Day Special"		John Rook	ABC
1990	The 62nd Annual Academy Awards		Marc Palius, John Rook	ABC
1990	Dance in America: American Indian Dance Theater (Great Performances)		Alan Adelman	PBS
1990	The Tonight Show Starring Johnny Carson		William Merrill	NBC
1991
1991	The 33rd Annual Grammy Awards		William M. Klages	CBS
1991	The Magic of David Copperfield XIII: Mystery on the Orient Express		Robert Dickinson	CBS
1991	The 63rd Annual Academy Awards		Jeffrey M. Engel, Marc Palius	ABC
1991	Cher... at the Mirage		Marty Callner, Jeff Johnson, Tim Phelps, Jeff Ravitz	CBS
1991	The Tonight Show Starring Johnny Carson	"Louie Bellson, Dean Dill and Cirque du Soleil"	William Merrill	NBC
1992
1992	The Magic of David Copperfield XIV: Flying... Live the Dream		Robert Dickinson	CBS
1992	The 64th Annual Academy Awards		Jeffrey M. Engel, Marc Palius	ABC
1992	Cirque du Soleil II: A New Experience		Sylvian Brault	HBO
1992	Comic Relief V		Jeffrey M. Engel	HBO
1992	The Tonight Show Starring Johnny Carson		William Merrill	NBC
1993
1993	The 52nd Presidential Inauguration Gala		John Rook	CBS
1993	The 65th Annual Academy Awards		Robert Dickinson	ABC
1993	An American Reunion: The People's Inaugural Celebration		Jules Fisher, Simon Miles	HBO
1993	Michael Jackson Talks to... Oprah: 90 Primetime Minutes with the King of Pop		Gregory Brunton	ABC
1994
1994	World War II: When Lions Roared		Rod Yamane	NBC
1994	The 66th Annual Academy Awards		Robert Dickinson	ABC
1994	Late Show with David Letterman		Ruth Roberts	CBS
1994	The Tony Awards		William M. Klages	CBS
1994	Yanni: Live at the Acropolis		David Kaniski, Richard Ocean, Lee Rose	PBS
1995
1995	The Magic of David Copperfield XVI: Unexplained Forces		Robert Dickinson, John C. Morgan	CBS
1995	Barbra Streisand: The Concert		Simon Miles, Peter Morse	HBO
1995	Disney's Nancy Kerrigan Special: Dreams on Ice		William M. Klages	CBS
1995	The Kennedy Center Presents: The Concert of the Americas		Jeffrey M. Engel	PBS
1995	Tibor Rudas Presents The Three Tenors in Concert 1994		Olin Younger	PBS
1995	The 1994 Tony Awards		William M. Klages	CBS
1996
1996	The 68th Annual Academy Awards		Greg Brunton	ABC
1996	The 38th Annual Grammy Awards		Robert Dickinson, John C. Morgan	CBS
1996	Muppets Tonight	"Tony Bennett"	Olin Younger	ABC
1996	Neil Diamond... Under a Tennessee Moon		John Rook	ABC
1996	The 1995 Tony Awards		William M. Klages	CBS
1997
1997	Bette Midler: Diva Las Vegas		Allen Branton, Peter Morse	HBO
1997	Centennial Olympic Games: Opening Ceremonies		Robert Barnhart, Robert Dickinson, John C. Morgan	NBC
1997	Disney's Beauty and the Beast: A Concert on Ice		Bill Klages	CBS
1997	The 39th Annual Grammy Awards		Robert Dickinson, John C. Morgan	CBS
1997	The Tonight Show with Jay Leno	"1082"	Gary Thorns	NBC
1998
1998	The 70th Annual Academy Awards		Robert Barnhart, Robert Dickinson, Matt Ford, Andy O'Reilly	ABC
1998	ER	"Ambush"	Richard Thorpe	NBC
1998	Fleetwood Mac: The Dance		Robert Dickinson, John C. Morgan	MTV
1998	Garth: Live from Central Park		Mike Baldassari, Dave Butzler, Dave Hill, Patrick Woodroffe	HBO
1998	Politically Incorrect with Bill Maher	"Ron Silver, Matthew Modine, Faye Anderson and Harlan Ellison"	Phil Callan, Jeff Engel, Tim Sheldon	ABC
1998	Yanni: Tribute		Matt Firestone, Dietrich Juengling, David Kaniski, Paul Lennon, Warwick Price, Lee Rose	PBS
1999
1999	The 71st Annual Academy Awards		Robert Barnhart, Robert Dickinson, Matt Ford, Andy O'Reilly	ABC
1999	Janet: The Velvet Rope		Jerry Watson	HBO
1999	Opening the Lost Tombs — Live from Egypt		Greg Brunton	Fox
1999	The 78th Annual Miss America Pageant		Jeff Engel, Victor Fable	ABC
1999	The Three Tenors: Paris 1998		Olin Younger	PBS

Between 2000 and 2010, series and specials competed together for Outstanding Lighting Direction (Electronic).

=== 2010s ===
Year	Program	Nominees	Network
2011	The 53rd Annual Grammy Awards	Robert Dickinson, Jon Kusner, Andy O'Reilly, Travis Hagenbuch	CBS
2011	83rd Annual Academy Awards	Robert Dickinson, Robert Barnhart, Andy O'Reilly, Jon Kusner	ABC
2011	Lady Gaga Presents the Monster Ball Tour: At Madison Square Garden	LeRoy Bennett, Tom Beck	HBO
2012	The 54th Annual Grammy Awards	Robert Dickinson, Jon Kusner, Andy O'Reilly, Travis Hagenbuch	CBS
2012	Andrea Bocelli: Live in Central Park (Great Performances)	Robert Barnhart, Ted Wells, Matt Firestone, Harry Sangmeister	PBS
2012	84th Annual Academy Awards	Robert Dickinson, Robert Barnhart, Jon Kusner, Andy O'Reilly	ABC
2012	Super Bowl XLVI Halftime Show Starring Madonna	Al Gurdon, Robert Barnhart, David Grill, Michael Owen	NBC
2012	Victoria's Secret Fashion Show 2011	Jon Kusner, Matt Firestone, Harry Sangmeister, Nick Collier	CBS
2013	Super Bowl XLVII Halftime Show Starring Beyoncé	Al Gurdon, Robert Barnhart, David Grill, Michael Owen	CBS
2013	Andrea Bocelli: Love in Portofino (Great Performances)	Robert Barnhart, David Grill	PBS
2013	The 55th Annual Grammy Awards	Robert Dickinson, Jon Kusner, Harrison Lippman, Travis Hagenbuch	CBS
2013	London 2012 Olympic Games Opening Ceremony	Patrick Woodroffe, Adam Bassett, Al Gurdon, Tim Routledge	NBC
2013	The Oscars	Robert Dickinson, Robert Barnhart, Andy O'Reilly, Jon Kusner	ABC
2013	2013 Rock and Roll Hall of Fame Induction Ceremony	Allen Branton, Kevin Lawson, Felix Peralta	HBO
2014	Sochi 2014 Olympic Winter Games Opening Ceremony	Al Gurdon, Peter Canning, Michael Owen, Ross Williams	NBC
2014	The Beatles: The Night That Changed America	Matt Firestone, Ted Wells, Matthew Cotter, Mike Zinman	CBS
2014	The 56th Annual Grammy Awards	Robert Dickinson, Andy O'Reilly, Jon Kusner, Harrison Lippman, Patrick Boozer	CBS
2014	The Oscars	Robert Dickinson, Robert Barnhart, Andy O'Reilly, Jon Kusner	ABC
2014	67th Annual Tony Awards	Robert Dickinson, Noah A. Mitz, Harry Sangmeister, Ed McCarthy	CBS
2014	Super Bowl XLVIII Halftime Show Starring Bruno Mars	Robert Barnhart, Pete Radice, David Grill, LeRoy Bennett	Fox
2015
2015	Super Bowl XLIX Halftime Show Starring Katy Perry	Robert Barnhart, David Grill, Pete Radice, Jason Rudolph	NBC
2015	Dancing with the Stars: 10th Anniversary Special	Simon Miles, Suzanne Sotelo, Matthew Cotter	ABC
2015	The 57th Annual Grammy Awards	Robert Dickinson, Andy O'Reilly, Jon Kusner, Patrick Boozer, Harrison Lippman	CBS
2015	The Oscars	Robert Dickinson, Robert Barnhart, Andy O'Reilly, Jon Kusner	ABC
2015	Saturday Night Live 40th Anniversary Special	Phil Hymes, Geoff Amoral, Rick McGuinness	NBC
2016
2016	Grease: Live	Al Gurdon, Travis Hagenbuch, Madigan Stehly, Will Gossett, Ryan Tanker	Fox
2016	Adele Live in New York City	Allen Branton, Patrick Woodroffe, Tom Beck, Eric Marchwinski, George Gountas	NBC
2016	The Oscars	Robert Dickinson, Robert Barnhart, Andy O'Reilly, Jon Kusner	ABC
2016	Super Bowl 50 Halftime Show	Robert Barnhart, David Grill, Pete Radice, Jason Rudolph	CBS
2016	The Wiz Live!	Allen Branton, Darren Langer, Kevin Lawson, Felix Peralta, Eric Marchwinski, Kirk Miller	NBC
2017
2017	Super Bowl LI Halftime Show Starring Lady Gaga	Robert Barnhart, David Grill, Pete Radice, Jason Rudolph	Fox
2017	The 59th Annual Grammy Awards	Robert Dickinson, Noah Mitz, Andy O'Reilly, Patrick Boozer, Ryan Tanker	CBS
2017	Hairspray Live!	Allen Branton, Felix Peralta, Kevin Lawson, Darren Langer, Kirk J. Miller	NBC
2017	The Oscars	Robert Dickinson, Travis Hagenbuch, Mike Berger, Andy O'Reilly, Patrick Boozer	ABC
2017	The 70th Annual Tony Awards	Robert Dickinson, Ed McCarthy, Noah Mitz, Harry Sangmeister, Ted Wells	CBS
2018
2018	Jesus Christ Superstar Live in Concert	Al Gurdon, Travis Hagenbuch, Ben Green, Kirk J. Miller, Eric Christian	NBC
2018	The 60th Annual Grammy Awards	Robert Dickinson, Noah Mitz, Andy O'Reilly, Patrick Boozer, Ryan Tanker	CBS
2018	The Oscars	Robert Dickinson, Travis Hagenbuch, Mike Berger, Andy O'Reilly, Patrick Boozer, Ben Green	ABC
2018	Super Bowl LII Halftime Show Starring Justin Timberlake	Robert Barnhart, David Grill, Pete Radice, Jason Rudolph	NBC
2018	The 71st Annual Tony Awards	Robert Dickinson, Ed McCarthy, Noah Mitz, Harry Sangmeister, RJ Styles	CBS
2019
2019	RENT	Al Gurdon, Madigan Stehly, Ben Green, Ryan Tanker, Patrick Brazil	Fox
2019	The 61st Grammy Awards	Robert Dickinson, Noah Mitz, Michael Berger, Will Gossett, Madigan Stehly, Andy O'Reilly, Patrick Boozer, Ryan Tanker	CBS
2019	The Kennedy Center Honors	Robert Dickinson, Travis Hagenbuch, Michael Berger, Harry Sangmeister	CBS
2019	The Oscars	Robert Dickinson, Travis Hagenbuch, Michael Berger, Andy O'Reilly, Patrick Boozer, Ben Green	ABC
2019	The 72nd Annual Tony Awards	Robert Dickinson, Noah Mitz, Ed McCarthy, Harry Sangmeister	CBS

=== 2020s ===
Year	Program	Nominees	Network
2020
2020	Super Bowl LIV Halftime Show Starring Jennifer Lopez and Shakira	Robert Barnhart, David Grill, Pete Radice, Patrick Brazil, Jason Rudolph	Fox
2020	The 62nd Grammy Awards	Robert Dickinson, Noah Mitz, Andy O'Reilly, Patrick Boozer, Madigan Stehly, William Gossett, Ryan Tanker, Matthew Cotter	CBS
2020	The Kennedy Center Honors	Robert Dickinson, Michael Berger, William Gossett, Bryan Klunder, Harry Sangmeister, Jason Rudolph	CBS
2020	The Oscars	Robert Dickinson, Noah Mitz, Michael Berger, Andy O'Reilly, Patrick Boozer, Ben Green	ABC
2020	The 73rd Annual Tony Awards	Robert Dickinson, Noah Mitz, Ed McCarthy, Harry Sangmeister	CBS
2021
2021	David Byrne's American Utopia	Rob Sinclair, Brian Spett	HBO
2021	Friends: The Reunion	Noah Mitz, Madigan Stehly, Russell Fine, Lynn Costa, Patrick Boozer	HBO Max
2021	The 63rd Annual Grammy Awards	Noah Mitz, Madigan Stehly, Andy O'Reilly, Patrick Boozer, William Gossett, Ryan Tanker, Matthew Cotter	CBS
2021	The Oscars	Robert Dickinson, Noah Mitz, Michael Berger, Ben Green, Andy O'Reilly, Patrick Boozer	ABC
2021	The Pepsi Super Bowl LV Halftime Show Starring The Weeknd	Al Gurdon, Ben Green, Jeff Nellis, Mark Humphrey, Eric Marchwinski, Jason Rudolph, Alen Sisul	CBS
2022
2022	Adele: One Night Only	Noah Mitz, Bryan Klunder, Patrick Boozer, Patrick Brazil, Matthew Cotter	CBS
2022	Annie Live!	Robert Barnhart, Pete Radice, Ben Green, Madigan Stehly, Robert Styles	NBC
2022	The 64th Annual Grammy Awards	Noah Mitz, Madigan Stehly, Bryan Klunder, Andy O'Reilly, Patrick Boozer, Ryan Tanker, Erin Anderson, Matthew Cotter	CBS
2022	One Last Time: An Evening with Tony Bennett and Lady Gaga	Leroy Bennett, Jason Baeri	CBS
2022	The Tony Awards Present: Broadway's Back!	Noah Mitz, Ed McCarthy, Harry Sangmeister, Richard Beck, Jason Rudolph	CBS
2023
2023	2022 Rock & Roll Hall of Fame Induction Ceremony	Allen Branton, Darren Langer, Felix Peralta, Kevin Lawson, Alex Flores, Bianca Moncada, Chuck Reilly, Guy Jones	HBO
2023	Encanto at the Hollywood Bowl	Al Gurdon, Harry Forster, Bobby Grey, Darien Koop, James Coldicott, Chris Hill, Ed Moore	Disney+
2023	The 65th Annual Grammy Awards	Noah Mitz, Andy O'Reilly, Patrick Boozer, Ryan Tanker, Madigan Stehly, Bryan Klunder, Erin Anderson, Will Gossett, Matthew Cotter, Terrance Ho, Guy Jones	CBS
2023	75th Annual Tony Awards	Robert Dickinson, Noah Mitz, Harry Sangmeister, Tyler Ericson, Richard Beck, Jason Rudolph, Ed McCarthy, JM Hurley, Ka Lai Wong	CBS
2023	The Weeknd Live at SoFi Stadium	Jason Baeri, Joe Bay, Kille Knobel, Mark Butts, Loren Barton	HBO
2024
2024	Billy Joel: The 100th — Live at Madison Square Garden	Steve Cohen, Mark Foffano, Justin Cheatham, Tad Inferrera, Adrian Bassett	CBS
2024	The Apple Music Super Bowl LVIII Halftime Show Starring Usher	Al Gurdon, Ben Green, Harry Forster, Mark Humphrey, Eric Marchwinski, Alen Sisul	CBS
2024	The 66th Grammy Awards	Noah Mitz, Andy O'Reilly, Patrick Boozer, Ryan Tanker, Madigan Stehly, Bryan Klunder, Matt Benson, Will Gossett, Erin Anderson, Terrance Ho, Guy Jones, Matt Cotter	CBS
2024	2023 Rock and Roll Hall of Fame Induction Ceremony	Allen Branton, Kevin Lawson, Felix Peralta, George Gountas, Alex Flores, Billy Steinberg, JC Castro, Bianca Moncada	ABC
2024	The 76th Annual Tony Awards	Robert Dickinson, Noah Mitz, Ed McCarthy, Tyler Ericson, Harry Sangmeister, Richie Beck, J.M. Hurley, Ka Lai Wong, Jason Rudolph	CBS
2025
2025	The 67th Annual Grammy Awards	Noah Mitz, Andy O'Reilly, Patrick Boozer, Ryan Tanker, Erin Anderson, Madigan Stehly, William Gossett, Bryan Klunder, Hannah Kerman, Matt Benson, Matthew Cotter, Guy Jones, Kevin Faust	CBS
2025	2024 Rock and Roll Hall of Fame Induction Ceremony	Allen Branton, Felix Peralta, Kevin Lawson, George Gountas, Bianca Moncada, Alex Flores, Guy Jones, J.C. Castro	ABC
2025	SNL50: The Anniversary Special	Geoffrey Amoral, Rick McGuinness, William McGuinness, Trevor Brown, Tim Stasse, Frank Grisanti, Reginald Campbell	NBC
2025	SNL50: The Homecoming Concert	Tom Sutherland, Harry Forster, Hunter Selby, Bobby Grey, Ryan Tanker, Chris Roseli, Matt Cotter, JM Hurley, Bob Benedetti	Peacock
2026
2026	The Apple Music Super Bowl LX Halftime Show Starring Bad Bunny	Al Gurdon, Ben Green, Harry Forster, Mark Humphrey, Eric Marchwinski, Alen Sisul, Lee Spencer, Jason Rudolph	NBC
2026	The 68th Annual Grammy Awards	Noah Mitz, Madigan Stehly, Will Gossett, Hannah Kerman, Andy O'Reilly, Patrick Boozer, Ryan Tanker, Erin Anderson, Matt Benson, Matthew Cotter, Terrance Ho, Guy Jones	CBS
2026	The Oscars	Robert Dickinson, Noah Mitz, Ryan Tanker, Will Gossett, Jeff Behm, Tyler Ericson, Hannah Kerman, Andy O'Reilly, Akash Bartlett, Guy Jones, Kevin Faust, Terrance Ho	ABC
2026	The 78th Annual Tony Awards	Robert Dickinson, Ed McCarthy, Tyler Ericson, Madigan Stehly, Harry Sangmeister, Chris Moeller, Jason Rudolph, JM Hurley, Ka Lai Wong	CBS
2026	Wicked: One Wonderful Night	Bryan Klunder, Noah Mitz, Andrew O'Reilly, Patrick Boozer, Ryan Healey, Alen Sisul, Mike Hankowsky, Jason Rudolph	NBC
