= Primetime Emmy Award for Outstanding Lighting Design / Lighting Direction for a Variety Series =

American television award

Primetime Emmy Award for Lighting Design / Lighting Direction for a Variety Series
- Awarded for: Outstanding Lighting Design / Lighting Direction for a Variety Series
- Country: United States
- Presented by: Academy of Television Arts & Sciences
- Currently held by: The Late Show with Stephen Colbert (2026)
- Website: emmys.com

The Primetime Emmy Award for Outstanding Lighting Design / Lighting Direction for a Variety Series is awarded to one television series each year. Prior to 2011, the award was bestowed as Outstanding Lighting Direction (Electronic, Multi-Camera) for Variety, Music or Comedy Programming. Separate awards now recognize series and variety specials.

In the following list, the first titles listed in gold are the winners; those not in gold are nominees, which are listed in alphabetical order. The years given are those in which the ceremonies took place.

== Winners and nominations ==
indicates the winner

Outstanding Lighting Direction (Electronic)

=== 1980s ===
Year	Program	Episode	Nominees	Network
1980 (32nd)
1980 (32nd)	F.D.R.: The Last Year		Peter G. Edwards, William Knight, Peter S. Passas	NBC
1980 (32nd)	The Big Show	"Sarah Purcell and Flip Wilson"	William M. Klages	NBC
1980 (32nd)	The Cheryl Ladd Special: Souvenirs		Fred McKinnon, Mark Palius	ABC
1980 (32nd)	Goldie and Liza Together		Daniel Flannery, William M. Klages	CBS
1980 (32nd)	The Tender Land		Tony Di Girolamo	PBS
1980 (32nd)	The Unbroken Circle: A Tribute to Mother Maybelle		John Freschi, George W. Riesenberger	CBS
1981 (33rd)
1981 (33rd)	Nureyev and the Joffrey Ballet in Tribute to Nijinsky (Great Performances)		Ralph Holmes	PBS
1981 (33rd)	A Bayou Legend		George Riesenberger	PBS
1981 (33rd)	Command Performance: The Stars Salute to the President		Fred McKinnon	NBC
1981 (33rd)	Diana		Allen Branton, Gregory Brunton	CBS
1981 (33rd)	The Osmond Family Christmas Show		Leard Davis	NBC
1981 (33rd)	Sixty Years of Seduction		Gregory Brunton	ABC
1981 (33rd)	The 35th Annual Tony Awards		Carl Vitelli	CBS
1982 (34th)
1982 (34th)	Working (American Playhouse)		George Riesenberger, Ken Dettling	PBS
1982 (34th)	Debby Boone... One Step Closer		Gregory Brunton	NBC
1982 (34th)	I Love Liberty		Fred McKinnon, Mark Palius	ABC
1982 (34th)	The Nashville Palace	"Tammy Wynette, George Jones and Minnie Pearl"	Leard Davis	NBC
1982 (34th)	Night of 100 Stars		William Klages	ABC
1982 (34th)	Solid Gold	"Marilyn McCoo and the Charlie Daniels Band"	Bob Dickinson, Harold Guy	Syndicated

Outstanding Lighting Direction (Electronic) for a Series

Year	Program	Episode	Nominees	Network
1983 (35th)
1983 (35th)	Solid Gold	"Dolly Parton"	Bob Dickinson, Frank Olivas	Syndicated
1983 (35th)	Benson	"Boys Night Out"	Alan K. Walker	ABC
1983 (35th)	Benson	"Death in a Funny Position"	Alan K. Walker, John C. Zak	ABC
1983 (35th)	Rock 'n' Roll Tonite	"Molly Hatchett and Quiet Riot"	Mikel Neiers, Kieran Healy	Syndicated
1984 (36th)
1984 (36th)	Solid Gold	"198"	Bob Dickinson, Frank Olivas	Syndicated
1984 (36th)	Night Court	"Birthday Boy"	Mikel Neiers	NBC
1984 (36th)	Night Court	"Bull's Baby"	John Appelroth	NBC
1984 (36th)	Oh Madeline	"Sisters"	Alan K. Walker	ABC
1985 (37th)
1985 (37th)	Mr. Belvedere	"Strangers in the Night"	George Spiro Dibie	ABC
1985 (37th)	Night Court	"Billie's Valentine"	John Appelroth	NBC
1985 (37th)	Night Court	"Bull Gets a Kid"	Mark Buxbaum	NBC
1985 (37th)	Solid Gold	"230"	Bob Dickinson	Syndicated
1986 (38th)
1986 (38th)	Solid Gold	"283"	Bob Dickinson	Syndicated
1986 (38th)	The Golden Girls	"On Golden Girls"	Alan K. Walker	NBC
1986 (38th)	Night Court	"Leon We Hardly Knew Ye"	George Spiro Dibie	NBC
1986 (38th)	Silver Spoons	"Rick Sings"	Mark Buxbaum	NBC
1986 (38th)	Who's the Boss?	"Charmed Lives"	Mark J. Levin	ABC
1987 (39th)
1987 (39th)	Growing Pains	"My Brother, Myself"	George Spiro Dibie	ABC
1987 (39th)	Keep on Cruisin'	"Mark C. Bloome"	Jeff Engel	CBS
1987 (39th)	Married... with Children	"But I Didn't Shoot the Deputy"	Mark Buxbaum	Fox
1987 (39th)	Who's the Boss?	"The Proposal"	Mark J. Levin	ABC

Outstanding Lighting Direction (Electronic) for a Comedy Series

Year	Program	Episode	Nominees	Network
1988 (40th)
1988 (40th)	The Charmings	"The Witch Is of Van Oaks"	Mark Buxbaum	ABC
1988 (40th)	The Golden Girls	"Old Friends"	Alan K. Walker	NBC
1988 (40th)	Married... with Children	"Girls Just Wanna Have Fun"	Ted C. Polmanski, Gavin Wishart	Fox
1988 (40th)	Night Court	"Constitution, Part 2"	George Spiro Dibie	NBC
1988 (40th)	Who's the Boss?	"Two on a Billboard"	Mark J. Levin	ABC
1989 (41st)
1989 (41st)	Who's the Boss?	"A Spirited Christmas"	Mark J. Levin	ABC
1989 (41st)	Family Ties	"Alex Doesn't Live Here Anymore"	Robert F. Liu	NBC
1989 (41st)	The Golden Girls	"Yokel Hero"	Alan K. Walker	NBC
1989 (41st)	Night Court	"Danny Got His Gun, Part 3"	Bob Berry	NBC

=== 1990s ===
Year	Program	Episode	Nominees	Network
1990 (42nd)
1990 (42nd)	Just the Ten of Us	"Highway to Heaven"	George Spiro Dibie	ABC
1990 (42nd)	Bagdad Cafe	"Prototype"	Donald A. Morgan	CBS
1990 (42nd)	The Golden Girls	"Ebb Tide"	Alan K. Walker	NBC
1990 (42nd)	Roseanne	"Boo"	Daniel Flannery	ABC
1990 (42nd)	Who's the Boss?	"The All-Nighter"	Mark J. Levin	ABC
1991 (43rd)
1991 (43rd)	Growing Pains	"Happy Halloween"	George Spiro Dibie	ABC
1991 (43rd)	The Golden Girls	"The Bloom Is Off the Rose"	Alan K. Walker	NBC
1991 (43rd)	Night Court	"Hey Harry, F'Crying Out Loud — It Is a Wonderful Life... Sorta"	Charles L. Barbee	NBC
1991 (43rd)	Who's the Boss?	"Starlight Memories"	Mark J. Levin	ABC
1992 (44th)
1992 (44th)	Home Improvement	"Luck Be a Taylor Tonight"	Donald A. Morgan	ABC
1992 (44th)	Davis Rules	"A Foggy Day on Puget Sound"	Jo Mayer	CBS
1992 (44th)	Growing Pains	"Home Malone"	George Spiro Dibie	ABC
1992 (44th)	Night Court	"A Guy Named Phantom, Part 1"	Charles L. Barbee	NBC
1993 (45th)
1993 (45th)	Home Improvement	"Bye Bye Birdie"	Donald A. Morgan	ABC
1993 (45th)	Blossom	"Ruby"	Alan K. Walker	NBC
1993 (45th)	Dudley	"It Was a Wonderful Life"	George Spiro Dibie, Kim Killingsworth	CBS
1993 (45th)	Roseanne	"Halloween IV"	Daniel Flannery	ABC
1994 (46th)
1994 (46th)	Home Improvement	"Twas the Blight"	Donald A. Morgan	ABC
1994 (46th)	The John Larroquette Show	"Pilot"	Alan K. Walker	NBC
1994 (46th)	Roseanne	"White Trash Christmas"	Daniel Flannery	ABC
1995 (47th)
1995 (47th)	Home Improvement	"My Dinner with Wilson"	Donald A. Morgan	ABC
1995 (47th)	Sister, Sister	"It's a Love Thang"	George Spiro Dibie	ABC
1995 (47th)	The John Larroquette Show	"In the Pink"	Alan K. Walker	NBC
1995 (47th)	Living Single	"Thanks for Giving"	Bryan Hays	Fox
1996 (48th)
1996 (48th)	Home Improvement	"Room Without a View"	Donald A. Morgan	ABC
1996 (48th)	The Fresh Prince of Bel-Air	"Burnin' Down the House"	Art Busch	NBC
1996 (48th)	The John Larroquette Show	"Here We Go Again"	Alan K. Walker	NBC
1996 (48th)	Living Single	"A Raze in Harlem"	Bryan Hays	Fox
1996 (48th)	Sister, Sister	"Thanksgiving in Hawaii, Part 2"	George Spiro Dibie	The WB
1997 (49th)
1997 (49th)	Cosby	"Pilot"	Alan K. Walker	CBS
1997 (49th)	Home Improvement	"I Was a Teenage Taylor"	Donald A. Morgan	ABC
1997 (49th)	In the House	"Curse of the Hill House"	Art Busch	UPN
1997 (49th)	The Larry Sanders Show	"Ellen, or Isn't She"	Peter Smokler	HBO
1997 (49th)	Sister, Sister	"The Ski Squad"	George Spiro Dibie	The WB
1998 (50th)
1998 (50th)	Home Improvement	"A Night to Dismember"	Donald A. Morgan	ABC
1998 (50th)	The Larry Sanders Show	"Flip"	Peter Smokler	HBO
1998 (50th)	The Nanny	"The Wedding"	James Jensen	CBS
1998 (50th)	Sister, Sister	"Mo' Credit, Mo' Problems"	George Spiro Dibie	The WB
1999 (51st)
1999 (51st)	Home Improvement	"Mark's Big Break"	Donald A. Morgan	ABC
1999 (51st)	Mr. Show with Bob and David	"Like Chickens... Delicious Chickens"	Simon Miles	HBO
1999 (51st)	Rude Awakening	"Don't Do the Strippers"	Alan K. Walker	Showtime

Outstanding Lighting Direction (Electronic)

=== 2000s ===
Year	Program	Episode	Nominees	Network
2000 (52nd)
2000 (52nd)	Fail Safe		John A. Alonzo, Kim Killingsworth	CBS
2000 (52nd)	The 72nd Annual Academy Awards		Robert Barnhart, Robert A. Dickinson, Matt Firestone, Andy O'Reilly	ABC
2000 (52nd)	Arista Records' 25th Anniversary Celebration		Olin Younger	NBC
2000 (52nd)	Cher: Live in Concert — From the MGM Grand in Las Vegas		Tom Beck, Allen Branton, Christian Choi, Victor Fable, Michael Goodwin, Jeff Johnson, Jim Straw, Patrick Woodroffe	HBO
2000 (52nd)	The Tonight Show with Jay Leno	"1738"	Patrick Steele, Gary Thorns	NBC

Outstanding Lighting Direction (Electronic, Multi-Camera) for Variety, Music or Comedy Programming

Year	Program	Episode	Nominees	Network
2001 (53rd)
2001 (53rd)	Bruce Springsteen & The E Street Band		Gregg Maltby, Jeff Ravitz	HBO
2001 (53rd)	The 73rd Annual Academy Awards		Robert Barnhart, Robert A. Dickinson, Matt Firestone, Andy O'Reilly	ABC
2001 (53rd)	Barbra Streisand: Timeless		Bob Dickinson, Peter Morse	Fox
2001 (53rd)	Politically Incorrect with Bill Maher	"01-921"	Jeff Engel	ABC
2001 (53rd)	The Tonight Show with Jay Leno	"1865"	Patrick Steele, Gary Thorns	NBC
2002 (54th)
2002 (54th)	Opening Ceremony Salt Lake 2002 Olympic Winter Games		Robert A. Dickinson, David Grill, Andy O'Reilly	NBC
2002 (54th)	The 74th Annual Academy Awards		Robert Barnhart, Robert A. Dickinson, Andy O'Reilly	ABC
2002 (54th)	A&E in Concert: Sting in Tuscany ...All This Time		Stan Crocker, David Rudd	A&E
2002 (54th)	America: A Tribute to Heroes		LeRoy Bennett, Patrick Dierson, Matt Ford, Kieran Healy, Rod Yemane	(Note: America: A Tribute to Heroes was simulcast live on 35 network and cable outlets. The Emmys listed no individual network with this nomination.)
2002 (54th)	Survivor	"Finale and Reunion"	Tim Sheldon	CBS
2003 (55th)
2003 (55th)	The 75th Annual Academy Awards		Robert Barnhart, Robert A. Dickinson, Andy O'Reilly	ABC
2003 (55th)	American Idol	"Finale"	Matt Ford, Kieran Healy, George Harvey	Fox
2003 (55th)	Cher — The Farewell Tour		Bob Barnhart, Bobby Dickinson, Matt Firestone, Abby Holmes, Kille Knobel	NBC
2003 (55th)	Rolling Stones — Licks World Tour, Live from Madison Square Garden		Robert Barnhart, Dave Hill, Jim Straw, Ethan Weber, Patrick Woodroffe	HBO
2004 (56th)
2004 (56th)	The 46th Annual Grammy Awards		Robert Barnhart, Robert A. Dickinson, Matt Firestone, Andy O'Reilly	CBS
2004 (56th)	A&E in Concert: Paul McCartney in Red Square		Roy Bennett, Craig Braden, Wally Lees	A&E
2004 (56th)	A&E in Concert: Sting — Sacred Love		Stan Crocker, David Rudd	A&E
2004 (56th)	The 76th Annual Academy Awards		Robert A. Dickinson, Robert Barnhart, Andy O'Reilly	ABC
2004 (56th)	American Idol	"Finale"	Matthew Firestone, Kieran Healy, George Harvey	Fox
2004 (56th)	Late Show with David Letterman	"2117"	Steven Brill, Timothy Stephenson	CBS
2005 (57th)
2005 (57th)	The Games Of The XXVIII Olympiad — Opening Ceremony		Eleftheria Deko, Robert A. Dickinson, Andy O'Reilly, Theodore Tsevas, Ted Wells	NBC
2005 (57th)	The 77th Annual Academy Awards		Robert A. Dickinson, Robert Barnhart, Andy O'Reilly	ABC
2005 (57th)	American Idol	"Finale, Part 2"	Kieran Healy, George Harvey, Eli McKinney	Fox
2005 (57th)	Eric Clapton Crossroads Guitar Festival (Great Performances)		Stan Crocker	PBS
2005 (57th)	Late Show with David Letterman	"2269"	Steven Brill, Timothy Stephenson	CBS
2006 (58th)
2006 (58th)	2005 American Music Awards		Harry Sangmeister, Olin Younger	ABC
2006 (58th)	The 78th Annual Academy Awards		Robert A. Dickinson, Robert Barnhart, Andy O'Reilly	ABC
2006 (58th)	American Idol	"American Classics Songbook with Rod Stewart"	Kieran Healy, George Harvey, Eli McKinney	Fox
2006 (58th)	American Idol	"Finale"	Kieran Healy, George Harvey, Harry Sangmeister	Fox
2006 (58th)	Late Night with Conan O'Brien	"2226"	Fred Bock	NBC
2007 (59th)
2007 (59th)	The 49th Annual Grammy Awards		Robert A. Dickinson, Matt Firestone, Andy O'Reilly	CBS
2007 (59th)	The 79th Annual Academy Awards		Robert A. Dickinson, Robert Barnhart, Andy O'Reilly	ABC
2007 (59th)	American Idol	"Finale"	Kieran Healy, George Harvey, Harry Sangmeister	Fox
2007 (59th)	Dancing with the Stars	"308"	Simon Miles	ABC
2007 (59th)	Late Night with Conan O'Brien	"2408"	Fred Bock, Ronnie Skopac, Eugene Meienhofer	NBC
2008 (60th)
2008 (60th)	The 50th Annual Grammy Awards		Robert A. Dickinson, Matt Firestone, Andy O'Reilly	CBS
2008 (60th)	The 80th Annual Academy Awards		Robert A. Dickinson, Robert Barnhart, Andy O'Reilly	ABC
2008 (60th)	Dancing with the Stars	"510A"	Simon Miles	ABC
2008 (60th)	Late Night with Conan O'Brien	"2518"	Fred Bock	NBC
2008 (60th)	Late Show with David Letterman	"2843"	Steven Brill, Timothy Stephenson	CBS
2009 (61st)
2009 (61st)	American Idol	"Finale"	Kieran Healy, Joshua Hutchings, George Harvey	Fox
2009 (61st)	The 81st Annual Academy Awards		Robert A. Dickinson, Robert Barnhart, Andy O'Reilly	ABC
2009 (61st)	Dancing with the Stars	"702A"	Simon Miles	ABC
2009 (61st)	Jimmy Kimmel Live!	"09-1182"	Christian Hibbard, Matt Ford	ABC
2009 (61st)	Late Show with David Letterman	"3074"	Steven Brill, Timothy Stephenson	CBS
2009 (61st)	Saturday Night Live	"Host: Hugh Laurie"	Geoff Amoral, Rick McGuinness	NBC

=== 2010s ===
Year	Program	Episode	Nominees	Network
2010 (62nd)
2010 (62nd)	Vancouver 2010 Olympic Winter Games Opening Ceremony		Robert A. Dickinson, Ted Wells, Travis M. Hagenbuch	NBC
2010 (62nd)	The 82nd Annual Academy Awards		Robert A. Dickinson, Robert Barnhart, Andy O'Reilly	ABC
2010 (62nd)	Dancing with the Stars	"909A"	Simon Miles	ABC
2010 (62nd)	Saturday Night Live	"Host: Betty White"	Phil Hymes, Geoff Amoral, Rick McGuinness	NBC

Outstanding Lighting Design / Lighting Direction for a Variety Series

Year	Program	Episode	Nominees	Network
2011 (63rd)
2011 (63rd)	So You Think You Can Dance	"Season 7 Finale, Part 2"	Robert Barnhart, Matt Firestone, Patrick Boozer, Pete Radice	Fox
2011 (63rd)	American Idol	"Finale"	Kieran Healy, Joshua Hutchings, Matthew McAdam, George Harvey	Fox
2011 (63rd)	Conan	"Love Gets Liposuctioned"	Robert A. Dickinson, Noah Mitz	TBS
2011 (63rd)	Dancing with the Stars	"1204A"	Simon Miles	ABC
2011 (63rd)	Jimmy Kimmel Live!	"Michel Gondry Directs"	Christian Hibbard	ABC
2011 (63rd)	Saturday Night Live	"Host: Justin Timberlake"	Phil Hymes, Geoff Amoral, Rick McGuinness	NBC
2012 (64th)
2012 (64th)	So You Think You Can Dance	"Season 8 Finale"	Robert Barnhart, Matt Firestone, Patrick Boozer, Pete Radice	Fox
2012 (64th)	American Idol	"Finale"	Kieran Healy, Joshua Hutchings, Matthew McAdam, George Harvey	Fox
2012 (64th)	Dancing with the Stars	"1307"	Simon Miles, Matthew Cotter, Suzanne Sotelo	ABC
2012 (64th)	Saturday Night Live	"Host: Jimmy Fallon"	Phil Hymes, Geoff Amoral, Rick McGuinness	NBC
2012 (64th)	The Voice	"Live Shows, Part 1"	Oscar Dominguez, Daniel Boland	NBC
2013 (65th)
2013 (65th)	The Voice	"Live Final Performances (Season 3)"	Oscar Dominguez, Samuel Barker, Daniel K. Boland, Craig Housenick	NBC
2013 (65th)	American Idol	"Finale"	Kieran Healy, Joshua Hutchings	Fox
2013 (65th)	Dancing with the Stars	"1605"	Simon Miles, Matthew Cotter, Suzanne Sotelo	ABC
2013 (65th)	Saturday Night Live	"Host: Martin Short"	Phil Hymes, Geoff Amoral, Rick McGuinness	NBC
2013 (65th)	So You Think You Can Dance	"Season 9 Finale"	Robert Barnhart, Matt Firestone, Patrick Boozer, Pete Radice	Fox
2014 (66th)
2014 (66th)	Dancing with the Stars	"1711A"	Simon Miles, Matthew Cotter, Suzanne Sotelo	ABC
2014 (66th)	America's Got Talent	"826"	Joshua Hutchings, Harry Sangmeister, Lorne MacDougall	NBC
2014 (66th)	Saturday Night Live	"Host: Jimmy Fallon"	Phil Hymes, Geoff Amoral, Rick McGuinness	NBC
2014 (66th)	The Tonight Show Starring Jimmy Fallon	"Episode 1 (Will Smith/U2)"	Fred Bock, Phil Hymes, Jared Kirchmer, Francis Biancamano, Mike Baldassari	NBC
2014 (66th)	The Voice	"619A"	Oscar Dominguez, Samuel Barker, Craig Housenick, Daniel Boland, Johnny Bradley	NBC
2015 (67th)
2015 (67th)	The Voice	"818A"	Oscar Dominguez, Samuel Barker, Daniel K. Boland, Craig Housenick, Johnny Bradley	NBC
2015 (67th)	American Idol	"Finale"	Kieran Healy, Harry Sangmeister, George Harvey, Harrison Lippman	Fox
2015 (67th)	Dancing with the Stars	"1911A"	Simon Miles, Matthew Cotter, Suzanne Sotelo	ABC
2015 (67th)	Late Show with David Letterman	"4190"	Steven Brill, Timothy Stephenson	CBS
2015 (67th)	Saturday Night Live	"Host: Amy Adams"	Phil Hymes, Geoff Amoral, Rick McGuinness	NBC
2015 (67th)	So You Think You Can Dance	"Season 11 Finale"	Robert Barnhart, Matt Firestone, Patrick Boozer, Pete Radice	Fox
2016 (68th)
2016 (68th)	The Voice	"917A"	Oscar Dominguez, Samuel Barker, Daniel K. Boland, Craig Housenick, Johnny Bradley	NBC
2016 (68th)	American Idol	"Finale"	Kieran Healy, Harry Sangmeister, George Harvey, Harrison Lippman	Fox
2016 (68th)	Dancing with the Stars	"The Finals, Part 2"	Simon Miles, Matthew Cotter, Suzanne Sotelo	ABC
2016 (68th)	Saturday Night Live	"Hosts: Tina Fey & Amy Poehler"	Phil Hymes, Geoff Amoral, Rick McGuinness	NBC
2016 (68th)	So You Think You Can Dance	"Season 12 Finale"	Robert Barnhart, Matt Firestone, Patrick Boozer, Pete Radice	Fox
2017 (69th)
2017 (69th)	Dancing with the Stars	"Cirque Du Soleil Night"	Simon Miles, Matthew Cotter, Suzanne Sotelo, Matt McAdam	ABC
2017 (69th)	America's Got Talent	"1120"	Noah Mitz, Ryan Tanker, Mike Berger, Andrew Webberley, Matthew Benson	NBC
2017 (69th)	Saturday Night Live	"Host: Jimmy Fallon"	Phil Hymes, Geoff Amoral, Rick McGuinness	NBC
2017 (69th)	So You Think You Can Dance	"Finale"	Robert Barnhart, Matt Firestone, Patrick Boozer, Pete Radice	Fox
2017 (69th)	The Voice	"Live Finale, Part 2"	Oscar Dominguez, Samuel Barker, Daniel K. Boland, Johnny Bradley	NBC
2018 (70th)
2018 (70th)	Saturday Night Live	"Host: Kevin Hart"	Phil Hymes, Geoff Amoral, Rick McGuinness	NBC
2018 (70th)	America's Got Talent	"The Finals"	Noah Mitz, Ryan Tanker, Mike Berger, Charles Dabezies, Matthew Benson	NBC
2018 (70th)	Dancing with the Stars	"Halloween Night"	Simon Miles, Matthew Cotter, Suzanne Sotelo, Matt McAdam	ABC
2018 (70th)	So You Think You Can Dance	"Finale"	Robert Barnhart, Matt Firestone, Patrick Boozer, Pete Radice, Madigan Stehly	Fox
2018 (70th)	The Voice	"Live Finale, Part 1"	Oscar Dominguez, Daniel Boland, Craig Housenick, Johnny Bradley, Ronald Wirsgalla	NBC
2019 (71st)
2019 (71st)	Saturday Night Live	"Host: John Mulaney"	Rick McGuinness, Geoff Amoral, William McGuinness, Trevor Brown, Tim Stasse	NBC
2019 (71st)	America's Got Talent	"Semi Final #1 Performance Show"	Noah Mitz, Mike Berger, Will Gossett, Ryan Tanker, Matthew Benson, Andrew Webberley	NBC
2019 (71st)	Dancing with the Stars	"Semi-Finals"	Simon Miles, Suzanne Sotelo, Pete Radice, Matt McAdam	ABC
2019 (71st)	So You Think You Can Dance	"Finale"	Robert Barnhart, Patrick Boozer, Pete Radice, Madigan Stehly, Matt Firestone	Fox
2019 (71st)	The Voice	"Live Finale, Part 1"	Oscar Dominguez, Daniel Boland, Craig Housenick, Ronald Wirsgalla, Johnny Bradley	NBC

=== 2020s ===
Year	Program	Episode	Nominees	Network
2020 (72nd)
2020 (72nd)	Saturday Night Live	"Host: John Mulaney"	Rick McGuinness, Geoff Amoral, William McGuinness, Trevor Brown, Tim Stasse	NBC
2020 (72nd)	America's Got Talent	"Live Results Finale"	Noah Mitz, Michael Berger, William Gossett, Ryan Tanker, Matt Benson, Scott Chmielewski, Patrick Brazil	NBC
2020 (72nd)	Jimmy Kimmel Live!	"Jimmy Kimmel Live in Brooklyn"	Christian Hibbard, Bill Peets, Kille Knobel, James Worman	ABC
2020 (72nd)	So You Think You Can Dance	"Finale"	Robert Barnhart, Patrick Boozer, Pete Radice, Madigan Stehly, Matt Firestone	Fox
2020 (72nd)	The Voice	"Live Finale"	Oscar Dominguez, Daniel Boland, Craig Housenick, Samuel Barker, Johnny Bradley	NBC
2021 (73rd)
2021 (73rd)	Saturday Night Live	"Host: Adele"	Geoffrey Amoral, Richard McGuinness, William McGuinness, Trevor Brown, Tim Stasse	NBC
2021 (73rd)	America's Got Talent	"The Finals"	Noah Mitz, Michael Berger, William Gossett, Matt Benson, Ryan Tanker, Patrick Brazil, Patrick Boozer, Scott Chmielewski	NBC
2021 (73rd)	Dancing with the Stars	"Finale"	Tom Sutherland, Joe Holdman, Alexander Taylor, Nathan Files, Matt McAdam	ABC
2021 (73rd)	The Masked Singer	"The Spicy 6 - The Competition Heats Up!"	Simon Miles, Cory Fournier, Maurice Dupleasis	Fox
2021 (73rd)	The Voice	"Live Top 17 Performances"	Oscar Dominguez, Ronald Wirsgalla, Andrew Munie, Daniel K. Boland, Tiffany Spicer Keys	NBC
2022 (74th)
2022 (74th)	The Voice	"Live Finale"	Oscar Dominguez, Samuel Barker, Ronald K. Wirsgalla, Daniel K. Boland, Erin Anderson, Andrew Munie	NBC
2022 (74th)	America's Got Talent	"Finale Results"	Noah Mitz, Michael Berger, William Gossett, Ryan Tanker, Matt Benson, Patrick Brazil, Scott Chmielewski	NBC
2022 (74th)	American Song Contest	"Semi-Final #1"	Noah Mitz, William Gossett, Patrick Brazil, Rob Koenig, Matt Benson, Darien Koop, Matthew Cotter	NBC
2022 (74th)	Dancing with the Stars	"Finale"	Tom Sutherland, Joe Holdman, Nate Files, Matt McAdam	ABC
2022 (74th)	The Masked Singer	"Group A Semi-Final"	Simon Miles, Cory Fournier	Fox
2023 (75th)
2023 (75th)	Dancing with the Stars	"Semi Finals"	Noah Mitz, Michael Berger, Patrick Brazil, Andrew Law, Matt Benson, Matt McAdam, Luke Chantrell	Disney+
2023 (75th)	America's Got Talent	"Episode 1717"	Noah Mitz, Will Gossett, Ryan Tanker, Patrick Brazil, Jay Koch, Matt Benson, Scott Chmielewski, Kevin Faust	NBC
2023 (75th)	American Idol	"Top 20"	Tom Sutherland, Bobby Grey, Nathan Files, James Coldicott, Hunter Selby, Scott Chmielewski, Luke Chantrell, Ed Moore	ABC
2023 (75th)	So You Think You Can Dance	"Starry Starry Night"	Robert Barnhart, Matt Firestone, Pete Radice, Patrick Boozer, Jeff Behm, Christopher Gray	Fox
2023 (75th)	The Voice	"Live Finale, Part 2"	Oscar Dominguez, Ronald Wirsgalla, Erin Anderson, Andrew Munie, Jeff Shood, Daniel Boland, Terrance Ho	NBC
2024 (76th)
2024 (76th)	Saturday Night Live	"Host: Kristen Wiig"	Geoffrey Amoral, Rick McGuinness, Trevor Brown, Tim Stasse, William McGuinness, Frank Grisanti	NBC
2024 (76th)	America's Got Talent	"Episode 1818"	Noah Mitz, Will Gossett, Hannah Kerman, Ryan Tanker, Patrick Boozer, Matt Benson, Terrance Ho, Scott Chmielewski	NBC
2024 (76th)	American Idol	"Top 14 Reveal"	Tom Sutherland, James Coldicott, Nathan Files, Bobby Grey, Ed Moore, Luke Chantrell, Scott Chmielewski	ABC
2024 (76th)	Dancing with the Stars	"Semi-Finals"	Noah Mitz, Patrick Brazil, Andrew Law, Casey Rhodes, Hannah Kerman, Matt Benson, Ed Moore, Stu Wesolik, Matt McAdam	ABC
2024 (76th)	The Late Show with Stephen Colbert	"May 21, 2024"	Michael Scricca, Hillary Knox, Constantine Leonardos II, Tom Carrol	CBS
2024 (76th)	The Voice	"Live Finale, Part 2"	Oscar Dominguez, Dan Boland, Ronald Wirsgalla, Erin Anderson, Andrew Munie, Jeff Shood, Terrance Ho	NBC
2025 (77th)
2025 (77th)	Saturday Night Live	"Host: Lady Gaga"	Geoffrey Amoral, Rick McGuinness, William McGuinness, Trevor Brown, Tim Stasse, Frank Grisanti, Reginald Campbell	NBC
2025 (77th)	American Idol	"Songs of Faith"	Tom Sutherland, James Coldicott, Hunter Selby, Andrew Law, Nathan Files, Chris Roseli, Matt McAdam, Luke Chantrell, Ed Moore	ABC
2025 (77th)	Dancing with the Stars	"Semi-Finals"	Noah Mitz, Madigan Stehly, Patrick Brazil, Joe Holdman, Hannah Kerman, Will Gossett, Matt Benson, Matt McAdam, Ed Moore, Kevin Faust	ABC
2025 (77th)	RuPaul's Drag Race	"The Wicked Wiz of Oz: The Rusical!"	Gus Dominguez, Thomas Schneider, Darren Barrows, Steve Moreno	MTV
2025 (77th)	The Voice	"Live Finale, Part 1"	Oscar Dominguez, Ronald Wirsgalla, Erin Anderson, Vanessa Arciga, Andrew Munie, Jeff Shood, Terrance Ho	NBC
2026 (78th)
2026 (78th)	The Late Show with Stephen Colbert	"Guests: Bruce Springsteen, Special Surprise Guests"	Michael Scricca, Hillary Knox, Constantine Leonardos II, Tom Carroll	CBS
2026 (78th)	Dancing with the Stars	"20th Birthday Party"	Noah Mitz, Madigan Stehly, Hannah Kerman, Will Gossett, Patrick Brazil, Joe Holdman, Matt Benson, Matt McAdam, Alan Pineda, Kevin Faust	ABC
2026 (78th)	Jimmy Kimmel Live!	"Guests: Stephen Colbert, Seth Meyers, Kumail Nanjiani, Josh Meyers, and Musical Guest Reneé Rapp"	Craig Housenick, Darien Koop, James Worman, Ruben Escobar, Guy Jones	ABC
2026 (78th)	Saturday Night Live	"Host: Ariana Grande"	Geoffrey Amoral, Rick McGuinness, Trevor Brown, Tim Stasse, William McGuinness, Frank Grisanti, Reginald Campbell	NBC
2026 (78th)	The Voice	"Finale Part 2"	Oscar Dominguez, Johnny Bradley, Ronald K. Wirsgalla, Erin Anderson, Daniel K. Boland, Phillip "Gene" Webber, Andrew Munie, Vanessa Arciga, Jeff Shood, Terrance Ho	NBC

== Programs with multiple awards ==
7 awards

- Home Improvement

6 awards

- Saturday Night Live

4 awards

- The Voice

3 awards

- Dancing with the Stars
- Solid Gold

2 awards

- Growing Pains
- So You Think You Can Dance

== Programs with multiple nominations ==
Totals include nominations for Outstanding Lighting Direction (Electronic) for a Drama Series, Variety Series, Miniseries, Movie or Special.

18 nominations

- Dancing with the Stars

15 nominations

- Saturday Night Live

14 nominations

- American Idol
- The Voice

10 nominations

- So You Think You Can Dance

8 nominations

- America's Got Talent
- Home Improvement

7 nominations

- Night Court

6 nominations

- Late Show with David Letterman
- Who's the Boss?

5 nominations

- The Golden Girls
- Late Night with Conan O'Brien
- Solid Gold

4 nominations

- Jimmy Kimmel Live!
- Sister, Sister

3 nominations

- Growing Pains
- The John Larroquette Show
- Roseanne
- The Tonight Show Starring Johnny Carson
- The Tonight Show with Jay Leno

2 nominations

- Benson
- Family Ties
- The Larry Sanders Show
- The Late Show with Stephen Colbert
- Living Single
- Married... with Children
- The Masked Singer
- Politically Incorrect with Bill Maher
