= Tim Routledge =

British lighting designer and programmer

Tim Routledge is a British lighting designer, creative designer, and lighting director who works in television, music concerts, outdoor events, award shows, and variety shows.

Routledge's recent work as Lighting Designer includes the Eurovision Song Contest 2023, Spice Girls Stadium Tour 2019, Stormzy's headline slot at Glastonbury Festival 2019, Beyonce's Formation World Tour 2016, Sam Smith's Thrill of It All Tour 2018-19, the live studio shows of the 2016/17/18/19 series of The X Factor UK, solo tours and live TV concerts for musician Gary Barlow, Take That, Jeff Lynne's ELO, Royal Blood, Dave, Florence & The Machine, Rita Ora, and Steps.

== Awards ==
In 2024 Tim Routledge won a BAFTA at the British Academy Television Craft Awards for his work on the Eurovision Song Contest 2023. He also won the a Royal Television Society Award for Multi-Camera Lighting for the same project as well as the TPi Lighting Designer of the Year for the fourth time.

In 2013 Routledge was a member of the team that won a Royal Television Society award for the Queen's Diamond Jubilee Concert. In 2013 Routledge and his team were also nominated a BAFTA for the same event.

Along with three other members of the lighting team, Routledge was nominated for an Emmy at the 65th Primetime Emmy Awards, scheduled for 22 September 2013 in Los Angeles, for Outstanding Lighting Design/Lighting Direction for a Variety Special, for their work on the 2012 Summer Olympics opening ceremony. Routledge was nominated as Moving Light Programmer, and the three other nominees for the ceremony are Patrick Woodroffe (Lighting Designer), Adam Bassett (Lighting Director) and Al Gurdon (Director of Photography).

In 2014 Routledge became an Honorary Fellow of the Royal Welsh College of Music & Drama in Cardiff—the university that he originally studied at and graduated from with a degree in Technical Theatre.

In 2009 Routledge won the BAFTA Wales Best Lighting Director award for his work on the Grand Slam live concert celebrating the Welsh rugby team's Six Nations victory.
