= List of awards and nominations received by Roseanne =

Roseanne is an American sitcom that was broadcast on ABC from October 18, 1988 to May 20, 1997. Starring Roseanne Barr, the show revolved around the Conners, an Illinois working-class family. The series reached #1 in the Nielsen ratings becoming the most watched television show in the United States from 1989 to 1990, and remained in the top four for six of its nine seasons, and in the top twenty for eight seasons.

In 1997, the episode "A Stash from the Past" was ranked #21 on TV Guide's 100 Greatest Episodes of All-Time. In 2002, Roseanne was ranked #35 on TV Guide's 50 Greatest TV Shows of All Time.

== American Comedy Awards ==
Year	Category	Nominated work	Result
1989	Funniest Leading Female in a TV Series	Roseanne Barr	Won
1989	Funniest Leading Male in a TV Series	John Goodman	Won
1990	Funniest Leading Female in a TV Series	Roseanne Barr	Nominated
1990	Funniest Leading Male in a TV Series	John Goodman	Won
1991	Funniest Leading Female in a TV Series	Roseanne Barr	Nominated
1991	Funniest Leading Male in a TV Series	John Goodman	Nominated
1992	Funniest Leading Female in a TV Series	Roseanne Barr	Nominated
1992	Funniest Leading Male in a TV Series	John Goodman	Nominated
1993	Funniest Leading Female in a TV Series	Roseanne Barr	Won
1993	Funniest Leading Male in a TV Series	John Goodman	Nominated
1994	Funniest Leading Female in a TV Series	Roseanne Barr	Nominated
1994	Funniest Leading Male in a TV Series	John Goodman	Nominated
1995	Funniest Leading Female in a TV Series	Roseanne Barr	Nominated
1995	Funniest Leading Male in a TV Series	John Goodman	Nominated
1996	Funniest Leading Female in a TV Series	Roseanne Barr	Nominated

== GLAAD Media Awards ==
Year	Category	Nominated work	Result
1992	Outstanding Comedy Series	Roseanne	Won
1993	Outstanding Comedy Series	Roseanne	Won
1995	Outstanding Comedy Series	Roseanne	Won

== Golden Globe Awards ==
Year	Category	Nominated work	Result
1989	Best Television Series – Musical or Comedy	Roseanne	Nominated
1989	Best Actress – Television Series Musical or Comedy	Roseanne Barr	Nominated
1989	Best Actor – Television Series Musical or Comedy	John Goodman	Nominated
1990	Best Actor – Television Series Musical or Comedy	John Goodman	Nominated
1991	Best Actress – Television Series Musical or Comedy	Roseanne Barr	Nominated
1991	Best Actor – Television Series Musical or Comedy	John Goodman	Nominated
1992	Best Actress – Television Series Musical or Comedy	Roseanne Barr	Nominated
1993	Best Television Series – Musical or Comedy	Roseanne	Won
1993	Best Actress – Television Series Musical or Comedy	Roseanne Barr	Won
1993	Best Actor – Television Series Musical or Comedy	John Goodman	Won
1993	Best Supporting Actress – Series, Miniseries or Television Film	Laurie Metcalf	Nominated
1994	Best Television Series – Musical or Comedy	Roseanne	Nominated
1994	Best Actress – Television Series Musical or Comedy	Roseanne Barr	Nominated
1995	Best Supporting Actress – Series, Miniseries or Television Film	Laurie Metcalf	Nominated

== Kids' Choice Awards ==
Year	Category	Nominated work	Result
1992	Favorite Television Actress	Roseanne Barr	Won
1995	Favorite Television Actress	Roseanne Barr	Nominated
1996	Favorite Television Actress	Roseanne Barr	Nominated
1997	Favorite Television Actress	Roseanne Barr	Nominated

== People's Choice Awards ==
Year	Category	Nominated work	Result
1989	Favorite New Television Comedy Program	Roseanne	Won
1990	Favorite Female Television Performer	Roseanne Barr	Won
1990	Favorite All-Around Female Entertainer	Roseanne Barr	Won
1994	Favorite Female Television Performer	Roseanne Barr	Won
1995	Favorite Female Television Performer	Roseanne Barr	Won

== Primetime Emmy Awards ==
Year	Category	Nominated work	Result
1989	Outstanding Lead Actor in a Comedy Series	John Goodman	Nominated
1989	Outstanding Multi-Camera Picture Editing for a Comedy Series	Marco Zappia	Nominated
1989	Outstanding Art Direction for a Series	Garvin Eddy	Nominated
1989	Outstanding Achievement in Music and Lyrics	Dan Foliart, Howard Pearl	Nominated
1990	Outstanding Lead Actor in a Comedy Series	John Goodman	Nominated
1990	Outstanding Lighting Direction for a Comedy Series	Daniel Flannery	Nominated
1991	Outstanding Lead Actor in a Comedy Series	John Goodman	Nominated
1992	Outstanding Lead Actress in a Comedy Series	Roseanne Barr	Nominated
1992	Outstanding Lead Actor in a Comedy Series	John Goodman	Nominated
1992	Outstanding Individual Achievement in Writing for a Comedy Series	Jennifer Heath, Amy Sherman	Nominated
1992	Outstanding Supporting Actress in a Comedy Series	Laurie Metcalf	Won
1993	Outstanding Lead Actress in a Comedy Series	Roseanne Barr	Won
1993	Outstanding Lead Actor in a Comedy Series	John Goodman	Nominated
1993	Outstanding Supporting Actress in a Comedy Series	Laurie Metcalf	Won
1993	Outstanding Supporting Actress in a Comedy Series	Sara Gilbert	Nominated
1993	Outstanding Lighting Direction for a Comedy Series	Daniel Flannery	Nominated
1994	Outstanding Lead Actress in a Comedy Series	Roseanne Barr	Nominated
1994	Outstanding Lead Actor in a Comedy Series	John Goodman	Nominated
1994	Outstanding Supporting Actress in a Comedy Series	Laurie Metcalf	Won
1994	Outstanding Supporting Actress in a Comedy Series	Sara Gilbert	Nominated
1994	Outstanding Lighting Direction for a Comedy Series	Daniel Flannery	Nominated
1995	Outstanding Lead Actress in a Comedy Series	Roseanne Barr	Nominated
1995	Outstanding Lead Actor in a Comedy Series	John Goodman	Nominated
1995	Outstanding Supporting Actress in a Comedy Series	Laurie Metcalf	Nominated
1995	Outstanding Individual Achievement in Hairstyling for a Series	Pixie Schwartz	Nominated
2018	Outstanding Supporting Actress in a Comedy Series	Laurie Metcalf	Nominated
2018	Outstanding Multi-Camera Picture Editing for a Comedy Series	Brian Schnuckel	Nominated

== Screen Actors Guild Awards ==
Year	Category	Nominated work	Result
1995	Outstanding Performance by a Female Actor in a Comedy Series	Roseanne Barr	Nominated
1995	Outstanding Performance by a Male Actor in a Comedy Series	John Goodman	Nominated
