= Al Gurdon =

British broadcast lighting designer

- Born: UK
- Occupation: Lighting designer

Al Gurdon is a British broadcast lighting designer and consultant. He specialises in large scale televised music shows and events including the MTV Awards, the Eurovision Song Contest and the Super Bowl half-time concerts. Gurdon was the Broadcast Lighting Designer for the opening and closing ceremonies of the 2012 London Olympics.

Gurdon has a BA Hons in Film and Photography from the Polytechnic of Central London, now known as the University of Westminster. He has had a long-standing working relationship with television director Hamish Hamilton.

== Awards and nominations ==
Al Gurdon was awarded an Emmy at the 66th Primetime Emmy Awards 2014. He won in the category of Outstanding Lighting Design/Lighting Direction for a Variety Special for the Sochi 2014 Olympic Winter Games Opening Ceremony. He was the Lighting Designer in a team with Peter Canning, Michael Owen and Ross Williams (Lighting Directors).

Along with three other key members of the lighting team, Gurdon was also nominated for an Emmy at the 65th Primetime Emmy Awards, scheduled for 22 September 2013 in Los Angeles, for Outstanding Lighting Design/Lighting Direction for a Variety Special, for their work on the 2012 Summer Olympics opening ceremony. Gurdon was nominated as Director of Photography, and the three other nominees for the ceremony are Patrick Woodroffe (Lighting Designer), Tim Routledge (Moving Light Programmer) and Adam Bassett (Lighting Director).

Gurdon was also nominated for an Emmy in the same category (Outstanding Lighting Design/Lighting Direction for a Variety Special) for the Super Bowl XLVI Halftime Show starring Madonna.
