= The Comedy Get Down =

- Genre: Comedy; Mockumentary
- Created by: Tom Brunelle; Brad Wollack
- Starring: Cedric the Entertainer; Eddie Griffin; D. L. Hughley; George Lopez; Charlie Murphy
- Country of origin: United States
- Original language: English
- No. of seasons: 1
- No. of episodes: 10

Production
- Executive producers: Tom Brunelle; Brad Wollack; Eric Rhone; Stan Lathan; Michael Rotenberg; Kimberly Carver
- Producer: Hal Olofsson
- Cinematography: Tommy Maddox Upshaw
- Running time: 20 minutes
- Production companies: 3 Arts Entertainment; Free 90 Media; BET Productions

Original release
- Network: BET
- Release: October 12 – December 21, 2017

The Comedy Get Down is an American comedy mockumentary television series, created by Tom Brunelle and Brad Wollack, that premiered on October 12, 2017, on BET. The series stars Cedric the Entertainer, Eddie Griffin, D. L. Hughley, George Lopez, and Charlie Murphy in his last role in a television series in his lifetime.

== Premise ==
The Comedy Get Down is described by BET as the "first scripted comedy series about what really happens behind the scenes of a massive stand-up comedy tour featuring five legendary comics – George Lopez, DL Hughley, Cedric the Entertainer, Eddie Griffin and Charlie Murphy. They’re hilarious, insane and unapologetic on stage, but the second they step off is when the real show begins. The storylines are based on actual events that have taken place not only on their wildly successful Comedy Get Down arena tour, but throughout the 25 plus years each has been a nationally headlining comedian. A workplace comedy at its core, the 30 minute, single-camera series explores the personal and professional relationships of these five comic titans as they navigate the challenges of life on the road: seedy venues, racist road managers, pushy wives, angry baby mamas, obsessive fans, demanding celebrities, shady politicians and more."

== Cast and characters ==
=== Main ===
- Cedric the Entertainer as himself
- Eddie Griffin as himself
- D. L. Hughley as himself
- George Lopez as himself
- Charlie Murphy as himself

=== Recurring ===
- Tawny Newsome as Nina
- Steve Berg as White Terry

=== Guest ===
- Ice Cube as himself
- Dale Godboldo as Mr. Randall
- Eric Dickerson as himself
- Aloma Wright as Aunt Caldonia
- Kareem Abdul-Jabbar as himself

== Episodes ==
No.	Title	Directed by	Written by	Original release date	US viewers (millions)
1	"N-Words with Friends"	Stan Lathan	David Bickel	October 12, 2017	0.314
The guys must curb their use of the n-word during the stand-up sets or risk losing the corporate sponsorship for their tour. Meanwhile, White Terry struggles to get Charlie a razzleberry pie from The Pussycat Pie Factory.
2	"Get Off the Bus"	Stan Lathan	Grant Dekernion	October 19, 2017	0.222
Nina arranges for a tour bus to take the guys to their next tour stop as a means of bonding. They stop at a diner chain and befriend a couple of members of the Cincinnati Bengals whose drunken behavior starts to draw the wrong kind of attention. Meanwhile, Eddie refuses to ride the bus due to past trauma and instead embarks on a car ride with White Terry. The duo end up at a meeting of conspiracy theorists where D.L. gives a speech.
3	"No Good Weed"	Stan Lathan	Alyson Fouse	October 26, 2017	0.243
After pledging a donation to a charity, Cedric is honored at a dinner and Eddie and George tag along. He soon becomes aware, however, that his donation of $10,000 is actually for $100,000. Meanwhile, D.L. spends the day with a Make-A-Wish teen who is a big fan but the kid ends up spending most of the day mocking him.
4	"No Tickets, No Peace"	Stan Lathan	Tash Gray	November 2, 2017	0.231
D.L. and George anger various advocacy groups over comments that they have made.Nina informs the guys that Twitter is blowing up because of some things DL and George said that got them in trouble with a gay rights group. Meanwhile, Cedric offers football player Eric Dickerson free tickets to the show in Dallas, expecting to have the favor returned with tickets to a football game.
5	"Black Wives Matter"	Henry Chan	Emilia Serrano	November 9, 2017	0.196
6	"Unsuitable"	Henry Chan	Brendan Clifford	November 16, 2017	0.210
7	"Weekend at Eddie's"	Stan Lathan	David Bickel	November 30, 2017	0.172
8	"Shirts and Skin"	Stan Lathan	Malik Sanon	December 7, 2017	0.222
9	"LA Story Part 1"	Stan Lathan	Tom Brunelle & Brad Wollack	December 14, 2017	0.292
10	"LA Story Part 2"	Stan Lathan	Tom Brunelle & Brad Wollack	December 21, 2017	0.274

== Production ==
=== Development ===
On April 20, 2016, it was announced that BET had given the production a series order for a first season consisting of ten episodes. Executive producers were set to include Tom Brunelle, Brad Wollack, Michael Rotenberg, Greg Walter, Kimberly Carver, and Eric C. Rhone. Production companies involved with the series were reported to include 3 Arts Entertainment and Free 90 Media.

=== Casting ===
Alongside the announcement of the series order, it was announced that main cast would include Cedric the Entertainer, Eddie Griffin, D. L. Hughley, George Lopez, and Charlie Murphy playing fictional versions of themselves. On August 8, 2016, it was announced that Tawny Newsome had been cast in a supporting role.
