= Charlie Murphy (actor) =

American comedian and actor (1959–2017)

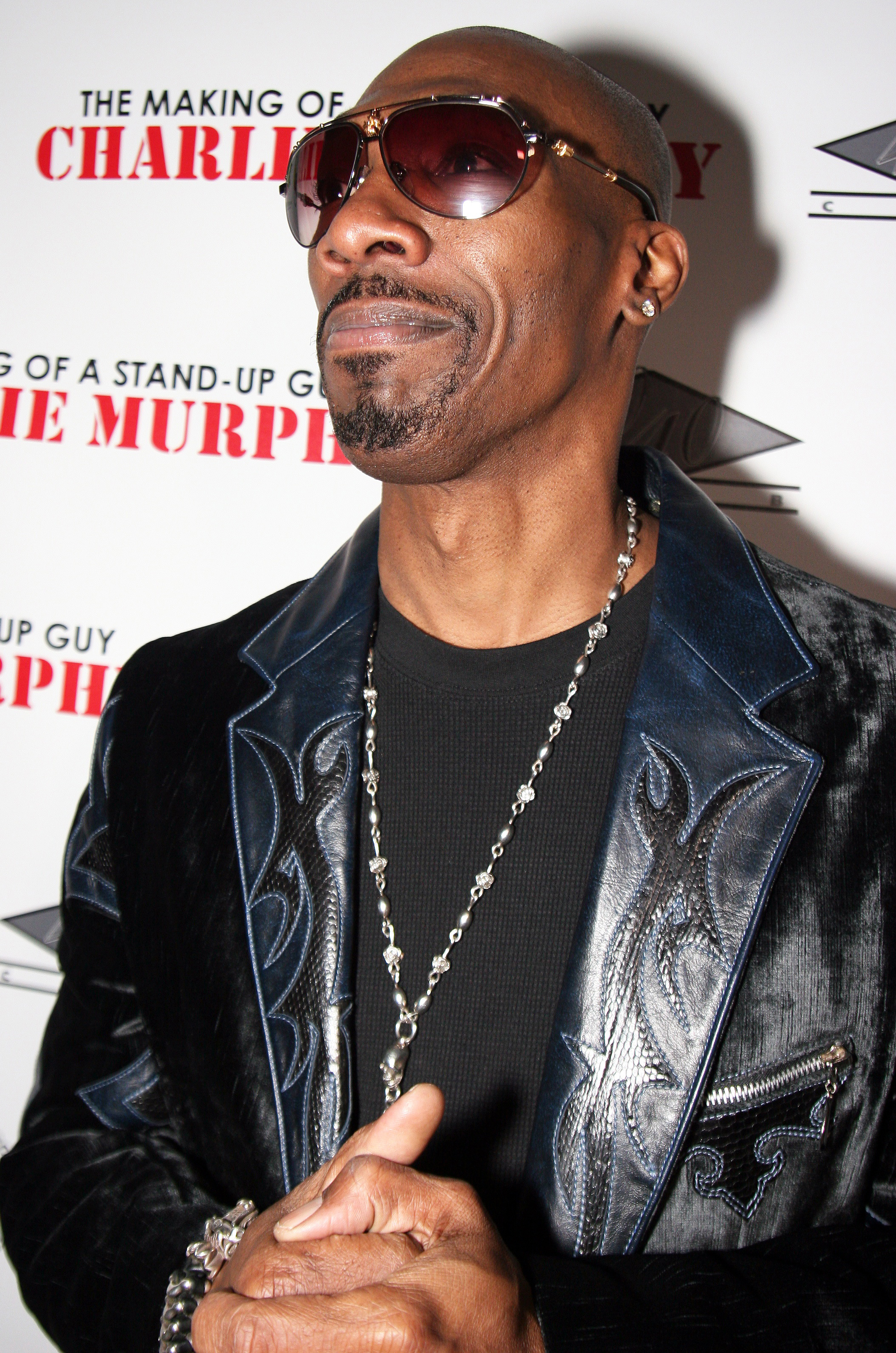
- Murphy in 2009
- Born: Charles Quinton Murphy; July 12, 1959; Brooklyn, New York, U.S.
- Died: April 12, 2017 (aged 57); New York City, U.S.
- Spouse: Tisha Taylor (m. 1997; died 2009)
- Children: 3
- Relatives: Eddie Murphy (brother)

Comedy career
- Years active: 1980–2016
- Medium: Stand-up; film; television
- Genres: Observational comedy; physical comedy; surreal humor
- Subjects: Everyday life; popular culture; politics; celebrities

Charles Quinton Murphy (July 12, 1959 – April 12, 2017) was an American stand-up comedian, and actor. He was best known as a writer and cast member of the Comedy Central sketch-comedy series Chappelle's Show, and a co-star of the sitcom Black Jesus. He was the older brother of actor and comedian Eddie Murphy.

== Early life ==
Murphy was born on July 12, 1959, in Brooklyn, New York. His mother Lillian Murphy was a telephone operator and his father, Charles Edward Murphy, was a transit police officer, actor, and comedian.

As an adolescent, Murphy spent ten months in jail. In 1978, on the day of his release, he enlisted in the United States Navy and served for six years as a boiler technician.

== Career ==
Murphy made his first film appearance in the 1970 comedy-drama film The Landlord. The film was shot in a neighborhood where Murphy lived and he appears in a brief scene as a boy stealing Beau Bridges's hubcaps. Murphy had minor roles in several films in the late 1980s and early 1990s and worked behind the scenes with hip hop group K-9 Posse, a duo composed of his half-brother Vernon Lynch Jr. and Wardell Mahone. On their 1988 self-titled debut, Murphy was credited as the album's executive producer as well as songwriter on "Somebody's Brother" and "Say Who Say What." He also made an appearance in the video for the duo's first single, "This Beat Is Military." Murphy's first major role in a motion picture was in the 1993 film CB4, playing the antagonist Gusto.

Murphy gained national attention as a recurring performer on Chappelle's Show, particularly in the Charlie Murphy's True Hollywood Stories sketches. In these, Murphy recounts his misadventures as part of his brother's entourage, including encounters with various celebrities such as Rick James and Prince. After Chappelle's Show host Dave Chappelle left the show, Murphy and Donnell Rawlings hosted the "lost episodes" compiled from sketches produced before his departure.

In 2005, he appeared in King's Ransom (alongside Anthony Anderson and Jay Mohr). In the film, Murphy portrayed Herb, a gay ex-con who is hired by King (Anderson) to fake his kidnapping. Murphy also did voiceovers for Budweiser radio commercials, provided the voice for Iraq War veteran/criminal Ed Wuncler III on Cartoon Network's Adult Swim series The Boondocks, and the voice for a pimp named Jizzy-B in Grand Theft Auto: San Andreas and as an albino Black graffiti artist named White Mike in Marc Ecko's Getting Up: Contents Under Pressure. Murphy provided the voice for Spock on the G4TV's Star Trek 2.0 shorts, and the dog Lloyd in his younger brother Eddie's 2007 film, Norbit (which Murphy also co-created the story and co-wrote the screenplay for).

On March 20, 2009, he began his own sketch comedy series Charlie Murphy's Crash Comedy on Crackle. A stand-up special, Charlie Murphy: I Will Not Apologize premiered on Comedy Central in late February 2010. Murphy also made special appearances in 1000 Ways to Die and the TBS sitcom Are We There Yet? as Frank Kingston. In 2014–15, Murphy played Vic on the Adult Swim live-action show Black Jesus.

== Personal life and death ==
Murphy was a resident of Tewksbury Township, New Jersey. He was married to Tisha Taylor Murphy from 1997 until her death from cervical cancer in December 2009. The couple had two children together, and Murphy had a child from a previous relationship. He was a karate practitioner.

Murphy died from leukemia on April 12, 2017, at age 57 in New York City, New York.

The third-season premiere of Black Jesus and his brother's film, Dolemite Is My Name, were dedicated to Murphy. Murphy was the one who piqued his brother's interest in the biopic's subject, Rudy Ray Moore.

== Filmography ==
=== Film ===
Year	Title	Role	Notes
1989	Harlem Nights	Jimmy The Muffin Man	
1990	Mo' Better Blues	Eggy	
1991	Jungle Fever	Livin' Large	
1993	CB4	Gusto	
1996	The Pompatus of Love	Saxophone Man	
1998	The Players Club	Brooklyn	
1999	Unconditional Love	Detective	
2002	Paper Soldiers	Johnson	Also writer
2003	Death of a Dynasty	Dick James/Dukey Man/Sock Head	
2005	Lovesick	Damian	
2005	King's Ransom	Herb Clarke	
2005	Roll Bounce	Victor	
2006	Night at the Museum	Taxi Driver	Cameo
2007	Three Days to Vegas	Andre	
2007	Mattie Fresno and the Holoflux Universe	Griss	
2007	Norbit	Lloyd the Dog	Voice cameo; Also screen and story writer
2007	Unearthed	Hank	
2007	Twisted Fortune	Angel Robbins	
2007	Universal Remote	Various	
2007	The Perfect Holiday	J-Jizzy	
2008	Bar Starz	Clay the Doorman/Arnie	
2008	The Hustle	Junior Walker	
2009	Frankenhood	Franklin	
2010	Our Family Wedding	T.J.	
2010	Lottery Ticket	Semaj	
2012	Moving Day	Cedric	
2016	Meet the Blacks	Key Flo	(Final film role)
2025	Being Eddie	Himself	Documentary, archive footage

=== Television ===
Year	Title	Role	Notes
1990	The Kid Who Loved Christmas		TV movie
1995	Martin	Big Bro	1 episode
1995	Murder was the Case: The Movie	JC	Direct-to-video
2003–2006	Chappelle's Show	Various	14 episodes, also writer
2004	One on One	Senator Larry Eldrige	
2005	Denis Leary's Merry F#%$in' Christmas	Himself	TV special
2005–2010	The Boondocks	Ed Wuncler III (voice)	10 episodes
2006	Thugaboo: Sneaker Madness	Big Kid (voice)	TV movie
2006	Thugaboo: A Miracle on D-Roc's Street	Big Kid (voice)	TV movie
2006	Wild 'n Out	Himself	
2007	Beef IV	Himself/narrator (voice)	Video documentary
2007	We Got to Do Better	Host	Unknown episodes
2007	Pauly Shore's Natural Born Komics	Himself	Direct-to-video
2009	Nite Tales: The Series	Samson	Episode: "Pill Time"
2010	Freaknik: The Musical	Al Sharpton, Perminator (voice)	TV movie
2010	Charlie Murphy: I Will Not Apologize	Himself	Video documentary
2010	Lopez Tonight	Himself	
2010–2012	Are We There Yet?	Frank Kingston	5 episodes
2010	1000 Ways to Die	Himself	Episode: "Today's Menu: Deep Fried Death"
2011	The Cookout 2	Coach Ashmokeem	TV film
2012–2014	Black Dynamite	A Cat Named Rollo (voice)	2 episodes
2013	Hawaii Five-0	Don McKinney	
2014–2015	Black Jesus	Vic	Main cast; 21 episodes
2016	Teenage Mutant Ninja Turtles	Vrax Belebome / Bellybomb (voice)	Episode: "Journey to the Center of Mikey's Mind"
2017	Power	Marshal Clyde Williams	5 episodes
2017	The Comedy Get Down	Himself	Posthumous release; 5 episodes

=== Video games ===
Year	Title	Role	Notes
2004	Grand Theft Auto: San Andreas	Jizzy B.	
2006	Marc Ecko's Getting Up: Contents Under Pressure	White Mike	
2021	Grand Theft Auto: The Trilogy – The Definitive Edition	Jizzy B.	Archival recordings Remaster of Grand Theft Auto: San Andreas only.

=== Music videos ===
Year	Title	Role
1994	Murder Was the Case	JC
