= Lee Rose (lighting designer) =

American lighting designer

- Born: Lee H. Rose; July 20, 1955 (age 70); Cleveland, Ohio
- Known for: Lighting Design

Lee Rose (born July 30, 1955) is an American lighting designer working in such fields as film, television, stage, and concerts.

== Career ==
Lee Rose began his career as a lighting technician and designer in a theatre, working with both stage theatre and dance lighting design. During the mid-1970s, Rose also began working as a lighting designer and technician for rock concerts. His first major concert was the design of the lighting for the band Atlantis Philharmonic, which opened for Styx in 1974. Rose remained on the road for ten years, touring with various groups until 1984. That year, Rose started a TV/film lighting design company called "Ocean, Rose & Associates" with fellow lighting designer Richard Ocean.

=== Television ===
Roses' first work with "Ocean, Rose & Associates" production was the lighting design for the 1st Annual Black Gold Awards in September 1984, produced by Dick Clark Productions. Following their success with this performance, Dick Clark Productions hired the firm to design the lighting for New Years Rockin’ Eve and the Golden Globe Awards. Rose has remained the lighting designer for New Years Rockin' Eve since his debut in 1985, over a span of more than 30 years. During that time Rose has also served as lighting designer for other awards shows including the Golden Gods, the 2011 Daytime Emmy Awards, the American Latino Media Arts Awards, the Clio Awards, and the Soap Opera Digest Awards.

Rose has served as lighting designer for Jerry Lewis Muscular Dystrophy Association (MDA) Labor Day Telethon TV events, as well as contributing to such TV programs as the Disney Channel Games, YAMMA Pit Fighting, Live! With Kelly and Michael, Walt Disney World Christmas Day Parade, We Got to Do Better, Sit Down Comedy with David Steinberg, The Naked Trucker and T-Bones Show, Larry King Live, Last Comic Standing, Greed, Your Big Break, the Keenen Ivory Wayans show, as well as sporting events for the first thirteen official events of the UFC in the mid-1990s. He was also lighting designer on the films Southland Tales, Bringing Down the House, Vanilla Sky, and Almost Famous. His work for the movies Almost Famous and Vanilla Sky, with director of photography John Toll, was covered by American Cinematographer magazine, which praised his lighting design for helping the to bring a feeling of reality to complex indoor scenarios.

Rose has served as lighting director for television broadcasts including Chelsea Lately, Tosh.0, Nick Cannon: Mr. Show Biz, Eddie Griffin: You Can Tell 'Em I Said It!, Dogg After Dark, the Wayne Brady Show, D.C. Follies, and Zoobilee Zoo. He has also served as a cinematographer on television show Christopher Titus: Neverlution.

== Later concerts ==
Rose recorded a concert film of the Phil Collins show at the Royal Albert Hall in 1985. Additional concerts that Rose filmed include Iron Maiden, Jimmy Buffett, The Hooters, Van Halen, American Bandstand, Gloria Estefan, Roy Orbison, and Garth Brooks.

== Honors ==
Rose has been nominated for two Emmy Awards for concert collaborations with Yanni: nomination for "Outstanding Individual Achievement in Lighting Direction (electronic) for a Drama Series, Variety Series, Miniseries, or Movie" in 1994 for his work on Yanni Live at the Acropolis and nomination for "Outstanding Lighting Direction (electronic) for a Drama Series, Variety Series, Miniseries, or Movie" in 1998 for his work on Yannis' Tribute. In 1997, Rose was named Lighting Dimensions' Lighting Designer of the Year.
