= The House at Haunted Hill =

Haunted house theme attraction in Woodland Hills, CA

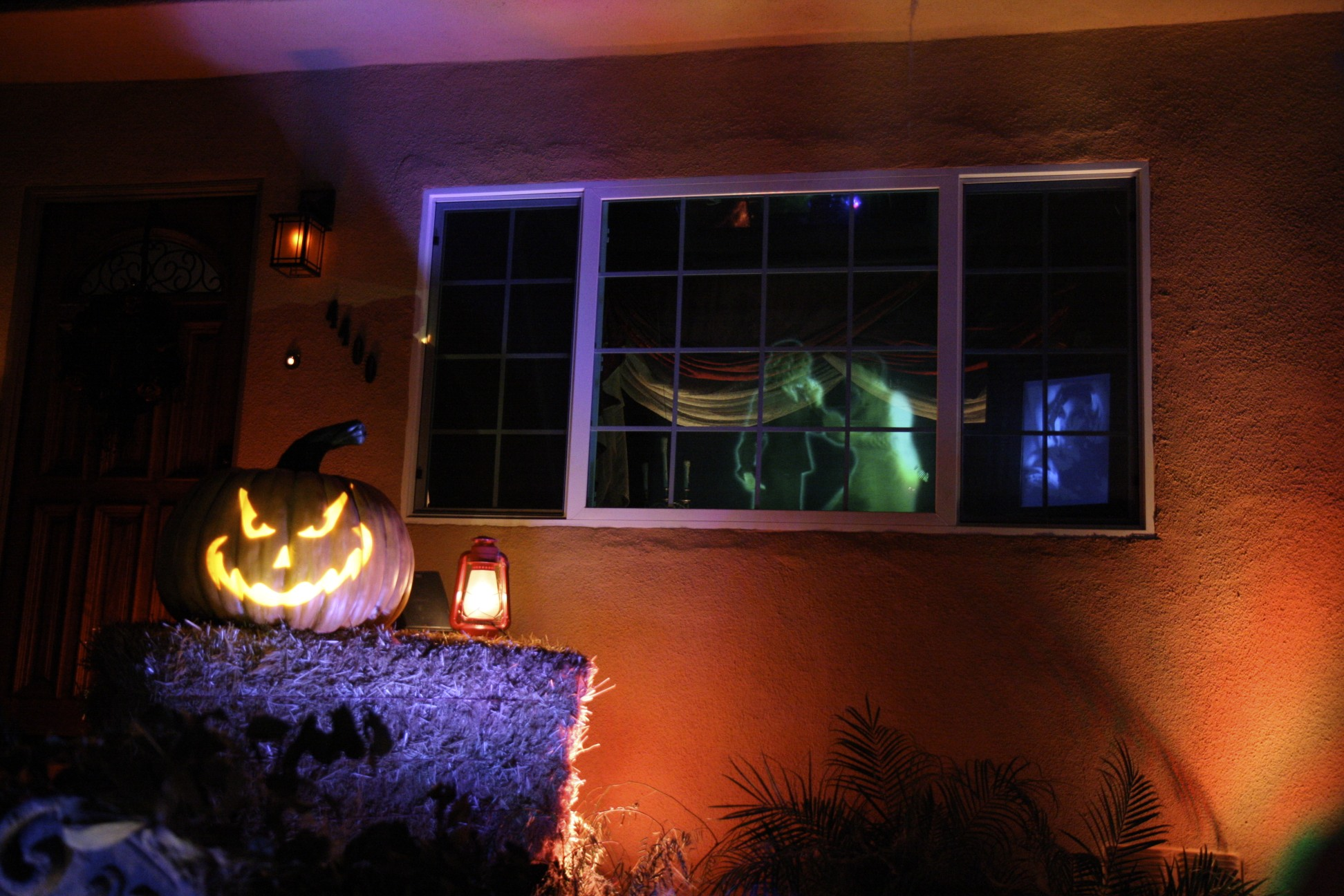
- Jack narrates The House at Haunted Hill.
- Interactive map of The House at Haunted Hill
- Location: Woodland Hills, California
- Coordinates: 34.1496373°N 118.5965743°W
- Opened: October 31, 2000
- Operated by: Matt Ford, Lori Merkle Ford
- Theme: Ghosts
- Operating season: Fall
- Website: Official website

The House at Haunted Hill is a high-tech haunted attraction at a home in Woodland Hills, California. The attraction, technically a yard haunt, showcases a mixture of age-old tricks such as Pepper's ghost, and advanced special effects and multi-channel audio.

== History ==
The show began as a simple yard display of tombstones and a few yard lights. Beginning in 2001, effects similar to The Haunted Mansion ride from Disney appeared in the display along with many Haunted Mansion soundtrack elements. As the attraction proved popular, the show's producers decided to create a unique story.

Lori Merkle Ford created the basic story line in the spring of 2007, which revolved around a young Hollywood starlet of the 1930s who had just married a shady Hollywood screenwriter. Ed Valentine, a prominent television screenwriter, was contracted to develop the script, and pre-production began in full earnest in June 2007. Christopher Hoag, an Emmy-nominated composer, joined the production team shortly thereafter, and about a month later the fully developed score and story were finished.

Corey Burton, famous for his rendition of Paul Frees at The Disney Haunted Mansion, came on board to provide the voice of "Jack", the show's narrator, whose character is manifested as a giant talking pumpkin.

The show was created and produced by Matt Ford, an Emmy-winning lighting designer, and Lori Merkle Ford, a singer, actor and dancer, both based in Los Angeles.

== Attraction ==
The House at Haunted Hill has run yearly since 2000, usually the last three days of October. Unlike most other seasonal haunted attractions, it is a "walk-by" show viewed from along the fence-line of the street. (The city began closing the street to vehicular traffic in 2009 to facilitate the large crowds.) Although it is scripted, it does not use live actors, instead relying on video projections and animatronics. In style, it is a "ghost show" with no shock, blood or gore.

=== Technology ===
The recorded show repeats every 15 minutes, similarly to many amusement park rides. Instead of live actors, it uses high-definition projections of the characters to tell the story, using stage illusions such as the Pepper's ghost effect, and high-tech projection and lighting methods. It is controlled by an Alcorn McBride show control system synchronized to SMPTE timecode. The control system coordinates the motion control subsystems, animatronics, lighting, and special effects. The show also makes extensive use of projection mapping provided by the company Spectral Illusions.

The 24-channel sound track utilizes speakers strategically placed along the attraction. The lighting system is controlled by a Vari Lite Virtuoso and makes extensive use of LED and ultraviolet lighting technology.

== Characters ==
- Jack, the narrator (played by Corey Burton)
- Julietta LaRue, a young Hollywood starlet (played by Heather Marie Marsden)
- Billy Valentine, her new husband (played by Todd Fournier)
- Lily, Billy's deceased ex-wife (played by Lori Merkle Ford)
- Moira, Billy's deceased daughter (played by Alexendra Vicich)
- Snapper Bixby, a Hollywood paparazzo (played by Neil Patrick Harris)
