= Charlie Murphy's Crash Comedy =

- Genre: Sketch comedy
- Created by: Charlie Murphy
- Directed by: Lance Rivera
- Starring: Charlie Murphy; Donnell Rawlings; Freez Luv
- Country of origin: United States
- Original language: English
- No. of seasons: 1
- No. of episodes: 13

Production
- Executive producers: Charlie Murphy; Richard Murphy; Lance Rivera
- Running time: 4 to 5 minutes

Original release
- Network: crackle.com
- Release: March 16 – June 12, 2009

Charlie Murphy's Crash Comedy is a web sketch comedy series of four-to-five-minute episodes, created by Charlie Murphy and consisting of sketches, parodies and infomercials. Crash Comedy is a production of Iron Weeds Productions and is distributed by Sony Pictures Television. Co-starring with Murphy are Donnell Rawlings and Freez Luv. The series premiered on March 16, 2009, on the streaming platform Crackle, with new episodes uploaded each Friday until June 12.

== History ==
Murphy became well known as a comedian after appearing on Chappelle's Show (with his Crash Comedy co-star Donnell Rawlings). One of his sketches, "Charlie Murphy's True Hollywood Stories", involved him telling and acting out stories involving various celebrities. Since Chappelle's Show ended in 2006, Murphy felt like no other sketch show was filling the void, that was left by the show's exit. He believed Crash Comedy would, saying it's "sketch comedy without restrictions."

== Cast ==
- Charlie Murphy
- Donnell Rawlings
- Freez Luv
- Poppy Fields
- Dawn B
- Erika Myers
- Jay Pharoah
- Diane Camino
- Suzy Perez
- Smokey

== Episodes ==
=== Season 1 ===
Title	Original airdate	#
"Charlie & Lil Wayne"	March 20, 2009	1
Murphy interviews "Lil Wayne," played by Jay Pharoah.
"Hood Hold Hairspray"	March 27, 2009	2
The character Billy Mayz introduces Hood Hold Hairspray.
"Airline Security in 20 Years"	April 3, 2009	3
Donnell Rawlings stars in this sketch about the disturbing future of airport security.
