= Robert Dickinson (lighting designer) =

English TV lighting designer (born 1954)

- Born: 25 July 1954 (age 72); London, England
- Occupation: Television lighting designer
- Years active: 1973–present

Robert Dickinson (born 25 July 1954) is an English television lighting designer. His career, spanning decades, has focused on awards shows, music shows, game shows, talk shows, and special events, which make up his more than 1500 on screen television credits. In 1990, Dickinson founded Full Flood, Inc., a consortium of lighting designers and directors of photography for the multi-camera television industry. Dickinson has been involved with many high-profile shows, including the Academy Awards, Grammy Awards, Tony Awards, multiple Super Bowl halftime shows, multiple Olympic games opening ceremonies, the 2010 Shanghai Expo, among other events.

== Biography ==
Dickinson was born in the UK before moving to Canada at the age of two. Shortly thereafter his family moved to Southern California where he remains to this day. Dickinson's break into the industry came when joining IATSE (the International Alliance of Theatrical Stage Employees), which is the union that has jurisdiction over the Motion Picture industry. He quickly moved from working as an lamp operator on films into lighting direction for television, working under industry leader Carl Gibson and eventually working with celebrated lighting designers Bill Klages and Imero Fiorentino. His breakthrough show Solid Gold garnered him his first Emmy win at the age of 29, and was the catalyst that lead to a career in television lighting.

In 2005 Dickinson was awarded an honorary Doctorate of Fine Arts from Carnegie Mellon University.

== Aesthetic ==
Dickinson pioneered the use of moving lights in television lighting design, starting with the 1983 Academy Awards. He is known for his "ceiling of light" approach and the use of floor lights. On key lighting, Dickinson says: "I have a tendency to take risks. I don't key light in a predictable manner; I do it in an appropriate manner. "

== Work of Full Flood ==
=== Large-scale events ===
- Baku 2015 European Games opening ceremony
- Vancouver 2010 Winter Olympic Games opening, closing and medals ceremonies
- Shanghai Expo 2010 opening ceremony
- Five Democratic National Conventions: 2012, 2008, 2004, 2000 and 1996
- Opening Ceremony of the 2007 Special Olympics in Shanghai, China
- Athens 2004 Summer Olympic Games opening and closing ceremonies
- Salt Lake 2002 Winter Olympic Games opening and closing ceremonies
- Atlanta 1996 Summer Olympic Games opening and closing ceremonies

=== Awards Shows ===
- The Academy Awards
- The Grammy Awards
- The Primetime Emmy Awards
- The Daytime Emmy Awards
- The Tony Awards
- The Country Music Association Awards
- The Kids’ Choice Awards
- The American Music Awards
- The Academy of Country Music Awards
- The Golden Globe Awards
- The Billboard Awards
- The Comedy Awards
- The ESPY Awards
- The BET Awards
- The BET Hip Hop Awards
- The NFL Honors
- The Scream Awards
- The Kennedy Center Honors
- The American Film Institute Lifetime Achievement Award

=== Television Specials ===
- The Miss USA Pageant
- The Lincoln Memorial Inaugural Concert at Inauguration 2009: “We Are One”
- An Inauguration Celebration 2009: “The Neighborhood Ball”
- VH1 Divas
- VH1 Rock Honors
- Christmas in Washington
- Five Victoria's Secret Fashion Shows
- Thirteen Super Bowl Halftime Shows featuring such singers and musicians as:

Bruce Springsteen and the E Street Band, Tom Petty and the Heartbreakers, Prince, The Rolling Stones, U2, Aerosmith, ‘N Sync, Britney Spears, Mary J. Blige, Nelly, Stevie Wonder, Gloria Estefan, Big Bad Voodoo Daddy, Savion Glover, Boyz II Men, Smokey Robinson, Martha Reeves, The Temptations, Queen Latifah, The Blues Brothers (Dan Aykroyd, John Goodman and Jim Belushi), ZZ Top, James Brown, Diana Ross, Clint Black, Tanya Tucker, Travis Tritt, The Judds and Michael Jackson

=== Television series ===
- Conan on TBS
- The Ellen DeGeneres Show
- The Tonight Show with Conan O'Brien
- Duets

=== Installation ===
- The Shanghai Corporate Pavilion at Shanghai Expo 2010

=== Concerts and Music Events ===
- James Taylor “One Man Band”
- The Eagles “Hell Freezers Over”
- Harry Connick, Jr. World Tour
- Harry Connick, Jr. Live on Broadway
- Fleetwood Mac “The Dance”
- Celine Dion “These Are Special Times”
- Ricky Martin “One Night Only”
- Jessica Simpson “Tour Of Duty”
- Justin Timberlake “Down Home In Memphis”
- Willie Nelson “Willie and Friends”
- Harry Connick Jr. “Christmas Special”
- ‘N Sync “The Atlantis Concert”
- 'N Sync "‘Ntimate Holiday Special”

=== Live Events Adapted To The Screen ===
- Neil Diamond “Live At Madison Square Garden”
- Shania Twain “Shania Up! Live In Chicago”
- Cher "The Farewell Tour"
- Barbra Streisand's Millennium Concert “Timeless”
- The Backstreet Boys “Larger Than Life”

== Primetime Emmy Awards and Nominations ==
Year	Award	Category	Work	Result
1982	Primetime Emmy Award	Outstanding Lighting Direction (Electronic)	Solid Gold	Nominated
1983	Primetime Emmy Award	Outstanding Lighting Direction (Electronic) For A Limited Series or Special	Solid Gold Christmas Special '82	Nominated
1983	Primetime Emmy Award	Outstanding Lighting Direction (Electronic) For A Series	Solid Gold	Won
1984	Primetime Emmy Award	Outstanding Lighting Direction (Electronic) For A Series	Solid Gold	Won
1985	Primetime Emmy Award	Outstanding Lighting Direction (Electronic) For A Series	Solid Gold	Nominated
1986	Primetime Emmy Award	Outstanding Lighting Direction (Electronic) For A Miniseries Or Special	The 58th Annual Academy Awards	Nominated
1986	Primetime Emmy Award	Outstanding Lighting Direction (Electronic) For A Series	Solid Gold	Won
1987	Primetime Emmy Award	Outstanding Lighting Direction (Electronic) For A Miniseries Or Special	Kraft Salutes the Magic of David Copperfield IX: The Escape From Alcatraz	Nominated
1987	Primetime Emmy Award	Outstanding Lighting Direction (Electronic) For A Miniseries Or Special	Liberty Weekend Closing Ceremonies	Nominated
1989	Primetime Emmy Award	Outstanding Lighting Direction (Electronic) For A Drama Series, Variety Series, Miniseries Or A Special	The Magic of David Copperfield XI: The Explosive Encounter	Won
1991	Primetime Emmy Award	Outstanding Lighting Direction (Electronic) For A Drama Series, Variety Series, Miniseries Or A Special	The Magic of David Copperfield XIII: Mystery On The Orient Express	Won
1992	Primetime Emmy Award	Outstanding Individual Achievement In Lighting Direction (Electronic) For A Drama Series, Variety Series, Miniseries, Or A Special	The Magic of David Copperfield XIV: Flying - Live	Won
1993	Primetime Emmy Award	Outstanding Individual Achievement In Lighting Direction (Electronic) For A Drama Series, Variety Series, Miniseries, Or A Special	The 65th Annual Academy	Nominated
1994	Primetime Emmy Award	Outstanding Individual Achievement In Lighting Direction (Electronic) For A Drama Series, Variety Series, Miniseries, Or A Special	The 66th Annual Academy Awards	Nominated
1995	Primetime Emmy Award	Outstanding Individual Achievement In Lighting Direction (Electronic) For A Drama Series, Variety Series, Miniseries, Or A Special	The Magic of David Copperfield XVI: Unexplained Forces	Won
1996	Primetime Emmy Award	Outstanding Lighting Direction (Electronic) For A Drama Series, Variety Series, Miniseries Or A Special	The 38th Annual Grammy Awards	Nominated
1997	Primetime Emmy Award	Outstanding Lighting Direction (Electronic) For A Drama Series, Variety Series, Miniseries Or A Special	Centennial Olympic Games: Opening Ceremonies	Nominated
1997	Primetime Emmy Award	Outstanding Lighting Direction (Electronic) For A Drama Series, Variety Series, Miniseries Or A Special	The 39th Annual Grammy Awards	Nominated
1998	Primetime Emmy Award	Outstanding Lighting Direction (Electronic) For A Drama Series, Variety Series, Miniseries, Movie	Fleetwood Mac The Dance	Nominated
1998	Primetime Emmy Award	Outstanding Lighting Direction (Electronic) For A Drama Series, Variety Series, Miniseries, Movie	The 70th Annual Academy Awards	Won
1999	Primetime Emmy Award	Outstanding Lighting Direction (Electronic) For A Drama Series, Variety Series, Miniseries, Movie	71st Annual Academy Awards	Won
2000	Primetime Emmy Award	Outstanding Lighting Direction (Electronic)	72nd Annual Academy Awards	Nominated
2001	Primetime Emmy Award	Outstanding Lighting Direction (Electronic, Multi-Camera) For Variety, Music Or Comedy Programming	73rd Annual Academy Awards	Nominated
2001	Primetime Emmy Award	Outstanding Lighting Direction (Electronic, Multi-Camera) For Variety, Music Or Comedy Programming	Barbra Streisand: Timeless	Nominated
2002	Primetime Emmy Award	Outstanding Lighting Direction (Electronic, Multi-Camera) For Variety, Music Or Comedy Programming	Opening Ceremony Salt Lake 2002 Olympic Winter Games	Won
2002	Primetime Emmy Award	Outstanding Lighting Direction (Electronic, Multi-Camera) For Variety, Music Or Comedy Programming	The 74th Annual Academy Awards	Nominated
2003	Primetime Emmy Award	Outstanding Lighting Direction (Electronic, Multi-Camera) For Variety, Music Or Comedy Programming	The 75th Annual Academy Awards	Won
2003	Primetime Emmy Award	Outstanding Lighting Direction (Electronic, Multi-Camera) For Variety, Music Or Comedy Programming	Cher - The Farewell Tour	Nominated
2004	Primetime Emmy Award	Outstanding Lighting Direction (Electronic, Multi-Camera) For Variety, Music Or Comedy Programming	The 46th Annual Grammy Awards	Won
2004	Primetime Emmy Award	Outstanding Lighting Direction (Electronic, Multi-Camera) For Variety, Music Or Comedy Programming	The 76th Annual Academy Awards	Nominated
2005	Primetime Emmy Award	Outstanding Lighting Direction (Electronic, Multi-Camera) For Variety, Music Or Comedy Programming	77th Annual Academy Awards	Nominated
2005	Primetime Emmy Award	Outstanding Lighting Direction (Electronic, Multi-Camera) For Variety, Music Or Comedy Programming	The Games of The XXVIII Olympiad - Opening Cerempny	Won
2006	Primetime Emmy Award	Outstanding Lighting Direction (Electronic, Multi-Camera) For Variety, Music Or Comedy Programming	78th Annual Academy Awards	Nominated
2007	Primetime Emmy Award	Outstanding Lighting Direction (Electronic, Multi-Camera) For Variety, Music Or Comedy Programming	79th Annual Academy Awards	Nominated
2007	Primetime Emmy Award	Outstanding Lighting Direction (Electronic, Multi-Camera) For Variety, Music Or Comedy Programming	49th Annual Grammy Awards	Won
2008	Primetime Emmy Award	Outstanding Lighting Direction (Electronic, Multi-Camera) For Variety, Music Or Comedy Programming	80th Annual Academy Awards	Nominated
2008	Primetime Emmy Award	Outstanding Lighting Direction (Electronic, Multi-Camera) For Variety, Music Or Comedy Programming	50th Annual Grammy Awards	Won
2009	Primetime Emmy Award	Outstanding Lighting Direction (Electronic, Multi-Camera) For Variety, Music Or Comedy Programming	81st Annual Academy Awards	Nominated
2010	Primetime Emmy Award	Outstanding Lighting Direction (Electronic, Multi-Camera) For Variety, Music Or Comedy Programming	82nd Annual Academy Awards	Nominated
2010	Primetime Emmy Award	Outstanding Lighting Direction (Electronic, Multi-Camera) For Variety, Music Or Comedy Programming	Vancouver 2010 olympic Winter Games opening ceremony	Won
2011	Primetime Emmy Award	Outstanding Lighting Design: Lighting Direction For A Variety Special	Conan	Nominated
2011	Primetime Emmy Award	Outstanding Lighting Design: Lighting Direction For A Variety Special	83rd Annual Academy Awards	Nominated
2011	Primetime Emmy Award	Outstanding Lighting Design: Lighting Direction For A Variety Special	The 53rd Annual Grammy Awards	Won
2012	Primetime Emmy Award	Outstanding Lighting Design: Lighting Direction For A Variety Special	84th Annual Academy Awards	Nominated
2012	Primetime Emmy Award	Outstanding Lighting Design: Lighting Direction For A Variety Special	The 54th Annual Grammy Awards	Won
2013	Primetime Emmy Award	Outstanding Lighting Design: Lighting Direction For A Variety Special	The 55th Annual Grammy Awards	Nominated
2013	Primetime Emmy Award	Outstanding Lighting Design: Lighting Direction For A Variety Special	The Oscars	Nominated
2014	Primetime Emmy Award	Outstanding Lighting Design: Lighting Direction For A Variety Special	67th Annual Tony Awards	Nominated
2014	Primetime Emmy Award	Outstanding Lighting Design: Lighting Direction For A Variety Special	The 56th Grammy Awards	Nominated
2014	Primetime Emmy Award	Outstanding Lighting Design: Lighting Direction For A Variety Special	The Oscars	Nominated
