= Bill Klages =

American lighting designer (1927–2024)

- Born: May 7, 1927; Long Beach, New York, U.S.
- Died: July 7, 2024 (aged 97); Santa Monica, California, U.S.
- Occupation: Lighting designer

Bill Klages (May 7, 1927 – July 7, 2024) was an American lighting designer. He won seven Primetime Emmy Awards and was nominated for thirteen more in the categories Outstanding Lighting Direction and Outstanding Special Visual Effects. In 2012, he was inducted into the Television Hall of Fame.

Klages died in Santa Monica, California on July 7, 2024, at the age of 97.
