= We Got to Do Better =

- The show's logo from when it was still titled Hot Ghetto Mess.
- Also known as: Hot Ghetto Mess
- Starring: Charlie Murphy
- Country of origin: United States

Production
- Executive producer: Jam Donaldson

Original release
- Network: Black Entertainment Television
- Release: July 25, 2007

We Got to Do Better, originally titled Hot Ghetto Mess, is an American television series on Black Entertainment Television. The show is based on the cult website hotghettomess.com, which satirizes aspects of the African-American working class. Jam Donaldson, creator of the website and lawyer, is the show's executive producer. Charlie Murphy, known for his role on Chappelle's Show, is the show's host. The show's content has been described as "combin[ing] viewer-submitted home videos and BET-produced man-on-the-street interviews that the channel said are intended to challenge and inspire 'viewers to improve themselves and their communities.'"

Although Donaldson has said of Hotghettomess.com that "My mission with this site is to usher in a new era of self-examination", the site has been described as merely an expansive gallery of the worst of hip hop culture. However, BET programming director Reginald Hudlin insisted that the show was not a direct translation of the website, and the show was billed by BET as a tongue-in-cheek social examination of black culture. The show has experienced controversy due to its negative portrayals of African Americans, causing a name change. Despite the name change, it was reported that at least two sponsors withdrew from the show as a result of the surrounding controversy.

== Controversy ==
The show had become controversial, even before its release, for its stereotypical portrayal of African Americans. In this context, it has been unfavorably compared to minstrel shows and the VH1 reality show Flavor of Love. The website on which the show was based has suffered from much of the same controversy, and has resulted in at least one attempted lawsuit. Due to the unreleased show's perceived racial degradation, many blogs and internet petitions called for a boycott of the show.

It was reported that, as a result of the controversy, State Farm Insurance and Home Depot pulled their sponsorship from the show. In truth, neither company ever had intent to purchase advertisements for the show, but did withdraw advertisements from BET.com because of the show. Though BET has defended the show, it decided to change the show's name Hot Ghetto Mess to We Got to Do Better, the tagline of the original website, to clarify the show's intentions. However, the show was still referred to as Hot Ghetto Mess for the first six episodes, which were filmed before the name was changed.

== Response ==
Despite a stronger than expected viewership of 800,000 on the first episode, We Got to Do Better has received generally negative reviews, with most critics complaining that the show is too bland and unfunny, and has a muddled message. The show was described as "racially balanced - and equally unfunny - on all levels" by Nekesa Mumbi Moody of the Associated Press, who also criticized the show's man-on-the-street interviews as inferior to the similar feature on The Tonight Show with Jay Leno. An article in Newsweek called the show a "classist sideshow" and said "Gold teeth, neon wigs and oversize thongs—you call that 'social commentary'?" although it admitted that BET had not screened the show for them. Later, after watching the show, another Newsweek article said "The show is indeed a spectacle, but not quite in the way anyone was expecting. It wasn’t very controversial, funny or interesting." Critic Joanna Weiss described the show as "deathly boring" and stated that "even if you accept the producers’ intentions as sincere, the show suffers in translation from the Internet to TV." Notwithstanding, at least one review was positive, calling We Got to Do Better "a show that was actually teaching something through a little social commentary."

As a response to the controversy surrounding We Got to Do Better, BET plans to add 16 "balanced" shows to the channel by the end of the year.
