= Daniel Flannery =

American artist

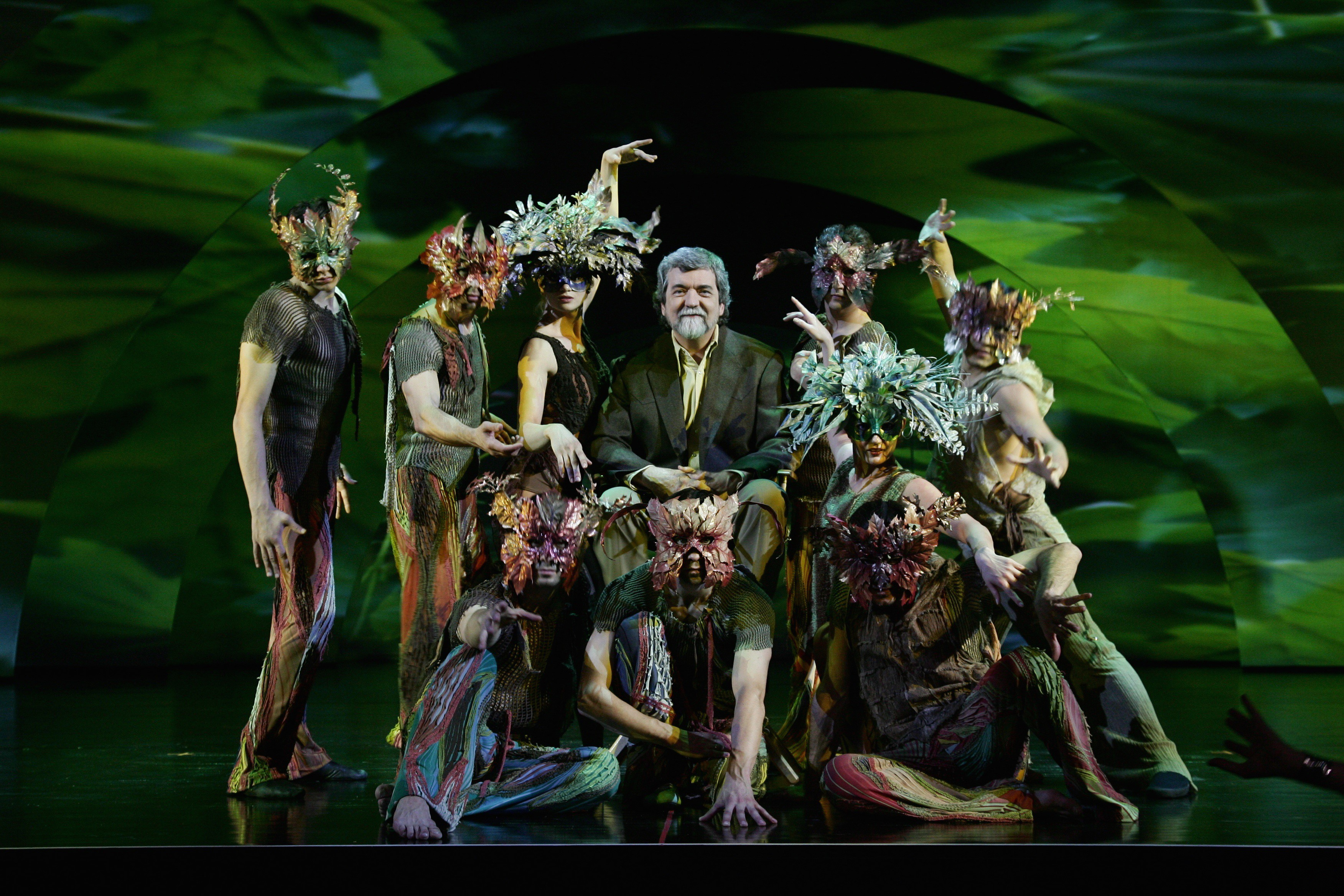
- Flannery with his Elements 'E' Show Cast
- Born: 1952 (age 73–74); Long Island, New York, U.S.
- Occupation: Artist / Director / Producer
- Website: dflannery.com

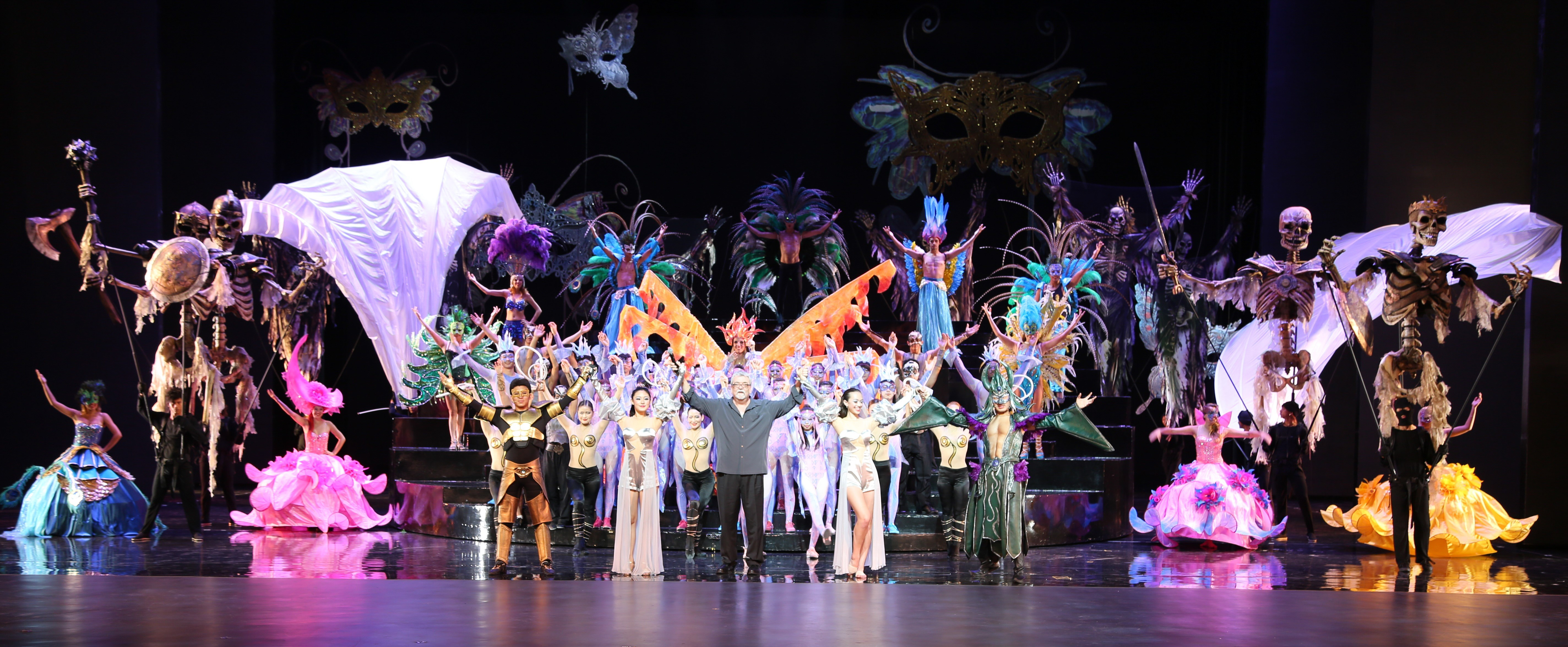
Flannery with his Illusions Cast

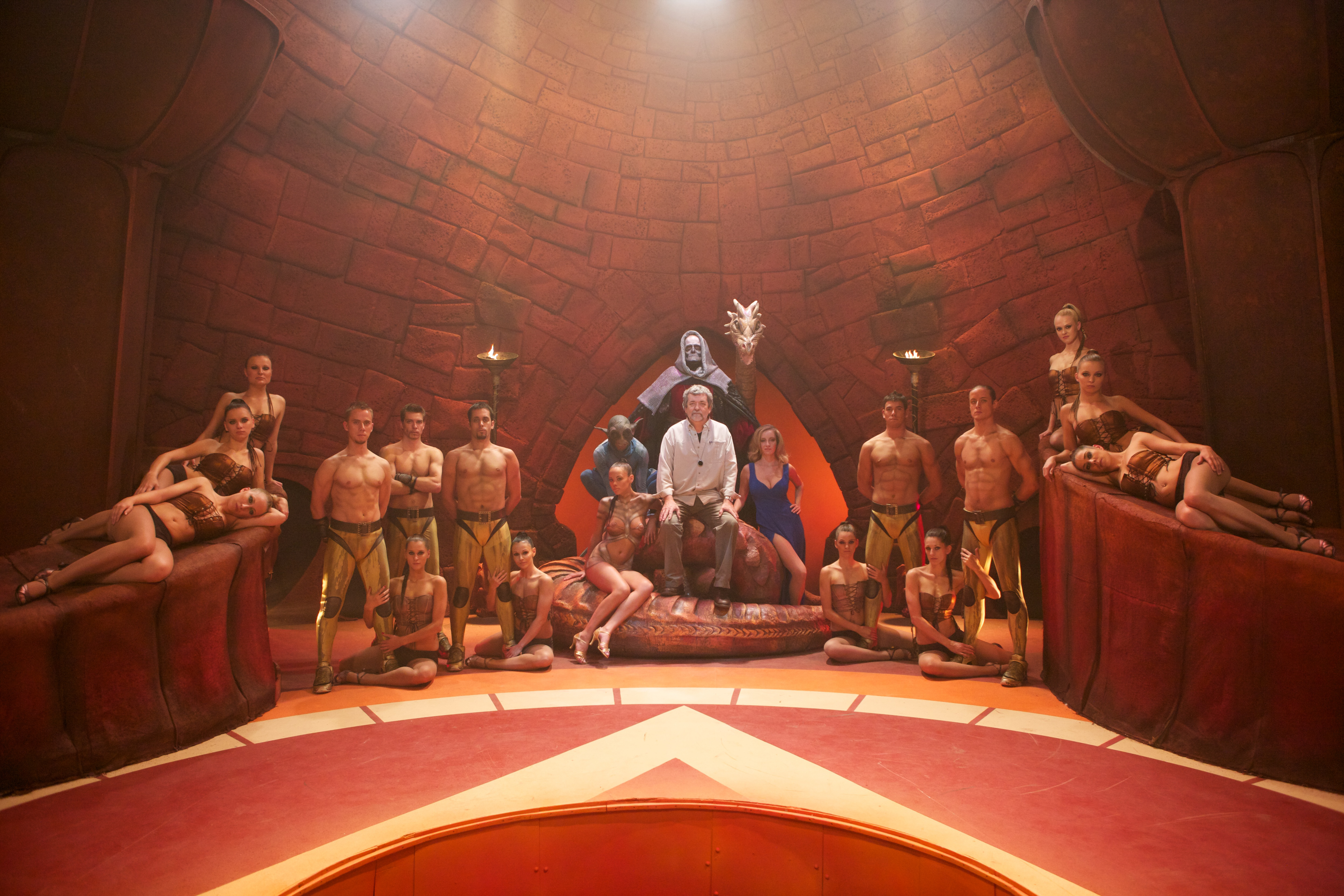
Flannery with his Xayron Cast

Daniel Flannery (born 1952) is an American artist, creative producer, theatre director, scenographer, film/television director, director of photography and lighting designer.

== Career ==
=== Stage spectacles ===
Illusion was a grand opera scale live production show in Changzhou, China. Flannery was commissioned in 2013 to create this show incorporating 3D stereoscopic scenography as a featured element of the show. The stage and house was wrapped with LED walls upon which 3D stereoscopic CGI completed the scenography. The audience wore active 3D glasses and the effect was true immersion. The production featured an international cast of 100 performers.

Flannery directed Xayron in 2010, which was filmed in Budapest.

Overseas Chinese Town Limited engaged Flannery in 2009 to create a western style production show. The show was "E" Elements Show. The production featured a variety of dancers, acrobats, synchronized swimmers, singers, musicians, magicians, and puppets. The show ran for five years at the Huaxia Art Centre in Shenzhen, China.

Flannery collaborated with Oscar Winner, Production Designer Eugenio Zanetti. Together they created Movistar Magica in 2005 which toured throughout Colombia. The tour kicked off with a live broadcast on network television from Bogotá, Colombia. The show was presented in parks and stadiums, featuring 500 performers on a stage that filled a football field.

Maryland celebrated the 350th anniversary of their statehood in 1985. The Department of Tourism for the City of Baltimore commissioned Flannery to collaborate with them to create a theatrical experience on Rash Field at the Inner Harbor for this celebration. Flannery and his team conceived and designed a food and beverage area that consisted of facades based on Maryland's early architecture. The main attraction was a 1200-seat theatre, inspired by tall ships, presenting an original stage production. The show was directed by Flannery and written by Cindy Flannery. The show featured actors portraying the ship's crew with historical paintings and photographs from the Peale Museum projected onto the sails and theatrical illusions.

=== 3D stereoscopic dome films ===
Majid and the Secret of Life is a 3D stereoscopic film presented several times a day in the Dana Dome, a purpose-built theatre at Kahramaa Awareness Centre. Conceived and directed by Flannery the film explores the origins of water on our planet through a young boy's dream journey.

=== World Fairs and World Expos ===
For the Brisbane Australia World Expo 88, Flannery served as associate to Artistic Director John Truscott.

The 1984 Louisiana World Exposition presented an 'Aquacade' in the tradition of Billy Rose's Aquacade. Flannery designed the lighting for this 'Aquacade' attraction.

For the Osaka 1990 World Expo (the international Garden and Greenery Exposition), Flannery created Water Fantasium, the main attraction in the Dairinkai Pavilion. An original theatrical experience with a robotic conductor and an orchestra of water and scenography, it was voted by the Japanese media as the Fair's leading attraction.

In 1993, Flannery created Fantastic Odyssey for the Taejon, South Korea World Expo 93. After the Expo closed the attraction was relocated to a permanent location at Lotte World in Seoul.

=== Television and film ===
In 1978, Flannery relocated to Los Angeles, California and joined the ABC Television Network as Lighting Director. While at ABC he received his first Prime-time Emmy Nomination for his lighting direction of CBS's TV Special Goldie & Liza Together.

Flannery served as Director of Photography on the popular television series Roseanne. His innovative lighting design for the show revolutionized sitcoms and earned him the International Monitor Award, LDI Lighting Designer of the Year, and three Primetime Emmy Award nominations for Outstanding Lighting Direction.

In the realm of feature films, Flannery was theatrical lighting designer on such films as Death Becomes Her, Forrest Gump, and Noises Off.

Year	Title	Role	Genre	Notes
2003	Road to Slamball	Cinematographer	Reality-TV	
2002	Slamball	Cinematographer	TV series	
1998	Reunited	Cinematographer	TV series	3 episodes
1988–1996	Roseanne	Cinematographer and Lighting Designer	TV series	196 episodes, 4 Emmy nominations, LDI Award, International Monitor Award
1994–1995	All-American Girl	Cinematographer	TV series	18 episodes
1994–1995	Me and the Boys	Cinematographer	TV series	8 episodes
1993–1994	Grace Under Fire	Cinematographer	TV series	18 episodes
1994	Forrest Gump	Theatrical Lighting Consultant	Feature Film	
1994	Someone Like Me	Cinematographer	TV series	
1993	Joe's Life	Cinematographer	TV series	11 episodes
1992–1993	Down the Shore	Cinematographer	TV series	25 episodes
1992–1993	Shaky Ground	Cinematographer	TV series	7 episodes
1991–1992	Davis Rules	Cinematographer and Lighting Director	TV series	25 episodes
1992	Death Becomes Her	Theatrical Lighting Consultant	Film	
1992	Noises Off...	Lighting Design Consultant	Film	
1992	Woops!	Cinematographer and Lighting Designer	TV series	
1991	The Man in the Family	Cinematographer	TV series	7 episodes
1991	Baby Talk	Cinematographer	TV series	12 episodes
1990	Carol & Company	Cinematographer	TV series	4 episodes
1989	Chicken Soup	Cinematographer	TV series	
1988	Poison	Cinematographer	TV series	
1987	The Rescue of Pops Ghostly	Lighting Designer	Video game	
1984	1984 Summer Olympics	Ceremonies Special Effects Director	-	
1982	Yesteryear	Cinematographer	TV documentary	
1980	Goldie and Liza Together	Lighting Director	TV special	Emmy nominated
1980	Omnibus	Cinematographer	TV series	2 episodes
1980	Mr. and Mrs. Dracula	Cinematographer	TV series	
1978–1980	Family Feud	Lighting Director	TV series	3 episodes
1977–1978	The Way It Was	Lighting Director	TV series	12 episodes
1971	The Ed Sullivan Show	Lighting Trainee	TV series	3 episodes

=== Themed entertainment ===
WED (now Walt Disney Imagineering) contracted Flannery as a scenographic and lighting design consultant for The American Adventure and Kitchen Kabaret at Epcot.

For Universal Studios Hollywood, Flannery served as lighting designer, conceptualist and scenographer for Universal Studios on such attractions as E.T. Adventure, Kongfrontation, The Adventures of Conan: A Sword and Sorcery Spectacular, and Back to the Future: The Ride. For Universal Studios Florida, he was scenographer and/or lighting designer on E.T. Adventure, King Kong, and Jaws. Flannery was the principal architectural site lighting designer for Universal Studios Florida and Islands of Adventure.

Cosmic Symphony was an attraction Flannery created for Geopolis at the Tokyo Dome. The attraction ran from 1995 to 2007. In 1996, he was principal designer for Adventure Slots in the Hollywood Casino which won the THEA Award for Outstanding Achievement in Themed Entertainment.

Year	Title	Location	Role	Notes
2000	Dome Cinema	Kangwon Land	Producer	
1999-	Islands of Adventure	Orlando, Florida	Principal Architectural Site Lighting Designer	
1998	Son et Lumiere	Philadelphia Historic District	Conceptualist	
1997-	Halloween Horror Nights	Universal Studios Hollywood	Conceived and Directed first original	
1996	Adventure Slots	Hollywood Casino	Principal Designer	THEA Award for Outstanding Achievement in Themed Entertainment
1995–2007	Cosmic Symphony	Tokyo Dome, Geopolis	Conceptualist, Scenographer, and Director	
1993–2007	Back to the Future:The Ride	Universal Studios Hollywood	Conceptualist	
1991–2003	E.T. Adventure	Universal Studios Hollywood	Conceptualist, Scenographer, and Lighting Designer	
1990-	E.T. Adventure	Universal Studios Florida	Scenographer and Lighting Designer	
1990-	Universal Studios Florida	Orlando, Florida	Principal Architectural Site Lighting Designer	1991 Night Beautiful Award for Imaginative Nighttime Lighting Design
1990–2012	Jaws	Universal Studios Florida	Scenographer and Lighting Designer	
1990–2002	King Kong	Universal Studios Florida	Scenographer and Lighting Designer	
1987	Atlantis	Singapore	Conceptualist, Scenographer, and Creative Producer	
1986–2008	Kongfrontation	Universal Studios Hollywood	Conceptualist, Scenographer, and Lighting Designer	
1983–1993	The Adventures of Conan: A Sword and Sorcery Spectacular	Universal Studios Hollywood	Conceptualist, Scenographer, and Lighting Designer	
1982-	The American Adventure	Epcot	Scenographer and Lighting Design Consultant	
1982–1984	Kitchen Kabaret	Epcot	Scenographer and Lighting Design Consultant	
1985	Peppermint Park	Singapore	Conceptualist, Scenographer, and Creative Producer	
1985	Ice Tunnel	Universal Studios Hollywood	Scenographer and Lighting Designer	

=== Visual symphonies ===
In 1977 Flannery was commissioned by the Los Angeles Philharmonic to create the original Star Wars Concert at the Hollywood Bowl. Flannery designed and directed the concert incorporating theatrical lighting, lasers, pyrotechnics and effects. The concert was a landmark event and Flannery began his journey of pioneering "Visual Symphonies", an entirely new concert genre. Flannery collaborated for decades with Maestro Erich Kunzel. Their first endeavor was The Great Symphonic Visual Fantasy in 1978 with the Cleveland Orchestra at the Blossom Music Centre. Together they created Symphantasy – a visual symphony series that was presented annually at the Riverbend Music Center with the Cincinnati Pops Orchestra.

Year	Title	Location	Role	Notes
1989	Symphantasy II	Riverbend Music Center	Conceptualist, Scenographer, and Director	with the Cincinnati Pops and Erich Kunzel
1988	Symphantasy I	Riverbend Music Center	Conceptualist, Scenographer, and Director	with the Cincinnati Pops and Erich Kunzel
1988	Great American Concert	Hollywood Bowl	Conceptualist, Scenographer, and Director	with the LA Philharmonic and Erich Kiunzel
1982	E.T. in Concert	Hollywood Bowl	Conceptualist, Scenographer, and Director	with the LA Philharmonic and John Williams
1978	Great Symphonic Visual Fantasy	Blossom Music Center	Conceptualist, Scenographer, and Director	with the Cleveland Orchestra and Erich Kunzel
1978	Stellar Fantasy	San Francisco Civic Center	Conceptualist, Scenographer, and Director	with the San Jose Symphony and George Cleve
1977	Star Wars Concert	Hollywood Bowl	Conceptualist, Scenographer, and Director	with the LA Philharmonic and Zubin Mehta
	Great Laser & Music Image Concert	Hollywood Bowl	Conceptualist, Scenographer, and Director	with the LA Philharmonic and Michael Tilson Thomas
1988	Cincinnati Pops	Carnegie Hall	Guest Artist (Scenographer)	with Erich Kunzel

=== Olympic ceremonies ===
The LAOOC contracted Flannery as a conceptualist working directly with David Wolper and Tommy Walker on the Closing Ceremonies of the Los Angeles 1984 Summer Olympics. Once the ceremonies were conceived the LAOOC contracted Flannery to direct and his firm to supervise the special effects and special lighting of the closing ceremonies. This included designing the infamous spaceship and alien.

In Universal Studios' bid to produce the ceremonies for the Salt Lake City 2002 Winter Olympic Games, Flannery served as conceptualist and artistic director.

=== Concerts ===
Flannery was a photographer for Neil Diamond's live concert Love at the Greek, recorded at the Greek Theater in 1977.

Flannery was the lighting designer for The Sonny & Cher Concerts, their final years together 1977–1979. He continued to work with Cher as lighting designer on her Black Rose show in 1980.

Also in 1980, Flannery was the special effects consultant for Kenny Loggins' Keep the Fire concert at the Universal Amphitheatre.

Cincinnati Pops appeared at Carnegie Hall in 1988, with conductor Erick Kunzel and guest artist Flannery (Scenographer).

Flannery was lighting designer for the Hollywood Bowl Summer 1992 season.

Flannery directed In the House of Ethel, a 2007 Winter Solstice celebration at the World Financial Center's Winter Garden in New York City. The concert featured magicians Raja & Jarret and poet Harry Smith.

=== Events ===
In 1979 the New Orleans police went on-strike and Mardi Gras was cancelled. City officials worked with State Marshalls which had jurisdiction over the Superdome and working with presenter Blaine Kern and Flannery as director and designer, staged Bacchus Mardi Gras in the Superdome. He returned to the Superdome in 1986 with his associate John Truscott to conceive the 1986 NFL Super Bowl XX Halftime Show.

=== Theater ===
In the early 1970s Flannery began his career as a lighting designer in New York City working on and off Broadway. Credits included Augusta and original plays presented by the Chelsea Theater Centre, Ice Age and The Family Parts 1–4. Flannery also freelanced with Jules Fisher & Assoc.

=== Victorian Arts Centre (Melbourne Arts Centre) ===
From 1980 to 1982 Flannery relocated to Australia to collaborate with two-time Oscar-winning production designer John Truscott as lighting design consultant for the design and building of the Victorian Arts Centre (now the Arts Centre Melbourne).

== Academic career ==
Flannery taught at the University of Southern California, University of California Los Angeles, Art Center College of Design, and State University of New York and the University of California Santa Barbara.

== Affiliations ==
As an active member of numerous guilds, unions and trade organizations, Flannery maintains membership with the Academy of Television Arts & Sciences, Producers Guild, Society of Motion Picture and Television Engineers, International Cinematographers Guild, International Entertainment Buyers Association and United States Institute of Theatre Technology. He served on the executive committee of the Motion Picture and Television Fund for the Golden Boot Awards from 2000 to 2007. He served as President of the Manhattan chapter of Muscular Dystrophy Association from 1972 to 1976.

== Awards and nominations ==
1979–1980 Emmy Nomination for Outstanding Achievement in Lighting Direction, Goldie and Liza Together, CBS

1989 International Monitor Award for Best Lighting Director, Entertainment Series, Roseanne "Nightmare on Elm Street", ABC

1989–1990 Primetime Emmy Nomination for Outstanding Achievement in Lighting Direction, Roseanne "Boo", ABC

1990 Lighting Dimensions International (LDI), Lighting Designer of the Year

1991 Night Beautiful Best of Show, Specialty Lighting, Universal Studios Florida, Imaginative Nighttime lighting Design

1992–1993 Primetime Emmy Nomination for Outstanding Individual Achievement in Lighting Direction, Roseanne, ABC

1993–1994 Primetime Emmy Nomination for Outstanding Individual Achievement in Lighting Direction, Roseanne "White Trash Christmas", ABC

1998 THEA Awards Gala, Award for Outstanding Achievement, Excellence on a Limited Budget, Adventure Slots, Hollywood Casino, Tunica Mississippi

== Personal life ==
Flannery was raised on Long Island, New York. He has resided in New York City, Melbourne, Australia and Los Angeles.

=== Family ===
Flannery was born to Joan and Bartholomew Flannery and has three siblings.

Flannery married Cindy Lawrence in 1980 and together have three children.

In 1992, Flannery married Sharon Takase and together have two children.

== Education ==
While attending a New York high school Flannery began interning with Lighting Director, William Greenfield, at CBS Television on The Ed Sullivan Show from 1968 to 1970.

Flannery is a graduate of the designers' program at Lester Polakov's Studio and Forum of Stage Design in New York City. He attended the Studio on a full scholarship. The school promoted the idea of conceptual-based designing. All the teachers in the school were working professionals and courses included scenic design, scene painting, still-life sketching, mask making, script analysis, costume design and lighting design.

In 1974, he continued his education at Columbia University in the Film Program. There he studied with filmmaker Scott Bartlett. He furthered his theatre studies at HB Studio with Herbert Berghof and Uta Hagen.

== Bibliography ==
- Bacon, Edmund. "Let There Be Light on Our History." The Philadelphia Inquirer, 22 Feb. 1994.
- Charles, Laura. "A Village Rises Up at Harborplace." Morning Sun, 25 July 1984.
- Goodman, Peter. "High-Tech Carnegie Hall Light Show." Newsday, 25 Mar. 1988.
- Gordon, Harry. "What a Blast!" Time, Australia, 9 May 1988, p. 48-51.
- Greene, Deborah I. "Show Set to be Launched." Evening Sun, 12 July 1984.
- Gros, Roger. "The Adventure Begins." Casino Journal, Mar. 1996, pp. 52–54.
- Gunts, Edward. "City to Build Fantasy Ship for Maryland Historical Cruise." News American, 4 May 1984.
- Hamilton, Robert K. "Maryland Memory Christened at Bash." The Sun, 29 July 1984.
- Hawks, Ellen. "A Voyage Back into Maryland History." The Evening Sun, 18 July 1984.
- Kirschbaum, Jed. "Fantasizing." Evening Sun, 6 June 1984.
- Kraft, Fred G. "Ship Ahoy!" The News American, 18 July 1984.
- Lambert, Lawrence A. "How to Enjoy the Weekend." The Cincinnati Post, 1 July 1988.
- L.N. "Magia de Hollywood Concorre à Animaçâo da Doca." Diario de Noticias, 15 Feb. 1997.
- Mertens, Susan. "La bohème." The Vancouver Sun, 22 Oct. 1976.
- Meyer, Janet L. Sydney Pollack: A Critical Filmography. Jefferson, North Carolina, McFarland, 2009.
- Polakov, Lester (1993). We Live to Paint Again. Logbooks Press. ISBN 978-0963972002.
- Powers, Kelly A.J. "Sailing through Maryland's past." The News American, 16 July 1984
- Prouty, Howard H., editor. Variety and Daily Variety Television Reviews 1993–1994. New York, Garland., 1996.
- Scarupa, Henry. "A Sea Full of Fantasy." Morning Sun, 19 July 1984.
- Shie. "Sonny & Cher; Frank Welker." Variety, 24 Jan. 1978.
- Tucker, Kelly. "Disco at the Dome: It'll Be 'The World's Biggest'." The Times – Picayune, 23 Feb. 1979.
- Wenn. "Daniel Flannery | Biography and Filmography." Hollywood.com, 3 Feb. 2015, www.Hollywood.com/celebrities/daniel-flannery-58698148/. Accessed 8 September 2017.
- Zimmermann, A. (n.d.). Lortel Archives. Retrieved August 30, 2017, from www.lortel.org/Archives/CreditableEntity/20450
- Zimmermann, A. (n.d.). Lortel Archives. Retrieved August 30, 2017, from www.lortel.org/Archives/Production/2718
- Zubin Mehta: A Musical Journey, By Bakhtiar K Dadabhoy
- "90 'Symphantasy III'" The Cincinnati Enquirer, 29 June 1990, p. 78.
- "A History of Maryland in Rash Field." Morning Sun, 4 May 1984.
- "Adventure Slots: The Thrill Ride." Casino Player, Apr. 1996.
- "Cincinnati Sypmphony Orchestra and Pops Orchestra." Cincinnati Magazine, July 1988, p. 22.
- "Cincinnati Conductor 'Tops in Pops'." The Scroll of Phi Delta Theta, Winter 1990–1991, p. 6.
- "City to Display 'Fantasy Ship'." Evening Sun. 5 April 1984.
- "Daniel Flannery & MPE." Mpe Leisure Entertainment Consultancy Creator of Terror on Church Street and Hollywood Cars, www.mpe-Europe.com/projects/daniel-flannery-mpe/?lang=en. Accessed 8 September 2017.
- "Death Becomes Her." IMDb: The Internet Movie Database. IMDb.com-Amazon.com, 1990–2017. Web. 30 Aug.2017. "Death Becomes Her (1992)". imdb.com.
- "Flannery's 'Fantasy' at Blossom Fest." Variety, 20 June 1979.
- "Jurassic Park: The Ride – Credits." The studiotour.Com – Jurassic Park: The Ride – Universal Studios Hollywood, www.thestudiotour.com/ush/attractions/jurassicparkriveradventure_creative.shtml. Accessed 8 September 2017.
- "Star Wars Concert." Time, Vol 110(23), 5 Dec. 1977.
- "The Adventure of Conan." The studiotour.Com – Universal Studios Hollywood – The Adventures of Conan, www.thestudiotour.com/ush/attractions/adventuresofconan.php. Accessed 8 September 2017.
