= The Adventures of Conan: A Sword and Sorcery Spectacular =

Defunct stunt show

Universal Studios Hollywood
- Area: Upper Lot
- Status: Removed
- Opening date: 1983
- Closing date: 1993
- Replaced: The Land of a Thousand Faces (1975 - 1980); Castle Dracula Live Show (1980 - 1983)
- Replaced by: Beetlejuice's Rock and Roll Graveyard Revue

Ride statistics
- Attraction type: Stunt Show
- Theme: Conan the Barbarian
- Duration: 20

The Adventures of Conan: A Sword and Sorcery Spectacular was an attraction at American theme park Universal Studios Hollywood that ran from 1983 to 1993. It was an 18-minute live-action stage show, similar to the theme park's other "action spectaculars", that took place in a 2,200-seat indoor theater and was loosely based on the film Conan the Barbarian. The show was designed by Gary Goddard, and cost $4 million to build.

It debuted on June 18, 1983, replacing the "Castle Dracula Live Show", and ran for 10 years until it was replaced in 1993 by Beetlejuice's Rock and Roll Graveyard Revue.

== Premise ==
The stage is decorated to resemble a ruined temple filled with treasure. Conan, a skinny young Cimmerian, descends down a rope onto the stage, hoping to plunder the temple's treasures. Conan is mesmerized by the Dragon's Eye, which beckons him to remove it from its holding place, until he is interrupted by the eccentric old wizard Kallias. Kallias explains that the Dragon's Eye contains the evil wizard Taras-Mordor, who was sealed away with the combined powers of Kallias and the Sword of Crom.

Red Sonja is also mesmerized by the Dragon's Eye. Before Conan and Kallias can stop her, she removes the Eye from its altar, freeing Taras-Mordor. Kallias and Mordor duel, and Mordor disintegrates Kallias. Sonja yells at Conan to grab a sword to defend himself, and the youth grabs the Sword of Crom, transforming him into a musclebound barbarian. Mordor summons three powerful warriors, whom Conan and Sonja manage to defeat. Taras Mordor transforms into a 20-foot-tall fire-breathing dragon to ascend from the pit, and after a brief fight Conan defeats the dragon with a stab from the Sword of Crom. The Dragon's Eye is placed back upon its altar, sealing the evil wizard away once more and bringing Kallias back to life.
