= Matt Ford (lighting designer) =

American lighting designer

- Matt Ford
- Born: Matthew James Ford; Dallas, Texas, U.S.
- Occupation: Lighting Designer
- Website: https://mattfordld.com/

Matt Ford is a lighting designer based in Los Angeles, California. His notable projects have included NBC's Hollywood Game Night, America's Got Talent, ABC's Jimmy Kimmel Live!, and The CW's Penn and Teller Fool Us.

He has designed lighting for a wide range of television productions. He is also the co-creator of the Los Angeles haunted attraction The House at Haunted Hill.

== Emmy awards and nominations ==
Year	Award	Category	Work	Result
1998	Primetime Emmy Award	Outstanding Lighting Direction (Electronic) For A Drama Series, Variety Series, Miniseries, Movie	70th Annual Academy Awards	Won
1999	Primetime Emmy Award	Outstanding Lighting Direction (Electronic) For A Drama Series, Variety Series, Miniseries, Movie	71st Annual Academy Awards	Won
2002	Primetime Emmy Award	Outstanding Lighting Direction (Electronic, Multi-Camera) for Variety, Music or Comedy Programming	America: A Tribute to Heroes	Nominated
2003	Primetime Emmy Award	Outstanding Lighting Direction (Electronic, Multi-Camera) for Variety, Music or Comedy Programming	American Idol: Finale	Nominated
2009	Primetime Emmy Award	Outstanding Lighting Direction (Electronic, Multi-Camera) for Variety, Music or Comedy Programming	Jimmy Kimmel Live: Episode 09-1182	Nominated
