= Patrick Woodroffe (lighting designer) =

British lighting designer (born 1954)

Patrick Woodroffe OBE RDI (born 11 June 1954) is a lighting designer and director who trained at Rose Bruford College and works in the worlds of music, dance, fashion, art and architecture.

== Career ==
Woodroffe began his career in lighting in 1973 and since then has lit and directed productions for many artists including ABBA, AC/DC, Adele, Bob Dylan, The Police, Take That, Peter Gabriel, Simon and Garfunkel, Genesis, Rammstein, Stevie Wonder,10CC, Rod Stewart, The Eagles, Lady Gaga, Donna Summer, Tina Turner, Pet Shop Boys, Michael Jackson, Elton John and Paul McCartney at the White House (3 June 2010).

Woodroffe has worked with The Rolling Stones as their lighting designer and creative director since 1982. He lit Martin Scorsese's Shine a Light, the 2006 documentary of the band’s Beacon Theatre performances during their A Bigger Bang Tour.

He has lit operas and ballet, where the lighting took the place of the scenery, notably, Romeo and Juliet at the Vienna State Opera (2001) and Swan Lake for the English National Ballet (1985).

Since 1995 Woodroffe has lit the Vanity Fair Oscar parties in Los Angeles and Cannes. In 2000 he was involved with the then Millennium Dome, lighting the show and the exterior of the building. In 2002 he lit the Queen's Party at the Palace concert from the gardens at Buckingham Palace.

In 2009 Woodroffe designed the lighting for the This Is It show for Michael Jackson where his work was featured in the 2009 American documentary concert film.

In 2012 he lit the London 2012 Olympic Games and London 2012 Paralympic Games opening and closing ceremonies.

In 2013 he and Adam Bassett (long-term Design Associate and Lighting Designer), created the lighting consultancy, Woodroffe Bassett Design (WBD). The company operates globally designing lighting for many different genres including music, theatrical performance, special events as well as permanent architectural entertainment installations.

In 2013 he was made a Royal Designer for Industry by the RSA and he was appointed as an Officer of the Order of the British Empire (OBE) in the 2014 Birthday Honours for services to the arts.

In 2020 Woodroffe redesigned Lake of Dreams at Wynn Las Vegas, after it originally opened in 2005.
