= Adam Bassett =

British lighting designer

Adam Bassett (born 5 November 1978) is a British Lighting designer working in the worlds of live performance, theatre, art and architecture.

== Education ==
Bassett trained at the Central School of Speech and Drama in London, graduating in 2000.

== Career ==
Bassett began his career in lighting in 2000 and since then has lit and directed productions for many artists including Scandal, Simply Red, Adele, Elton John, The Rolling Stones, Take That, Lady Gaga, Genesis, Mark Ronson, Spandau Ballet, Emeli Sande.

In theatre and dance Bassett has lit productions including Hugh Jackman World Tour, The Band (Take That Musical), Bear Grylls Endeavour, Phantom of the Opera 25th Anniversary, Batman Live World Tour, Into the Hoods, Ant and Dec Saturday Night Takeaway, Holiday on Ice.

He has lit Battersea Power Station, The Shard Installations and Dinosaurs in the Wild and continues to assist The Wynn Hotels in Las Vegas with the exterior lighting systems.

Bassett first started working with Patrick Woodroffe in 1999 on the then Millennium Dome, lighting both the show inside and the exterior of the building. He worked with Woodroffe on Martin Scorsese's Shine a Light, the 2006 documentary of the Rolling Stone’s Beacon Theatre performances during their A Bigger Bang Tour.

In 2013 he and Patrick Woodroffe created the lighting consultancy, Woodroffe Bassett Design (WBD). The company operates globally designing lighting for many different genres including music, theatrical performance, special events as well as permanent architectural entertainment installations.

Since 2003 Bassett has lit the Vanity Fair Oscar parties in Los Angeles. He is the lighting designer for the Doha Film Festival in Qatar, which he has done since the first festival was held in 2009.

In 2012 he was the associate lighting designer for the opening and closing ceremonies of the 2012 London Olympics and Paralympics.

Bassett was the lighting designer for The 4th Islamic Games opening and closing ceremonies in Baku. In 2018 he started work as the Principal Consultant and Lighting Designer for Expo 2020.

In 2019 he lit the Pan American Games opening ceremony in Lima and 48th UAE National Day. In 2022 Bassett was the lighting designer for Royal Edinburgh Military Tattoo.

== Awards and nominations ==
In 2004 Bassett was received the EDDY Award for the best “Composite Lighting Team”. In 2012 he was nominated for an Emmy at the 65th Primetime Emmy Awards, for Outstanding Lighting Design/Lighting Direction for a Variety Special, for his work on the 2012 London Olympics opening ceremony. In 2016 he was award the Knight of Illumination Awards for the lighting design of The Rolling Stones Exhibition.
