= A Dream of a Dream =

- Shōgun episode
- Episode no.: Season 1 Episode 10
- Directed by: Frederick E. O. Toye
- Written by: Maegan Houang; Emily Yoshida
- Cinematography by: Sam McCurdy
- Editing by: Maria Gonzales; Aika Miyake
- Original release date: April 23, 2024
- Running time: 63 minutes

Guest appearances
- Yasunari Takeshima as Tonomoto Akinao / Muraji; Hiroto Kanai as Kashigi Omi; Moeka Hoshi as Usami Fuji; Yoriko Dōguchi as Kiri no Kata; Eisuke Sasai as Lord Ito; Shinnosuke Abe as Toda "Buntaro" Hirokatsu; Eita Okuno as Saeki Nobutatsu; Hiromoto Ida as Kiyama ukon Sadanaga; Takeshi Kurokawa as Ohno Harunobu

Episode chronology
← Previous "Crimson Sky"	Next → —

"A Dream of a Dream" (Japanese: 夢の中の夢, Hepburn: Yume no Naka no Yume) is the tenth and final episode of the first season of the American historical drama television series Shōgun, based on the novel by James Clavell. The episode was written by Maegan Houang and Emily Yoshida, and directed by Frederick E. O. Toye. It was released on Hulu on April 23, 2024, and it also aired on FX on the same day.

The series is set in 1600, and follows three characters. John Blackthorne, a risk-taking English sailor who ends up shipwrecked in Japan, a land whose unfamiliar culture will ultimately redefine him; Lord Toranaga, a shrewd, powerful daimyo, at odds with his own dangerous, political rivals; and Lady Mariko, a woman with invaluable skills but dishonorable family ties, who must prove her value and allegiance. In the episode, Toranaga and Blackthorne face an uncertain future as they prepare for the incoming war.

According to Nielsen Media Research, the episode was seen by an estimated 0.625 million household viewers and gained a 0.09 ratings share among adults aged 18–49. The episode received critical acclaim, who praised the episode as a satisfying conclusion to the storylines, while also highlighting the performances, visuals and writing as strong points.

Originally conceived as a limited series, it was reported in May 2024 that two more seasons were in early development.

== Plot ==
Blackthorne mourns over Mariko's body, imagining a dream of him as an old man back in England with her cross necklace, while Yabushige privately asks for forgiveness for his role in her death. The Council unanimously votes to declare war on Toranaga after asking for Mariko to be given a Christian burial, although they do not believe Ishido's claims that Toranaga orchestrated the attack.

Blackthorne leaves Osaka with Yabushige and Toranaga's consorts after recovering from his wounds, at the cost of missing Mariko's funeral, with Alvito having informed him that Mariko arranged for the Church to spare his life before her death. Upon arriving in Ajiro, they discover that the Erasmus has been burned, and Yabushige is arrested and his swords are confiscated. At the same time, Toranaga's men ruthlessly hunt for suspected traitors, as Omi has correctly deduced he was responsible. Yabushige confesses to having aided Ishido, so Toranaga revokes his titles and orders him to commit seppuku the following day, agreeing to become his second when Yabushige tries to beg for a dishonorable death. Yabushige names Omi as his heir, although whether or not he will receive Izu is up to Toranaga.

Blackthorne reunites with Fuji, who informs him that she plans to become a nun, effectively relieved from her duties as his consort. The next day, Blackthorne meets with Toranaga, with Muraji acting as his translator, revealing himself as Toranaga's spy and a samurai who has been working for him. Blackthorne wants Toranaga to spare the people of Ajiro and reveals that he is aware that Mariko was responsible for destroying the Erasmus as it would ensure his life would be spared. Despite Blackthorne promising not to pursue retaliation against the church, Toranaga refuses. Blackthorne threatens to commit seppuku, but Toranaga stops him and orders the construction of a fleet of ships.

Toranaga later meets with Yabushige before he commits seppuku and confirms he was responsible for destroying the Erasmus to prevent Blackthorne from leaving, and that "Crimson Sky" was never an attack but was actually Mariko going to Osaka; Mariko's death helped convince Ochiba to withdraw her support from Ishido ahead of the future Battle of Sekigahara. Yabushige deduces that Toranaga's ultimate goal was always to assume the position of shogun, and that his previous reluctance was nothing more than a ruse. Despite Yabushige's insistence, Toranaga does not open up about his complete plan. Yabushige stabs himself in the stomach with his wakizashi and smiles at Toranaga, who beheads him with his katana. Meanwhile, Blackthorne and Fuji sail together in a boat, where Blackthorne helps her pour her family's ashes into the sea in an act of gratitude for her services; in turn, Fuji helps Blackthorne discard Mariko's cross into the water as well, revealing his dream of himself in England with her necklace was never real. With the help of Muraji and the villagers, Blackthorne begins efforts to salvage the Erasmus before a repentant Buntaro arrives to help. After the Erasmus is partially pulled out of the sea, Blackthorne exchanges a silent look with Toranaga in the distance before leaving the scene. Meanwhile, Toranaga looks towards the mountains, seemingly preparing for something more.

== Production ==
=== Development ===
In March 2024, Hulu confirmed that the tenth episode of the series would be titled "A Dream of a Dream", and was to be written by Maegan Houang and Emily Yoshida, and directed by Frederick E. O. Toye. It was Houang's second writing credit, Yoshida's second writing credit, and Toye's fourth directing credit.

=== Writing ===
On opening the episode with a dream-like scene featuring an older Blackthorne, Justin Marks explained, "we initially frame the story as if it were the recollection of an old man looking back on his life with regret in some way, only to find that what we were really seeing was the dream of a young man looking forward with regret to the life that he could possibly have."

Toranaga revealing his real plan was slightly different from the novel. While the series has him reveal part of it to Yabushige, only the reader is told about this in the novel. Marks felt that it was important for Yabushige to know, as they knew they were "sending Yabushige into oblivion." Through this ending, Toranaga would be involved in the Tokugawa shogunate and start the creation of the Edo period, which would last until 1868. Hiroyuki Sanada considered this "kind of a happy ending", as the viewer would know what Toranaga creates by doing research. He said, "That's Toranaga's vision. That's what he's been struggling for and that's what his never-give-up mindset has achieved."

The Battle of Sekigahara is alluded, but not shown in the episode. Marks noted that while the battle was considered, he acknowledged the difficulty of pulling it off. Michaela Clavell, daughter of author James Clavell and executive producer, convinced him that her father wouldn't want the battle depicted, as he was preoccupied with the characters and story that he simply would choose to end the story before it even happens. Marks also noted that the battle "was a little dishonest to the story", and compared it to its omission in the novel, "if we really thought we were getting that, we weren't really watching what was happening."

On the final scene, Cosmo Jarvis explained, "I think that final moment in episode 10 is the first time you can be sure that he's doing something completely selflessly. And therefore, it brought about the question, How honest are his motivations and assertions that came before that? Were they at any point? I think that's the core of him." He also added, "the pureness of the initial recognition and respect and admiration is just momentarily beaten by the fact that this is actually Yoshii Toranaga, and this is probably just the beginning."

== Reception ==
=== Viewers ===
In its original FX broadcast, "A Dream of a Dream" was seen by an estimated 0.625 million household viewers and gained a 0.09 ratings share among adults aged 18–49, according to Nielsen Media Research. This means that 0.09 percent of all households with televisions watched the episode. This was a 16% increase in viewership from the previous episode, which was seen by an estimated 0.538 million household viewers and gained a 0.09 ratings share among adults aged 18–49.

=== Critical reviews ===
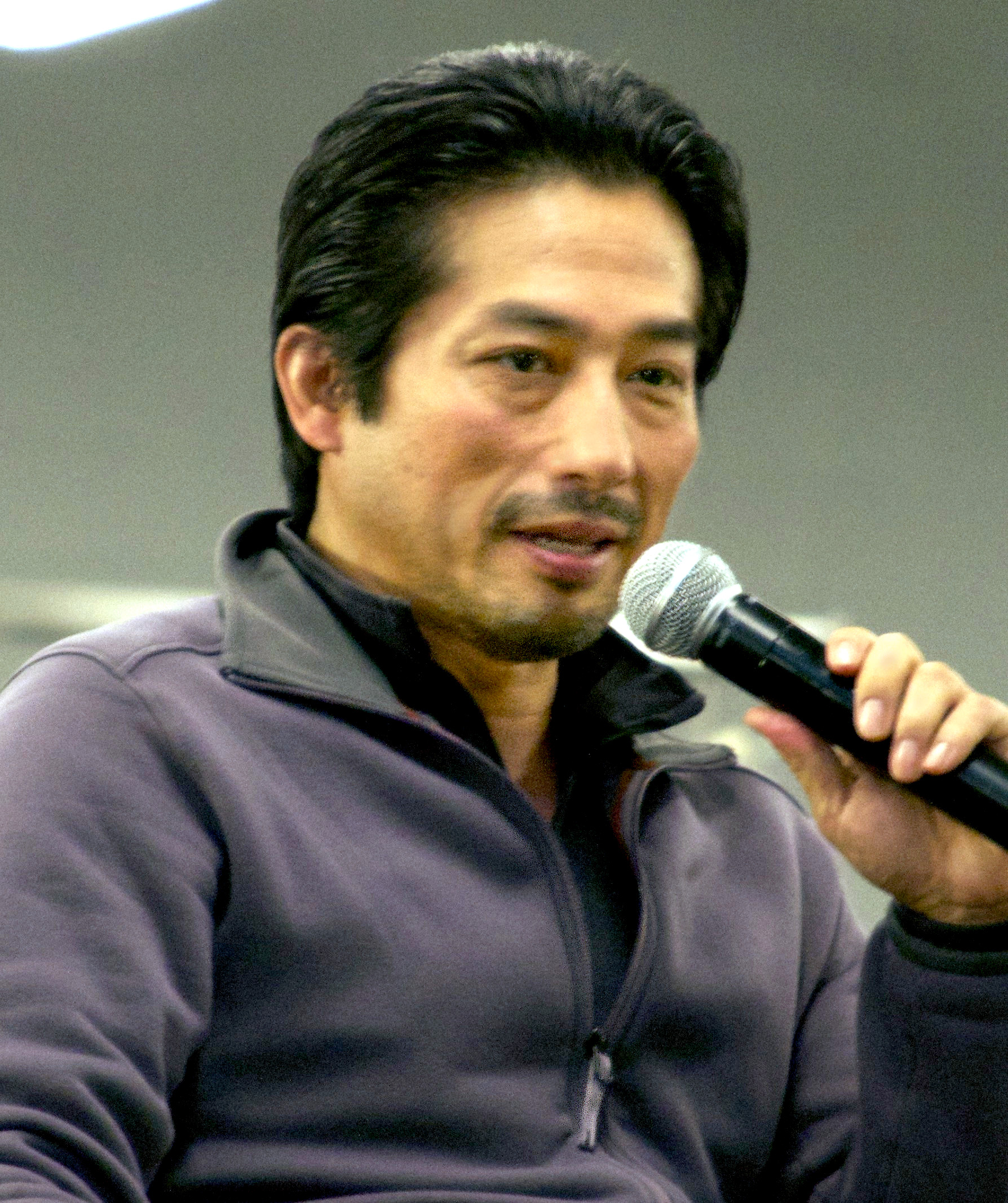
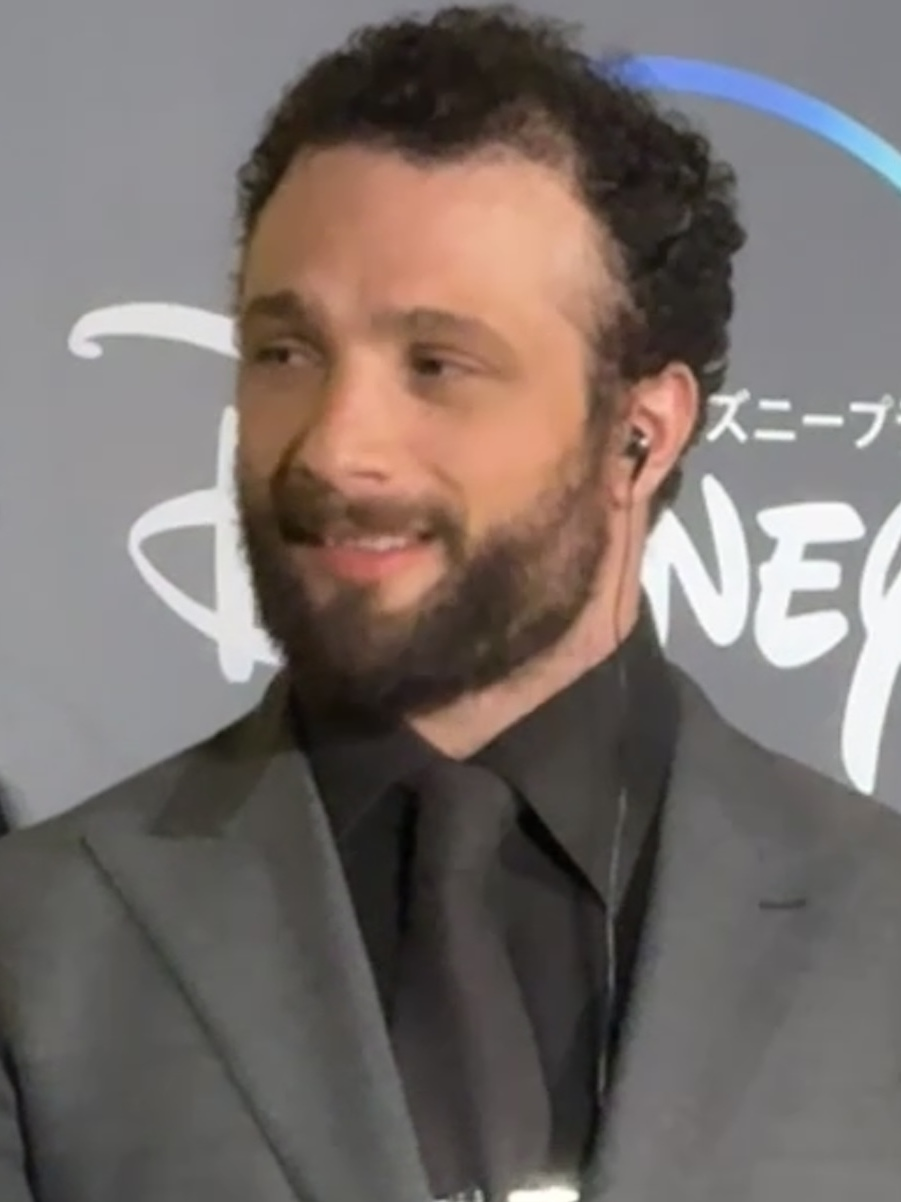
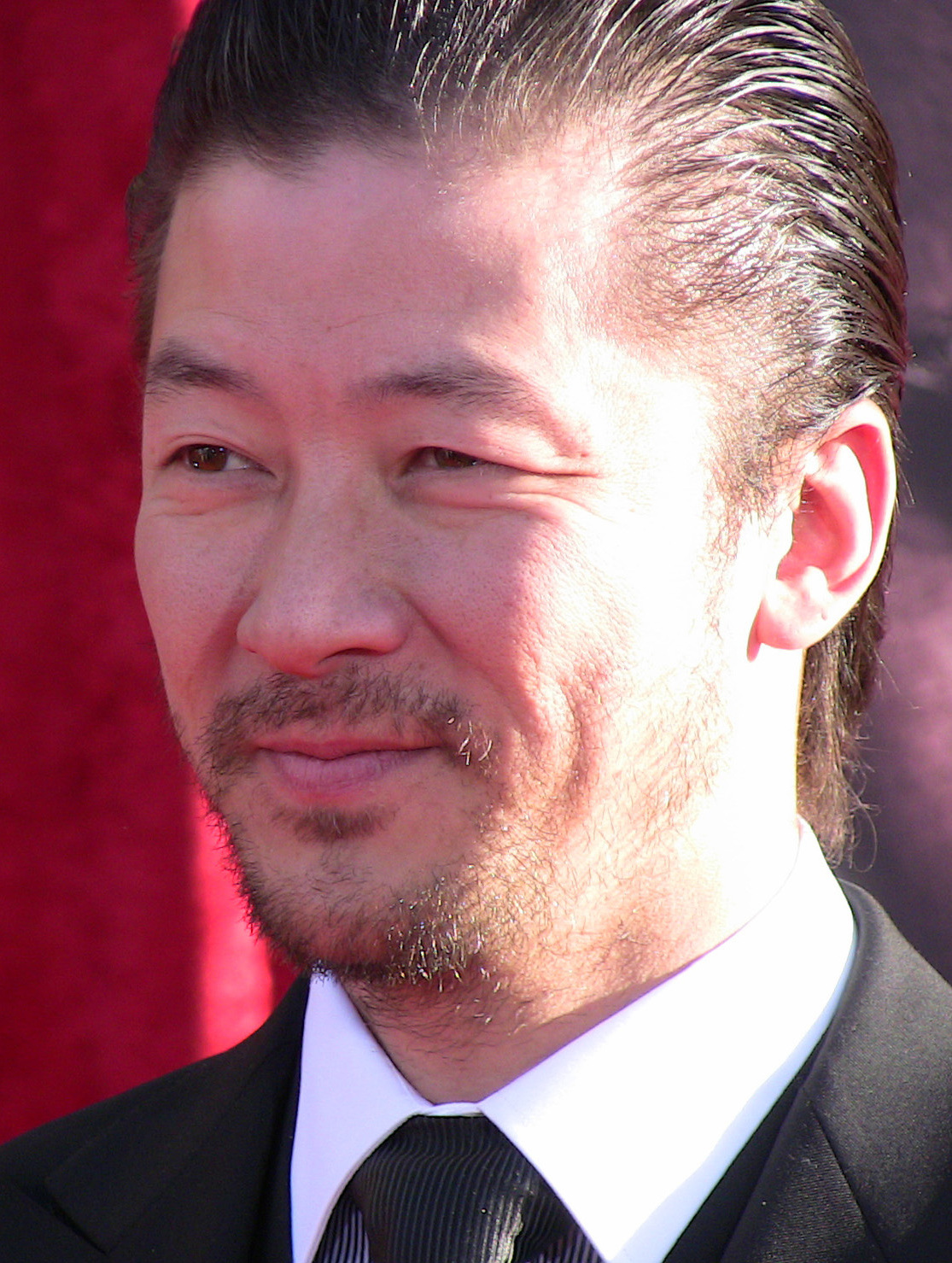
The performances of Hiroyuki Sanada, Cosmo Jarvis, and Tadanobu Asano (L–R) earned widespread critical acclaim.

"A Dream of a Dream" received critical acclaim. The review aggregator website Rotten Tomatoes reported a 100% approval rating for the episode, based on 7 reviews, with an average rating of 9.3/10.

Meredith Hobbs Coons of The A.V. Club gave the episode an "A–" and wrote, "Yabushige hopes his [words] will resonate, too, as he leaves a poem and shares his sincere feelings with Omi before he departs. This says something of legacy, something Shōgun recognizes well. And with its words, conveyed by its incredible cast and all involved in its production, the show sets its own legacy, too."

Alan Sepinwall of Rolling Stone wrote, "If "Dream of a Dream" is all she wrote for Shōgun, then the story has been told in satisfying, often extraordinary fashion. And we can study the wind to see if conditions are favorable for that story to continue." Keith Phipps of Vulture gave the episode a perfect 5 star rating out of 5 and wrote, "Yabushige asks Toranaga. "I don't control the wind," he replies. "I only study it." But some can only ride it, and as Blackthorne exchanges a look with Toranaga in the show's final scene, both seem to understand who they are and where they belong."

Sean T. Collins of The New York Times wrote, "So in the end, it is the show's opening credits, with the image of a frightening mask erupting from a mountainside, that have the right of it. Shogun is not the story of a hero charging his enemies. It's the story of a mastermind slowly revealing himself, until a nation cowers before his countenance." Josh Rosenberg of Esquire wrote, "That's plenty of material should Shōgun return for season 2, but this seems like the end for the beloved series. No more bloodshed. Tokugawa is known as one of the great unifiers of Japan. At the end of Shōgun, he promises peace."

Johnny Loftus of Decider wrote, "In the end, all that Yoshii Toranaga has done is like dew on a delicate blade of grass. A dream within a dream. We live, and we die. The rest is just details." Tyler Johnson of TV Fanatic gave the episode a 4.5 star rating out of 5 and wrote, "Shogun entertained, of course. At times, it even leaned heavily on some very familiar tropes. But in the end, it delivered a story that always kept us guessing, characters as richly rendered as any we've seen previously, and an interest in subtext and recurring themes that had us harkening back to TV's most recent golden age."

=== Accolades ===
TVLine named Tadanobu Asano as an honorable mention for the "Performer of the Week" for the week of April 27, 2024, for his performance in the episode. The site wrote, "Shōgun's scruffy warlord Yabushige may not have been one of the key power players on FX's samurai epic, but Tadanobu Asano grunted his way into our hearts as the strictly pragmatic schemer. In this week's finale, Asano revealed a tender side to Yabushige when he expressed deep regret for his role in Mariko's death, and then he was amusingly frantic as Yabushige tried to save his skin by striking a side bargain with Blackthorne. But his luck ran out, and Asano wore a resigned tranquility as Yabushige faced his certain death, cracking jokes to Omi about finding his wife a new husband who's "not an idiot" and calmly shooting the breeze with Toranaga. Even his final moments, grinning at Toranaga over his shoulder before the lord beheaded him, managed to put a smile on our faces."
