= Ladies of the Willow World =

- Shōgun episode
- Episode no.: Season 1 Episode 6
- Directed by: Hiromi Kamata
- Written by: Maegan Houang
- Cinematography by: Marc Laliberté
- Editing by: Thomas A. Krueger
- Original release date: March 26, 2024
- Running time: 57 minutes

Guest appearances
- Tokuma Nishioka as Toda "Iron Fist" Hiromatsu; Eisuke Sasai as Lord Ito; Hiroto Kanai as Kashigi Omi; Yuko Miyamoto as Gin; Yoriko Dōguchi as Kiri no Kata; Shinnosuke Abe as Toda "Buntaro" Hirokatsu; Moeka Hoshi as Usami Fuji; Yuki Kura as Yoshii Nagakado; Yuka Kouri as Kiku; Ako as Daiyoin / Lady Iyo; Yukijiro Hotaru as Nakamura Hidetoshi; Paulino Nunes as Father Visitor Carlo Dell'Acqua; Yutaka Takeuchi as Akechi Jinsai; Eijiro Ozaki as Lord Kuroda Nobuhisa; Hiromoto Ida as Kiyama ukon Sadanaga; Toshi Toda as Sugiyama Josui; Takeshi Kurokawa as Ohno Harunobu

Episode chronology
← Previous "Broken to the Fist"	Next → "A Stick of Time"

"Ladies of the Willow World" (Japanese: うたかたの女たち, Hepburn: Utakata no Onnatachi) is the sixth episode of the American historical drama television series Shōgun, based on the novel by James Clavell. The episode was written by Maegan Houang, and directed by Hiromi Kamata. It was released on Hulu on March 26, 2024, and it also aired on FX on the same day.

The series is set in 1600, and follows three characters. John Blackthorne, a risk-taking English sailor who ends up shipwrecked in Japan, a land whose unfamiliar culture will ultimately redefine him; Lord Toranaga, a shrewd, powerful daimyo, at odds with his own dangerous, political rivals; and Lady Mariko, a woman with invaluable skills but dishonorable family ties, who must prove her value and allegiance. In the episode, Blackthorne visits a brothel with Mariko, while Ochiba and Ishido take the regents hostage at Osaka Castle.

According to Nielsen Media Research, the episode was seen by an estimated 0.523 million household viewers and gained a 0.10 ratings share among adults aged 18–49. The episode received critical acclaim, who praised the episode's writing and pacing.

== Plot ==
In 1578, a young Mariko is brought to live in Azuchi Castle, home of warlord Kuroda Nobuhisa. She becomes friends with his daughter Ruri, the future Ochiba, and witnesses Nobuhisa executing her father's allies. She is also forced to marry Buntaro as atonement for her father's betrayal.

In 1600, Toranaga delivers a eulogy to his fallen army soldiers. He privately talks with Buntaro over his behavior, and Buntaro claims he cannot live in Blackthorne's house for Mariko's sake. Toranaga punishes him by staying one week out of his wife's life, which Buntaro accepts. For saving him, Toranaga surprises Blackthorne by promoting him to chief admiral and general of the cannon regiment. Blackthorne once again asks to leave Japan, but Toranaga declines his request. Toranaga reveals to Mariko that Jinsai wanted her to continue his work of protecting Japan. Toranaga also assigns her to take Blackthorne to a brothel known as the Willow World.

Ochiba and Ishido take the remaining three regents and their families hostage at Osaka Castle under the pretense that there is a plot to kill Yaechiyo. Hiromatsu escapes but must leave Kiri and Toranaga's pregnant consort, Shizu, behind. Ochiba believes Toranaga plotted her father's death, so she and Ishido offer Ito, an influential warlord, a seat on the council. Sugiyama refuses to confirm Ito and tries to flee Osaka with his family, but Ishido and his men catch up to and then slaughter them.

Hiromatsu reaches Ajiro and informs Toranaga of the situation in Osaka. Toranaga's war council wants to use his secret Crimson Sky plan, involving a quick, decisive attack on Osaka Castle, to defeat Ishido. Toranaga refuses, understanding that this will most likely make him the new shōgun. When news of Sugiyama's death reaches Ajiro, Toranaga realizes that his impeachment is inevitable and invokes Crimson Sky to protect Yaechiyo and limit future bloodshed. The villagers of Ajiro support Toranaga's decision.

== Production ==
=== Development ===
In February 2024, Hulu confirmed that the sixth episode of the series would be titled "Ladies of the Willow World", and was to be written by Maegan Houang, and directed by Hiromi Kamata. It was Houang's first writing credit, and Kamata's first directing credit.

=== Writing ===
Anna Sawai was fascinated by exploring Mariko's childhood in the episode. She said, "the idea of duty became a little more livid", as the episode explored her friendship with Ochiba and their eventual separation as she accepts her marriage.

== Reception ==
=== Viewers ===
In its original FX broadcast, "Ladies of the Willow World" was seen by an estimated 0.523 million household viewers and gained a 0.10 ratings share among adults aged 18–49, according to Nielsen Media Research. This means that 0.10 percent of all households with televisions watched the episode. This was a slight decrease in viewership from the previous episode, which was seen by an estimated 0.554 million household viewers and gained a 0.10 ratings share among adults aged 18–49.

=== Critical reviews ===
"Ladies of the Willow World" received critical acclaim. The review aggregator website Rotten Tomatoes reported a 100% approval rating for the episode, based on 4 reviews.

Meredith Hobbs Coons of The A.V. Club gave the episode an "A" and wrote, "If you guessed that an episode called "Ladies Of The Willow World" would primarily feature the stories of the women of Shōgun, you would be right. And they have really been through hell, man. Sure, the guys have a pretty brutal time of it, too, but at least they have agency." Jesse Raub of Vulture gave the episode a 4 star rating out of 5 and wrote, "To this point, it's been easy to read Shōgun as a story about powerful men making important decisions. "Ladies of the Willow World," however, invites us to reckon with how the show's women have dealt with the ramifications of these decisions."

Sean T. Collins of The New York Times wrote, "Clearly, Shogun is building steam as our knowledge of both the characters and the stakes deepen. The more you see of it, the more you want to know how it ends." Josh Rosenberg of Esquire wrote, ""War will be declared on my clan," Toranaga tells his men. "I desire no land. I want no honors. But if traitors place the Taikō's heir in danger, then I must defend him. Crimson Sky it will be!" You heard the man — we're in for a battle next week."

Johnny Loftus of Decider wrote, "Mariko's childhood memories weave through episode six of Shōgun like the fine silk threading of a kimono." Tyler Johnson of TV Fanatic gave the episode a 4.5 star rating out of 5 and wrote, "This episode of Shogun went in the opposite direction, eschewing violence and extravagant action set-pieces in order to demonstrate that the series can accomplish just as much with dialogue as it can with swords."
