= The Abyss of Life =

- Shōgun episode
- Episode no.: Season 1 Episode 8
- Directed by: Emmanuel Osei-Kuffour
- Written by: Shannon Goss
- Cinematography by: Marc Laliberté
- Editing by: Aika Miyake
- Original release date: April 9, 2024
- Running time: 58 minutes

Guest appearances
- Tokuma Nishioka as Toda "Iron Fist" Hiromatsu; Hiroto Kanai as Kashigi Omi; Yuko Miyamoto as Gin; Shinnosuke Abe as Toda "Buntaro" Hirokatsu; Yuki Kura as Yoshii Nagakado; Ako as Daiyoin / Lady Iyo; Yuka Kouri as Kiku; Yoshi Amao as Sera; Haruka Igarashi as Rin; Hitoshi Masaki as Tomono

Episode chronology
← Previous "A Stick of Time"	Next → "Crimson Sky"

"The Abyss of Life" (Japanese: 奈落の底, Hepburn: Naraku no Soko) is the eighth episode of the American historical drama television series Shōgun, based on the novel by James Clavell. The episode was written by co-executive producer Shannon Goss, and directed by Emmanuel Osei-Kuffour. It was released on Hulu on April 9, 2024, and it also aired on FX on the same day.

The series is set in 1600, and follows three characters. John Blackthorne, a risk-taking English sailor who ends up shipwrecked in Japan, a land whose unfamiliar culture will ultimately redefine him; Lord Toranaga, a shrewd, powerful daimyo, at odds with his own dangerous, political rivals; and Lady Mariko, a woman with invaluable skills but dishonorable family ties, who must prove her value and allegiance. In the episode, Toranaga grieves the death of his son, while Ishido and Ochiba plan to take advantage of this.

According to Nielsen Media Research, the episode was seen by an estimated 0.436 million household viewers and gained a 0.08 ratings share among adults aged 18–49. The episode received critical acclaim, with Hiroyuki Sanada receiving universal acclaim for his performance in the episode. Sanada submitted the episode to support his Emmy nomination for Outstanding Lead Actor in a Drama Series for which he won.

== Plot ==
After Nagakado's death, Toranaga leads his army to Edo for his funeral, intending to spend 49 days of mourning. His army attends the funeral, but Toranaga cannot bring himself to attend. At Osaka Castle, Ishido proposes marriage to Ochiba to strengthen their alliance, hoping to capitalize on Toranaga's grief.

Alvito suggests an alliance with Ochiba, but Toranaga tells the priest to inform Ishido that he will formally surrender, believing that Ochiba will never accept his terms. Toranaga blames the Church for not supporting his cause, though he still grants adjacent plots of land in Edo to both the Church and the Willow World brothel. Buntaro and Mariko have a tea ceremony, where he proposes that they commit suicide to protest Toranaga's surrender, but Mariko refuses, explaining that she simply wants to be away from him. Blackthorne visits his former shipmates. One of them, Salamon, confronts him about his piloting decisions that brought them to Japan and blames him for their situation before starting a fight with him; after Blackthorne punches him repeatedly in the face to the point of unconsciousness, he realizes his old life with them is over. Later, Blackthorne offers his services to Yabushige, who initially refuses. Daiyoin, the wife of the late Taikō, suffers a stroke and begs Ochiba to end her hostilities and release the hostages before dying.

Toranaga's vassals sign their names to a formal letter of surrender, but Hiromatsu refuses to sign after one of them speaks out. When Toranaga refuses to fight, Hiromatsu commits seppuku as he feels he can no longer serve him, with Buntaro reluctantly acting as his second. That night, Toranaga reveals to Mariko that Hiromatsu committed suicide to make his enemies believe his defeat was real. Yabushige is thus convinced and accepts Blackthorne's services. Toranaga asks Mariko to travel to Osaka on his behalf. The next morning, at the resting place of his son, Toranaga thanks Nagakado and Hiromatsu and vows not to waste the time they bought.

== Production ==
=== Development ===
In March 2024, Hulu confirmed that the eighth episode of the series would be titled "The Abyss of Life", and was to be written by co-executive producer Shannon Goss, and directed by Emmanuel Osei-Kuffour. It was Goss' second writing credit, and Osei-Kuffour's first directing credit.

=== Writing ===
For Hiromatsu's death, Hiroyuki Sanada commented, "Yeah, it was hard to shoot mentally, physically. You know, our mind is like almost breaking and it's harder to try to [not] cry in the scene. It was [easier] to cry almost, but they both know what is going to happen if he doesn't commit seppuku." Justin Marks explained that Tokuma Nishioka wanted to play Hiromatsu as "inserting himself" during the scene, with Marks remarking that it made the episode "truly a tragedy on a level that is more than what it even appears to be."

Cosmo Jarvis said that Blackthorne's encounter with Salamon wanted to show how "opportunist" his character was, "You know, at the core of Blackthorne's motivation, there's something that people may or may not pick up on. He's an opportunist and that was in the book. In the book, he's always comparing himself to the respect that Sir Francis Drake got from Queen Elizabeth."

=== Casting ===
Series co-creator Rachel Kondo has a cameo in the episode as a prostitute during the confrontation between Blackthorne and Salamon.

== Reception ==
=== Viewers ===
In its original FX broadcast, "The Abyss of Life" was seen by an estimated 0.436 million household viewers and gained a 0.08 ratings share among adults aged 18–49, according to Nielsen Media Research. This means that 0.08 percent of all households with televisions watched the episode. This was a 20% decrease in viewership from the previous episode, which was seen by an estimated 0.540 million household viewers and gained a 0.09 ratings share among adults aged 18–49.

=== Critical reviews ===
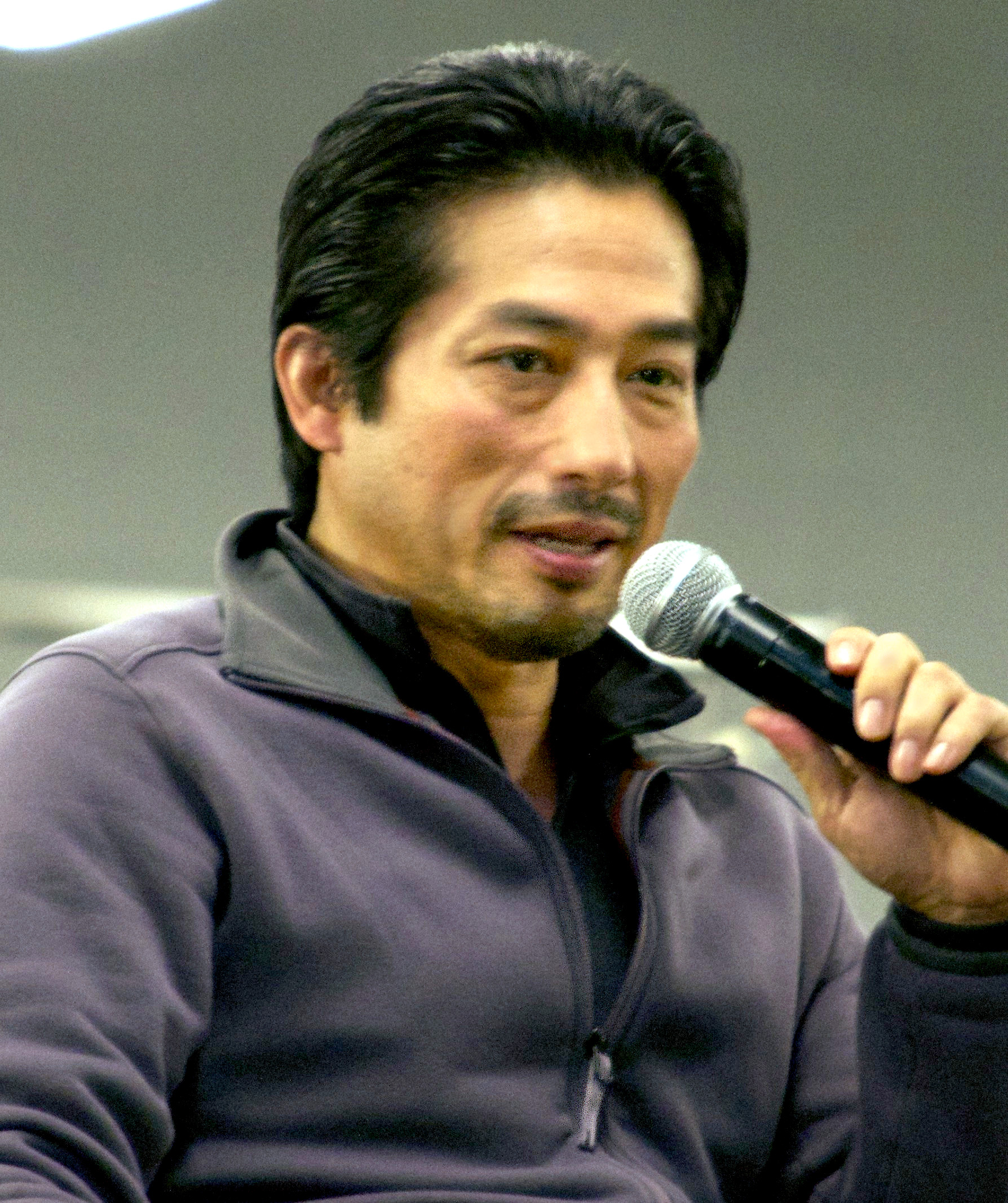
Hiroyuki Sanada's performance received widespread critical acclaim, and the Primetime Emmy Award for Outstanding Lead Actor in a Drama Series.

"The Abyss of Life" received critical acclaim. The review aggregator website Rotten Tomatoes reported a 100% approval rating for the episode, based on 6 reviews, with an average rating of 9.4/10.

Meredith Hobbs Coons of The A.V. Club gave the episode an "A" and wrote, "The rest of Toranaga's men will sail on with Anjin (and none of Blackthorne's men, because their loyalty to him landed them stranded in Japan and mad at him). Mariko is going, too, in a signal to the guys that they must have their lord's blessing, since he sent her. Man, if they weren't dead, Hiromatsu and Nagakado would be so pumped." Keith Phipps of Vulture gave the episode a perfect 5 star rating out of 5 and wrote, "Shōgun has been compelling from the start, but it's picking up some serious closing speed in the back half of its run. Two weeks ago brought the (apparently deferred) promise of Crimson Sky. Last week's episode ended with a powerful shock. "The Abyss of Life" ends with a series of question marks, none more prominent than this one: What is Toranaga doing?"

Sean T. Collins of The New York Times wrote, "The central scene of this week's Shōgun — perhaps the scene from the series so far — confronts vassal and viewer alike with an even more troubling question, one that it draws out for minute after excruciating minute: Is Lord Toranaga sick in his mind as well?" Josh Rosenberg of Esquire wrote, "Lord Toranaga is in a pickle. Actually, no — I don't want to downplay the severity of this situation. He's in something far worse than a pickle. Toranaga is in a giant pickle made of glass, and this glass pickle is dangling precariously from the edge of a kitchen counter, seconds away from shattering."

Johnny Loftus of Decider wrote, "the threat Lord Toranga now faces in Shōgun Episode 8, to the realm and to his clan, has inspired the most relentless, physically costly version of his famous guile." Tyler Johnson of TV Fanaticgave the episode a 4.5 star rating out of 5 and wrote, "Thus far, Shōgun has been so flawlessly executed, so brilliantly realized that we're getting nervous about its ability to stick the landing. Episodes like "The Abyss of Time" inspire confidence, but it's hard not to feel a little apprehensive when you're aware that you're watching a new classic unfold."

=== Accolades ===
TVLine named Hiroyuki Sanada the "Performer of the Week" for the week of April 13, 2024, for his performance in the episode. The site wrote, "Yes, this was all part of the plan, and as Toranaga mournfully prayed over his son's ashes and vowed not to waste the opportunity he'd been given, we were once again reminded of what a clever and cunning leader Toranaga is — and what a powerful and mesmerizing performance Sanada is giving us."
