= Shōgun (2024 TV series) =

2024 American historical drama television series

- Release poster
- Genre: Historical drama
- Created by: Rachel Kondo; Justin Marks
- Based on: Shōgun by James Clavell
- Showrunner: Justin Marks
- Starring: Hiroyuki Sanada; Cosmo Jarvis; Anna Sawai; Tadanobu Asano; Takehiro Hira; Tommy Bastow; Fumi Nikaido
- Composers: Atticus Ross; Leopold Ross; Nick Chuba
- Country of origin: United States
- Original languages: Japanese; English
- No. of seasons: 1
- No. of episodes: 10

Production
- Executive producers: Michaela Clavell; Rachel Kondo; Michael De Luca; Edward L. McDonnell; Justin Marks
- Producers: Jamie Vega Wheeler; Eriko Miyagawa; Hiroyuki Sanada; Erin Smith; Tom Winchester
- Production location: Vancouver
- Cinematography: Christopher Ross; Sam McCurdy; Marc Laliberté; Aril Wretblad
- Editors: Maria Gonzales; Aika Miyake; Thomas A. Krueger
- Running time: 53–70 minutes
- Production companies: Gate 34; Michael De Luca Productions; FXP

Original release
- Network: FX on Hulu; FX
- Release: February 27, 2024 – present

Shōgun is an American historical drama television series created by Rachel Kondo and Justin Marks. It is based on the 1975 novel by James Clavell, which was previously adapted into a 1980 miniseries. Its ensemble cast includes Hiroyuki Sanada, Cosmo Jarvis, Anna Sawai, Tadanobu Asano, Takehiro Hira, Tommy Bastow, and Fumi Nikaido. The production features a mostly Japanese cast and the majority of the dialogue is in the Japanese language.

Initially conceived as a miniseries, the first season premiered its first two episodes on February 27, 2024, on FX on Hulu and FX, with the rest being released weekly until April 23, 2024. It received widespread critical acclaim, particularly for the directing, writing, visuals, production values, performances of its cast, and faithfulness to the source material. Following its success, a second and third season began early development, with the second season starting principal photography in January 2026.

In 2024, Shōgun became the first Japanese-language series to win a Primetime Emmy Award for Outstanding Drama Series, with its first season winning 18 categories at the 76th Primetime Emmy Awards and 76th Primetime Creative Arts Emmy Awards, setting a new record as the most awarded single season of television in Emmy history. It additionally received four Golden Globe Awards, including Best Television Series – Drama and acting wins for Sanada, Sawai, and Asano. The first season also received a Peabody Award at the 85th Annual Ceremony.

== Premise ==
Shōgun follows "the collision of two ambitious men from different worlds, John Blackthorne, a risk-taking English sailor who ends up shipwrecked in Japan, a land whose unfamiliar culture will ultimately redefine him, and Lord Yoshii Toranaga, a shrewd, powerful daimyo, at odds with his own dangerous political rivals. The series also includes Lady Toda Mariko, a woman with invaluable skills but dishonorable family ties, who must prove her value and allegiance."

Clavell's Shōgun is historical fiction. The character of Blackthorne is loosely based on the historical English navigator William Adams, who rose to become a samurai under Tokugawa Ieyasu, a powerful feudal lord (daimyō) who later became the military ruler of Japan (shōgun) and the founder of the Tokugawa shogunate. Ieyasu is the basis for the character of Yoshii Toranaga.

Shōgun is a bilingual television series made in Japanese and English, with some Dutch and Portuguese.

== Cast and characters ==
In the following lists, the names in parentheses represent the historical figure on which the character is based. Japanese names are written family name first, then given name.

=== Main ===
- Hiroyuki Sanada as Lord Yoshii Toranaga (Tokugawa Ieyasu, 1543–1616): A powerful warlord (bushō) and lord of Kantō. One of the five Regents ruling Japan on behalf of the late Taikō's young heir. He is a descendant of the Minowara clan (Minamoto clan) which once ruled over Japan as shōguns. He possesses a brilliant mind for military and political strategy.
- Cosmo Jarvis as Pilot Major John Blackthorne, known to the Japanese as the "Anjin" (William Adams, 1564–1620): A Protestant English maritime pilot who served on a Dutch fleet seeking to establish trade with Japan. He finds himself and his crew captive to the powerful Lord Toranaga.
- Anna Sawai as Toda Mariko (Hosokawa Gracia, 1563–1600) (season 1): A highborn woman with strong loyalty to Toranaga. She is a Catholic convert who serves as a translator between Toranaga and Blackthorne.
- Tadanobu Asano as Kashigi Yabushige (Honda Masanobu, 1538–1616) (season 1): The scheming lord of Izu who serves Toranaga.
- Takehiro Hira as Ishido Kazunari (Ishida Mitsunari, 1559–1600) (season 1): A former peasant turned powerful bushō, one of the five Regents, Toranaga's chief rival, and ruler of Osaka Castle.
- Tommy Bastow as Father Martin Alvito, SJ / "Tsuji" (João Rodrigues Tçuzu, 1561–1634): An empathetic Portuguese priest and reliable translator.
- Fumi Nikaido as Ochiba no Kata / Ruri (Yodo-dono, 1569–1615): The daughter of the late Lord Kuroda Nobuhisa and only consort of the late Taikō who bore an heir, her son Yaechiyo.
- Asami Mizukawa as Aya (season 2)
- Masataka Kubota as Hyūga (season 2)
- Sho Kaneta as Hidenobu (season 2)
- Eisuke Sasai (recurring season 1) and Takaaki Enoki (season 2) as Lord Ito: An influential warlord and Noh performer who is invited to join the council of five Regents
- Jun Kunimura as Gōda (season 2)
- Ren Meguro as Kazutada (season 2)

=== Recurring ===
- Néstor Carbonell as Vasco Rodrigues (season 1): A Spanish sailor in league with the Portuguese who befriends Blackthorne
- Tokuma Nishioka as Toda "Iron Fist" Hiromatsu (Hosokawa Fujitaka, 1534–1610) (season 1): Toranaga's most trusted general and close confidant
- Hiroto Kanai as Kashigi Omi (Honda Masazumi, 1566–1637): Yabushige's bright nephew and the lord of Ajiro
- Yasunari Takeshima as Tonomoto Akinao / Muraji (season 1): A Christian fisherman in Ajiro, who can translate for Blackthorne and is secretly a loyal samurai serving Toranaga
- Moeka Hoshi as Usami Fuji (season 1): Hiromatsu's granddaughter and later Blackthorne's consort
- Yuki Kura as Yoshii Nagakado (Matsudaira Tadayoshi, 1580–1607) (season 1): Toranaga's impulsive yet adoring son
- Ako as Daiyoin / Lady Iyo (Kōdai-in, 1549–1624) (season 1): The wife of the late Taikō, who later became a Buddhist nun upon his death
- Hiromoto Ida as Kiyama ukon Sadanaga (Konishi Yukinaga, 1555–1600) (season 1): One of the five Regents, who converted to Catholicism due to the wealth the Portuguese acquired for him
- Toshi Toda as Sugiyama Josui (Maeda Toshiie, 1539–1599) (season 1): One of the five Regents, who is descended from a rich clan
- Takeshi Kurokawa as Ohno Harunobu (Otani Yoshitsugu, 1558–1600) (season 1): One of the five Regents, a once great warrior afflicted with leprosy, which drove him to become a devout Catholic
- Yuka Kouri as Kiku: A crafty and beguiling courtesan from Izu and Omi's concubine
- Hiro Kanagawa as Igarashi Yoshimito (season 1): An older samurai wearing an eyepatch who serves as Yabushige's general.
- Sen Mars as Nakamura Yaechiyo (Toyotomi Hideyori, 1593–1615) (season 1): The only son and heir of the Taikō
- Yuki Kedoin as Takemaru (season 1): A young samurai serving Yabushige
- Nobuya Shimamoto as Nebara Jozen (season 1): Ishido's loyal retainer and an old friend of Yabushige
- Yutaka Takeuchi as Akechi Jinsai (Akechi Mitsuhide, 1528–1582) (season 1): Mariko's late father and a powerful warlord who betrayed and killed Lord Kuroda Nobuhisa, tarnishing his family's legacy
- Shinnosuke Abe as Toda "Buntaro" Hirokatsu (Hosokawa Tadaoki, 1563–1646): Hiromatsu's son, Mariko's abusive husband, and a talented samurai serving Toranaga
- Louis Ferreira as Ferreira (season 1): The Portuguese captain-general of the Black Ship, the largest trade ship that handles commerce between the Portuguese Empire and Japan
- Paulino Nunes as Father Visitor Carlo Dell'Acqua, SJ (Alessandro Valignano, 1539–1606) (season 1): A senior Italian priest and the highest-ranking representative of the Catholic Church in Japan
- Yoriko Dōguchi as Kiri no Kata (Lady Acha, 1555–1637): Toranaga's wife
- Mako Fujimoto as Shizu no Kata (season 1): Toranaga's younger, pregnant consort
- Yuua Yamanaka as Toda Ryûji (Hosokawa Tadatoshi, 1586–1641) (season 1): Mariko and Buntaro's son
- Yuko Miyamoto as Gin: The madam of the Ajiro teahouse
- Eita Okuno as Saeki Nobutatsu (Matsudaira Iemoto, 1548–1603): Toranaga's half-brother and a powerful warlord
- Rick Kumazawa as Gaspar (season 2)

=== Guest ===
- Ned Dennehy as the Captain-General: The Dutch captain of the Erasmus, who committed suicide at sea
- Yuki Takao as Usami Tadayoshi: Fuji's impulsive husband and a samurai serving Toranaga
- Dakota Daulby as Salamon: A surviving crew member of the Erasmus who Blackthorne later encounters living in the slums of Edo. Unlike the novel where he is depicted as mute, he speaks to Blackthorne and directly confronts him.
- Joaquim de Almeida as Father Domingo: A Franciscan friar who befriended and lectured Blackthorne about Japanese politics
- Yukijiro Hotaru as Nakamura Hidetoshi, later the Taikō (Toyotomi Hideyoshi, 1537–1598): The retired Kampaku who appointed a council of five regents to succeed him until his heir comes of age
- Junichi Tajiri as Uejiro: An elderly gardener at Blackthorne's estate in Ajiro
- Eijiro Ozaki as Lord Kuroda Nobuhisa (Oda Nobunaga, 1534–1582): The former ruler of Japan and Ochiba's father, who was killed by Akechi Jinsai, Mariko's father, in 1578
- Takaaki Hirakawa as Mizoguchi: A warlord who was defeated during Toranaga's first battle in 1554
- Yoshi Amao as Sera: A samurai general based in Edo and one of Toranaga's vassals, who refuses to submit to the Regents
- Hitoshi Masaki as Tomono: A samurai general based in Edo and one of Toranaga's vassals, who refuses to submit to the Regents
- Haruka Igarashi (season 1) and Ryô Satô (season 2) as Rin (Lady Gō, 1573–1626): Toranaga's daughter-in-law and Ochiba's younger sister who lives in Edo
- Risei Kukihara as Gabriel (season 2)
- Seishirō Nishida as Jōshin (season 2)
- Mantaro Koichi as Saitō (season 2)
- Takashi Yamaguchi as Kanō (season 2)

== Episodes ==
No.	Title	Directed by	Written by	Original release date	U.S. viewers (millions)
1	"Anjin"; Transliteration: "Dai-ichi wa: Anjin" (Japanese: 第一話「安針」)	Jonathan van Tulleken	Rachel Kondo & Justin Marks	February 27, 2024	0.764
In 1600, the Taikō has recently died, leaving the rule split among five equal regents, who protect the Taikō's adolescent heir, Yaechiyo, at Osaka Castle. The Dutch trading ship Erasmus and its starving crew arrive at Ajiro on the Izu Peninsula, in the southern domains of Edo; the survivors, including English pilot John Blackthorne, are taken prisoner by local samurai. The entrenched Portuguese traders and the Catholic Church's Jesuit order are the political and religious rivals of the Protestant Blackthorne. The local Jesuit priest attempts to have Blackthorne executed, claiming him to be a pirate, but the fief's ruler, Kashigi Yabushige, dismisses the request and plans to use the Erasmus and its weapons to his benefit. At Osaka Castle, four regents, led by Lord Ishido Kazunari, initiate the process to impeach and thereby condemn to death the fifth regent, Yoshii Toranaga. Following a spy's report, Toranaga's general, Toda Hiromatsu, confiscates the Erasmus and its cargo before bringing Blackthorne to Osaka. En route, Blackthorne takes command of the ship during a storm when the Spanish navigator Rodrigues is washed overboard, and Rodrigues is saved by Blackthorne and Yabushige. Blackthorne is then taken to Osaka Castle, where he meets Toranaga and Lady Toda Mariko.
2	"Servants of Two Masters"; Transliteration: "Dai-ni wa: Futari no Shukun ni Tsukaete" (Japanese: 第二話「二人の主君に仕えて」)	Jonathan van Tulleken	Rachel Kondo & Justin Marks	February 27, 2024	0.764
In 1598, the Taikō, on his deathbed, privately informs Toranaga of his intention to form a council of regents to succeed him, but warns that it will likely result in civil war. In 1600, Blackthorne's confiscated journals are given to the Jesuits by Rodrigues. Blackthorne meets with Toranaga, with Mariko and the Jesuit priest Martin Alvito as interpreters, but is interrupted by Ishido. Toranaga feigns disinterest and has Blackthorne imprisoned, hoping to use his presence to sow division between Ishido and the Christian regents. In prison, Blackthorne meets a friar who informs him that the Portuguese Black Ship has been taking profits from the silk trade back to Europe using a secret military base in Macao. The Christian regents inform Ishido that they will only vote on Toranaga's impeachment if Blackthorne is executed, and Yabushige convinces Ishido that Blackthorne could be useful. Yabushige and his samurai stage a bandit attack and rescue Blackthorne from execution. At Blackthorne's second meeting, with Mariko interpreting, he explains that Portugal and Spain have divided the world among themselves and intend to replace all non-Catholic governments. That night, a shinobi attempts to assassinate Blackthorne but is killed by Toranaga, who had secretly switched their rooms.
3	"Tomorrow Is Tomorrow"; Transliteration: "Dai-san wa: Asu wa Asu" (Japanese: 第三話「明日は明日」)	Charlotte Brändström	Shannon Goss	March 5, 2024	0.492
Toranaga instructs Yabushige to move Blackthorne to Ajiro along with Toranaga's wife Kiri. Ferreira, captain-general of the Black Ship, disregards the Jesuits' concerns and plans to sail without Toranaga's permission. At Osaka Castle, Ishido inspects Yabushige's caravan under the guise of paying respects. Blackthorne and Mariko witness Toranaga secretly changing places with Kiri in her litter. Mariko explains that they will be killed if this is discovered, and Blackthorne creates a distraction, enabling them to leave the castle. Regent Kiyama's men later attack the caravan and discover Toranaga. Toranaga's party escapes to a galley as Mariko's husband Toda "Buntaro" Hirokatsu stays behind to stall pursuit. The harbor is blocked by Kiyama's men and Toranaga boards the Black Ship, striking a deal with the Portuguese in exchange for safe passage. Ferreira requires Blackthorne to be left behind, but he daringly follows in the galley and rejoins once both ships have broken the blockade. At sea, Toranaga makes Blackthorne a hatamoto and asks him to teach Western tactics to a new regiment. In Osaka, Hiromatsu informs the regents that Toranaga has resigned, leaving them without a quorum to vote on impeachment.
4	"The Eightfold Fence"; Transliteration: "Dai-yon wa: Yaegaki" (Japanese: 第四話「八重垣」)	Frederick E. O. Toye	Nigel Williams & Emily Yoshida	March 12, 2024	0.517
Toranaga inspects Yabushige's army in Ajiro and departs for Edo. Mariko informs Blackthorne that his crew are in Edo and that they and the Erasmus now belong to Toranaga. Blackthorne is given a home, a good salary, and Usami Fuji, Hiromatsu's granddaughter, as his consort in exchange for training Yabushige's army for six months. Yabushige's nephew, Kashigi Omi, suggests to Yabushige that, in Toranaga's absence, Yabushige can offer the confiscated weapons from the Erasmus to Ishido. Ishido's retainer, Nebara Jozen, arrives and tells Yabushige to return to Osaka and pledge his loyalty to the remaining regents. Knowing that this will likely end in his death, Yabushige invites Jozen to stay the night and witness a demonstration of the cannons the next day. At dinner, Blackthorne gives Fuji one of his guns as a token of gratitude and she gives him her late father's swords. Mariko sneaks into Blackthorne's room at night and sleeps with him, later pretending that she and Fuji had hired a courtesan. The next day, during the demonstration, Toranaga's son Nagakado takes matters into his own hands and kills Jozen and his retinue with chain shots from the cannons, much to Yabushige's chagrin. The episode is dedicated to the memory of technical advisor and cannon expert Larry Beckett.
5	"Broken to the Fist"; Transliteration: "Dai-go wa: Chichi no Ikari" (Japanese: 第五話「父の怒り」)	Frederick E. O. Toye	Matt Lambert	March 19, 2024	0.554
Toranaga returns to Ajiro with his army. Learning that Nagakado killed Jozen, he takes away his command of the cannon regiment, giving it to Omi. Buntaro returns from Osaka and moves in with Blackthorne and Mariko. During dinner, Blackthorne and Buntaro engage in a sake drinking binge. A drunken Buntaro forces Mariko to tell Blackthorne about her father, Akechi Jinsai, who murdered the predecessor of the Taikō. He was forced to execute his family before committing seppuku. Mariko was already married to Buntaro and for this reason was spared the same fate as her family.Later that night, Mariko is assaulted by Buntaro. Blackthorne confronts him outside, but Buntaro lays down his sword and apologizes for disturbing his home. Blackthorne later asks Toranaga for permission to permanently leave Japan, but after an earthquake buries Toranaga in a landslide, Blackthorne saves him. The following day, Muraji manages to convince Yabushige and Omi that the gardener Uejiro, who had been executed for disobeying an order from Blackthorne, was the spy they were searching for. In Osaka, the remaining regents attempt to decide who will take Toranaga's place on the council, but Ochiba soon arrives and reunites with her son Yaechiyo before telling Ishido that the council will now listen to her.
6	"Ladies of the Willow World"; Transliteration: "Dai-roku wa: Utakata no Onnatachi" (Japanese: 第六話「うたかたの女たち」)	Hiromi Kamata	Maegan Houang	March 26, 2024	0.523
In 1578, Mariko is living at the home of warlord Kuroda Nobuhisa. She becomes friends with his daughter, the future Ochiba, and witnesses Nobuhisa executing her father's allies. In 1600, Toranaga bestows Blackthorne with an admiralty and a fief, and Blackthorne's request to leave Japan is denied. Toranaga reveals to Mariko that Jinsai wanted her to continue his work of protecting Japan. At Osaka Castle, the remaining three regents and their families have been taken hostage by Ochiba and Ishido, under the pretense that there is a plot to kill Yaechiyo. Hiromatsu escapes but must leave the others behind. Ochiba believes Toranaga plotted her father's death, and she and Ishido offer Ito, an influential warlord, a seat on the council. Regent Sugiyama refuses to confirm Ito and tries to flee Osaka with his family but Ishido and his men kill them. Hiromatsu reaches Ajiro and informs Toranaga of the situation in Osaka. Toranaga's war council wants to use his secret Crimson Sky plan to defeat Ishido. Toranaga refuses, understanding that this will most likely make him the new shōgun. When news of Sugiyama's death reaches Ajiro, Toranaga realizes that his impeachment is inevitable and invokes Crimson Sky to protect Yaechiyo and limit future bloodshed.
7	"A Stick of Time"; Transliteration: "Dai-nana wa: Senkō Ippon no Toki" (Japanese: 第七話「線香一本の時」)	Takeshi Fukunaga	Matt Lambert	April 2, 2024	0.540
In 1554, a young Toranaga achieves his first victory in a battle against the warlord Mizoguchi, who commits seppuku. In 1600, Toranaga meets his estranged half-brother, Saeki Nobutatsu, to discuss terms of merging their two armies to invade Osaka as part of Crimson Sky. Saeki reveals he has been offered the fifth regency in place of Sugiyama, and Toranaga must either surrender to the council in Osaka or face imminent war. Saeki also informs Yabushige that his general has been executed, ending his chance of successfully playing both sides. Toranaga refuses Buntaro's request to kill Blackthorne, and Mariko's request to be allowed to die. Toranaga informs Saeki of his intention to surrender and declares there will be no Crimson Sky, despite protests from Nagakado and Yabushige. Kiku and Nagakado conspire to kill Saeki at Ajiro's teahouse. Saeki attempts to flee the ambush but trips into the teahouse's pond. However, as Nagakado attempts to kill Saeki, the former slips and fatally hits his head on a rock.
8	"The Abyss of Life"; Transliteration: "Dai-hachi wa: Naraku no Soko" (Japanese: 第八話「奈落の底」)	Emmanuel Osei-Kuffour	Shannon Goss	April 9, 2024	0.436
Toranaga and his army travel to Edo to prepare for Nagakado's funeral and 49 days of mourning. Ishido proposes marriage to Ochiba to strengthen their alliance. Alvito suggests to Toranaga that he should ally with Ochiba and overthrow Ishido, but Toranaga tells the priest to inform Ishido that he will formally surrender. Buntaro and Mariko have a tea ceremony, where he proposes that they commit suicide to protest Toranaga's surrender, but Mariko refuses. Blackthorne visits his former shipmates, and Salamon confronts him about his piloting decisions that brought them to Japan. Blackthorne then offers his services to Yabushige, who initially refuses. Daiyoin, the wife of the late Taikō, suffers a stroke and begs Ochiba to end her hostilities and release the hostages before dying. Toranaga's vassals sign their names to a formal letter of surrender, but Hiromatsu commits seppuku in defiance. Toranaga reveals to Mariko that Hiromatsu committed suicide to make his enemies believe his defeat was real. Yabushige is thus convinced and accepts Blackthorne's services. Toranaga asks Mariko to travel on his behalf to Osaka. The next morning, at the resting place of his son, Toranaga thanks Nagakado and Hiromatsu and vows not to waste the time they bought him.
9	"Crimson Sky"; Transliteration: "Dai-kyū wa: Kōten" (Japanese: 第九話「紅天」)	Frederick E. O. Toye	Rachel Kondo & Caillin Puente	April 16, 2024	0.538
Blackthorne, Mariko, and Yabushige arrive in Osaka to surrender to Ishido on Toranaga's behalf. Yabushige requests that Ishido spare his life in exchange for his servitude but is denied. Mariko demands to leave the city with Toranaga's family at his request, but during her attempt to leave, the guards overpower her, so she announces that she will take her own life at sunset. Ochiba meets with Mariko in secret and recounts their childhood together in an attempt to make her surrender peacefully, but she refuses. Mariko soon prepares to commit seppuku, with Blackthorne agreeing to be her second, but Ishido stops her and grants her permission to leave. Later that night, Blackthorne and Mariko profess their love for each other. Ishido agrees to spare Yabushige who allows an army of shinobi to infiltrate the castle, but Blackthorne prevents them from kidnapping Mariko. Amid the chaos, Blackthorne, Mariko, Yabushige, and Toranaga's consorts lock themselves in a storehouse. After the shinobi set up explosives to blow open the door, Mariko willingly stands in front of it to defy Ishido and, to Blackthorne's horror, is killed by the explosion.
10	"A Dream of a Dream"; Transliteration: "Dai-jū wa: Yume no Naka no Yume" (Japanese: 第十話「夢の中の夢」)	Frederick E. O. Toye	Maegan Houang & Emily Yoshida	April 23, 2024	0.625
In the aftermath of the assault on Osaka Castle, Mariko is buried and the Council unanimously votes to declare war on Toranaga. Blackthorne leaves Osaka with Yabushige and Toranaga's consorts, having learned from Alvito that Mariko persuaded the Church to spare his life. Upon arriving in Ajiro, they discover that the Erasmus has been destroyed and Toranaga's men ruthlessly hunt for suspected traitors. Yabushige is arrested and confesses to having aided Ishido; Toranaga orders Yabushige to commit seppuku the following day. Blackthorne reunites with Fuji who informs him that she has been relieved of her duties and plans to become a nun. The next day, Blackthorne implores Toranaga to spare Ajiro and threatens to commit seppuku, but Toranaga stops him and orders the construction of a fleet of ships. Toranaga later confesses to Yabushige that he ordered the destruction of the Erasmus to keep Blackthorne from leaving Japan and that Mariko's death helped convince Ochiba to withdraw her support from Ishido ahead of the future Battle of Sekigahara. After Toranaga refuses to divulge the entirety of his plan, Yabushige carries out his sentence and commits seppuku. With the help of Buntaro and the villagers, Blackthorne begins efforts to salvage the Erasmus as Toranaga observes from afar.

== Production ==
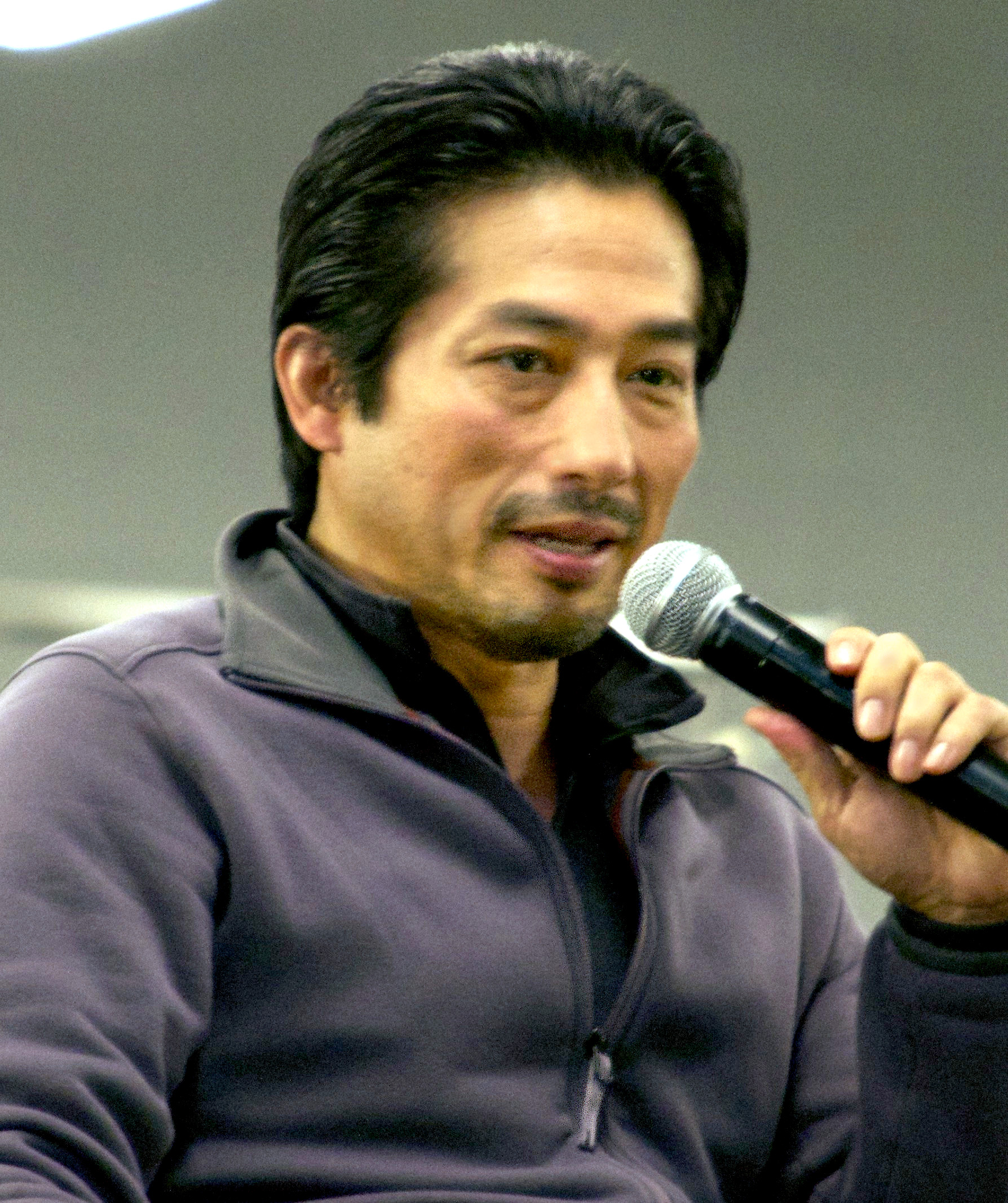
Hiroyuki Sanada, one of the producers of the series, portrays Lord Yoshii Toranaga.

=== Development ===
During the Television Critics Association's annual summer press tour in August 2018, FX announced it would make a new adaptation of the 1975 novel Shōgun by James Clavell and had given the production a straight-to-series order. Executive producers were expected to include Andrew Macdonald, Allon Reich, Michael De Luca, Michaela Clavell, Tim Van Patten, Eugene Kelly, and Ronan Bennett. Rachel Bennette is set as a supervising producer, Tom Winchester as a producer, Georgina Pope as a co-producer, and Eriko Miyagawa as an associate producer. Van Patten also directed the series and Bennett also wrote. FX Productions serves as the production company for the series. Hiroyuki Sanada serves as a producer and lead actor.

In an interview with USA Today, Sanada described his role as a producer, saying "After twenty years in Hollywood, I'm a producer. It means I can say anything, anytime. [...] I had a team for the first time, ever. I carried the pressure of being a producer on my shoulder. But more than that, I had happiness." He also stressed keeping the show authentic to Japanese history. "If something is incorrect, people cannot focus on the drama. They don't want to see that kind of show. We needed to be authentic." Sanada had questioned the viability of a primarily Japanese-language series, feeling it was a "gamble". Marks joked that he did not understand why the network had greenlit "a very expensive sub-titled Japanese period piece whose central climax revolves around a poetry competition."

Initially conceived as a miniseries, its success led FX to announce in May 2024 that a second and third season were officially announced to be in development, with the writer's room assembling in mid-2024. In November 2025, the new and returning cast were announced for the second season, with Sanada confirmed to reprise his role and executive produce. Cosmo Jarvis, Tommy Bastow, Fumi Nikaidô, Hiroto Kanai, Yuka Kouri, Shinnosuke Abe, Yoriko Dōguchi, Yuko Miyamoto, and Eita Okuno were also confirmed to reprise their roles from the first season while Asami Mizukawa, Masataka Kubota, Sho Kaneta, Takaaki Enoki, Jun Kunimura, and Ren Meguro were announced to have joined the cast. In March 2026, Risei Kukihara, Ryô Satô, Seishirō Nishida, Mantaro Koichi, and Takashi Yamaguchi joined the cast. In July 2026, Rick Kumazawa joined the cast.

=== Filming ===
Principal photography for the series was scheduled to commence in March 2019 in Japan and the United Kingdom but was delayed because the network felt that the production was not "in good enough shape". Sanada did a single day of filming in 2019 in order for FX to retain the rights to the property as the series was being retooled.

In January 2020, it was revealed that after original writer Ronan Bennett became unavailable, they started over with new writer and executive producer Justin Marks and supervising producer Rachel Kondo. The writing team included co-executive producer Shannon Goss, consulting producer Matt Lambert, script editor Maegan Houang, and staff writer Emily Yoshida.

Principal photography for the first season began in Vancouver, British Columbia on September 22, 2021, and lasted until June 30, 2022, taking two months longer than expected. Filming took place in locations around southern British Columbia, including the cities of Vancouver, Port Moody, and Coquitlam, and Ucluelet on Vancouver Island. Speaking to Yahoo Canada, Sanada praised Canada, "especially Vancouver," for being "a perfect place to make a samurai drama because they had a big, great, beautiful studio, and then 30 minutes drive from the studio they have everything, forest, river, beach, parks, mountains." Jarvis added, "our Canadian crew exhibited a technical proficiency that I've never witnessed in my life." Altogether, around 340 crew worked on the show.

Nikkan Gendai reported that Japanese extras were paid 50,000 yen per day, which is much higher than a Japanese production where they are paid between zero yen to 5,000 yen a day. A Japanese white pine tree used on set was donated and planted after filming to the City Hall of Port Moody.

Principal photography for the second season began on February 2, 2026 in Vancouver, British Columbia, and wrapped up on October 6.

=== Visual effects ===
Certain post-production visual effects were produced in Ireland.

=== Music ===
The score was composed by Academy Award winner Atticus Ross, Leopold Ross, and Nick Chuba. Taro Ishida contributed by arranging and recording traditional Japanese music, including Gagaku, to integrate these authentic elements into the soundtrack. The team aimed to create a soundscape that blends ancient and modern elements, using advanced sonic manipulation to enhance the psychological depth of the story.

Chart performance for Shōgun (Original Soundtrack)
Chart (2024)	Peak position
UK Soundtrack Albums (OCC)	14

== Marketing ==
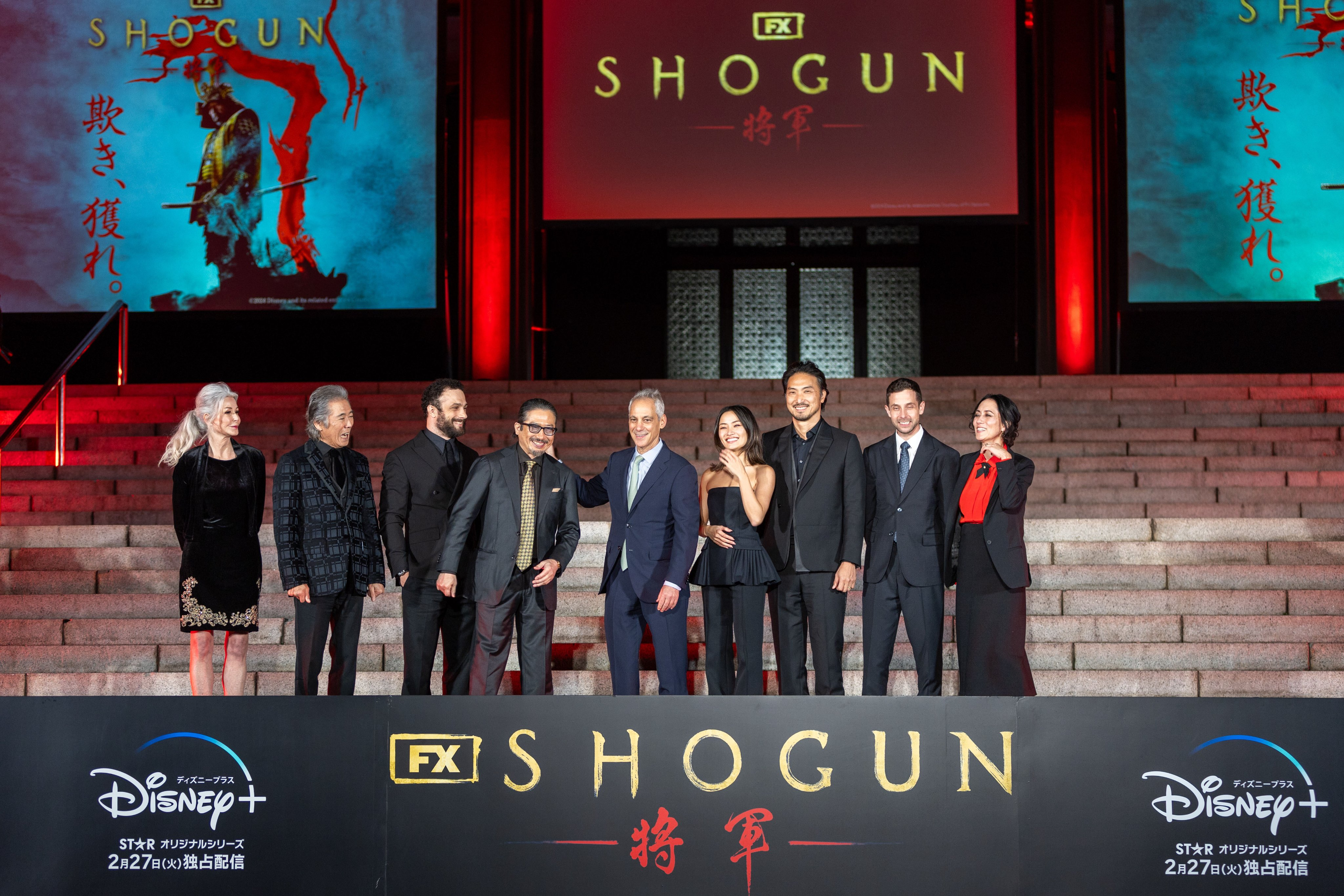
Event at Zōjō-ji, Tokyo. Hiroyuki Sanada, Cosmo Jarvis, Anna Sawai and others attended.

To promote the series, an immersive exhibition of the series occurred at FX Lawn during San Diego Comic Con in July 2023. These included samurai performances and a virtual koi pond. On September 5, 2023, the series was teased in a showcase of upcoming FX television shows. On November 2, 2023, the show's first trailer debuted on YouTube, which revealed that the series would be released in February 2024 on FX on Hulu. A 30-second trailer for the series aired during the second-quarter of Super Bowl LVIII on February 11, 2024. Bill Bradley of Adweek wrote "The series has been in the works for years and is already the most expensive in FX history, so what's another $7 million-ish for an ad?"

== Release ==
Shōgun premiered with its first two episodes on February 27, 2024, on FX on Hulu and FX. The remainder of the ten-episode first season was released weekly. Internationally, the series was available on Disney+ and Star+ in Latin America and Disney+ in other territories. An English dub of the series was available on Hulu. A companion podcast hosted by Shōgun staff writer Emily Yoshida was also released for each episode.

== Reception ==
=== Critical response ===
Professional ratings
Aggregate scores
Source	Rating
Metacritic	85/100
Rotten Tomatoes	99%
Review scores
Source	Rating
Chicago Sun-Times	3.5/4 stars
The Daily Telegraph	4/5 stars
Empire	4/5 stars
Entertainment Weekly	A–
Evening Standard	4/5 stars
The Financial Times	4/5 stars
The Guardian	4/5 stars
Indiewire	A–
San Francisco Chronicle	4/4 stars
The Times	4/5 stars
RogerEbert.com	3.5/4 stars
USA Today	3.5/4 stars

Shōgun received critical acclaim in the United States and Japan. On review aggregator Rotten Tomatoes, 99% of 137 critics gave the series a positive review, with an average rating of 8.7/10. The site's critical consensus reads: "Visually sumptuous and enriched with cultural verisimilitude, Shōgun is an epic adaptation that outdoes the original." On Metacritic, the series holds a weighted average score of 85 out of 100 based on 41 critics, indicating "universal acclaim".

Rebecca Nicholson of The Guardian praised the show, calling it "mesmerising" and especially praised the battle sequences and its respect for the source material. Writing for The New York Times, Mike Hale compared the show to the 1980 adaptation, writing "You can correct for wooden acting, dated production values and Eurocentrism, but you can't really correct for the basic nature of the material." He especially praised the show for highlighting more of the Japanese characters than in the 1980 adaptation, which focused more on Blackthorne. His only complaints were Cosmo Jarvis's more neutral portrayal of Blackthorne and the Western-written source material. Forbes described the show as an "instant hit" and praised Jarvis' portrayal of Blackthorne, stating "I'm immediately drawn to his character because he's not just some good guy, some white savior or what have you. He's smart but he's also calculating and ruthless."

Empire headlined their review by Jake Cunningham with "Shōgun makes for gripping television. Look past the knotty bureaucracy and you'll find striking performances and stunning visuals", highlighting the intricate performances of its lead trio. He describes Jarvis as "compelling" and "magnetic", Hiroyuki Sanada as a "subdued lord [who] ripples with menace, micro-expressions of warfaring arithmetic revealing his tactical mind" and Anna Sawai as "a character torn in duty and spirituality, cloaked in a performance of stoicism." The Hollywood Reporter also praised the supporting cast, notably Moeka Hoshi, Tadanobu Asano, Fumi Nikaido, Shinnosuke Abe and Tokuma Nishioka for their strong character work. IGN described some of the supporting cast as "stand-out", praising Néstor Carbonell as Rodrigues and Tadanobu Asano as Yabushige next to Jarvis' Blackthorne, "a force to be reckoned with." Emmanuel Ronquillo of Collider also highlighted the "understated but expressive performance" of Moeka Hoshi in the show. Mike Cormack of PopMatters however was less enthusiastic and criticized the depiction of Japanese culture, saying that "by trying so hard to avoid the taint of cultural imperialism, the 2024 adaptation actually lapses into its mirror image: cultural chauvinism. Clavell's Shōgun is about the dirt and grit of humanity; the new version, in its anxiety to be virtuous, preserves a culture in aspic."

Series creators Rachel Kondo and Justin Marks's adaptation of the novel also received positive responses, with Daniel Fienberg from The Hollywood Reporter stating that "this Shōgun finds much more traction as an ambitious game of political chess." IGN writes "Creators Justin Marks and Rachel Kondo have crafted a version of feudal Japan filled with visual splendor, brutality, and intrigue" while remaining "highly faithful to James Clavell's bestselling novel". For Variety, Alison Herman attributes the show's success to "creators Justin Marks and Rachel Kondo [having] tapped into the true secret sauce of epic television: a balance between sweeping grandeur and intimate psychology."

=== Streaming viewership ===
Shōgun drew 9 million views across Hulu, Disney+, and Star+ in its first six days of release. Nielsen Media Research, which records streaming viewership on U.S. television screens, estimated that it was viewed for 422 million minutes during the week of March 25–31. Viewership increased to 434 million minutes for the week of April 1–7. It further rose to 608 million minutes for the week of April 22–28. According to market research company Parrot Analytics, which looks at consumer engagement in consumer research, streaming, downloads, and on social media, Shōgun saw impressive demand in its second week, peaking at 48 times the average series. Luminate, which gathers viewership data from smart TVs in the U.S., reported that Shōgun experienced a 111% increase in streaming minutes in the week following the 2024 Emmy nominations, making it the second-highest growth among all Outstanding Drama Series nominees.

Analytics company Samba TV, which gathers viewership data from certain smart TVs and content providers, announced that Shōgun was the most-streamed program across all platforms between February 26 and March 3. It was also the most-streamed program across all platforms during its second week. TheWrap noted that Shōgun was one of the few non-Netflix series to have a back-to-back number one ranking. The streaming aggregator Reelgood, which tracks 20 million monthly viewing decisions across all U.S. streaming platforms for original and acquired content on SVOD and AVOD services, reported Shōgun was the most-streamed program through March 6. JustWatch, a guide to streaming content with access to data from more than 20 million users around the world, estimated that Shōgun was the most-streamed series in Canada and in the United States from March 4–10. JustWatch later revealed that Shōgun was the top-streamed show in Canada and in the United States during 2024. According to the file-sharing news website TorrentFreak, Shōgun was the third most-watched pirated television series of 2024.

=== Reception in Japan ===
Shōgun was received with acclaim by Japanese audiences on Eiga.com. Japanese comedian and history buff Kunihiro Matsumura also praised the series for its authenticity. Ken Matsudaira, who played Tokugawa Yoshimune in The Unfettered Shogun and played Tokugawa Ieyasu (the real-life model for Yoshii Toranaga) three times in his acting career, praised Sanada's skilled acting and his effort to bring more historical authenticity to the series as a producer. In an interview with The Hollywood Reporter, Sanada expressed his thoughts on the show's Japanese reception: "I was a little worried about the Japanese reaction because they know what is authentic, and what is not. But surprisingly, all the reviews and the reactions from the audience were great. That was exactly what we wanted."

Video game designer Hideo Kojima, known for founding Kojima Productions, likened the series to "a Game of Thrones set in 17th-century Japan", and praised its scale, details, cast, costumes, sets, props, and VFX, as well as citing star and producer Hiroyuki Sanada's presence in the series.

== Legacy ==
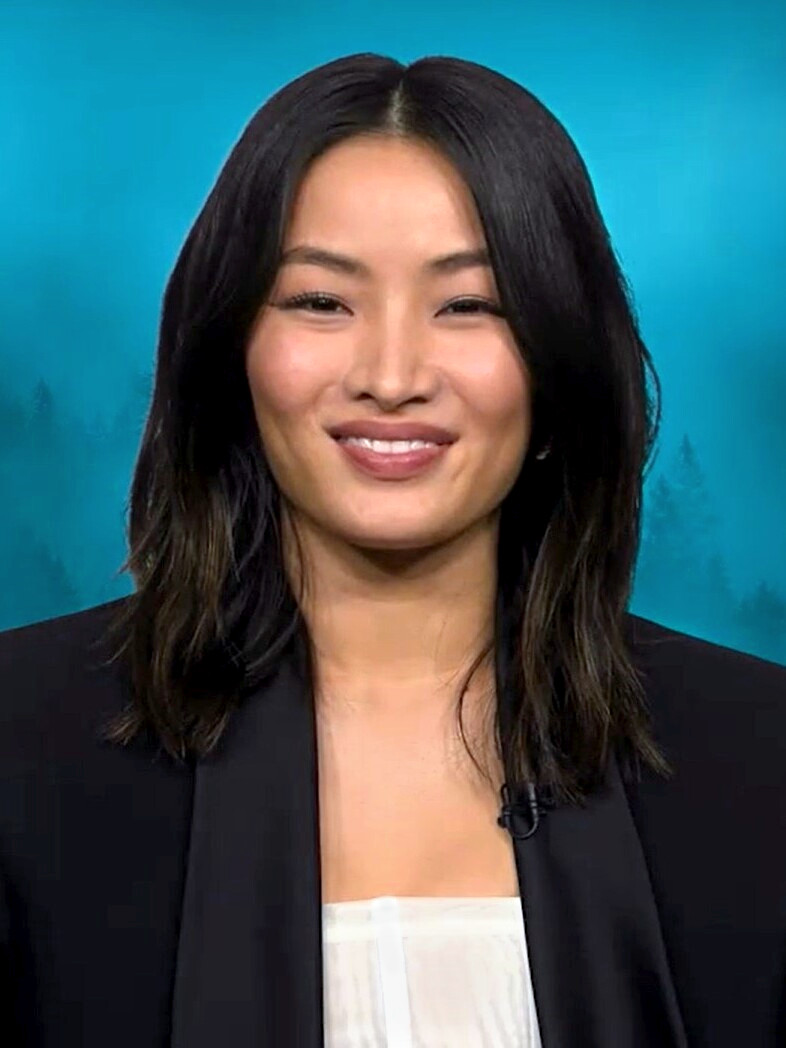
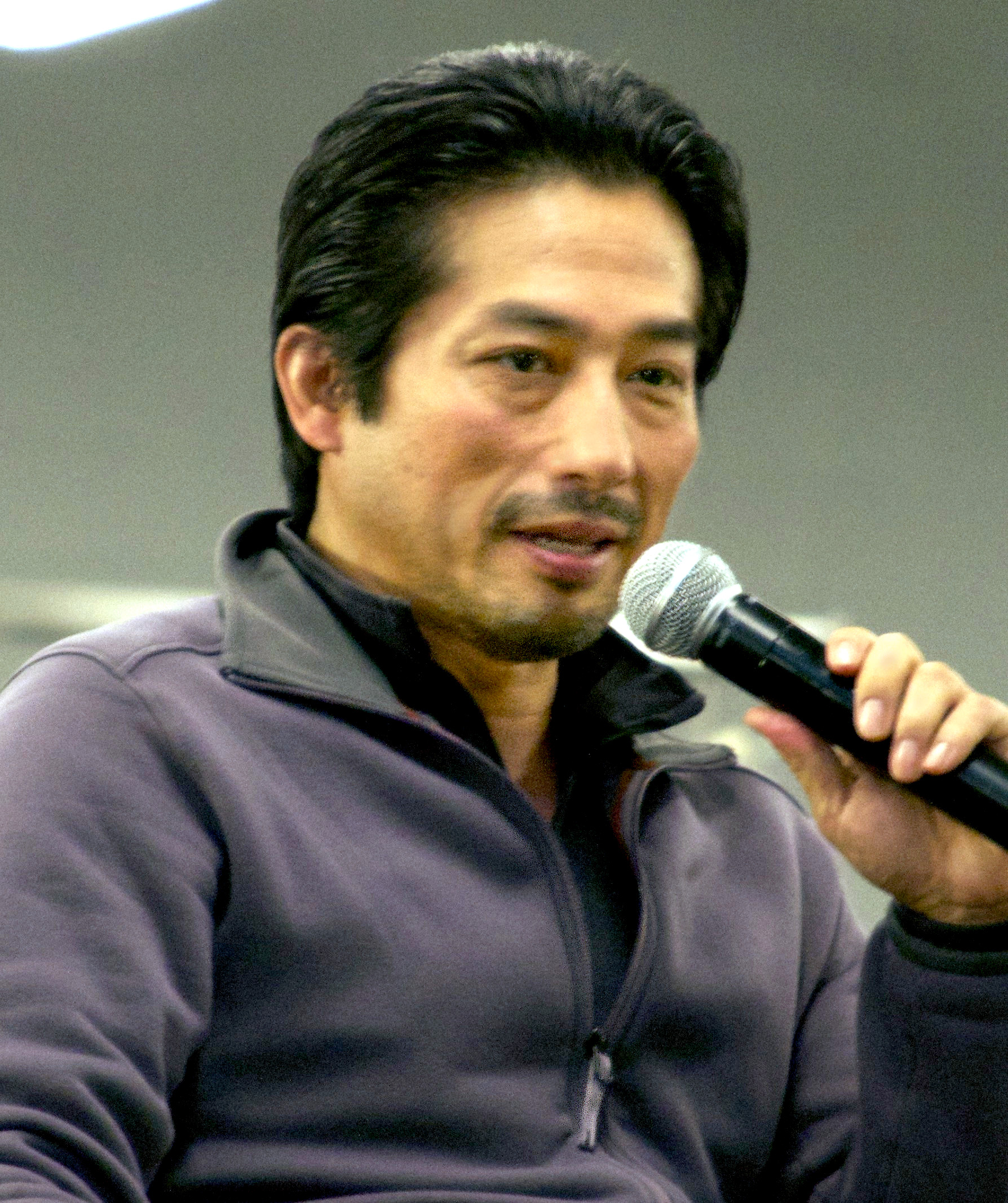
Anna Sawai's performance as Toda Mariko and Hiroyuki Sanada's performance as Lord Yoshii Toranaga garnered unanimous acclaim.

The first season of the show was a major influence on Japanese artist Takashi Murakami for his 2024 Gagosian show Japanese Art History à la Takashi Murakami. IGN named the series the best TV show of 2024. Sawai's performance was additionally included in Variety's "100 Greatest TV Performances of the 21st Century", writing that "there were scenes in which Sawai communicated a chasm of yearning, rancor and guilt through a flicker in her eyes. So when her facade finally did crack wide open, we felt every bit of the emotion that was unleashed."

Shōgun became the second non-English language series to be nominated for Outstanding Drama Series after Squid Game in 2022, as well as the first to win. Anna Sawai and Hiroyuki Sanada's performances won them Primetime Emmy Awards for Outstanding Lead Actress in a Drama Series and Outstanding Lead Actor in a Drama Series, respectively. With their wins, both became the first Japanese performers to win said categories. Additionally, Sawai also became the first Asian to win her category, while Sanada became the second Asian to do so in his category after Lee Jung-jae for his role in Squid Game in 2022.

== Accolades ==
Award	Date of ceremony	Category	Nominee(s)	Result	Ref.
Gotham TV Awards	June 4, 2024	Breakthrough Limited Series	Shōgun	Nominated	
Gotham TV Awards	June 4, 2024	Outstanding Performance in a Limited Series	Hiroyuki Sanada	Nominated	
Gotham TV Awards	June 4, 2024	Outstanding Performance in a Limited Series	Anna Sawai	Nominated	
Television Critics Association Awards	July 12, 2024	Program of the Year	Shōgun	Won	
Television Critics Association Awards	July 12, 2024	Outstanding Achievement in Drama	Shōgun	Won	
Television Critics Association Awards	July 12, 2024	Outstanding New Program	Shōgun	Won	
Television Critics Association Awards	July 12, 2024	Individual Achievement in Drama	Hiroyuki Sanada	Nominated	
Television Critics Association Awards	July 12, 2024	Individual Achievement in Drama	Anna Sawai	Won	
Set Decorators Society of America Awards	August 5, 2024	Best Achievement in Décor/Design of a One Hour Period Series	Lisa Lancaster, Jonathan Lancaster, Helen Jarvis	Nominated	
Primetime Creative Arts Emmy Awards	September 8, 2024	Outstanding Guest Actor in a Drama Series	Néstor Carbonell (for "Anjin")	Won	
Primetime Creative Arts Emmy Awards	September 8, 2024	Outstanding Casting for a Drama Series	Laura Schiff, Carrie Audino, Kei Kawamura, Maureen Webb, and Colleen Bolton	Won	
Primetime Creative Arts Emmy Awards	September 8, 2024	Outstanding Cinematography for a Series (One Hour)	Christopher Ross (for "Anjin")	Nominated	
Primetime Creative Arts Emmy Awards	September 8, 2024	Outstanding Cinematography for a Series (One Hour)	Sam McCurdy (for "Crimson Sky")	Won	
Primetime Creative Arts Emmy Awards	September 8, 2024	Outstanding Period Costumes for a Series	Carlos Rosario, Carole Griffin, Kristen Bond, Kenichi Tanaka, and Paula Plachy (for "Ladies of the Willow World")	Won	
Primetime Creative Arts Emmy Awards	September 8, 2024	Outstanding Period and/or Character Hairstyling	Sanna Kaarina Seppanen, Mariah Crawley, Madison Gillespie, Nakry Keo, and Janis Bekkering (for "A Stick of Time")	Won	
Primetime Creative Arts Emmy Awards	September 8, 2024	Outstanding Main Title Design	Nadia Tzuo, Mike Zeng, Alex Silver, Lee Buckley, Ilya Tselyutin, and Evan Larimore	Won	
Primetime Creative Arts Emmy Awards	September 8, 2024	Outstanding Period or Fantasy/Sci-Fi Makeup (Non-Prosthetic)	Rebecca Lee, Krystal Devlin, Amber Trudeau, Andrea Alcala, Leslie Graham, Krista Hann, Mike Fields, and Emily Walsh (for "The Abyss of Life")	Won	
Primetime Creative Arts Emmy Awards	September 8, 2024	Outstanding Prosthetic Makeup	Toby Lindala, Bree-Anna Lehto, and Suzie Klimack (for "A Dream of a Dream")	Won	
Primetime Creative Arts Emmy Awards	September 8, 2024	Outstanding Music Composition for a Series (Original Dramatic Score)	Atticus Ross, Leopold Ross, and Nick Chuba (for "Servants of Two Masters")	Nominated	
Primetime Creative Arts Emmy Awards	September 8, 2024	Outstanding Original Main Title Theme Music	Atticus Ross, Leopold Ross, and Nick Chuba	Nominated	
Primetime Creative Arts Emmy Awards	September 8, 2024	Outstanding Picture Editing for a Drama Series	Maria Gonzales and Aika Miyake (for "A Dream of a Dream")	Won	
Primetime Creative Arts Emmy Awards	September 8, 2024	Outstanding Production Design for a Narrative Period or Fantasy Program (One Hour or More)	Helen Jarvis, Chris Beach, Lisa Lancaster, and Jonathan Lancaster (for "Anjin")	Won	
Primetime Creative Arts Emmy Awards	September 8, 2024	Outstanding Sound Editing for a Comedy or Drama Series (One-Hour)	Brian J Armstrong, Benjamin Cook, James Gallivan, John Creed, Ayako Yamauchi, Mark Hailstone, Ken Cain, Melissa Muik, Matt Salib, and Sanaa Kelley (for "Broken to the Fist")	Won	
Primetime Creative Arts Emmy Awards	September 8, 2024	Outstanding Sound Mixing for a Comedy or Drama Series (One-Hour)	Steve Pederson, Greg P. Russell, Michael Williamson, Takashi Akaku, and Arno Stephanian (for "Broken to the Fist")	Won	
Primetime Creative Arts Emmy Awards	September 8, 2024	Outstanding Special Visual Effects in a Season or a Movie	Michael Cliett, Melody Mead, Jed Glassford, Cameron Waldbauer, Philip Engström, Chelsea Mirus, Ed Bruce, Nicholas Murphy, and Kyle Rottman	Won	
Primetime Creative Arts Emmy Awards	September 8, 2024	Outstanding Stunt Performance	Hiroo Minami, Nobuyuki Obikane, Martin Cochingco, and Johnson Phan (for "The Eightfold Fence")	Won	
Primetime Emmy Awards	September 15, 2024	Outstanding Drama Series	Justin Marks, Michaela Clavell, Edward L. McDonnell, Michael De Luca, Rachel Kondo, Shannon Goss, Jamie Vega Wheeler, Hiroyuki Sanada, Eriko Miyagawa, Erin Smith, and Matt Lambert	Won	
Primetime Emmy Awards	September 15, 2024	Outstanding Lead Actor in a Drama Series	Hiroyuki Sanada (for "The Abyss of Life")	Won	
Primetime Emmy Awards	September 15, 2024	Outstanding Lead Actress in a Drama Series	Anna Sawai (for "Crimson Sky")	Won	
Primetime Emmy Awards	September 15, 2024	Outstanding Supporting Actor in a Drama Series	Tadanobu Asano (for "Anjin")	Nominated	
Primetime Emmy Awards	September 15, 2024	Outstanding Supporting Actor in a Drama Series	Takehiro Hira (for "Crimson Sky")	Nominated	
Primetime Emmy Awards	September 15, 2024	Outstanding Directing for a Drama Series	Frederick E. O. Toye (for "Crimson Sky")	Won	
Primetime Emmy Awards	September 15, 2024	Outstanding Writing for a Drama Series	Rachel Kondo and Justin Marks (for "Anjin")	Nominated	
Primetime Emmy Awards	September 15, 2024	Outstanding Writing for a Drama Series	Rachel Kondo and Caillin Puente (for "Crimson Sky")	Nominated	
Hawaii International Film Festival	October 12, 2024	Halekulani Golden Maile Career Achievement Award	Rachel Kondo and Justin Marks	Won	
Asia Society Game Changer Awards	November 12, 2024	Game Changer Award	Shōgun	Won	
Hollywood Music in Media Awards	November 20, 2024	Best Original Score – TV Show/Limited Series	Atticus Ross, Leopold Ross & Nick Chuba	Won	
Astra TV Awards	December 8, 2024	Best Streaming Drama Series	Shōgun	Won	
Astra TV Awards	December 8, 2024	Best Actor in a Streaming Drama Series	Cosmo Jarvis	Nominated	
Astra TV Awards	December 8, 2024	Best Actor in a Streaming Drama Series	Hiroyuki Sanada	Won	
Astra TV Awards	December 8, 2024	Best Actress in a Streaming Drama Series	Anna Sawai	Won	
Astra TV Awards	December 8, 2024	Best Guest Actress in a Drama Series	Yuko Miyamoto	Nominated	
Astra TV Awards	December 8, 2024	Best Directing in a Streaming Drama Series	Jonathan van Tulleken (for "Anjin")	Nominated	
Astra TV Awards	December 8, 2024	Best Writing in a Streaming Drama Series	Rachel Kondo and Justin Marks (for "Anjin")	Nominated	
Golden Globe Awards	January 5, 2025	Best Television Series – Drama	Shōgun	Won	
Golden Globe Awards	January 5, 2025	Best Actor in a Television Series – Drama	Hiroyuki Sanada	Won	
Golden Globe Awards	January 5, 2025	Best Actress in a Television Series – Drama	Anna Sawai	Won	
Golden Globe Awards	January 5, 2025	Best Supporting Actor – Series, Miniseries or Television Film	Tadanobu Asano	Won	
Critics' Choice Awards	January 12, 2025	Best Drama Series	Shōgun	Won	
Critics' Choice Awards	January 12, 2025	Best Actor in a Drama Series	Hiroyuki Sanada	Won	
Critics' Choice Awards	January 12, 2025	Best Actress in a Drama Series	Anna Sawai	Nominated	
Critics' Choice Awards	January 12, 2025	Best Supporting Actor in a Drama Series	Tadanobu Asano	Won	
Critics' Choice Awards	January 12, 2025	Best Supporting Actor in a Drama Series	Takehiro Hira	Nominated	
Critics' Choice Awards	January 12, 2025	Best Supporting Actress in a Drama Series	Moeka Hoshi	Won	
American Cinema Editors Awards	January 18, 2025	Best Edited Drama Series	Maria Gonzalez and Aika Miyake (for "A Dream of a Dream")	Won	
Satellite Awards	January 26, 2025	Best Drama Series	Shōgun	Nominated	
Satellite Awards	January 26, 2025	Best Actor in a Drama or Genre Series	Hiroyuki Sanada	Won	
Satellite Awards	January 26, 2025	Best Actress in a Drama or Genre Series	Anna Sawai	Nominated	
Satellite Awards	January 26, 2025	Best Actor in a Supporting Role in a Series, Miniseries & Limited Series, or Motion Picture Made for Television	Tadanobu Asano	Nominated	
Satellite Awards	January 26, 2025	Best Actress in a Supporting Role in a Series, Miniseries & Limited Series, or Motion Picture Made for Television	Moeka Hoshi	Nominated	
British Society of Cinematographers Awards	February 1, 2025	Best Cinematography in a Television Drama (International/Streaming)	Christopher Ross (for "Anjin")	Nominated	
British Society of Cinematographers Awards	February 1, 2025	Best Cinematography in a Television Drama (International/Streaming)	Sam McCurdy (for "Crimson Sky")	Nominated	
Grammy Awards	February 2, 2025	Best Score Soundtrack for Visual Media	Atticus Ross, Leopold Ross & Nick Chuba	Nominated	
Saturn Awards	February 2, 2025	Best Adventure Television Series	Shōgun	Nominated	
Costume Designers Guild Awards	February 6, 2025	Excellence in Period Television	Caros Rosario (for "Ladies of the Willow World")	Won	
Costume Designers Guild Awards	February 6, 2025	Excellence in Costume Illustration	James Holland (1 of 2)	Won	
Costume Designers Guild Awards	February 6, 2025	Excellence in Costume Illustration	James Holland (2 of 2)	Nominated	
Visual Effects Society Awards	February 11, 2025	Outstanding Visual Effects in a Photoreal Episode	Michael Cliett, Melody Mead, Philip Engström, Ed Bruce, and Cameron Waldbauer (for "Anjin")	Won	
Visual Effects Society Awards	February 11, 2025	Outstanding Created Environment in an Episode, Commercial, Game Cinematic or Real-Time Project	Manuel Martinez, Phil Hannigan, Keith Malone, and Francesco Corvino (for Osaka)	Won	
Visual Effects Society Awards	February 11, 2025	Outstanding Effects Simulations in an Episode, Commercial, Game Cinematic or Real-Time Project	Dominic Tiedeken, Heinrich Löwe, Charles Guerton, and Timmy Lundin (for "Broken to the Fist" – "Landslide")	Won	
Visual Effects Society Awards	February 11, 2025	Outstanding Compositing and Lighting in an Episode	Benjamin Bernon, Douglas Roshamn, Victor Kirsch, and Charlie Raud (for "Broken to the Fist" – "Landslide")	Nominated	
Artios Awards	February 12, 2025	Outstanding Achievement in Casting – Television Pilot and First Season Drama	Laura Schiff, Carrie Audino, Chelsea Egozi, and Kei Kawamura	Won	
Society of Composers & Lyricists	February 12, 2025	Outstanding Original Score for a Television Production	Atticus Ross, Leopold Ross, and Nick Chuba	Won	
Society of Composers & Lyricists	February 12, 2025	Outstanding Original Title Sequence for a Television Production	Atticus Ross, Leopold Ross, and Nick Chuba	Nominated	
Independent Spirit Awards	February 22, 2025	Best New Scripted Series	Rachel Kondo, Justin Marks, Edward L. McDonnell, Michael De Luca, Michaela Clavell, Shannon Goss, Andrew Macdonald, Allon Reich, and Jamie Vega Wheeler	Won	
Independent Spirit Awards	February 22, 2025	Best Lead Performance in a New Scripted Series	Hiroyuki Sanada	Nominated	
Independent Spirit Awards	February 22, 2025	Best Lead Performance in a New Scripted Series	Anna Sawai	Nominated	
Independent Spirit Awards	February 22, 2025	Best Supporting Performance in a New Scripted Series	Tadanobu Asano	Nominated	
Independent Spirit Awards	February 22, 2025	Best Supporting Performance in a New Scripted Series	Moeka Hoshi	Nominated	
Cinema Audio Society Awards	February 22, 2025	Outstanding Achievement in Sound Mixing for Television Series – One Hour	Michael Williamson, Steve Pederson, Greg P. Russell, Takashi Akaku, and Arno Stephanian (for "Broken to the Fist")	Won	
Golden Reel Awards	February 23, 2025	Outstanding Achievement in Sound Editing – Broadcast Long Form Dialogue and ADR	Brian J. Armstrong, Damon Cohoon, John Creed, and Ayako Yamauchi (for "Ladies of the Willow World")	Won	
Golden Reel Awards	February 23, 2025	Outstanding Achievement in Sound Editing – Broadcast Long Form Effects and Foley	Brian J. Armstrong, Benjamin L. Cook, James Gallivan, Mark Hailstone, Ken Cain, Sanaa Kelley, and Matt Salib (for "Broken to the Fist")	Nominated	
Screen Actors Guild Awards	February 23, 2025	Outstanding Performance by a Male Actor in a Drama Series	Tadanobu Asano	Nominated	
Screen Actors Guild Awards	February 23, 2025	Outstanding Performance by a Male Actor in a Drama Series	Hiroyuki Sanada	Won	
Screen Actors Guild Awards	February 23, 2025	Outstanding Performance by a Female Actor in a Drama Series	Anna Sawai	Won	
Screen Actors Guild Awards	February 23, 2025	Outstanding Performance by an Ensemble in a Drama Series	Shinnosuke Abe, Tadanobu Asano, Tommy Bastow, Takehiro Hira, Moeka Hoshi, Hiromoto Ida, Cosmo Jarvis, Hiroto Kanai, Yuki Kura, Takeshi Kurokawa, Fumi Nikaido, Tokuma Nishioka, Hiroyuki Sanada, and Anna Sawai	Won	
Screen Actors Guild Awards	February 23, 2025	Outstanding Performance by a Stunt Ensemble in a Television Series	Shōgun	Won	
British Academy Television Craft Awards	April 27, 2025	Best Photography and Lighting: Fiction	Christopher Ross	Won	
Peabody Awards	May 1, 2025	Entertainment	FX Productions	Won	
British Academy Television Awards	May 11, 2025	Best International Programme	Justin Marks, Rachel Kondo, Michaela Clavell, Jonathan van Tulleken, Eriko Miyagawa, and Hiroyuki Sanada	Won	
Critics' Choice Super Awards	August 7, 2025	Best Action Series, Limited Series or Made-for-TV Movie	Shōgun	Won	
Critics' Choice Super Awards	August 7, 2025	Best Actor in an Action Series, Limited Series or Made-for-TV Movie	Hiroyuki Sanada	Won	
Critics' Choice Super Awards	August 7, 2025	Best Actress in an Action Series, Limited Series or Made-for-TV Movie	Anna Sawai	Won	
Critics' Choice Super Awards	August 7, 2025	Best Villain in a Series, Limited Series or Made-for-TV Movie	Takehiro Hira	Nominated	
Writers Guild of America Awards	February 15, 2025	Television: Dramatic Series	Shannon Goss, Maegan Houang, Rachel Kondo, Matt Lambert, Justin Marks, Caillin Puente, Nigel Williams, and Emily Yoshida	Won	
Writers Guild of America Awards	February 15, 2025	Television: New Series	Shannon Goss, Maegan Houang, Rachel Kondo, Matt Lambert, Justin Marks, Caillin Puente, Nigel Williams, and Emily Yoshida	Won	
Writers Guild of America Awards	February 15, 2025	Television: Episodic Drama	Rachel Kondo & Justin Marks Episode: "Anjin"	Won	
