= Crimson Sky =

- Shōgun episode
- Episode no.: Season 1 Episode 9
- Directed by: Frederick E. O. Toye
- Written by: Rachel Kondo; Caillin Puente
- Cinematography by: Sam McCurdy
- Editing by: Thomas A. Krueger
- Original release date: April 16, 2024
- Running time: 60 minutes

Guest appearances
- Yoriko Dōguchi as Kiri no Kata; Eisuke Sasai as Lord Ito; Eita Okuno as Saeki Nobutatsu; Louis Ferreira as Ferreira; Paulino Nunes as Father Visitor Carlo Dell'Acqua; Hiromoto Ida as Kiyama Ukon Sadanaga; Takeshi Kurokawa as Ohno Harunobu

Episode chronology
← Previous "The Abyss of Life"	Next → "A Dream of a Dream"

"Crimson Sky" (Japanese: 紅天, Hepburn: Kōten) is the ninth episode of the American historical drama television series Shōgun, based on the novel by James Clavell. The episode was written by series co-creator Rachel Kondo and Caillin Puente, and directed by Frederick E. O. Toye. It was released on Hulu on April 16, 2024, and it also aired on FX on the same day.

The series is set in 1600, and follows three characters. John Blackthorne, a risk-taking English sailor who ends up shipwrecked in Japan, a land whose unfamiliar culture will ultimately redefine him; Lord Toranaga, a shrewd, powerful daimyo, at odds with his own dangerous, political rivals; and Lady Mariko, a woman with invaluable skills but dishonorable family ties, who must prove her value and allegiance. In the episode, Toranaga, Blackthorne and Mariko return to Osaka to meet with Ishido.

According to Nielsen Media Research, the episode was seen by an estimated 0.538 million household viewers and gained a 0.09 ratings share among adults aged 18–49. The episode was praised by critics for Anna Sawai's performance, tone, writing and ending.

The episode received several nominations at the 76th Primetime Emmy Awards including Outstanding Writing for a Drama Series for Kondo and Puente, and won for Outstanding Directing for a Drama Series for Toye and Outstanding Cinematography for Sam McCurdy. Sawai and Takehiro Hira submitted the episode for their Emmy nominations for Outstanding Lead Actress in a Drama Series and Outstanding Supporting Actor in a Drama Series respectively, with the former winning her category.

== Plot ==
In 1586, Mariko is lost in the snow. Father Alvito finds her and gives her a Catholic rosary necklace.

In 1600, Blackthorne, Yabushige, and Mariko sail in Yabushige's ship to Osaka, although Blackthorne is confused over why Mariko is accompanying him. Reuniting with Yabushige, they meet with Ishido to surrender. Yabushige offers Blackthorne's services to spare their lives, but Ishido is not interested.

Mariko demands to leave the city with Toranaga's family at his request, but during her attempt to leave, the guards kill her men. When Mariko tries to fight back with a naginata, the guards overpower her, so she announces that she will take her own life at sunset, with Kiyama agreeing to be her second to save her soul from damnation for suicide. This prompts Blackthorne to plead with her to "live for him," but she does not confirm anything. Ochiba meets with Blackthorne and Mariko in secret and recounts her and Mariko's childhood together in an attempt to make the latter surrender peacefully, but she refuses. Mariko soon prepares to commit seppuku, with Blackthorne agreeing to be her second after Kiyama does not arrive, but Ishido stops her and grants her permission to leave.

Later that night, Blackthorne and Mariko profess their love for each other. Ishido agrees to spare Yabushige, who in exchange kills several guards and allows an army of shinobi to infiltrate the castle. Blackthorne prevents them from kidnapping Mariko, fighting several off using his pistol, but finds himself outnumbered. Amid the chaos, Blackthorne, Mariko, Yabushige, and Toranaga's consorts lock themselves in a storehouse. After the shinobi set up explosives to blow open the door, Mariko willingly stands in front of it to defy Ishido, referring to herself by her birth surname, Akechi. Despite Blackthorne's pleas, Mariko accepts her fate, and the explosion subsequently kills her.

== Production ==
=== Development ===
In March 2024, Hulu confirmed that the ninth episode of the series would be titled "Crimson Sky", and was to be written by series co-creator Rachel Kondo and Caillin Puente, and directed by Frederick E. O. Toye. It was Kondo's third writing credit, Puente's first writing credit, and Toye's third directing credit.

=== Writing ===
When asked over the scene where Blackthorne stands up for Mariko, Sawai explained, "He's allowing her to die a loyal Catholic and a samurai. So I think it's the biggest gesture of love that she feels from him. It's a very romantic thing for her and she's in a way kind of seeing him in different eyes because of what this means."

Mariko's death is adapted from the novel, but the writers originally planned to end the episode with the shinobi infiltrating the castle, with Mariko's death moved for the next episode. Justin Marks then suggested moving the scene to the end of the ninth episode, explaining that her death would get the episode "to feel complete." The scene is very similar to Mariko's death in the novel, with a small difference; in the series, Mariko refers to herself as her birth surname of Akechi, while in the novel, she uses her married Toda name. Sawai explained, "She's not a Toda. She is an Akechi and she is also avenging her family at the same time. It was very intentional and it felt very powerful and I hope that people remember her as an Akechi rather than a Toda." Coincidentally, the scene was filmed on Sawai's birthday, June 11.

== Reception ==
=== Viewers ===
In its original FX broadcast, "Crimson Sky" was seen by an estimated 0.538 million household viewers and gained a 0.09 ratings share among adults aged 18–49, according to Nielsen Media Research. This means that 0.09 percent of all households with televisions watched the episode. This was a 23% increase in viewership from the previous episode, which was seen by an estimated 0.436 million household viewers and gained a 0.08 ratings share among adults aged 18–49.

=== Critical reviews ===
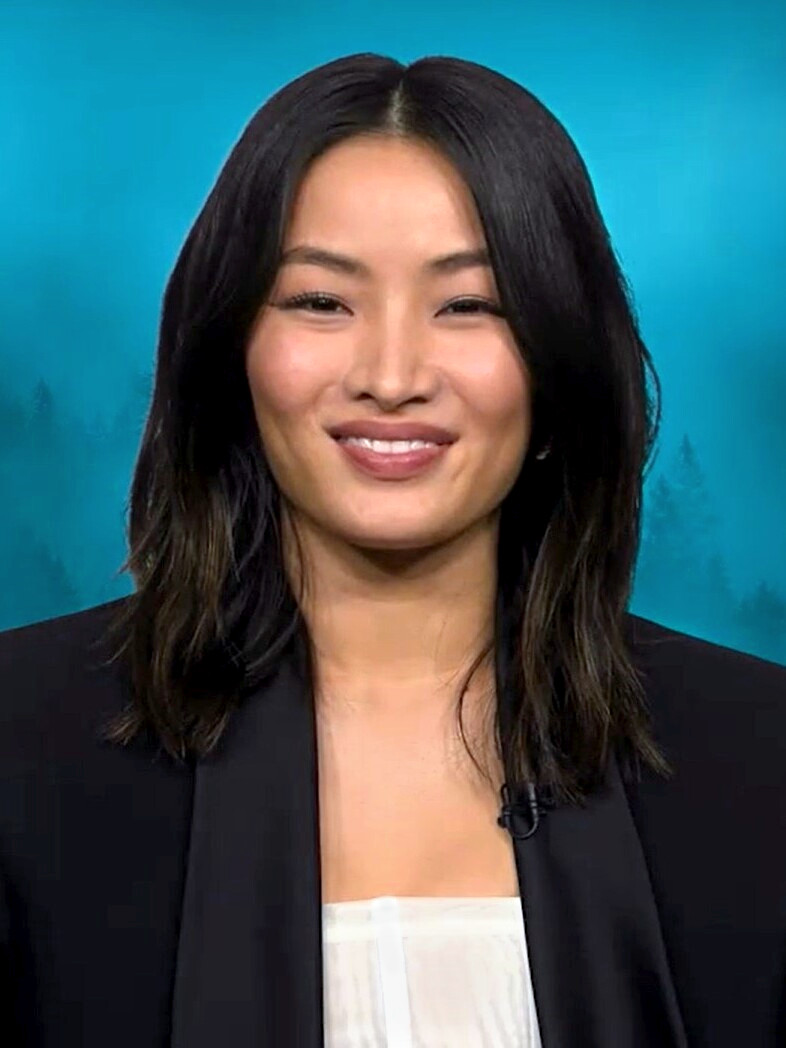
Anna Sawai won the Primetime Emmy Award for Outstanding Lead Actress in a Drama Series for her performance in the episode.

"Crimson Sky" was widely praised. The review aggregator website Rotten Tomatoes reported a 100% approval rating for the episode, based on five reviews, with an average rating of 9.8/10.

Meredith Hobbs Coons of The A.V. Club gave the episode an "A" and wrote, "She declares, 'I, Akechi Mariko, protest this shameful attack by Lord Ishido... and by my death—' she is cut off by the explosion, her body absorbs it, and the others are thus spared. Martín's melodic chanting plays over the credits. Our dear Mariko, heart of the series, is gone. But on her own terms. What will our Anjin do now?" Keith Phipps of Vulture gave the episode a perfect 5 star rating out of 5 and wrote, "Each episode of Shōgun has incorporated much of the ensemble — though Toranaga is notably absent here — but from beginning to end, this is Mariko's episode. It's also the best of the series so far."

Sean T. Collins of The New York Times wrote, "Put that way, 'Crimson Sky' is a bit of a bait and switch. But to deride it as such is to ignore all the episode delivered in exchange for putting off a climactic confrontation of samurais. It is a riveting look at a woman in extremis, channeling a lifetime of pain into one final incandescent act of strength and sacrifice." Josh Rosenberg of Esquire wrote, "Shōgun's body count continues to put my jaw on the floor. Nagakado's folly in Shōgun episode 7 was certainly one of those moments. Hiromatsu's death last week was another. So imagine my delight when episode 9 — which I'll outright say is the best TV episode of the year so far — left me stunned once again."

Johnny Loftus of Decider wrote, "even if this ultimate sacrifice, however it ultimately came about, really was what Toranaga asked of Mariko, that doesn't make it any less of a shock. There is only one episode of Shōgun left. Will the chosen death of his most loyal vassal be the karmic linchpin to Toranaga's ascension as sole ruler of a country on the brink?" Tyler Johnson of TV Fanatic gave the episode a 4.5 star rating out of 5 and wrote, "Rarely have we had any luck in predicting Toranaga's next move, but something tells us that he won't allow the death of his most loyal vassal to go unpunished. And with only one episode of Shogun remaining, it seems certain that the clash between the regents will soon come to a very violent conclusion."
