= Broken to the Fist =

- Shōgun episode
- Episode no.: Season 1 Episode 5
- Directed by: Frederick E. O. Toye
- Written by: Matt Lambert
- Cinematography by: Sam McCurdy
- Editing by: Aika Miyake
- Original release date: March 19, 2024
- Running time: 56 minutes

Guest appearances
- Hiroto Kanai as Kashigi Omi; Moeka Hoshi as Usami Fuji; Yasunari Takeshima as Tonomoto Akinao; Shinnosuke Abe as Toda "Buntaro" Hirokatsu; Yuki Kura as Yoshii Nagakado; Ako as Daiyoin / Lady Iyo; Hiromoto Ida as Kiyama ukon Sadanaga; Toshi Toda as Sugiyama Josui; Takeshi Kurokawa as Ohno Harunobu

Episode chronology
← Previous "The Eightfold Fence"	Next → "Ladies of the Willow World"

"Broken to the Fist" (Japanese: 父の怒り, Hepburn: Chichi no Ikari) is the fifth episode of the American historical drama television series Shōgun, based on the novel by James Clavell. The episode was written by consulting producer Matt Lambert, and directed by Frederick E. O. Toye. It was released on Hulu on March 19, 2024, and it also aired on FX on the same day.

The series is set in 1600, and follows three characters. John Blackthorne, a risk-taking English sailor who ends up shipwrecked in Japan, a land whose unfamiliar culture will ultimately redefine him; Lord Toranaga, a shrewd, powerful daimyo, at odds with his own dangerous, political rivals; and Lady Mariko, a woman with invaluable skills but dishonorable family ties, who must prove her value and allegiance. In the episode, Buntaro returns after the ambush, and Blackthorne gets into a fight over his treatment of Mariko.

According to Nielsen Media Research, the episode was seen by an estimated 0.554 million household viewers and gained a 0.10 ratings share among adults aged 18–49. The episode received critical acclaim, with Anna Sawai receiving significant praise for her performance.

== Plot ==
As Yabushige's army cleans up the aftermath of the chain shots, they are surprised by the arrival of Toranaga's army. One of the soldiers is Buntaro, who managed to survive the ambush. Toranaga is upset at Nagakado's actions, so he decides to give Omi his command of the cannon regiment.

With Buntaro's return, Mariko is still instructed to serve her duties to both her husband and Blackthorne. Buntaro moves in with them, and his presence soon causes friction within them. During this, Blackthorne puts a pheasant in front of the house, instructing Fuji not to remove it despite its smell, as Toranaga gave it to him as a gift. Due to his limited Japanese, he jokingly tells his servants that they'll die if they touch it. During dinner, Blackthorne and Buntaro engage in a sake drinking binge, although Blackthorne's attempts at friendliness eventually anger Buntaro into firing two arrows in front of Mariko’s face; despite Blackthorne's protests and Mariko's reluctance, he forces Mariko to tell Blackthorne about her father, Akechi Jinsai, who murdered the corrupt and murderous predecessor of the Taikō, Kuroda-sama. For this, Jinsai was forced to execute his entire family, including his wife and children, before committing seppuku; Mariko married Buntaro as atonement for his betrayal. Mariko then leaves without Buntaro's permission, enraging him further.

After hearing Buntaro beat Mariko in a fit of rage, Blackthorne confronts Buntaro outside the house with his gun, seemingly looking for a fight. Instead of fighting back, Buntaro apologizes for ruining the harmony of his household, blaming the sake for his anger; confused, Blackthorne leaves. The following day, Blackthorne tries to convince Mariko to leave her husband, but she refuses, also deciding that she will not speak with him unless Toranaga orders a translation; she also reveals that his swords, which Fuji believes were owned by her late father, were actually bought by her grandfather off a drunk samurai to placate her feelings, and she has Blackthorne swear to remain silent about it. At his house, Blackthorne's friendly gardener Uejiro is confused by Blackthorne's orders and removes the pheasant to dispose of it; he is later reported to have been executed, which devastates Blackthorne. However, Muraji manages to convince Yabushige and Omi that Uejiro was the spy they were searching for.

After Uejiro's death, Blackthorne meets with Toranaga, asking to leave Japan. During their meeting, an earthquake hits the village and causes a landslide. Toranaga is buried, but Blackthorne manages to save him, although Toranaga loses his swords in the process and his army suffers heavy losses; to compensate for his lost swords, Blackthorne offers him his own. In Osaka, the remaining regents attempt to decide who will take Toranaga's place on the council, but are unable to agree on a replacement. However. Ochiba no Kata, the consort of the late Taiko, soon arrives and reunites with her son Yaechiyo before frightening Ishido into submission by stating that the Regents will now listen to her.

== Production ==
=== Development ===
In February 2024, Hulu confirmed that the fifth episode of the series would be titled "Broken to the Fist", and was to be written by consulting producer Matt Lambert, and directed by Frederick E. O. Toye. It was Lambert's first writing credit, and Toye's second directing credit.

=== Writing ===
Justin Marks explained that the series wanted to explore more of Mariko, especially "what baggage is Mariko carrying with her." For this, it was important to show more about her father, as well as her marriage to Buntaro. Marks considered that Buntaro "keeps her in an invisible cage", but to protect her life as he fears losing her.

=== Filming ===
For the earthquake scene, producer Eriko Miyagawa said that the crew managed to depict the sequence through "really rigorous planning" and a combination of visual effects and stunts. She said, "It has to be an earthquake. Not, you know, another natural disaster. It has to look and feel like [an] earthquake."

== Reception ==
=== Viewers ===
In its original FX broadcast, "Broken to the Fist" was seen by an estimated 0.554 million household viewers and gained a 0.10 ratings share among adults aged 18–49, according to Nielsen Media Research. This means that 0.10 percent of all households with televisions watched the episode. This was a slight increase in viewership from the previous episode, which was seen by an estimated 0.517 million household viewers and gained a 0.10 ratings share among adults aged 18–49.

=== Critical reviews ===
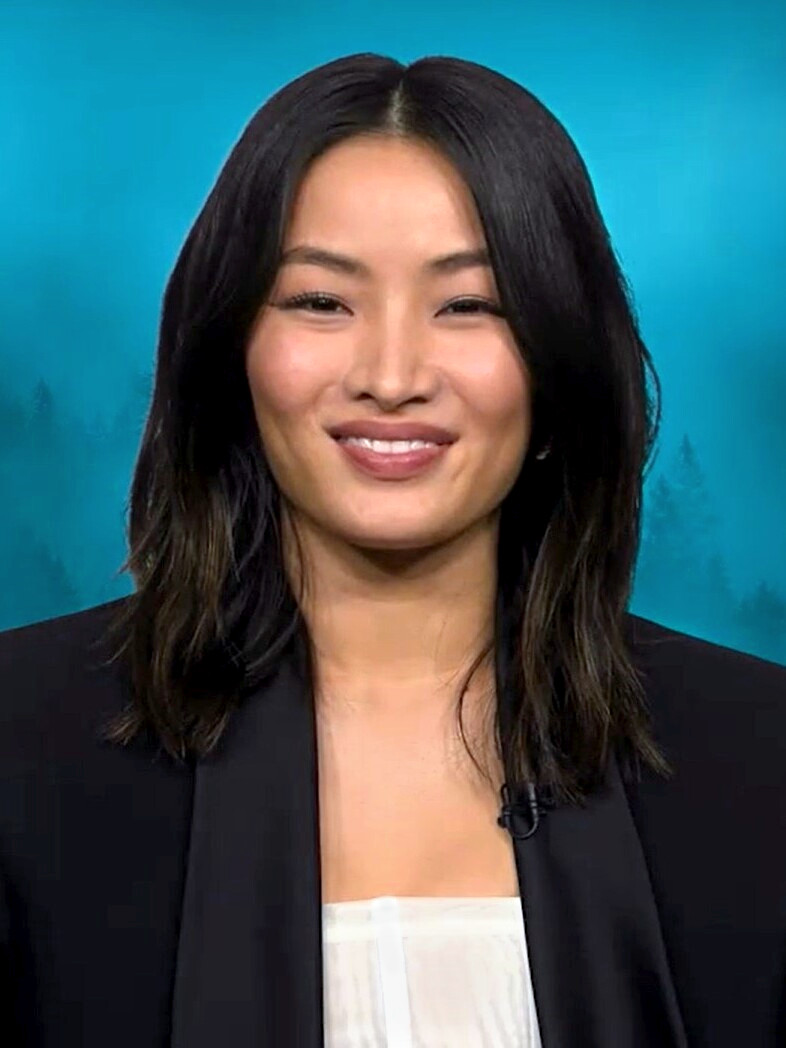
Anna Sawai received critical acclaim for her performance in the episode.

"Broken to the Fist" received critical acclaim. The review aggregator website Rotten Tomatoes reported a 75% approval rating for the episode, based on 4 reviews.

Meredith Hobbs Coons of The A.V. Club gave the episode an "A" and wrote, "In my various professional and personal intersections, one maxim rings true enough for me to wear it emblazoned across many of my shirts: "Your Words Matter." Obviously an episode of Shōgun that is all about that is going to check all of the right boxes for me. This one doesn't disappoint." Jesse Raub of Vulture gave the episode a perfect 5 star rating out of 5 and wrote, "In previous episodes, Shōgun's culture clash has mostly amounted to a lighthearted prodding of one man's customs butting up against those of the world around him. "Broken to the Fist," however, wants Blackthorne to understand that societal norms are truly a matter of life and death during Japan's Sengoku period."

Sean T. Collins of The New York Times wrote, "Once again, by finding himself in a jam, Blackthorne is also perfectly positioned to prove his worth to the man on whom his life depends. He is the luckiest unlucky man on television." Josh Rosenberg of Esquire wrote, "Uh-oh! If you've enjoyed watching Shōgun's forbidden relationship between Mariko and John Blackthorne, then the beginning of episode 5 surely struck fear in your heart."

Johnny Loftus of Decider wrote, "If there was silver lining to Nagakado's rash cannon attack, it was that the action would draw out Ishido's forces, away from the heavily fortified Osaka Castle and toward an entrenched Toranaga army, who would then be able to diminish their numbers. Now the Lord of the Kantō is at a greater disadvantage, one on which Lady Ochiba is sure to seize." Tyler Johnson of TV Fanatic gave the episode a 4.7 star rating out of 5 and wrote, "If this was an episode whose main purpose was "place-setting" for the conflicts to come, then it's all the more impressive for its ability to set that stage while also delving deep into the subtextual themes that do so much to elevate this show so far above its peers."

=== Accolades ===
TVLine named Anna Sawai the "Performer of the Week" for the week of March 23, 2024, for her performance in the episode. The site wrote, "Here, Sawai broke your heart by showing us Mariko's resignation to being demeaned. When an aghast Blackthorne called out that antic, Buntaro commanded his wife to detail for the barbarian the 'disgusting, filthy line' she hails from. Sawai had us rapt as Mariko, her voice laden with emotion, recounted the vast losses her family endured — as well as her inability to ever attempt any vengeance, all because 'my husband orders me to live.'"
