= A Stick of Time =

- Shōgun episode
- Episode no.: Season 1 Episode 7
- Directed by: Takeshi Fukunaga
- Written by: Matt Lambert
- Cinematography by: Sam McCurdy
- Editing by: Maria Gonzales
- Original release date: April 2, 2024
- Running time: 55 minutes

Guest appearances
- Tokuma Nishioka as Toda "Iron Fist" Hiromatsu; Yuki Kura as Yoshii Nagakado; Yuko Miyamoto as Gin; Moeka Hoshi as Usami Fuji; Yasunari Takeshima as Tonomoto Akinao; Shinnosuke Abe as Toda "Buntaro" Hirokatsu; Hiroto Kanai as Kashigi Omi; Yuka Kouri as Kiku; Eita Okuno as Saeki Nobutatsu; Takaaki Hirakawa as Mizoguchi

Episode chronology
← Previous "Ladies of the Willow World"	Next → "The Abyss of Life"

"A Stick of Time" (Japanese: 線香一本の時, Hepburn: Senkō Ippon no Toki) is the seventh episode of the American historical drama television series Shōgun, based on the novel by James Clavell. The episode was written by consulting producer Matt Lambert, and directed by Takeshi Fukunaga. It was released on Hulu on April 2, 2024, and it also aired on FX on the same day.

The series is set in 1600, and follows three characters. John Blackthorne, a risk-taking English sailor who ends up shipwrecked in Japan, a land whose unfamiliar culture will ultimately redefine him; Lord Toranaga, a shrewd, powerful daimyo, at odds with his own dangerous, political rivals; and Lady Mariko, a woman with invaluable skills but dishonorable family ties, who must prove her value and allegiance. In the episode, Toranaga meets his estranged half-brother to discuss terms of merging their two armies to invade Osaka as part of Crimson Sky.

According to Nielsen Media Research, the episode was seen by an estimated 0.540 million household viewers and gained a 0.09 ratings share among adults aged 18–49. The episode received critical acclaim, who praised the performances and production values.

== Plot ==
In 1554, a young Toranaga leads his first battle, which ends in victory against the warlord Mizoguchi. Mizoguchi surrenders, admiring Toranaga's determination and mastery of battle. Toranaga honors Mizoguchi's wishes, and the latter commits seppuku by stabbing himself in the stomach before Toranaga beheads him.

In 1600, Toranaga meets with his estranged half-brother, Saeki Nobutatsu. Toranaga wants to unite their armies to invade Osaka as part of Crimson Sky, and Saeki agrees to help his brother. Despite that, Toranaga has no plans for Blackthorne's role in the invasion, refusing to let him command his ship. During dinner, Saeki reveals he has been offered the fifth regency in place of Sugiyama, and Toranaga must either surrender to the council in Osaka or face imminent war. After blocking off all routes to Ajiro, Saeki also informs Yabushige that his general has been executed, ending his chance of successfully playing both sides.

After threatening Blackthorne, Buntaro asks Toranaga permission to kill him. He refuses, claiming he would have to kill Mariko as well, and he knows Buntaro cannot bring himself to do it. Mariko herself asks to commit seppuku, but Toranaga also refuses to let her do it. When Saeki returns, Toranaga proclaims that there will be no Crimson Sky. Against the wishes of Nagakado and Yabushige, Toranaga states he will go to Osaka and surrender. Meanwhile, at the Ajiro teahouse, Kiku leaves after sleeping with Saeki, giving Nagakado - without Toranaga's knowledge - the window to try assassinating his uncle. As his men are killed, Saeki falls into the teahouse's pond while trying to escape his nephew; however, as Nagakado tries to kill his uncle, he accidentally slips on Saeki's robe and fatally crushes his head on a rock.

== Production ==
=== Development ===
In March 2024, Hulu confirmed that the seventh episode of the series would be titled "A Stick of Time", and was to be written by consulting producer Matt Lambert, and directed by Takeshi Fukunaga. It was Lambert's second writing credit, and Fukunaga's first directing credit.

=== Writing ===
Commenting on Toranaga's relationship with Nagakado, Hiroyuki Sanada explained, "Toranaga sees the possibility in his son, but not enough yet." He said that Toranaga's actions are trying to make Nagakado understand how to build a new world, albeit not one that Toranaga will live to see.

== Reception ==
=== Viewers ===
In its original FX broadcast, "A Stick of Time" was seen by an estimated 0.540 million household viewers and gained a 0.09 ratings share among adults aged 18–49, according to Nielsen Media Research. This means that 0.09 percent of all households with televisions watched the episode. This was a slight increase in viewership from the previous episode, which was seen by an estimated 0.523 million household viewers and gained a 0.10 ratings share among adults aged 18–49.

=== Critical reviews ===
"A Stick of Time" received critical acclaim. The review aggregator website Rotten Tomatoes reported a 100% approval rating for the episode, based on 4 reviews.

Meredith Hobbs Coons of The A.V. Club gave the episode an "A" and wrote, "Naming this episode after this time-keeping device is an apt choice, as we find our heroes (and villains) in a bit of a waiting period for most of it. That said, it isn't boring; it's loaded and tense. The vibe is atmospheric and hazy, like scented smoke. We also find ourselves grappling with the fact that this is the seventh of ten episodes, which means the time we have with these characters and breathtaking landscapes will soon run out." Jesse Raub of Vulture gave the episode a 4 star rating out of 5 and wrote, "And so we say farewell to a would-be warlord who never got the chance to experience the thrill of battle. It's tempting to call Nagakado a failson, but Shōgun honestly hasn't provided enough evidence to make that call."

Sean T. Collins of The New York Times wrote, "Gin uses her time to ask for the construction of a special red-light district in Toranaga's burgeoning city, Edo. When he protests that he has no future to offer her, she doesn't buy it. Surely the great Toranaga has one last legend in him." Josh Rosenberg of Esquire wrote, "So will Nagakado's impetuous attack stir up even more animosity between the two brothers in the next episode? I'll tell you one thing for sure: I definitely didn't see that coming."

Johnny Loftus of Decider wrote, "Fate as it relates to life, as either guide or cruel master, is at the center of Shōgun's seventh episode. Of course fate weighs heavily on everybody in feudal Japan, in each decision made. But with the protective barriers Lord Yoshii Toranaga has constructed around himself, his vassals, and his forces crumbling – or being consumed by a massive earthquake, in the case of the latter – fate is top of mind for everyone." Tyler Johnson of TV Fanatic gave the episode a 4.5 star rating out of 5 and wrote, "This hour of Shogun depicts a hinged moment between monumental events - a period in which time briefly slows down and offers a moment for contemplation before everything changes forever. While we know there's much more story left to tell, "A Stick of Time" left us with the sense that all is lost - a set of dire circumstances that will hopefully make our protagonists' forthcoming heroics all the more awe-inspiring."
