= Seishirō Nishida =

Japanese actor

- 西田 聖志郎
- Born: May 3, 1955 (age 70); Kagoshima, Kagoshima Prefecture, Japan
- Education: Kamoike Junior High School; Kōnan High School; Nihon University College of Art
- Occupation: Actor
- Years active: 1981–

Seishirō Nishida (西田 聖志郎, Nishida Seishirō; born May 3, 1955, in Kagoshima, Kagoshima Prefecture, Japan) is a Japanese actor.

== Biography ==
Nishida was born in Kagoshima, Kagoshima Prefecture. He has a family relationship Bakumatsu scholar and poet Hatta Tomonori. Nishida graduated from Kagoshima Municipal Kamoike Junior High School, from Kagoshima Prefectural Konan High School, and from Nihon University College of Art.

After graduating from university he started performing in the theater. Nishida's acting experience was from the film, Mr. Mrs. Miss Lonely. He debuted in the television drama, Kaikyō.

While acting, Nishida once debuted as a singer in 1984 with the single, "Amadare". Since he is born in Kagoshima, he gives a Kagoshima dialect in television dramas.

Nishida also became a producer and created an office called Paddy House.

== Filmography ==
=== TV series ===
Year	Title	Role	Notes	Ref.
1988	Tabaruzaka			
1990	Tobu ga Gotoku	Shinohara Kunimoto		
1991	Minamoto no Yoshitsune			
2000	Aoi Tokugawa Sandai	Itakura Shigemune		
2000	Atsuhime	Itakura Katsukiyo		
2010	Ryōmaden	Ōyama Hikohachi		
2011	Chōchō-san: Saigo no Bushi no Musume	Head clerk		
2012	One no Kanata ni: Chichi to Musuko no Nikkō-ki Tsuiraku Jiko	Barber		

=== Films ===
Year	Title	Role	Notes	Ref.
1990	Tokyo Heaven			
2013	Rokuga Tsudō no Sanshimai	Shinpei Arima		
2024	Bibalam			

=== Stage ===
Year	Title	Notes
2008	Tengoku ni itte 3ttsu-me no Door	Lead role
2009	Rokuga Tsudō no Sanshimai	

=== Radio ===
Year	Title	Network	Notes
1995	Radio Toshokan	TBS Radio	

=== Dialect ===
Year	Title	Network	Notes
2000	Atsuhime	NHK	
2004	Shinsengumi!	NHK	
2009	Saka no Ue no Kumo	NHK	

== Discography ==
Year	Title	Notes
1984	"Amadare"	
