= Taro Ishida (composer) =

Japanese composer

- Born: Boston, Massachusetts, U.S.
- Education: Tokyo University of the Arts (master's in music)
- Occupations: Musician, composer, music producer

Taro Ishida (born November 8, 1979) is a Japanese composer and music producer who specializes in gagaku, a type of classical Japanese music. He contributed arrangements of Japanese traditional music for the FX series Shōgun (2024), which was nominated for multiple Emmy Awards, including Outstanding Music Composition and Main Title Theme Music.

== Early life and education ==
Taro Ishida was born in Boston, Massachusetts, and later moved to Japan. He studied Chinese literature at Sophia University before enrolling at the Tokyo University of the Arts, where he studied composition, electronic music, and related fields, including gagaku, a form of traditional Japanese court music. He completed a master's degree and began working as a professional composer during his studies.

== Career ==
In 2016, Ishida was appointed music director for the projection mapping event "Haruka" in Fukushima, following in the footsteps of renowned artists Ryuichi Sakamoto and Otomo Yoshihide. In 2018, he founded Drifter Inc., with the aim of musical innovation within the realm of Gagaku.

That same year, Ishida composed the music for the 3D dome-theater film 9-Dimensional Man, directed by Takashi Shimizu and produced by the National Museum of Emerging Science and Innovation (Miraikan).

In 2018, Ishida's composition Asobi for gaku-biwa was performed by Kahoru Nakamura at the Tokyo Metropolitan Teien Art Museum during its Music Garden event, associated with an exhibition on indigenous Brazilian chairs.

He has created music for institutions:Tokyo Metropolitan Teien Art Museum, the Pompidou Centre, and the Mori Art Museum, including corporate clients: NHK, UNIQLO, and HONDA.

In 2021, Ishida launched the Gagaku project "Donburako" with artists Oorutaichi and members of the Reigakusha Ensemble, focusing on reimagining ancient Japanese music for contemporary audiences.

That same year, Ishida provided the music for Night Flower, a planetarium film produced by Konica Minolta, collaborating with musician Manami Kakudo on its theme and insert songs.

Ishida served as music producer for the 2022 renewal of Michinoku Matsuriya, a live performance staged at Hoshino Resorts Aomoriya in Aomori Prefecture.

The 2025 album Tokoyo features gagaku instruments—including hichiriki, shō, ryūteki and gaku-biwa—alongside violin, viola, cello and piano.

That same year, Ishida took part in a series of talks and lectures about gagaku for the Japanese media company Hobonichi, discussing its instruments and approaches to listening.

That same year, Ishida composed music for the opening of NHK Utsunomiya's news programme Tochigi 630, with the opening animation created by artist Shishiyamazaki.

That same year, Ishida composed new music for the bird-performance show BROAD at Nasu Animal Kingdom.

In February 2026, Kyoto City KYOCERA Museum of Art listed Ishida and the Tokoyo ensemble in a talk and concert held in connection with its exhibition Japanese Painting Avant-Garde: Kyoto 1948–1970.

In March 2026, a Tokoyo concert and a separate lecture-performance devoted to gagaku were scheduled at the Maison de la culture du Japon à Paris.

That same year, Ishida performed alongside ROTH BART BARON at the KAIMoN Music Festival held at MoN Takanawa, combining the band's repertoire with Japanese traditional instruments.

== Recent work ==
In 2024, Ishida served as the overall music arranger for the FX historical drama series Shōgun, produced by and starring Hiroyuki Sanada. He arranged the in-series cues and coordinated recordings of Japanese traditional music in Japan, working with the Los Angeles–based composing team including Atticus Ross, Leopold Ross, and Nick Chuba.

The series' score and main title theme were nominated at the 76th Primetime Emmy Awards for Outstanding Music Composition for a Series (Original Dramatic Score) and Outstanding Original Main Title Theme Music.

The Shōgun score was also nominated for Best Score Soundtrack for Visual Media (Includes Film and Television) at the 67th Annual Grammy Awards.

In 2025, Ishida released the album ''Tokoyo'', a project based on gagaku and combined with elements of contemporary music, classical strings, and electronic sound.

In March 2026, he gave lectures and performances on gagaku in Europe, including events at Kultur im Trafo in Munich, the Japan Cultural Institute in Cologne, the Leipzig Book Fair, and the Maison de la culture du Japon à Paris.

In 2026, Ishida was appointed as a visiting professor at Kyoto University of the Arts.

== Discography ==
=== Albums ===
- ''Grandfinale'' (2009)
- ''Night Flower'' (2021)
- ''Shōgun: Original Soundtrack'' (2024) – arrangements of Japanese traditional music.
- ''Shōgun: Original Soundtrack Vol. 2'' (2024) – arrangements of Japanese traditional music.
- ''Tokoyo'' (2025)

=== EPs ===
- ''Asobi''(2019)

=== Singles ===
- "Toyohara Station Song" (2018)
- "Drifters" (2021)
- "Because You Were There" (feat. Manami Kakudo) (2024)
- Shi (2026), solo piano release.

=== Notable collaborations ===
- Contributed to Oorutaichi's special band project "Hotokeno" (2020), where he arranged the song "Beloved Ones."

=== Selected projects ===
- "Is Anyone There?" at the Pompidou Centre (2011)
- "Japan's Most Beautiful Island - Ōmi Island" (2014)
- Soundtrack for "SHOGUN" (2024, Arranger)
- European gagaku lectures and performances in Munich, Cologne, Leipzig and Paris (2026)
