= Rachel Kondo =

Japanese-American writer and television supervising producer

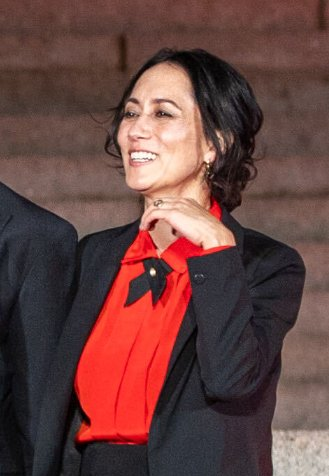
Rachel Kondo in February 2024, Tokyo

Rachel Kondo is an American writer and television supervising producer. Her short story "Girl of Few Seasons" was a finalist for the O. Henry Award. Alongside her husband Justin Marks, she is also an executive producer for the 2024 adaptation of Shōgun.

== Early life and career ==
Kondo is of Japanese descent. She grew up in Pukalani, Hawaii. Kondo pursued her Master of Fine Arts at the Michener Center for Writers at the University of Texas at Austin. During her time there, she was a finalist for the 2014 Keene Prize for Literature and received part of the $50,000 runner-up prize.

Alongside her husband Justin Marks, she is a writer and executive producer for the 2024 re-adaptation of Shōgun. That same year, Kondo was recognized by Gold House as one of the year's Most Impactful Asians, alongside the show's stars Hiroyuki Sanada and Anna Sawai.

== Awards and nominations ==
Year	Award	Category	Nominated work	Result	Ref.
2024	Primetime Emmy Awards	Outstanding Drama Series	Shōgun	Won	
2024	Primetime Emmy Awards	Outstanding Writing for a Drama Series	Shōgun Episode: "Crimson Sky" w/ Caillin Puente	Nominated	
2024	Primetime Emmy Awards	Outstanding Writing for a Drama Series	Shōgun Episode: "Anjin" w/ Justin Marks	Nominated	
2025	Peabody Awards	Entertainment	Shōgun	Won	
2025	British Academy Television Awards	Best International Programme	Shōgun	Won	
2025	Writers Guild of America Awards	Television: Dramatic Series	the writing staff of Shōgun	Won	
2025	Writers Guild of America Awards	Television: New Series	the writing staff of Shōgun	Won	
2025	Writers Guild of America Awards	Television: Episodic Drama	Episode: "Anjin" w/ Justin Marks	Won	
