= Maegan Houang =

American writer and director

- Born: East Lansing, Michigan, U.S.
- Occupations: Writer, director, producer
- Years active: 2010–present

Maegan Houang is an American writer and director known for her work in television, films, and music videos. In 2023, she was named one of Filmmaker Magazine's "25 New Faces of Independent Film".

== Early life and education ==
Houang was born and raised in East Lansing, Michigan. She attended Wesleyan University, graduating in 2010 with dual degrees in Mathematical Economics and Film Studies. She later earned a Master’s degree in Film Studies at Wesleyan.

== Career ==
Houang has directed short films, including In Full Bloom (2019), funded by a VSCO Voices Creator Grant and starring Kieu Chinh, screened at Fantastic Fest and other festivals. In 2023 her short film, Astonishing Little Feet, starring Celia Au and Perry Yung, examines Afong Moy’s exploitation and premiered on Nowness Asia, later shown at MoMA and other venues.

Houang started as a writer’s assistant before working as a staff writer on Starz’s Counterpart (2018–2019), story editor and producer on the FX’s series Shōgun (2024), writer and co-producer on the HBO’s The Sympathizer (2024), and director of two episodes of Three Busy Debras (2022). Additionally, she co-wrote the feature film Jamojaya (2023), directed by Justin Chon, and is currently writing Nekrokosm, a sci-fi fantasy film for A24, directed by Panos Cosmatos.

Houang has directed music videos for artists, including Mitski, Vagabon, Charly Bliss, Chastity Belt, and Hana Vu.

== Select filmography ==
Year	Title	Contribution	Note
2024	The Sympathizer	Writer and co-producer	TV series
2024	Shōgun	Writer	TV series
2023	Jamojaya	Co-wrote	Feature film
2023	Astonishing Little Feet	Director, writer and producer	Short film
2019	In Full Bloom	Director and writer	Short film

=== Selected music videos ===
Year	Title	Artist/Band	Roles	Notes
2024	"Star"	Mitski	Director	
2024	"Care"	Hana Vu	Director and writer	
2021	"The Only Heartbreaker"	Mitski	Director and writer	co-directed : Jeff Desom
2019	"Chatroom"	Charly Bliss	Director and writer	
2019	"Water Me Down"	Vagabon	Director and writer	

== Awards and nominations ==
Year	Result	Award	Category	Work	Ref.
2025	Nominated	South by Southwest	Music Video	Hana Vu – "Care"	
2025	Won	Writers Guild of America Awards	Television: Dramatic Series	Shōgun	
2025	Won	Writers Guild of America Awards	Television: New Series	Shōgun	
2024	Nominated	Humanitas Prize	Short Film	Astonishing Little Feet	
2022	Nominated	Raindance Film Festival	Best Music Video	Mitski – "Stay Soft"	
2022	Nominated	South by Southwest	Music Video	Hana Vu – "Keeper"	
2020	Nominated	South by Southwest	Music Video	Vagabon – "Water Me Down"	
2020	Won	UK Music Video Awards	Best Pop Video - Newcomer	Vagabon - "In a Bind"	
2016	Nominated	UK Music Video Awards	Best Pop Video - Newcomer	Skylar Spence - "I Can't Be Your Superman"	
