= Yoriko Dōguchi =

Japanese actress (born 1965)

Yoriko Dōguchi 洞口 依子
- Born: 18 March 1965 (age 61); Tokyo, Japan
- Occupation: Actress
- Years active: 1985–present

Yoriko Dōguchi (洞口 依子, Dōguchi Yoriko; born 18 March 1965 in Tokyo) is a Japanese actress.

== Selected filmography ==
=== Film ===
- The Excitement of the Do-Re-Mi-Fa Girl (1985)
- Tampopo (1985)
- Cure (1997)
- Charisma (1999)
- Tomie (1999) as Dr. Hosono
- 20th Century Boys 2: the last hop (2009)
- Yuriko, Dasvidaniya (2011)
- Between the White Key and the Black Key (2023)
- Kaneko Fumiko: Because I Wanted to (2026)

=== Television ===
- Shōgun (2024–present)
