= Justin Marks (writer) =

American screenwriter (born 1980)

- Born: 1980 (age 45–46); United States
- Education: Columbia University
- Occupations: Screenwriter, producer, television showrunner
- Years active: 2002–present

Justin Marks (born 1980) is an American screenwriter, producer, and television showrunner. He wrote the screenplay for the 2016 live-action Jungle Book, and was nominated for Best Adapted Screenplay at the 95th Academy Awards as one of the writers of Top Gun: Maverick (2022). Alongside his wife Rachel Kondo, Marks created and served as showrunner of the FX epic series Shōgun, based on the novel by James Clavell. The 2024 series won a Peabody Award at the 85th Annual Ceremony. It also won 18 Emmys in its first season, which is more wins than any other single television season in history.

== Education ==
Marks graduated from Columbia College of Columbia University in 2002, where he studied architecture. During his senior year, he befriended a literary manager, who helped him launch his career in screenwriting.

== Career ==
One of the first scripts Marks penned was Street Fighter: The Legend of Chun Li for 20th Century Fox. A year prior, he had also written a script for a potential He-Man film, initially entitled Grayskull: The Masters of The Universe. Marks is no longer involved with this project as of 2024, when it was announced that the film will have a script written by Chris Butler.

After a pilot produced for SyFy failed to sell, Marks wrote of his experiences for the Hollywood Reporter.

In July 2013, Marks was hired by Disney to write a live-action adaptation of The Jungle Book. Jon Favreau came on board as director, and the film was released in April 2016, grossing $966 million worldwide. In 2016, Marks was working on a Jungle Book sequel with Favreau returning as director.

In June 2015, it was announced that Marks was working on the screenplay for a sequel to the 1986 film Top Gun. The film, titled Top Gun: Maverick, was released in May 2022; Marks was credited as story co-writer with Peter Craig. For his work, he was nominated for Best Adapted Screenplay at the 95th Academy Awards.

Marks created the Starz science-fiction thriller Counterpart, starring J. K. Simmons. The show was ordered straight-to-series for two ten-episode seasons. The first episode premiered December 10, 2017, but the series failed to attract an audience. Marks stated on his Twitter feed that MRC would attempt to find the series a new home. Starz cited a lack of female appeal as a factor in the show's cancellation.

In 2020, Marks and his wife Rachel Kondo commenced work on a new television TV adaptation of the James Clavell novel Shogun.

He is also currently writing Prince of Port Au Prince, a Netflix CG-animated feature film inspired by the childhood of Haitian singer and The Fugees cofounder Wyclef Jean.

== Filmography ==
Film writer

- Street Fighter: The Legend of Chun-Li (2009)
- The Jungle Book (2016)
- Top Gun: Maverick (2022) (Story only)

Television

Year	Title	Writer	Executive Producer	Showrunner	Creator	Notes
2013	Rewind	Yes	Yes	No	No	TV movie
2017–2019	Counterpart	Yes	Yes	Yes	Yes	
2024	Shōgun	Yes	Yes	Yes	Yes	with Rachel Kondo

== Awards ==
=== Features ===
Year	Title	Academy Awards	Satellite Awards	USC Scripter Awards	WGA Awards	Result
2023	Top Gun: Maverick	1	1	1	1	Nominee
2017	The Jungle Book		1			Nominee

=== Television ===
Awards and nominations received by Shōgun
Year	Award	Award Title	Episode	Result
2025	Golden Globes	Best Television Series - Drama		Winner
2025	WGA Award	Episodic Drama		Winner
2025	WGA Award	Drama Series		Winner
2025	WGA Award	New Series		Winner
2025	Gold Derby TV Award	Drama Episode	Anjin	Nominee
2025	BAFTA	Best International Series		Winner
2025	Film Independent Spirit Award	Best New Scripted Series		Winner
2025	PGA Award	Outstanding Producer of Episodic Television, Drama		Winner
2025	USC Scripter Award	Best Television Series		Nominee
2024	Primetime Emmy Award	Outstanding Drama Series		Winner
2024	Primetime Emmy Award	Outstanding Writing for a Drama Series		Nominee
2024	Gotham TV Award	Breakthrough Limited Series		Nominee
2024	Emmy Award	Outstanding Writing For A Drama Series	Anjin	Nominee
2024	Emmy Award	Outstanding Drama Series		Winner
2024	Peabody Award			Winner
2024	TCA Awards	Outstanding New Program		Winner
2024	TCA Awards	Outstanding Achievement in Drama		Winner
2024	TCA Awards	Program of the Year		Winner
