= 76th Primetime Creative Arts Emmy Awards =

2024 American television programming awards for creative arts

- Date: September 7–8, 2024
- Location: Peacock Theater; Los Angeles, California
- Presented by: Academy of Television Arts & Sciences
- Most awards: Shōgun (14)
- Most nominations: Shōgun (17)

Television/radio coverage
- Network: FXX
- Produced by: Bob Bain
- Directed by: Richard Preuss

The 76th Primetime Creative Arts Emmy Awards honored the best in artistic and technical achievement in American prime time television programming from June 1, 2023, until May 31, 2024, as chosen by the Academy of Television Arts & Sciences. The awards were presented on September 7 and 8, 2024, at the Peacock Theater in Downtown Los Angeles, California. A total of 106 Creative Arts Emmys were presented across 99 categories. The ceremonies were broadcast in the United States by FXX on September 14.

Shōgun won fourteen awards, leading all programs; The Bear followed with seven awards. Shōgun also received the most nominations with 17 nominations followed by Only Murders in the Building and Saturday Night Live with 15 nominations each. Overall program awards went to Beckham, Blue Eye Samurai, Dick Van Dyke 98 Years of Magic, Fallout: Vault 33, Going to Mars: The Nikki Giovanni Project, Jeopardy!, Jim Henson Idea Man, My Next Guest with David Letterman and John Mulaney, Only Murders in the Building: One Killer Question, The Oscars, Quiz Lady, Shark Tank, Shōgun – The Making of Shōgun, Silent Hill: Ascension, Welcome to Wrexham, and What If...? – An Immersive Story. Among networks and platforms FX earned the most awards with 27 wins; Netflix received the most nominations with 83.

== Winners and nominees ==
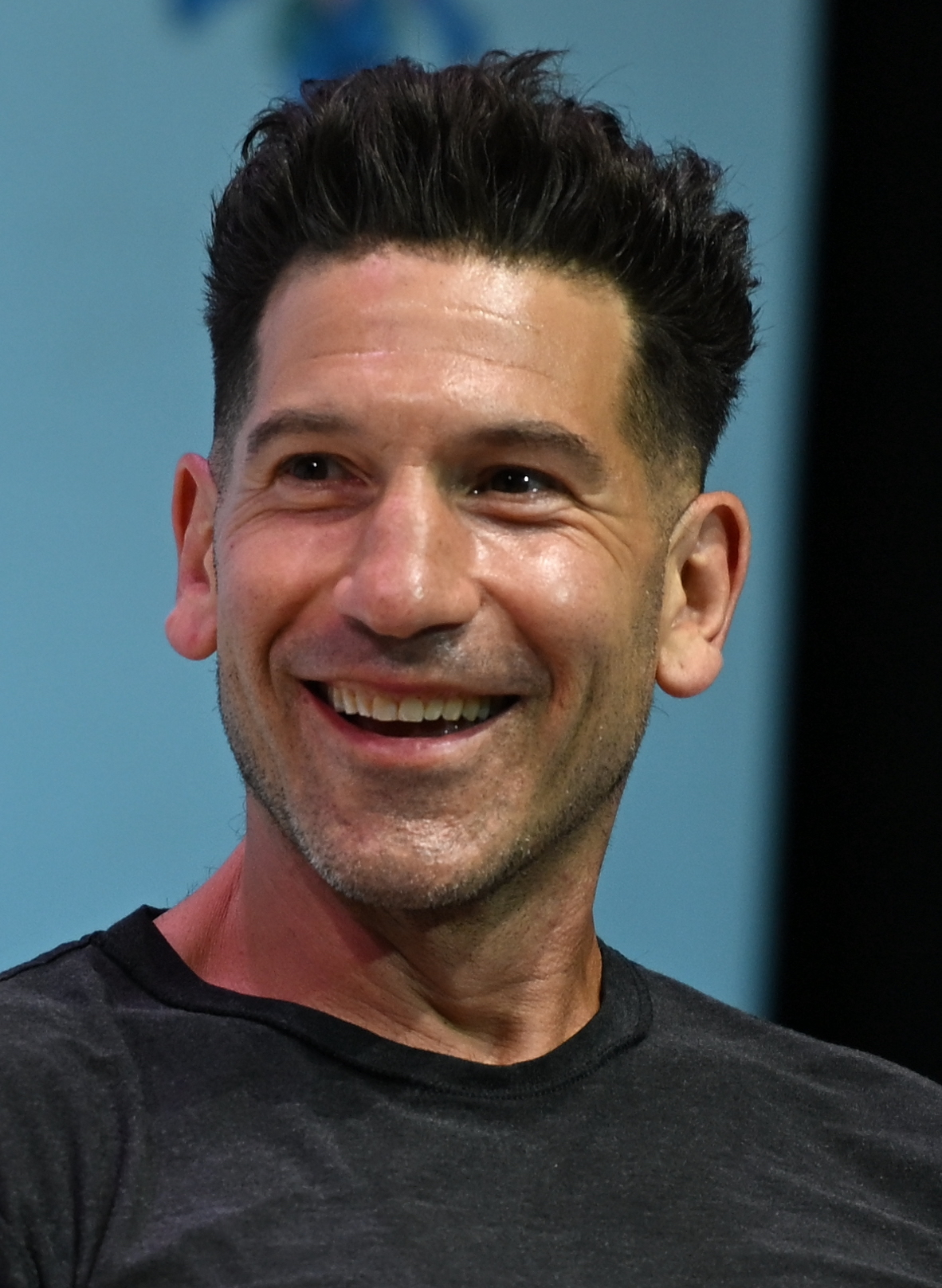
Jon Bernthal, Outstanding Guest Actor in a Comedy Series winner

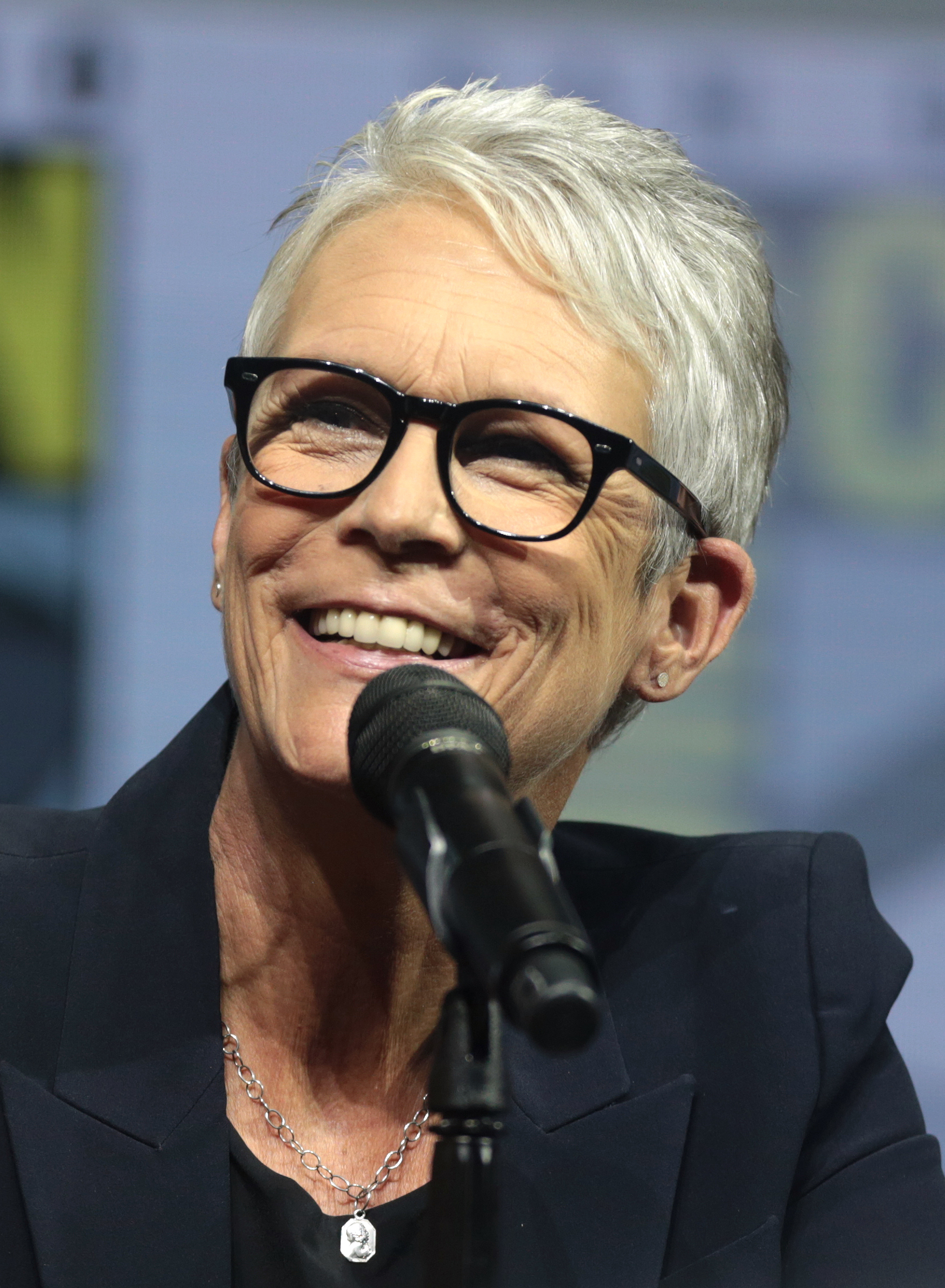
Jamie Lee Curtis, Outstanding Guest Actress in a Comedy Series winner

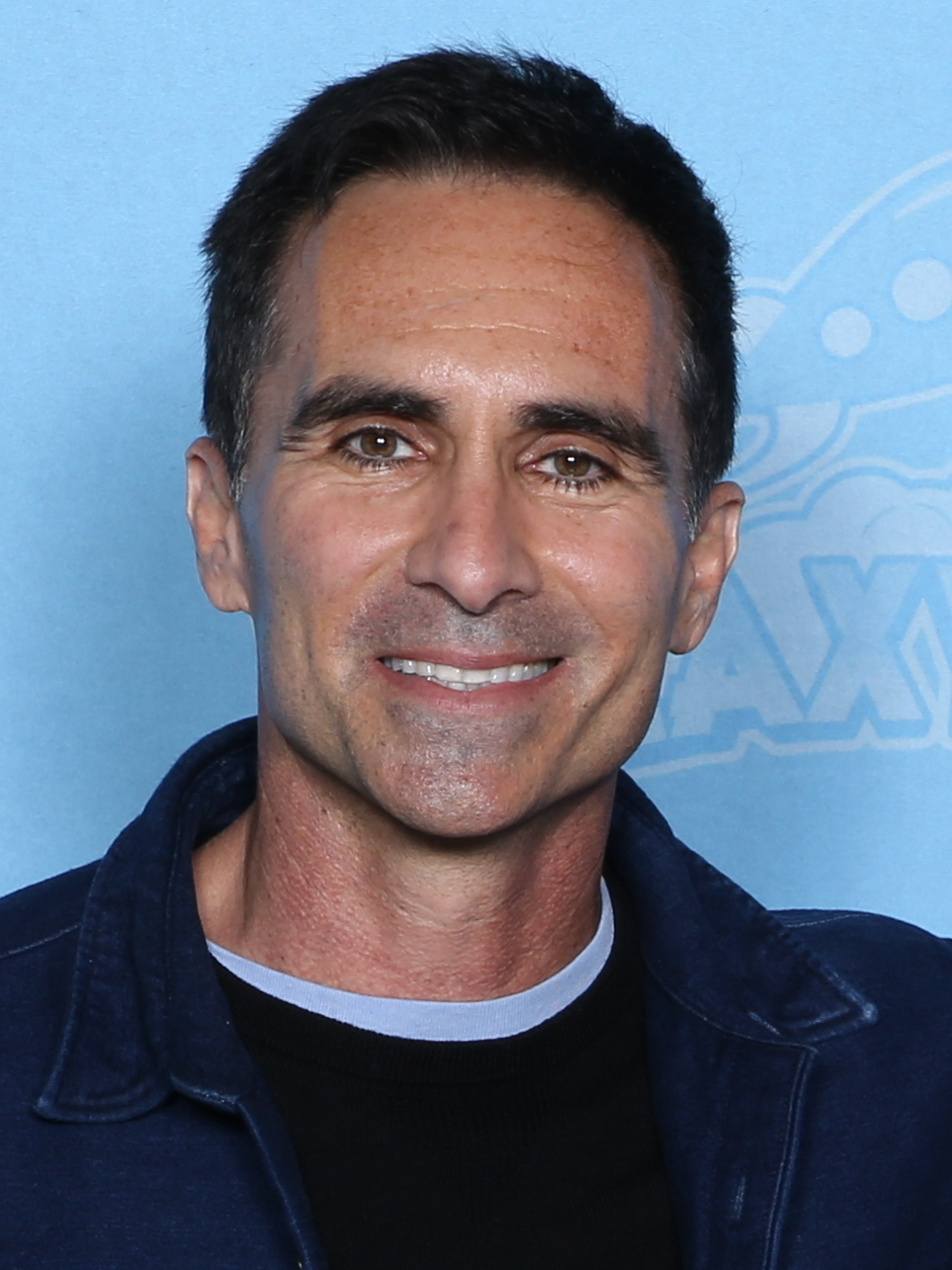
Nestor Carbonell, Outstanding Guest Actor in a Drama Series winner

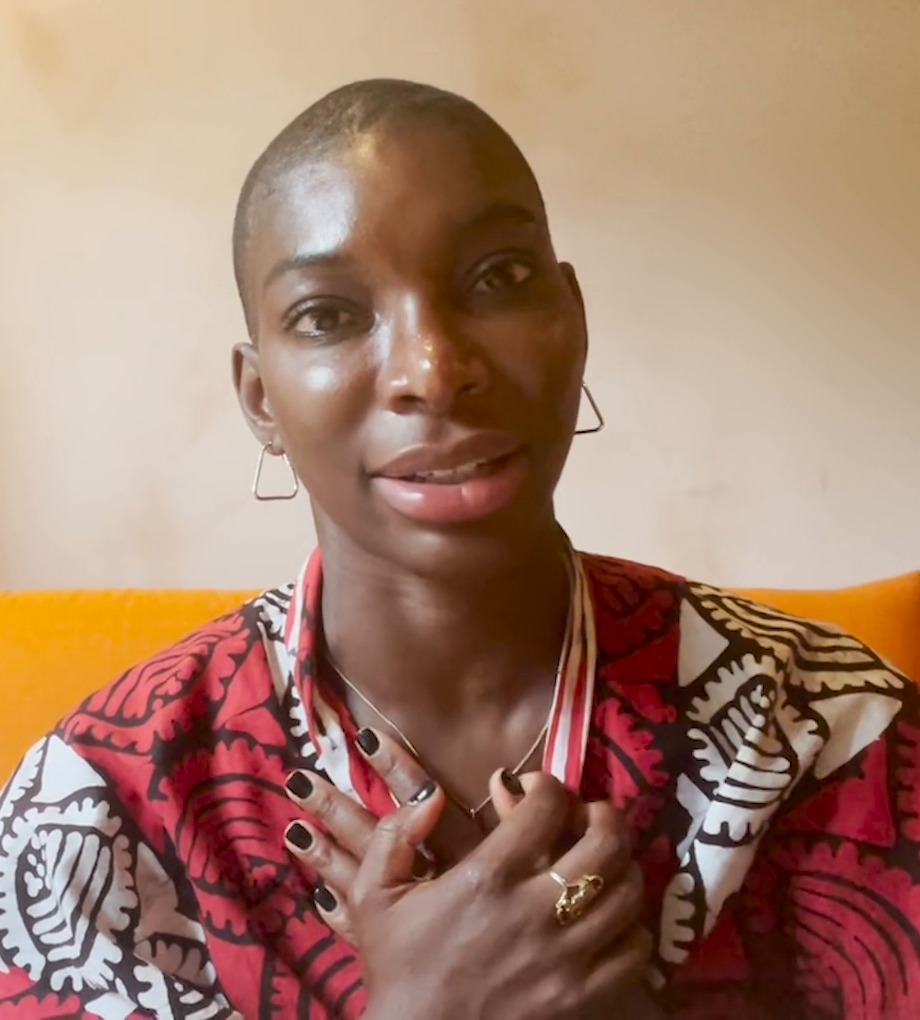
Michaela Coel, Outstanding Guest Actress in a Drama Series winner

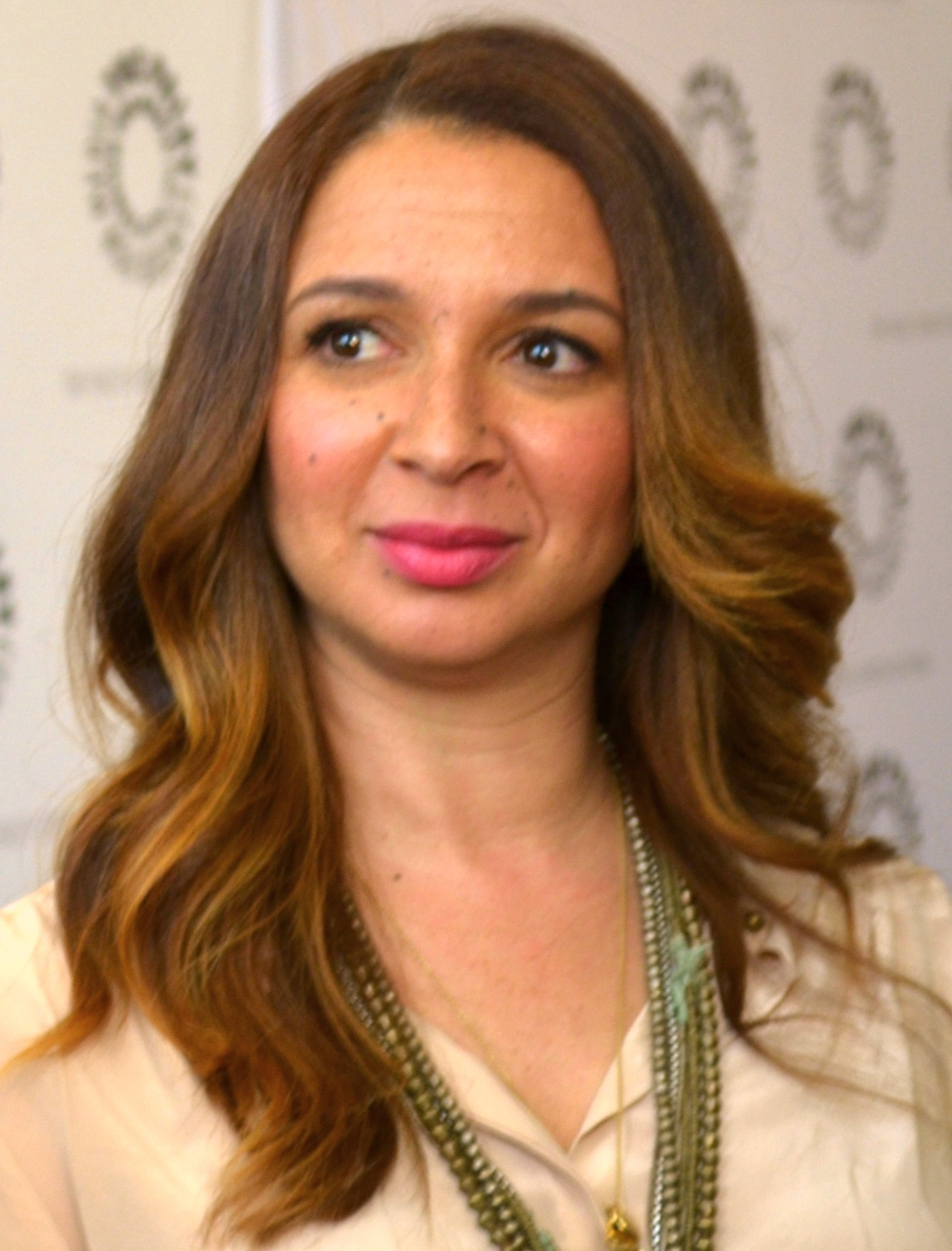
Maya Rudolph, Outstanding Character Voice-Over Performance winner

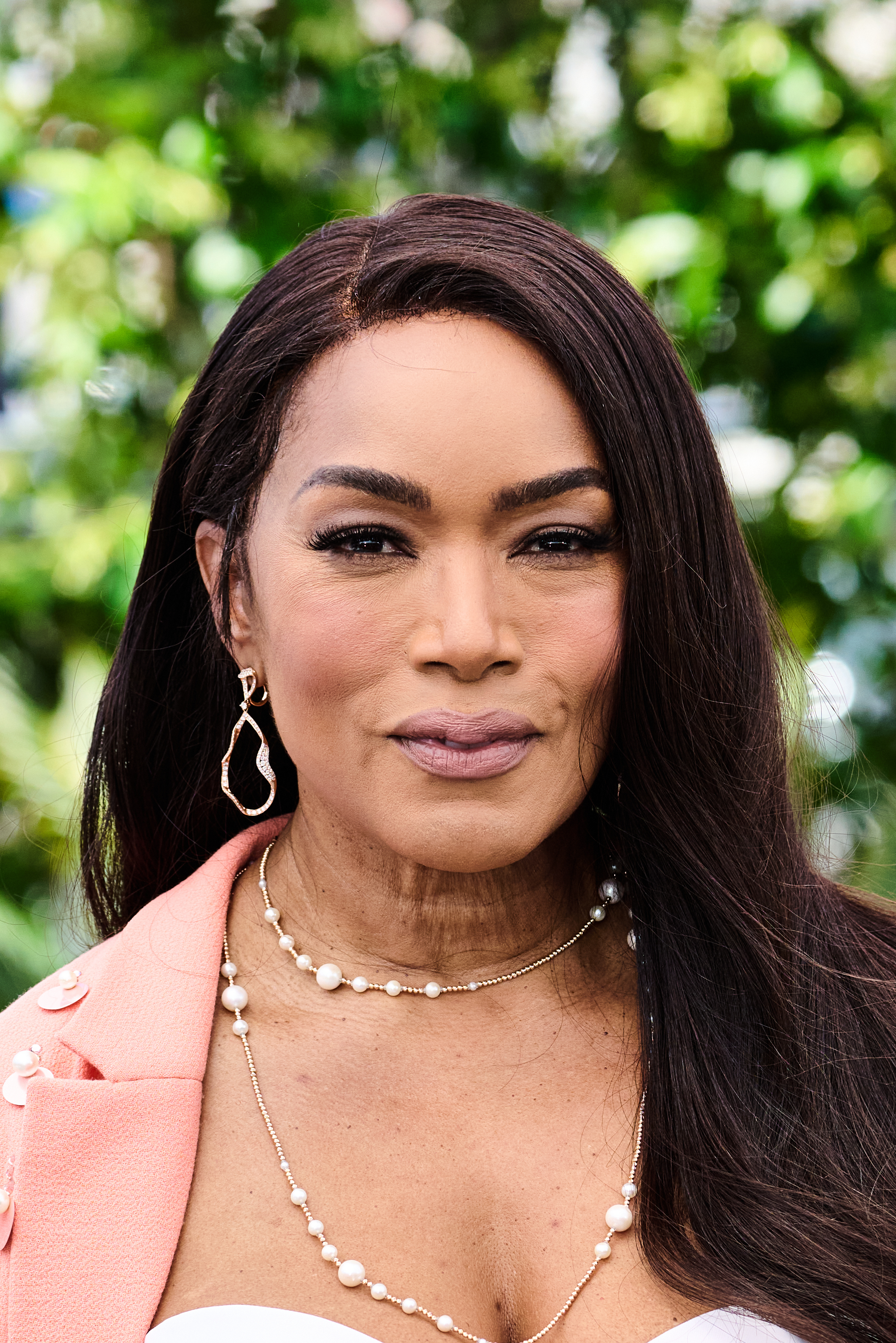
Angela Bassett, Outstanding Narrator winner

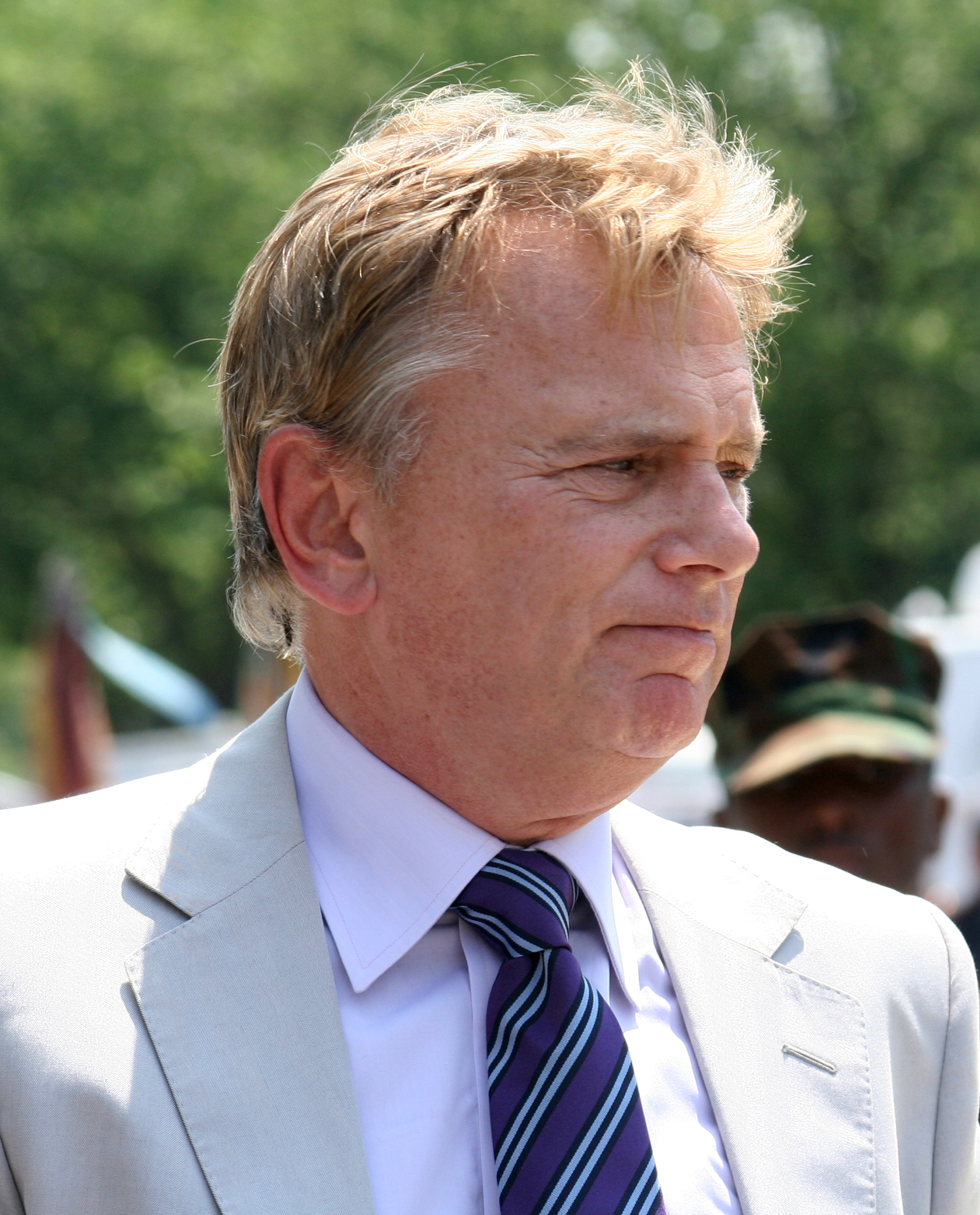
Pat Sajak, Outstanding Host for a Game Show winner

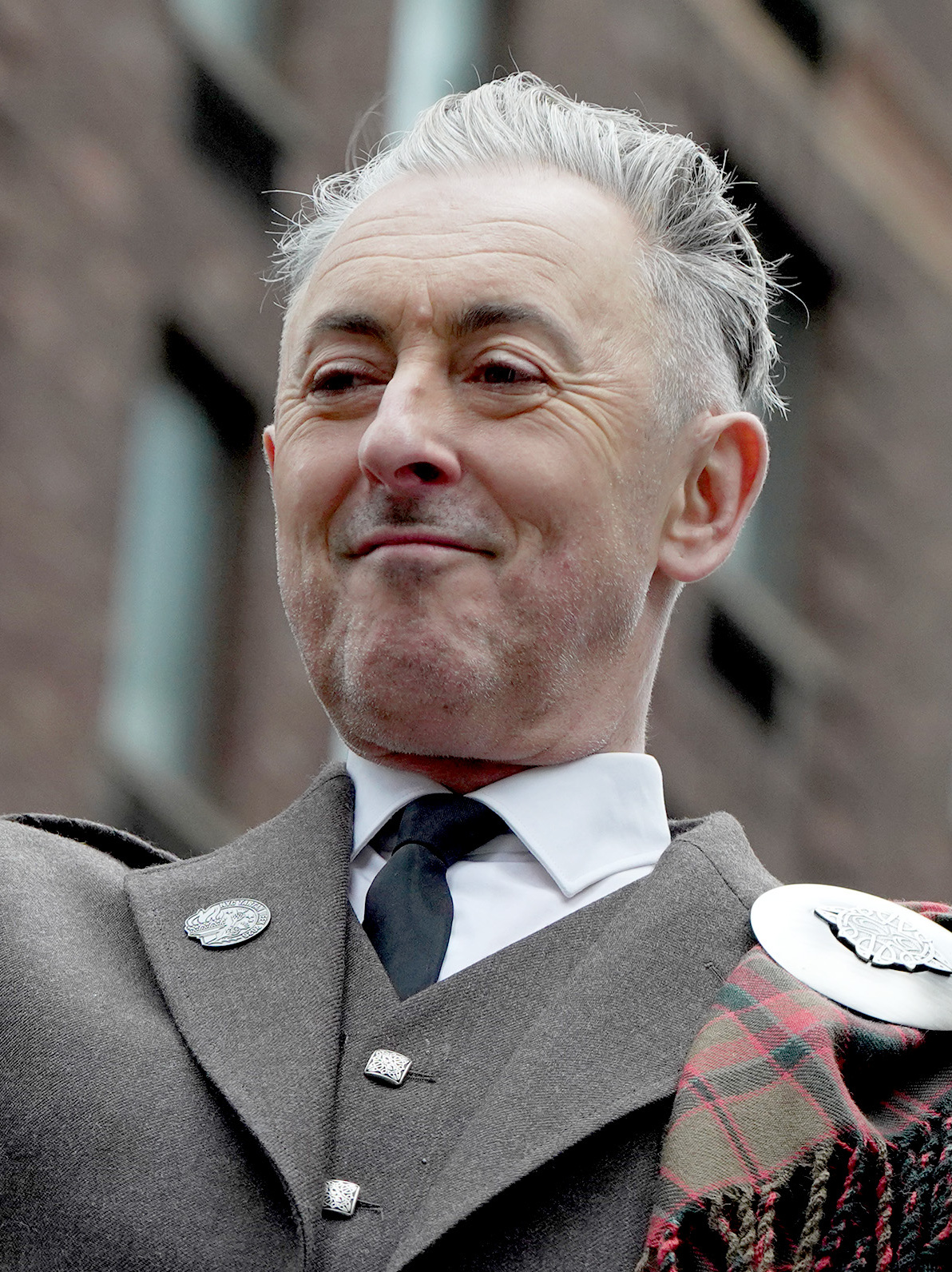
Alan Cumming, Outstanding Host for a Reality or Reality Competition Program winner

Winners are listed first, highlighted in boldface, and indicated with a double dagger (‡). (Note: The outlets listed for each program are the U.S. broadcasters or streaming services identified in the nominations, which for some international productions are different than the broadcaster(s) that originally commissioned the program. Programs broadcast by HBO or Max were listed as "HBO Max" in the nominations list; only the original broadcaster is listed below.) Sections are based upon the categories listed in the 2023–2024 Emmy rules and procedures. Area awards and juried awards are denoted next to the category names as applicable. (Note: Area awards are non-competitive; any nominee with at least 90% approval receives an Emmy. If no nominee receives 90% approval, the nominee with the highest approval receives an Emmy; for area awards in picture editing and sound mixing, there is an additional requirement that the highest-rated nominee must have at least 50% approval.; Juried awards generally do not have nominations; instead, all entrants are screened before members of the appropriate peer group, and one, more than one, or no entry is awarded an Emmy based on the jury's vote.) For simplicity, producers who received nominations for program awards have been omitted.

=== Programs ===
**Outstanding Television Movie**: **Quiz Lady (Hulu)**‡; Mr. Monk's Last Case: A Monk Movie (Peacock); Red, White & Royal Blue (Prime Video); Scoop (Netflix); Unfrosted (Netflix)	**Outstanding Variety Special (Live)**: **The Oscars (ABC)**‡; The Apple Music Super Bowl LVIII Halftime Show Starring Usher (CBS); 66th Grammy Awards (CBS); The Greatest Roast of All Time: Tom Brady (Netflix); 76th Annual Tony Awards (CBS)
**Outstanding Variety Special (Pre-Recorded)**: **Dick Van Dyke 98 Years of Magic (CBS)**‡; Billy Joel: The 100th — Live at Madison Square Garden (CBS); Dave Chappelle: The Dreamer (Netflix); Nikki Glaser: Someday You'll Die (HBO); Trevor Noah: Where Was I (Netflix)	**Outstanding Game Show**: **Jeopardy! (ABC / Syndicated)**‡; Celebrity Family Feud (ABC); Password (NBC); The Price Is Right at Night (CBS); Wheel of Fortune (ABC / Syndicated)
**Outstanding Animated Program**: **Blue Eye Samurai: "The Tale of the Ronin and the Bride" (Netflix)**‡; Bob's Burgers: "The Amazing Rudy" (Fox); Scavengers Reign: "The Signal" (Max); The Simpsons: "Night of the Living Wage" (Fox); X-Men '97: "Remember It" (Disney+)	**Outstanding Structured Reality Program**: **Shark Tank (ABC)**‡; Antiques Roadshow (PBS); Diners, Drive-Ins and Dives (Food Network); Love Is Blind (Netflix); Queer Eye (Netflix)
**Outstanding Unstructured Reality Program**: **Welcome to Wrexham (FX)**‡; Below Deck Down Under (Bravo); Love on the Spectrum U.S. (Netflix); RuPaul's Drag Race: Untucked (MTV); Vanderpump Rules (Bravo)	**Outstanding Documentary or Nonfiction Series**: **Beckham (Netflix)**‡; The Jinx — Part Two (HBO); Quiet on Set: The Dark Side of Kids TV (Investigation Discovery); Stax: Soulsville U.S.A. (HBO); Telemarketers (HBO)
**Outstanding Documentary or Nonfiction Special**: **Jim Henson Idea Man (Disney+)**‡; Albert Brooks: Defending My Life (HBO); Girls State (Apple TV+); The Greatest Night in Pop (Netflix); Steve! (Martin) A Documentary in 2 Pieces (Apple TV+)	**Outstanding Hosted Nonfiction Series or Special**: **My Next Guest with David Letterman and John Mulaney (Netflix)**‡; Conan O'Brien Must Go (Max); Finding Your Roots with Henry Louis Gates, Jr. (PBS); How To with John Wilson (HBO); The Reluctant Traveler with Eugene Levy (Apple TV+)
**Exceptional Merit in Documentary Filmmaking (Juried)**: **Going to Mars: The Nikki Giovanni Project (HBO)**‡; Beyond Utopia (Independent Lens) (PBS); Stamped from the Beginning (Netflix)	**Outstanding Short Form Comedy, Drama or Variety Series**: **Only Murders in the Building: One Killer Question: Season 3 (Hulu)**‡; Carpool Karaoke: The Series (Apple TV+); The Eric Andre Show (Adult Swim); Late Night with Seth Meyers: Corrections (NBC); Real Time with Bill Maher: Overtime (HBO)
**Outstanding Short Form Nonfiction or Reality Series**: **Shōgun – The Making of Shōgun (FX)**‡; After the Cut — The Daily Show (YouTube); The Crown: Farewell to a Royal Epic (Netflix); Hacks: Bit by Bit (Max); Saturday Night Live Presents: Behind the Sketch (NBC)	**Outstanding Emerging Media Program**: **Fallout: Vault 33 (Prime Video)**‡; Emperor (Meta Quest); The Pirate Queen with Lucy Liu (Meta); Red Rocks Live in VR (Meta / Facebook); Wallace & Gromit in The Grand Getaway (Meta)
**Outstanding Innovation in Emerging Media Programming (Juried)**: **Silent Hill: Ascension (ascension.com)**‡; **What If...? – An Immersive Story (Apple Vision Pro)**‡

=== Performing ===
**Outstanding Guest Actor in a Comedy Series**: **Jon Bernthal – The Bear: "Fishes" as Michael Berzatto (FX)**‡; Matthew Broderick – Only Murders in the Building: "CoBro" as Matthew Broderick (Hulu); Ryan Gosling – Saturday Night Live: "Host: Ryan Gosling" (Note: Also known as "Ryan Gosling: April 13, 2024" according to Peacock and "Ryan Gosling/Chris Stapleton" according to TV Guide. For the purposes of consistency, this list follows what the episode was titled in the official nominations listed as released by the Academy of Television Arts & Sciences.) as host (NBC); Christopher Lloyd – Hacks: "The Deborah Vance Christmas Spectacular" as Larry Arbuckle (Max); Bob Odenkirk – The Bear: "Fishes" as Uncle Lee (FX); Will Poulter – The Bear: "Honeydew" as Luca (FX)	**Outstanding Guest Actress in a Comedy Series**: **Jamie Lee Curtis – The Bear: "Fishes" as Donna Berzatto (FX)**‡; Olivia Colman – The Bear: "Forks" as Chef Terry (FX); Kaitlin Olson – Hacks: "The Roast of Deborah Vance" as DJ Vance (Max); Da'Vine Joy Randolph – Only Murders in the Building: "Sitzprobe" as Donna Williams (Hulu); Maya Rudolph – Saturday Night Live: "Host: Maya Rudolph" as host (NBC); Kristen Wiig – Saturday Night Live: "Host: Kristen Wiig" as host (NBC)
**Outstanding Guest Actor in a Drama Series**: **Néstor Carbonell – Shōgun: "Anjin" as Vasco Rodrigues (FX)**‡; Paul Dano – Mr. & Mrs. Smith: "A Breakup" as Harris Materbach (Prime Video); Tracy Letts – Winning Time: The Rise of the Lakers Dynasty: "The New World" as Jack McKinney (HBO); Jonathan Pryce – Slow Horses: "Footprints" as David Cartwright (Apple TV+); John Turturro – Mr. & Mrs. Smith: "Second Date" as Eric Shane (Prime Video)	**Outstanding Guest Actress in a Drama Series**: **Michaela Coel – Mr. & Mrs. Smith: "Infidelity" as Bev (Prime Video)**‡; Claire Foy – The Crown: "Sleep, Dearie Sleep" as Queen Elizabeth II (Netflix); Marcia Gay Harden – The Morning Show: "Update Your Priors" as Maggie Brener (Apple TV+); Sarah Paulson – Mr. & Mrs. Smith: "Couples Therapy (Naked & Afraid)" as Therapist (Prime Video); Parker Posey – Mr. & Mrs. Smith: "Double Date" as Second Other Jane (Prime Video)
**Outstanding Performer in a Short Form Comedy or Drama Series**: **Eric André – The Eric Andre Show as Eric André (Adult Swim)**‡; Desi Lydic – Desi Lydic Foxsplains – The Daily Show as Desi Lydic (YouTube); Mena Suvari – RZR as Detective Thompson (Gala Film)	**Outstanding Character Voice-Over Performance**: **Maya Rudolph – Big Mouth: "The Ambition Gremlin" as Connie the Hormone Monstress (Netflix)**‡; Hank Azaria – The Simpsons: "Cremains of the Day" as Moe Szyslak (Fox); Alex Borstein – Family Guy: "Teacher's Heavy Pet" as Lois Griffin (Fox); Sterling K. Brown – Invincible: "I Thought You Were Stronger" as Angstrom Levy / Angstrom #646 (Prime Video); Hannah Waddingham – Krapopolis: "Big Man on Hippocampus" as Deliria (Fox)
**Outstanding Narrator**: **Angela Bassett – Queens: "African Queens" (Nat Geo)**‡; Sir David Attenborough – Planet Earth III: "Human" (BBC America); Morgan Freeman – Life on Our Planet: "Chapter 1: The Rules of Life" (Netflix); Paul Rudd – Secrets of the Octopus: "Masterminds" (Nat Geo); Octavia Spencer – Lost Women of Highway 20: "Vanished" (Investigation Discovery)	**Outstanding Host for a Game Show**: **Pat Sajak – Wheel of Fortune (ABC / Syndicated)**‡; Steve Harvey – Celebrity Family Feud (ABC); Ken Jennings – Jeopardy! (ABC / Syndicated); Jane Lynch – Weakest Link (NBC); Keke Palmer – Password (NBC)
**Outstanding Host for a Reality or Reality Competition Program**: **Alan Cumming – The Traitors (Peacock)**‡; RuPaul Charles – RuPaul's Drag Race (MTV); Daymond John, Barbara Corcoran, Mark Cuban, Lori Greiner, Kevin O'Leary and Robert Herjavec – Shark Tank (ABC); Kristen Kish – Top Chef (Bravo); Jeff Probst – Survivor (CBS)

=== Animation ===
**Outstanding Individual Achievement in Animation (Juried)**
- **Adventure Time: Fionna and Cake: "The Winter King" – Alex Small-Butera (SmallBu) (Max)**‡
- **Blue Eye Samurai: "The Great Fire of 1657" – Toby Wilson (Netflix)**‡
- **Blue Eye Samurai: "Hammerscale" – Ryan O'Loughlin (Netflix)**‡
- **Blue Eye Samurai: "Nothing Broken" – Brian Kesinger (Netflix)**‡
- **Clone High: "Let's Try This Again" – Tara Billinger (Max)**‡
- **In the Know: "Yogurt Week" – Jan Maas (Peacock)**‡
- **Scavengers Reign: "The Dream" – Noémie Leroux (Max)**‡

=== Art Direction ===
**Outstanding Production Design for a Narrative Contemporary Program (One Hour or More) (Area)**: **The Crown: "Sleep, Dearie Sleep" – Martin Childs, Mark Raggett, and Alison Harvey (Netflix)**‡; Fargo: "Trials and Tribulations" – Trevor Smith, Cathy Cowan, and Amber Humphries (FX); The Gentlemen: "Tackle Tommy Woo Woo" – Martyn John, Fiona Gavin, and Linda Wilson (Netflix); The Morning Show: "The Kármán Line" – Nelson Coates, Thomas Wilkins, and Lauree Martell (Apple TV+); True Detective: Night Country – Daniel Taylor, Jo Riddell, and Charlotte Dirickx (HBO)	**Outstanding Production Design for a Narrative Period or Fantasy Program (One Hour or More) (Area)**: **Shōgun: "Anjin" – Helen Jarvis, Chris Beach, Lisa Lancaster, and Jonathan Lancaster (FX)**‡; Fallout: "The End" – Howard Cummings, Laura Ballinger Gardner, and Regina Graves (Prime Video); The Gilded Age: "Close Enough to Touch" – Bob Shaw, Larry W. Brown, and Lisa Crivelli Scoppa (HBO); Palm Royale: "Maxine's Like a Dellacorte" – Jon Carlos, Mark Taylor, Amelia Brooke, and Ellen Reede (Apple TV+); Ripley – David Gropman, Karen Schulz Gropman, Alex Santucci, and Alessandra Querzola (Netflix)
**Outstanding Production Design for a Narrative Program (Half-Hour) (Area)**: **Only Murders in the Building: "Opening Night" – Patrick Howe, Casey Smith, and Rich Murray (Hulu)**‡; The Bear: "Omelette" – Merje Veski, Lisa Korpan, and Eric Frankel (FX); Frasier: "Moving In" – Glenda Rovello, Conny Boettger-Marinos, and Amy Feldman (Paramount+); Hacks: "Yes, And" – Rob Tokarz, Jeanine A. Ringer, and Jennifer Lukehart (Max); What We Do in the Shadows: "A Weekend at Morrigan Manor" – Shayne Fox, Jody Clement, Aaron Noël, and Kerri Wylie (FX)	**Outstanding Production Design for a Variety or Reality Series**: **Saturday Night Live: "Host: Josh Brolin" – Joe DeTullio, Kenneth MacLeod, Melissa Shakun, and Kimberly Kachougian (NBC)**‡; Last Week Tonight with John Oliver: "Freight Trains" – Eric Morrell and Amanda Carzoli (HBO); The Late Show with Stephen Colbert: "February 11, 2024: Super Bowl Episode with John Krasinski and Ryan Gosling and a Special Appearance by Jon Stewart" / "March 13, 2024: The Biden-Trump Rematch, Lara Trump Makes the RNC Great Again, RFK Jr. Courts Aaron Rodgers for VP; Stephen Meets "The Shower Witch"; Paul Rudd; Cecilia Vega; Jon Hamm; Amy Sedaris" – Jim Fenhagen, Larry Hartman, Riley Mellon, and Brendan Hurley (CBS); RuPaul's Drag Race: "RDR Live!" / "Werq the World" – Gianna Costa, Jen Chu, and Gavin Smith (MTV); Squid Game: The Challenge: "War" – Mathieu Weekes, Ben Norman, and Lizzie Chambers (Netflix)
**Outstanding Production Design for a Variety Special**: **The Oscars – Misty Buckley, Alana Billingsley, John Zuiker, and Margaux Lapresle (ABC)**‡; Dick Van Dyke 98 Years of Magic – Steve Morden, James Yarnell, and John Sparano (CBS); 66th Grammy Awards – Julio Himede, Kristen Merlino, Gloria Lamb, Ellen Jaworski, and Kaydee Lavorin Friel (CBS); Hannah Waddingham: Home for Christmas – Misty Buckley, Laura Woodroffe, and Richard Olivieri (Apple TV+); 76th Annual Tony Awards – Steve Bass, Aaron Black, and Star Theodos Kahn (CBS)

=== Casting ===
**Outstanding Casting for a Comedy Series**: **The Bear – Jeanie Bacharach, Maggie Bacharach, Jennifer Rudnicke, Mickie Paskal, and AJ Links (FX)**‡; Abbott Elementary – Wendy O'Brien and Chris Gehrt (ABC); Curb Your Enthusiasm – Allison Jones (HBO); Hacks – Jeanne McCarthy and Nicole Abellera Hallman (Max); Only Murders in the Building – Bernard Telsey, Tiffany Little Canfield, and Destiny Lilly (Hulu)	**Outstanding Casting for a Drama Series**: **Shōgun – Laura Schiff, Carrie Audino, Kei Kawamura, Maureen Webb, and Colleen Bolton (FX)**‡; The Crown – Robert Sterne (Netflix); The Morning Show – Victoria Thomas (Apple TV+); Mr. & Mrs. Smith – Carmen Cuba, Candice Alustiza-Lee, Teresa Razzauti, and Alejandro Reza (Prime Video); Slow Horses – Nina Gold (Apple TV+)
**Outstanding Casting for a Limited or Anthology Series or Movie**: **Baby Reindeer – Nina Gold and Martin Ware (Netflix)**‡; Fargo – Rachel Tenner, Jackie Lind, Stephanie Gorin, and Rhonda Fisekci (FX); Feud: Capote vs. The Swans – Alexa L. Fogel (FX); Ripley – Avy Kaufman, Francesco Vedovati, and Barbara Giordani (Netflix); True Detective: Night Country – Francine Maisler, Deborah Schildt, and Alda B. Gudjónsdóttir (HBO)	**Outstanding Casting for a Reality Program**: **Love on the Spectrum U.S. – Cian O'Clery, Sean Bowman, Marina Nieto Ritger, and Emma Choate (Netflix)**‡; The Amazing Race – Jesse Tannenbaum, Alex Stern, Pollyanna Jacobs, and Pedro Gomez (CBS); The Golden Bachelor – Jacqui Pitman, John Kennamann, and Lindsay Liles (ABC); RuPaul's Drag Race – Goloka Bolte, Ethan Petersen, Adam Cook, and Michelle Redwine (MTV); Squid Game: The Challenge – Rachael Stubbins, Emma Shearer, Robyn Kass, and Erika Dobrin (Netflix)

=== Choreography ===
**Outstanding Choreography for Variety or Reality Programming (Area)**: **76th Annual Tony Awards: "Opening Number" / "Lifetime Achievement" – Karla Puno Garcia (CBS)**‡; Dancing with the Stars: "Moon River" / "La Vie en rose" – Valentin Chmerkovskiy and Jenna Johnson (ABC); Dick Van Dyke 98 Years of Magic: "Step in Time" – Alison Faulk and Kiki Nyemchek (CBS); The Oscars: "I'm Just Ken" / "In Memoriam" – Mandy Moore (ABC); RuPaul's Drag Race: "Dance!" / "Queen of Wind" / "Power" – Jamal Sims (MTV)	**Outstanding Choreography for Scripted Programming (Area)**: **The Idol: "Rehearsal" / "Music Video Shoot" / "Dollhouse" – Nina McNeely (HBO)**‡; Only Murders in the Building: "Oliver's Dream Sequence" / "Creatures of the Night" – John Carrafa (Hulu); Palm Royale: "The Rhumba" / "Maxine's Entrance" – Brooke Lipton (Apple TV+); Physical: "Jean Franc's Advanced Aerobics Class" / "Figure 8's Commercial" / "Xanadu & Dreams" – Jennifer Hamilton (Apple TV+)

=== Cinematography ===
**Outstanding Cinematography for a Multi-Camera Series (Half-Hour)**: **How I Met Your Father: "Okay Fine, It's a Hurricane" – Gary Baum (Hulu)**‡; Bob Hearts Abishola: "These Giants Are Flexible" – Patti Lee (CBS); The Conners: "Fire and Vice" – Donald A. Morgan (ABC); Frasier: "Reindeer Games" – Gary Baum (Paramount+); Night Court: "A Night Court Before Christmas" – Wayne Kennan (NBC); The Upshaws: "Forbidden Fruit" – Chuck Ozeas (Netflix)	**Outstanding Cinematography for a Single-Camera Series (Half-Hour)**: **The Bear: "Forks" – Andrew Wehde (FX)**‡; Hacks: "Just for Laughs" – Adam Bricker (Max); Physical: "Like a Rocket" – Jimmy Lindsey (Apple TV+); Reservation Dogs: "Deer Lady" – Mark Schwartzbard (FX); Sugar: "Starry Eyed" – Richard Rutkowski (Apple TV+)
**Outstanding Cinematography for a Series (One Hour)**: **Shōgun: "Crimson Sky" – Sam McCurdy (FX)**‡; The Crown: "Ritz" – Sophia Olsson (Netflix); The Crown: "Sleep, Dearie Sleep" – Adriano Goldman (Netflix); Shōgun: "Anjin" – Christopher Ross (FX); 3 Body Problem: "Judgment Day" – Martin Ahlgren (Netflix); Winning Time: The Rise of the Lakers Dynasty: "Beat L.A." – Todd Banhazl (HBO)	**Outstanding Cinematography for a Limited or Anthology Series or Movie**: **Ripley: "V Lucio" – Robert Elswit (Netflix)**‡; All the Light We Cannot See: "Episode 4" – Tobias Schliessler (Netflix); Fargo: "The Tragedy of the Commons" – Dana Gonzales (FX); Griselda: "Middle Management" – Armando Salas (Netflix); Lessons in Chemistry: "Little Miss Hastings" – Zachary Galler (Apple TV+); True Detective: Night Country: "Part 6" – Florian Hoffmeister (HBO)
**Outstanding Cinematography for a Nonfiction Program**: **Girls State – Laura Hudock, Laela Kilbourn, Daniel Carter, Erynn Patrick Lamont, Keri Oberly, Thorsten Thielow, and Martina Radwan (Apple TV+)**‡; Beckham: "The Kick" – Tim Cragg (Netflix); Jim Henson Idea Man – Igor Martinovic and Vanja Cernjul (Disney+); Our Planet II: "Chapter 1: World on the Move" – Brad Bestelink and Kyle McBurnie (Netflix); Planet Earth III: "Extremes" – Luke Nelson and John Shier (BBC America)	**Outstanding Cinematography for a Reality Program**: **Life Below Zero: "Bulletproof" – Charlie Beck, Michael Cheeseman, Danny Day, and Pedro Delbrey (Nat Geo)**‡; The Amazing Race – Joshua Gitersonke, Bryan T. Adams, Kathryn Barrows, Kurt Carpenter, Petr Cikhart, Diego J. Contreras, David D'Angelo, Matthew Di Girolamo, Rob Gowler, Adam Haisinger, Jamie Holland, Kevin R. Johnson, Jay Kaufman, Ian Kerr, Tim Laks, Regan Letourneau, Danny Long, Lucas Kenna Mertes, Ryan Shaw, Alan Weeks, Stephen A. Coleman, and Willie Shipp (CBS); Survivor – Peter Wery, Scott Duncan, Russ Fill, Tim Barker, Marc Bennett, Paulo Castillo, Rodney Chauvin, Chris Ellison, Ben Gamble, Nixon George, Marcus Hebbelmann, Derek Hoffmann, Matthias Hoffmann, Toby Hogan, Derek Holt, Efrain "Mofi" Laguna, Ian Miller, Nico Nyoni, Paul Peddinghaus, Nejc Poberaj, Louis Powell, Thomas Pretorius, Jovan Sales, Erick Sarmiento, Dirk Steyn, John Tattersall, Holly Thompson, Paulo Velozo, Cullum Andrews, Christopher Barker, Granger Scholtz, Nic Van Der Westhuizen, and Dwight Winston (CBS); The Traitors: "The Funeral" – Siggi Rosen-Rawlings and Matt Wright (Peacock); Welcome to Wrexham – Craig Hastings, Ed Edwards, James Melrose, Craig Murdoch, Verdy Oliver, Esther Vardy, Leighton Cox, Tom Reece, Gareth Roberts, Joe Clifford, Joby Newson, Mike Staniforth, and Dillon Scheps (FX)

=== Commercial ===
**Outstanding Commercial**
- **"Fuzzy Feelings" – Hungry Man and TBWA\ Media Arts Lab (Apple – iPhone + Mac)**‡
  - "Album Cover" – O Positive and Apple (Apple iPhone 15)
  - "Best Friends" – O Positive and Mother (Uber One / Uber Eats)
  - "Just Joking" – Smuggler and BBDO New York (Sandy Hook Promise)
  - "Like a Good Neighbaaa" – O Positive and Highdive (State Farm)
  - "Michael CeraVe" – Prettybird and Ogilvy PR (CeraVe Moisturizing Cream)

=== Costumes ===
**Outstanding Period Costumes for a Series**: **Shōgun: "Ladies of the Willow World" – Carlos Rosario, Carole Griffin, Kristen Bond, Kenichi Tanaka, and Paula Plachy (FX)**‡; The Gilded Age: "You Don't Even Like Opera" – Kasia Walicka Maimone, Patrick Wiley, Isabelle Simone, Denise Andres, and Rebecca Levin Lore (HBO); The New Look: "What a Day This Has Been" – Karen Muller Serreau, Catherine Boisgontier, and Emmanuelle Pertus (Apple TV+); Palm Royale: "Maxine Throws a Party" – Alix Friedberg, Carolyn Dessert, Leigh Bell, Lindsay Newton, and Valerie Keiser (Apple TV+); Winning Time: The Rise of the Lakers Dynasty: "What Is and What Should Never Be" – Emma Potter, Maressa Richtmyer, and Shannon Moore (HBO)	**Outstanding Period Costumes for a Limited or Anthology Series or Movie**: **Feud: Capote vs. The Swans: "Pilot" – Lou Eyrich, Leah Katznelson, Emily O'Connor, Laura McCarthy, Hanna Shea, and Miwa Ishii (FX)**‡; Griselda: "Paradise Lost" – Safowa Bright Bitzelberger, Joseph Castellanos, Jennifer Marlin, Serena Duffin, and Joanne Mills Trotta (Netflix); Lessons in Chemistry: "Little Miss Hastings" – Mirren Gordon-Crozier, Jen Kennedy, and Kelli Hagen (Apple TV+); Mary & George: "Not So Much as Love as by Awe" – Annie Symons, Cédric Andries, Courtney McClain, Jovana Gospavic, and Jason Airey (Starz); Ripley: "IV La Dolce Vita" – Maurizio Millenotti, Gianni Casalnuovo, Ernest Camilleri, Teresa D'Arienzo, and Francesco Morabito (Netflix)
**Outstanding Fantasy/Sci-Fi Costumes (Area)**: **Ahsoka: "Part Eight: The Jedi, the Witch, and the Warlord" – Shawna Trpcic, Elissa Alcala, and Devon Patterson (Disney+)**‡; Echo: "Lowak" – Ambre Wrigley, Kizzie Martin Lillas, Kristina Elaine Taylor, Garnet Filo, and Amanda Steeley (Disney+); Fallout: "The End" – Amy Westcott, Amy Burt, Wendy Yang, Jonathan Knipscher, and Cherie Cunningham Collins (Prime Video); Loki: "1893" – Christine Wada, Harriet Kendall, Kristen Ernst-Brown, and Tom Hornsby (Disney+); What We Do in the Shadows: "Pride Parade" – Laura Montgomery, Kay Jameson, Amy Sztulwark, and Anna Viksne (FX)	**Outstanding Contemporary Costumes for a Series**: **The Crown: "Sleep, Dearie Sleep" – Amy Roberts, Giles Gale, and Sidonie Roberts (Netflix)**‡; The Bear: "Fishes" – Courtney Wheeler, Lariana Santiago, and Steven "Rage" Rehage (FX); Hacks: "Just for Laughs" – Kathleen Felix-Hager, Karen Bellamy, and Rory Cunningham (Max); Only Murders in the Building: "Sitzprobe" – Dana Covarrubias, Kathleen Gerlach, and Abby Geoghegan (Hulu); The Righteous Gemstones: "For I Know the Plans I Have for You" – Christina Flannery, Maura "Maude" Cusick, and Rebecca DeNoewer (HBO)
**Outstanding Contemporary Costumes for a Limited or Anthology Series or Movie**: **American Horror Story: Delicate: "The Auteur" – Jacqueline Demeterio, Jessica Zavala, Jennifer Salim, Jose Bantula, and Jillian Daidone (FX)**‡; Baby Reindeer: "Episode 4" – Mekel Bailey and Imogen Holness (Netflix); Fargo: "Insolubilia" – Carol Case, Charl Boettger, and Michelle Carr (FX); The Regime: "The Heroes' Banquet" – Consolata Boyle, Marion Weise, Bobbie Edwards, Johanna Garrad, and Jane Law (HBO); True Detective: Night Country: "Part 5" – Alex Bovaird, Linda Gardar, Rebekka Jónsdóttir, Tina Ulee, Giulia Moschioni, and Brian Sprouse (HBO)	**Outstanding Costumes for Variety, Nonfiction, or Reality Programming (Juried)**: **Taylor Mac's 24-Decade History of Popular Music – Machine Dazzle (HBO)**‡

=== Directing ===
**Outstanding Directing for a Variety Series**: **Saturday Night Live: "Host: Ryan Gosling" – Liz Patrick (NBC)**‡; The Daily Show: "Jon Stewart Returns to The Daily Show" – David Paul Meyer (Comedy Central); Jimmy Kimmel Live!: "Trump Still Mad About Oscars Joke and Thinks Jimmy is Al Pacino, Chris Stapleton's Ballad for John Stamos, Guest Rob McElhenney & the Return of Our Outdoor Stage!" – Andy Fisher (ABC); The Late Show with Stephen Colbert: "December 21, 2023: GOP Wants Biden Kicked Off Ballot, Bankrupt Rudy Hawks Supplements, Elf on the Shelf for Parents; Meanwhile; Anderson Cooper & Andy Cohen; Louis Cato and the Late Show Band" – Jim Hoskinson (CBS)	**Outstanding Directing for a Variety Special**: **The Oscars – Hamish Hamilton (ABC)**‡; Dave Chappelle: The Dreamer – Stan Lathan (Netflix); Dick Van Dyke 98 Years of Magic – Russell Norman (CBS); Tig Notaro: Hello Again – Stephanie Allynne (Prime Video); 76th Annual Tony Awards – Glenn Weiss (CBS); Trevor Noah: Where Was I – David Paul Meyer (Netflix)
**Outstanding Directing for a Documentary/Nonfiction Program**: **Girls State – Amanda McBaine and Jesse Moss (Apple TV+)**‡; Albert Brooks: Defending My Life – Rob Reiner (HBO); Beckham: "What Makes David Run" – Fisher Stevens (Netflix); The Greatest Night in Pop – Bao Nguyen (Netflix); Jim Henson Idea Man – Ron Howard (Disney+); Steve! (Martin) A Documentary in 2 Pieces – Morgan Neville (Apple TV+)	**Outstanding Directing for a Reality Program**: **Love on the Spectrum U.S.: "Episode 7" – Cian O'Clery (Netflix)**‡; RuPaul's Drag Race: "Grand Finale" – Nick Murray (MTV); Squid Game: The Challenge: "Red Light, Green Light" – Diccon Ramsay (Netflix); The Traitors: "Betrayers, Fakes and Fraudsters" – Ben Archard (Peacock); Welcome to Wrexham: "Shaun's Vacation" – Bryan Rowland (FX)

=== Hairstyling ===
**Outstanding Contemporary Hairstyling**: **The Morning Show: "The Kármán Line" – Nicole Venables, Jennifer Petrovich, Janine Thompson, and Lona Vigi (Apple TV+)**‡; Abbott Elementary: "Mother's Day" – Moira Frazier, Dustin Osborne, and Christina Joseph (ABC); The Bear: "Fishes" – Ally Vickers, Angela Brasington, and Melanie Shaw (FX); Hacks: "Yes, And" – Jennifer Bell (Max); Only Murders in the Building: "Opening Night" – Jameson Eaton, Jimmy Goode, Leah Loukas, and J. Roy Helland (Hulu)	**Outstanding Period or Fantasy/Sci-Fi Hairstyling (Area)**: **Shōgun: "A Stick of Time" – Sanna Kaarina Seppanen, Mariah Crawley, Madison Gillespie, Nakry Keo, and Janis Bekkering (FX)**‡; Ahsoka: "Part One: Master and Apprentice" – Maria Sandoval, Ashleigh Childers, Sallie Ciganovich, Marc Mapile, and Alyn Topper (Disney+); Feud: Capote vs. The Swans: "Hats, Gloves and Effete Homosexuals" – Sean Flanigan, Chris Clark, Joshua Gericke, and Kevin Maybee (FX); The Gilded Age: "You Don't Even Like Opera" – Sean Flanigan, Christine Fennell-Harlan, Jonathan Zane-Sharpless, Aaron Mark Kinchen, Tim Harvey, and Jennifer M. Bullock (HBO); Palm Royale: "Maxine Rolls the Dice" – Karen Bartek, Brittany Madrigal, Cyndra Dunn, Tiffany Bloom, Fríða Aradóttir, and Jill Crosby (Apple TV+)
**Outstanding Hairstyling for a Variety, Nonfiction or Reality Program (Area)**: **Saturday Night Live: "Host: Ryan Gosling" – Jodi Mancuso, Cara Hannah, Inga Thrasher, Joseph Whitmeyer, Amanda Duffy Evans, Chad Harlow, Gina Ferrucci, and Elliott Simpson (NBC)**‡; The Boulet Brothers' Dragula: "Trash Can Children" – Marco Gabellini (Shudder); Dancing with the Stars: "Finale" – Kimi Messina, Dwayne Ross, Joe Matke, Jani Kleinbard, Amber Maher, Marion Rogers, and Brittany Spaulding (ABC); So You Think You Can Dance: "Challenge #2: Broadway" – Crystal Broedel, Cynthia Chapman, Antoinette Black, Ashley Sedmack, Rie "Leay" Cangelosi, and Victor Paz (Fox); We're Here: "Oklahoma, Part 3" – Abdiel "Gloria" Urcullu and Tyler Funicelli (HBO)

=== Lighting Design / Lighting Direction ===
**Outstanding Lighting Design / Lighting Direction for a Variety Series**: **Saturday Night Live: "Host: Kristen Wiig" – Geoffrey Amoral, Rick McGuinness, Trevor Brown, Tim Stasse, William McGuinness, and Frank Grisanti (NBC)**‡; America's Got Talent: "Episode 1818" – Noah Mitz, Will Gossett, Hannah Kerman, Ryan Tanker, Patrick Boozer, Matt Benson, Terrance Ho, and Scott Chmielewski (NBC); American Idol: "Top 14 Reveal" – Tom Sutherland, James Coldicott, Nathan Files, Bobby Grey, Ed Moore, Luke Chantrell, and Scott Chmielewski (ABC); Dancing with the Stars: "Semi-Finals" – Noah Mitz, Patrick Brazil, Andrew Law, Casey Rhodes, Hannah Kerman, Matt Benson, Ed Moore, Stu Wesolik, and Matt McAdam (ABC); The Late Show with Stephen Colbert: "May 21, 2024: Billie Eilish Visits the Late Show for an Engaging Interview with Stephen Colbert and a Performance Off of Her New Album on the Ed Sullivan Theater Stage" – Michael Scricca, Hillary Knox, Constantine Leonardos II, and Tom Carrol (CBS); The Voice: "Live Finale, Part 2" – Oscar Dominguez, Dan Boland, Ronald Wirsgalla, Erin Anderson, Andrew Munie, Jeff Shood, and Terrance Ho (NBC)	**Outstanding Lighting Design / Lighting Direction for a Variety Special**: **Billy Joel: The 100th — Live at Madison Square Garden – Steve Cohen, Mark Foffano, Justin Cheatham, Tad Inferrera, and Adrian Bassett (CBS)**‡; The Apple Music Super Bowl LVIII Halftime Show Starring Usher – Al Gurdon, Ben Green, Harry Forster, Mark Humphrey, Eric Marchwinski, and Alen Sisul (CBS); 66th Grammy Awards – Noah Mitz, Andy O'Reilly, Patrick Boozer, Ryan Tanker, Madigan Stehly, Bryan Klunder, Matt Benson, Will Gossett, Erin Anderson, Terrance Ho, Guy Jones, and Matt Cotter (CBS); 2023 Rock and Roll Hall of Fame Induction Ceremony – Allen Branton, Kevin Lawson, Felix Peralta, George Gountas, Alex Flores, Billy Steinberg, JC Castro, and Bianca Moncada (ABC); 76th Annual Tony Awards – Robert Dickinson, Noah Mitz, Ed McCarthy, Tyler Ericson, Harry Sangmeister, Richie Beck, J.M. Hurley, Ka Lai Wong, Jason Rudolph (CBS)

=== Main Title and Motion Design ===
**Outstanding Main Title Design**: **Shōgun – Nadia Tzuo, Xiaolin Zeng, Alex Silver, Lee Buckley, Ilya Tselyutin, and Evan Larimore (FX)**‡; Fallout – Patrick Clair, Lance Slaton, Raoul Marks, and Scott Geersen (Prime Video); Lessons in Chemistry – Hazel Baird, Rob Cawdery, Ben Jones, and Phil Davies (Apple TV+); Palm Royale – Ronnie Koff, Rob Slychuk, Nader Husseini, and Lexi Gunvaldson (Apple TV+); Silo – Patrick Clair, Raoul Marks, and Lance Slaton (Apple TV+); 3 Body Problem – Patrick Clair, Raoul Marks, and Eddy Herringson (Netflix)	**Outstanding Motion Design (Juried)**: **Jim Henson Idea Man – Mark Thompson, Seamus Walsh, Mark Caballero, Ivan Viaranchyk, Max Strizich, and Momo Zhao (Disney+)**‡

=== Makeup ===
**Outstanding Contemporary Makeup (Non-Prosthetic)**: **The Morning Show: "Strict Scrutiny" – Cindy Williams, Liz Villamarin, Angela Levin, Tracey Levy, Keiko Wedding, and Amy Schmiederer (Apple TV+)**‡; The Bear: "Fishes" – Ignacia Soto-Aguilar, Nicole Rogers, Justine Losoya, and Zsofia Otvos (FX); Hacks: "Yes, And" – Keith Sayer (Max); Only Murders in the Building: "Opening Night" – Arielle Toelke, Kim Taylor, and Joelle Troisi (Hulu); True Detective: Night Country: "Part 5" – Peter Swords King, Natalie Abizadeh, Kerry Skelton, Flóra Karítas Buenaño, and Hafdís Pálsdóttir (HBO)	**Outstanding Period or Fantasy/Sci-Fi Makeup (Non-Prosthetic) (Area)**: **Shōgun: "The Abyss of Life" – Rebecca Lee, Krystal Devlin, Amber Trudeau, Andrea Alcala, Leslie Graham, Krista Hann, Mike Fields, and Emily Walsh (FX)**‡; The Crown: "Ritz" – Cate Hall and Emilie Yong-Mills (Netflix); Fallout: "The Head" – Michael Harvey, Kimberly Amacker, and David Kalahiki (Prime Video); Feud: Capote vs. The Swans: "Beautiful Babe" – Jacqueline Risotto, Kristen Alimena, Christine Hooghuis, and Kyra Panchenko (FX); Palm Royale: "Pilot" – Tricia Sawyer, Marissa Lafayette, Kenny Niederbaumer, Marie DelPrete, Simone Siegl, and Marja Webster (Apple TV+)
**Outstanding Makeup for a Variety, Nonfiction or Reality Program**: **Saturday Night Live: "Host: Ryan Gosling" – Louie Zakarian, Jason Milani, Amy Tagliamonti, Rachel Pagani, Young Bek, Brandon Grether, and Joanna Pisani (NBC)**‡; The Boulet Brothers' Dragula: "Terror in the Woods" – The Boulet Brothers (Shudder); Dancing with the Stars: "Monster Night" – Zena S. Green, Julie Socash, Angela Moos, Donna Bard, Sarah Woolf, Brian Sipe, James MacKinnon, and Tyson Fountaine (ABC); Taylor Mac's 24-Decade History of Popular Music – Anastasia Durasova (HBO); The Voice: "Live Finale, Part 1 and Live Finale, Part 2" – Darcy Gilmore, Gina Ghiglieri, Kristene Bernard, Nikki Carbonetta, Carlene Kearns, Elie Maalouf, Anthony Nguyen, and Marylin Lee Spiegel (NBC); We're Here: "Oklahoma, Part 3" – Tyler "Laila" Devlin and Kalyd Sebastian Odeh (HBO)	**Outstanding Prosthetic Makeup (Area)**: **Shōgun: "A Dream of a Dream" – Toby Lindala, Bree-Anna Lehto, and Suzie Klimack (FX)**‡; Ahsoka: "Part Eight: The Jedi, the Witch, and the Warlord" – Alexei Dmitriew, Cristina Waltz, Ana Gabriela Quinonez Urrego, J. Alan Scott, Ian Goodwin, Cale Thomas, Alex Perrone, and Scott Stoddard (Disney+); Fallout: "The Beginning" – Jake Garber, Rich Krusell, Lindsay Gelfand, Gregory Nicotero, Vincent Van Dyke, and Lisa Forst (Prime Video); True Detective: Night Country: "Part 3" – Dave Elsey, Lou Elsey, and Brian Kinney (HBO); The Witcher: "The Cost of Chaos" – Mark Coulier, Deb Watson, Stephen Murphy, and Josh Weston (Netflix)

=== Music ===
**Outstanding Music Composition for a Series (Original Dramatic Score)**: **Only Murders in the Building: "Sitzprobe" – Siddhartha Khosla (Hulu)**‡; The Crown: "Sleep, Dearie Sleep" – Martin Phipps (Netflix); Mr. & Mrs. Smith: "First Date" – David Fleming (Prime Video); Palm Royale: "Maxine Saves a Cat" – Jeff Toyne (Apple TV+); Shōgun: "Servants of Two Masters" – Atticus Ross, Leopold Ross, and Nick Chuba (FX); Silo: "Freedom Day" – Atli Örvarsson (Apple TV+); Slow Horses: "Strange Games" – Daniel Pemberton and Toydrum (Apple TV+)	**Outstanding Music Composition for a Limited or Anthology Series, Movie or Special (Original Dramatic Score)**: **Lessons in Chemistry: "Book of Calvin" – Carlos Rafael Rivera (Apple TV+)**‡; All the Light We Cannot See: "Episode 4" – James Newton Howard (Netflix); Fargo: "Blanket" – Jeff Russo (FX); Lawmen: Bass Reeves: "Part I" – Chanda Dancy (Paramount+); The Tattooist of Auschwitz: "Episode 1" – Kara Talve and Hans Zimmer (Peacock)
**Outstanding Music Composition for a Documentary Series or Special (Original Dramatic Score)**: **Jim Henson Idea Man – David Fleming (Disney+)**‡; Albert Brooks: Defending My Life – Marc Shaiman (HBO); Beckham: "Seeing Red" – Anže Rozman and Camilo Forero (Netflix); Planet Earth III: "Extremes" – Jacob Shea, Sara Barone, and Hans Zimmer (BBC America); Rock Hudson: All That Heaven Allowed – Laura Karpman (HBO)	**Outstanding Music Direction**: **The Oscars – Rickey Minor (ABC)**‡; The 46th Kennedy Center Honors – Rickey Minor (CBS); Late Night with Seth Meyers: "Episode 1488" – Fred Armisen and Eli Janney (NBC); 2023 Rock and Roll Hall of Fame Induction Ceremony – Adam Blackstone, Don Was, and Omar Edwards (ABC); Saturday Night Live: "Host: Ryan Gosling" – Lenny Pickett, Leon Pendarvis, and Eli Brueggemann (NBC)
**Outstanding Original Music and Lyrics**: **Only Murders in the Building: "Sitzprobe" – "Which of the Pickwick Triplets Did It?" by Benj Pasek, Justin Paul, Marc Shaiman, and Scott Wittman (Hulu)**‡; Girls5eva: "New York" – "The Medium Time" by Sara Bareilles (Netflix); Saturday Night Live: "Host: Maya Rudolph" – "Maya Rudolph Mother's Day Monologue" by Eli Brueggemann, Maya Rudolph, Auguste White, Mike DiCenzo, and Jake Nordwind (NBC); The Tattooist of Auschwitz: "Episode 6" – "Love Will Survive" by Kara Talve, Hans Zimmer, Walter Afanasieff, and Charlie Midnight (Peacock); True Detective: Night Country: "Part 5" – "No Use" by John Hawkes (HBO)	**Outstanding Original Main Title Theme Music**: **Palm Royale – Jeff Toyne (Apple TV+)**‡; Feud: Capote vs. The Swans – Thomas Newman (FX); Lessons in Chemistry – Carlos Rafael Rivera (Apple TV+); Masters of the Air – Blake Neely (Apple TV+); Shōgun – Atticus Ross, Leopold Ross, and Nick Chuba (FX)
**Outstanding Music Supervision**: **Fallout: "The End" – Trygge Toven (Prime Video)**‡; Baby Reindeer: "Episode 4" – Catherine Grieves (Netflix); Fargo: "The Tragedy of the Commons" – Maggie Phillips (FX); Mr. & Mrs. Smith: "A Breakup" – Jen Malone (Prime Video); Only Murders in the Building: "Grab Your Hankies" – Bruce Gilbert and Lauren Marie Mikus (Hulu); True Detective: Night Country: "Part 4" – Susan Jacobs (HBO)

=== Picture Editing ===
**Outstanding Picture Editing for a Drama Series**: **Shōgun: "A Dream of a Dream" – Maria Gonzales and Aika Miyake (FX)**‡; Fallout: "The End" – Ali Comperchio (Prime Video); Fallout: "The Ghouls" – Yoni Reiss (Prime Video); Mr. & Mrs. Smith: "First Date" – Kyle Reiter and Isaac Hagy (Prime Video); Slow Horses: "Footprints" – Zsófia Tálas (Apple TV+); 3 Body Problem: "Judgment Day" – Michael Ruscio (Netflix)	**Outstanding Picture Editing for a Multi-Camera Comedy Series**: **How I Met Your Father: "Okay Fine, It's a Hurricane" – Russell Griffin (Hulu)**‡; Frasier: "Blind Date" – Joseph Fulton (Paramount+); Night Court: "Wheelers of Fortune" – Stephen Prime (NBC); The Upshaws: "Ain't Broke" – Angel Gamboa Bryant and Brian LeCoz (Netflix); The Upshaws: "Auto Motives" – Angel Gamboa Bryant (Netflix)
**Outstanding Picture Editing for a Single-Camera Comedy Series**: **The Bear: "Fishes" – Joanna Naugle (FX)**‡; Hacks: "The Deborah Vance Christmas Spectacular" – Jess Brunetto (Max); Only Murders in the Building: "Sitzprobe" – Shelly Westerman and Payton Koch (Hulu); Only Murders in the Building: "The White Room" – Peggy Tachdjian (Hulu); Reservation Dogs: "Dig" – Patrick Tuck and Varun Viswanath (FX); What We Do in the Shadows: "Pride Parade" – Liza Cardinale and A.J. Dickerson (FX)	**Outstanding Picture Editing for a Limited or Anthology Series or Movie**: **Baby Reindeer: "Episode 4" – Peter H. Oliver and Benjamin Gerstein (Netflix)**‡; Black Mirror: "Beyond the Sea" – Jon Harris (Netflix); Fargo: "The Tragedy of the Commons" – Regis Kimble (FX); Ripley: "III Sommerso" – Joshua Raymond Lee and David O. Rogers (Netflix); True Detective: Night Country: "Part 4" – Matt Chessé (HBO); True Detective: Night Country: "Part 6" – Brenna Rangott (HBO)
**Outstanding Picture Editing for Variety Programming**: **John Mulaney Presents: Everybody's in LA: "Paranormal" – Kelly Lyon, Sean McIlraith, and Ryan McIlraith (Netflix)**‡; Dolly Parton's Pet Gala – Bill DeRonde, James Collet, Kari Heavenrich, and Stavros Stavropoulos (CBS); Nikki Glaser: Someday You'll Die – Guy Harding (HBO); Ramy Youssef: More Feelings – Joanna Naugle (HBO); Tig Notaro: Hello Again – Kelly Lyon (Prime Video)	**Outstanding Picture Editing for Variety Programming (Segment)**: **The Daily Show: "The Dailyshowography of Vivek Ramaswamy: Enter the RamaVerse" – Catherine Trasborg (Comedy Central)**‡; Last Week Tonight with John Oliver: "Boeing" – Anthony Miale (HBO); Last Week Tonight with John Oliver: "The Sad Tale of Henry the Engine" – Ryan Barger (HBO); Saturday Night Live: "Bowen's Straight" – Paul Del Gesso and Kristie Ferriso (NBC); Saturday Night Live: "I'm Just Pete" – Ryan Spears (NBC)
**Outstanding Picture Editing for a Nonfiction Program**: **Jim Henson Idea Man – Sierra Neal and Paul Crowder (Disney+)**‡; Albert Brooks: Defending My Life – Bob Joyce (HBO); Beckham: "Golden Balls" – Michael Harte, Paul Carlin, and Chris King (Netflix); Escaping Twin Flames: "Up in Flames" – Martin Biehn, Kevin Hibbard, Troy Takaki, Mimi Wilcox, and Inbal B. Lessner (Netflix); The Jinx — Part Two: "Chapter 9: Saving My Tears Until It's Official" – Richard Hankin, Charles Olivier, Lance Edmands, Sam Neave, Camilla Hayman, and David Tillman (HBO); Quiet on Set: The Dark Side of Kids TV: "Hidden in Plain Sight" – Daphne Gómez-Mena, Jane Jo, and Cody Rogowski (Investigation Discovery); Steve! (Martin) A Documentary in 2 Pieces: "Then" – Alan Lowe (Apple TV+)	**Outstanding Picture Editing for a Structured Reality or Competition Program**: **The Voice – Sean Basaman, John M. Larson, Robert M. Malachowski Jr., Matt Antell, John Baldino, Matthew Blair, Melissa Silva Borden, William Fabian Castro, Andrew Ciancia, Nicholas Don Vito, Glen Ebesu, Rick Enrique, Greg Fitzsimmons, Brian Freundlich, Noel A. Guerra, Alyssa Dressman Lehner, John Homesley, Omega Hsu, Niki Hunter, Ryan P. James, Lise Kearney, Terri Maloney, James J. Munoz, Barry Murphy, Rich Remis, Robby Thompson, Matt Wafaie, and Eric Wise (NBC)**‡; The Amazing Race – Eric Beetner, Kevin Blum, Kellen Cruden, Christina Fontana, Jay Gammill, Katherine Griffin, Jason Groothuis, Darrick Lazo, Ryan Leamy, Josh Lowry, Steven Mellon, Paul C. Nielsen, Myron Santos, and Steven Urrutia (CBS); Queer Eye: "Kiss the Sky" – Toni Ann Carabello, Enrique Araujo, Widgie Nikia Figaro, Jason Szabo, and Kimberly Pellnat (Netflix); RuPaul's Drag Race: "Werq the World" – Jamie Martin, Paul Cross, Ryan Mallick, and Michael Roha (MTV); Top Chef – Steve Lichtenstein, Ericka Concha, George Dybas, Malia Jurick, Brian Kane, Chris King, Eric Lambert, Joon Hee Lim, Matt Reynolds, Jay M. Rogers, Daniel Ruiz, Reggie Spangler, and Annie Tighe (Bravo)
**Outstanding Picture Editing for an Unstructured Reality Program**: **Welcome to Wrexham: "Up the Town?" – Michael Brown, Josh Drisko, Michael Oliver, Bryan Rowland, and Steve Welch (FX)**‡; Below Deck Down Under: "The Turnover Day" – Garrett Hohendorf and Addison McCoubrey (Bravo); Deadliest Catch: "Nautical Deathtrap" – Rob Butler, Isaiah Camp, Josh Stockero, Alexander Rubinow, Chris Courtner, Chris Meyers, and Alberto Perez (Discovery Channel); Love on the Spectrum U.S.: "Episode 7" – Rachel Grierson-Johns, Leanne Cole, Toby Stratmann, and Gretchen Peterson (Netflix); RuPaul's Drag Race: Untucked: "Rate-A-Queen" – Matthew D. Miller and Kellen Cruden (MTV)

=== Sound Editing ===
**Outstanding Sound Editing for a Comedy or Drama Series (One Hour)**: **Shōgun: "Broken to the Fist" – Brian J Armstrong, Benjamin Cook, James Gallivan, John Creed, Ayako Yamauchi, Mark Hailstone, Ken Cain, Melissa Muik, Matt Salib, and Sanaa Kelley (FX)**‡; Avatar: The Last Airbender: "Legends" – Tim Kimmel, Luke Gibleon, John Matter, Bradley C. Katona, Justin Helle, Micha Liberman, Stefan Fraticelli, Jason Charbonneau, and William Kellerman (Netflix); Fallout: "The Target" – Sue Gamsaragan Cahill, Daniel Colman, Joseph Fraioli, Jane Boegel-Koch, Sara Bencivenga, Jonathan Golodner, Karen Triest, Randall Guth, Christopher Kaller, Clint Bennet, Nancy Parker, and Katie Rose (Prime Video); Star Trek: Strange New Worlds: "Hegemony" – Matthew E. Taylor, Michael Schapiro, Sean Heissinger, Kip Smedley, Ian Herzon, Deron Street, Clay Weber, John Sanacore, Rick Owens, and Jesi Ruppel (Paramount+); 3 Body Problem: "Judgment Day" – Tim Kimmel, Paula Fairfield, John Matter, Tim Hands, Bradley C. Katona, Justin Helle, David Klotz, Stefan Fraticelli, Jason Charbonneau, and William Kellerman (Netflix)	**Outstanding Sound Editing for a Comedy or Drama Series (Half-Hour) and Animation**: **The Bear: "Forks" – Steve "Major" Giammaria, Andrea Bella, Evan Benjamin, Jonathan Fuhrer, Annie Taylor, Jason Lingle, Jeff Lingle, Leslie Bloome, and Shaun Brennan (FX)**‡; Ahsoka: "Part Four: Fallen Jedi" – Matthew Wood, Bonnie Wild, David Acord, James Spencer, Vanessa Lapato, Stephanie McNally, Trey Turner, Kimberly Patrick, Tim Farrell, Joel Raabe, Chris Tergesen, Ronni Brown, Heikki Kossi, and Shelley Roden (Disney+); Blue Eye Samurai: "All Evil Dreams and Angry Words" – Myron Nettinga, Paulette Lifton, Sam Hayward, Jared Dwyer, Andrew Miller, Johanna Turner, Justin Helle, Iko Kagasoff, Stefan Fraticelli, and Jason Charbonneau (Netflix); Only Murders in the Building: "Sitzprobe" – Mathew Waters, Danika Wikke, Taylor Jackson, Meredith Stacy, Erika Koski, Micha Liberman, Sanaa Kelley, and Iris Dutour (Hulu); Star Trek: Lower Decks: "The Inner Fight" – James Lucero, Drew Guy, Mak Kellerman, John Wynn, and Michael Britt (Paramount+)
**Outstanding Sound Editing for a Limited or Anthology Series, Movie or Special**: **Ripley: "III Sommerso" – Larry Zipf, Michael Feuser, Michael McMenomy, Lidia Tamplenizza, David Forshee, Bill R. Dean, Wyatt Sprague, Angelo Palazzo, Matt Haasch, Igor Nikolic, Dan Evans Farkas, Ben Schor, Jay Peck, and Sandra Fox (Netflix)**‡; All the Light We Cannot See: "Episode 4" – Craig Henighan, Ryan Cole, Emma Present, Jill Purdy, David Grimaldi, Matt Cloud, Gina Wark, Dan DiPrima, Steve Durkee, and Steve Baine (Netflix); Fargo: "The Tragedy of the Commons" – Nick Forshager, Joe Bracciale, Dustin Harris, Alex Bullick, Brad Bakelmun, Ben Schor, Jason Charbonneau, and Stefan Fraticelli (FX); Masters of the Air: "Part Five" – Jack Whittaker, Michael Minkler, Jeff Sawyer, Luke Gibleon, Dave McMoyler, Michael Hertlein, Michele Perrone, Jim Brookshire, Bryan Parker, Zach Goheen, Paul B. Knox, Adam Kopald, Angela Claverie, Dylan Tuomy-Wilhoit, and Jeff Wilhoit (Apple TV+); True Detective: Night Country: "Part 6" – Martin Hernández, Stephen Griffiths, Tom Jenkins, Michele Woods, Andy Shelley, Jake Fielding, Stuart Bagshaw, Barnaby Smyth, Rebecca Glover, and Ben Smithers (HBO)	**Outstanding Sound Editing for a Nonfiction or Reality Program**: **Jim Henson Idea Man – Daniel Timmons, Jeremy S. Bloom, Ian Cymore, and Ryan Rubin (Disney+)**‡; The Greatest Night in Pop – Richard Gallagher (Netflix); Planet Earth III: "Freshwater" – Jonny Crew, Tim Owens, Ellie Bowler, and Paul Ackerman (BBC America); Steve! (Martin) A Documentary in 2 Pieces – Bob Edwards, Kim B. Christensen, and Joel Raabe (Apple TV+); Welcome to Wrexham: "Goals" – Shaun Cromwell, William Harp, Jon Schell, and Sean Gray (FX)

=== Sound Mixing ===
**Outstanding Sound Mixing for a Comedy or Drama Series (One Hour)**: **Shōgun: "Broken to the Fist" – Steve Pederson, Greg P. Russell, Michael Williamson, Takashi Akaku, and Arno Stephanian (FX)**‡; The Crown: "Sleep, Dearie Sleep" – Lee Walpole, Martin Jensen, Stuart Hilliker, and Chris Ashworth (Netflix); Fallout: "The Target" – Keith Rogers, Steve Bucino, and Tod A. Maitland (Prime Video); Loki: "Glorious Purpose" – Karol Urban and Paul Munro (Disney+); 3 Body Problem: "Judgment Day" – Marc Fishman, Danielle Dupre, and Richard Dyer (Netflix)	**Outstanding Sound Mixing for a Limited or Anthology Series or Movie**: **Masters of the Air: "Part Five" – Michael Minkler, Duncan McRae, Tim Fraser, and Thor Fienberg (Apple TV+)**‡; Black Mirror: "Beyond the Sea" – James Ridgway, Richard Miller, Adam Méndez, and Daniel Kresco (Netflix); Fargo: "The Tragedy of the Commons" – Martin Lee, Kirk Lynds, Michael Playfair, and Michael Perfitt (FX); Ripley: "VII Macabre Entertainment" – Michael Barry, Larry Zipf, Maurizio Argentieri, and Michael Perfitt (Netflix); True Detective: Night Country: "Part 6" – Howard Bargroff, Mark Timms, Skúli Helgi Sigurgíslason, and Keith Partridge (HBO)
**Outstanding Sound Mixing for a Comedy or Drama Series (Half-Hour) and Animation (Area)**: **The Bear: "Forks" – Steve "Major" Giammaria, Scott D. Smith, Patrick Christensen, and Ryan Collison (FX)**‡; Curb Your Enthusiasm: "Ken/Kendra" – Earl Martin, Chuck Buch, Trino Madriz, and Sam C. Lewis (HBO); Hacks: "Just for Laughs" – John W. Cook II, Ben Wilkins, and Jim Lakin (Max); Only Murders in the Building: "Sitzprobe" – Mathew Waters, Lindsey Alvarez, Joseph White Jr., Alan DeMoss, and Derik Lee (Hulu); What We Do in the Shadows: "Local News" – Diego Gat, Samuel Ejnes, and Rob Beal (FX)	**Outstanding Sound Mixing for a Variety Series or Special**: **Billy Joel: The 100th — Live at Madison Square Garden – Brian Riordan, Phil DeTolve, Peter Gary, Brian Flanzbaum, Josh Weibel, and Brian Ruggles (CBS)**‡; 66th Grammy Awards – Thomas Holmes, John Harris, Eric Schilling, Jeff Peterson, Jaime Pollock, Michael Parker, Andres Arango, Juan Pablo Velasco, Aaron Walk, Eric Johnston, Christian Schrader, and Kristian Pedregon (CBS); The Oscars – Paul Sandweiss, Tommy Vicari, Biff Dawes, Pablo Munguia, Kristian Pedregon, Patrick Baltzell, Michael Parker, Christian Schrader, John Perez, Tom Pesa, and Steve Genewick (ABC); 2023 Rock and Roll Hall of Fame Induction Ceremony – Al Centrella, Bob Clearmountain, John Harris, Dan Gerhard, Robert Scovilm, Mike Bove, and Simon Welsh (ABC); Saturday Night Live: "Host: Kristen Wiig" – Robert Palladino, Ezra Matychak, Frank Duca, Christopher Costello, Josiah Gluck, Jay Vicari, Lawrence Manchester, Tyler McDiarmid, Caroline Sanchez, Geoff Countryman, Teng Chen, and Devin Emke (NBC)
**Outstanding Sound Mixing for a Nonfiction Program**: **The Beach Boys – Gary A. Rizzo, John Rampey, Sabi Tulok, and Dennis Hamlin (Disney+)**‡; Jim Henson Idea Man – Tony Volante and Michael Jones (Disney+); Planet Earth III: "Deserts and Grasslands" – Graham Wild, Oliver Baldwin, and Olga Reed (BBC America); Stax: Soulsville U.S.A.: "Chapter Two: Soul Man" – Tony Volante and Andre Artis (HBO); Steve! (Martin) A Documentary in 2 Pieces – Pete Horner, Dennis Hamlin, Barry London, and Emily Strong (Apple TV+)	**Outstanding Sound Mixing for a Reality Program**: **Welcome to Wrexham: "Giant Killers" – Mark Jensen (FX)**‡; The Amazing Race – Troy Smith, Jim Ursulak, Jim Blank, Emerson Boergadine, Paul Bruno, John Buchanan, Jerry Chabane, Alfredo R. Del Portillo, Freddie DiPasquale, Dean Gaveau, Ryan P. Kelly, Richard Chardy Lopez, Mickey McMullen, Sean Milburn, Simon Paine, John A. Pitron, Jody Stillwater, and Jeff Zipp (CBS); Deadliest Catch: "Nautical Deathtrap" – Jared Robbins (Discovery Channel); RuPaul's Drag Race – Sal Ojeda, Erik Valenzuela, Ryan Brady, David Nolte, and Andrew Papastephanou (MTV); The Voice: "Live Finale" – Michael Abbott, Kenyata Westbrook, Randy Faustino, Christian Schrader, Carlos A. Torres, Andrew Fletcher, Shaun Sebastian, Tim Hatayama, Adrian Ordonez, Barry Weir Jr., and Ryan Young (NBC)

=== Special Visual Effects ===
**Outstanding Special Visual Effects in a Season or a Movie**: **Shōgun – Michael Cliett, Melody Mead, Jed Glassford, Cameron Waldbauer, Philip Engström, Chelsea Mirus, Ed Bruce, Nicholas Murphy, and Kyle Rottman (FX)**‡; Ahsoka – Richard Bluff, Jakris Smittant, Paul Kavanagh, TC Harrison, Scott Fisher, Enrico Damm, Justin van der Lek, Rick O'Connor, and J. Alan Scott (Disney+); Avatar: The Last Airbender – Marion Spates, Jabbar Raisani, Adam Chazen, Niklas Jacobson, Nick Crew, Emanuel Fuchs, Khalid Almeerani, Ross Wilkinson, and Thomas Schelesny (Netflix); Fallout – Jay Worth, Andrea Knoll, Grant Everett, Jill Paget, Jacqueline VandenBussche, Devin Maggio, Andreas Giesen, Ahmed Gharraph, and Joao Sita (Prime Video); Loki – Christopher Townsend, Allison Paul, Sandra Balej, Matthew Twyford, Christopher Smallfield, John William Van der pool, Steve Moncur, Julian Hutchens, and Kevin Yuille (Disney+)	**Outstanding Special Visual Effects in a Single Episode (Area)**: **Ripley: "III Sommerso" – John Bowers, Jason Tsang, Joseph Servodio, Maricel Pagulayan, Christopher White, Libby Hazell, Francois Sugny, Gaia Bussolati, and Pepe Valencia (Netflix)**‡; All the Light We Cannot See: "Episode 4" – Charlie Lehmer, Swen Gillberg, Viet Luu, Tessa Roehl, Paolo Acri, Harry Bardak, Sylvain Theroux, John Britto, and Laurence Berkani (Netflix); The Crown: "Dis-Moi Oui" – Ben Turner, Reece Ewing, Oliver Bersey, Julia Stannard, Joe Cork, Tim Zaccheo, Aurélien Ronceray, Joseph Dymond, and Elena Pagliei (Netflix); True Detective: Night Country: "Part 1" – Barney Curnow, Jan Guilfoyle, Eggert "Eddi" Ketilsson, Simon Stanley-Clamp, Manuel Reyes Halaby, Tiago Faria, Panos Theodoropoulos, Cale Pugh, and Tim Zaccheo (HBO); Winning Time: The Rise of the Lakers Dynasty: "Beat L.A." – Raymond McIntyre Jr., Victor DiMichina, Damien Stantina, and Javier Menéndez Platas (HBO)

=== Stunts ===
**Outstanding Stunt Coordination for Comedy Programming**: **The Gentlemen – Mark Mottram (Netflix)**‡; The Brothers Sun – Justin Yu (Netflix); The Righteous Gemstones – Cory DeMeyers (HBO); Twisted Metal – Clay Cullen (Peacock); What We Do in the Shadows – Tig Fong and JF Lachapelle (FX)	**Outstanding Stunt Coordination for Drama Programming**: **Mr. & Mrs. Smith – Stephen Pope (Prime Video)**‡; Fallout – Casey O'Neill (Prime Video); FBI: Most Wanted – Declan Mulvey (CBS); The Rookie – David Scott Rowden Sr. (ABC); Warrior – Brett Chan and Johnny Yang (Max)
**Outstanding Stunt Performance**: **Shōgun: "The Eightfold Fence" – Hiroo Minami, Nobuyuki Obikane, Martin Cochingco, and Johnson Phan (FX)**‡; The Continental: From the World of John Wick: "Theatre of Pain" – Jay Hawkins, Jerry Quill, and Ivy Haralson (Peacock); Fallout: "The Target" – Justice Hedenberg, Hannah Scott, Adam Shippey, and Noelle Mulligan (Prime Video); Mr. & Mrs. Smith: "A Breakup" – Tara Macken (Prime Video); The Righteous Gemstones: "Burn for Burn, Wound for Wound, Stripe for Stripe" – Ryan Disharoon, Mike Endoso, Jett Jansen Fernandez, and Rich King (HBO)

=== Technical Direction ===
**Outstanding Technical Direction and Camerawork for a Series**: **Saturday Night Live: "Host: Timothée Chalamet" – Bill DiGiovanni, John Pinto, Paul Cangialosi, Anthony Tarantino, Dave Driscoll, Brian Phraner, and Daniel Erbeck (NBC)**‡; America's Got Talent: "Finale Performances" – Allan Wells, Zach Greenberg, Kary D'Alessandro, John Gardner, Helena Jackson, Mark Koonce, Ron Lehman, Dave Levisohn, Adam Margolis, David Plakos, Brian Reason, Dann Webb, and Easter Xua (NBC); Dancing with the Stars: "Finale" – Charles Ciup, Dave Bernstein, Bert Atkinson, Jonas Brueling, Mike Carr, Jimmy Garcia, Bruce Green, Nathanial Havholm, Ron Lehman, Bettina Levesque, Adam Margolis, Rob Palmer, Derek Pratt, Brian Reason, Jofre Rosero, Daniel Schade, Daryl Studebaker, Cary Symmons, and Easter Xua (ABC); Last Week Tonight with John Oliver: "Elon Musk" – Dave Saretsky, Jerry Canćel, Franco Coello, Dante Pagano, Mark Britt, and Joe DeBonis (HBO); The Late Show with Stephen Colbert: "April 8, 2024: Strange Eclipse Behavior, NYC's Earthquake, Mt. Etna Blows Smoke Rings, Trump's $50m Fundraiser; Meanwhile; Rep. Alexandria Ocasio-Cortez; Tyla" – Karen Obel Cape, Roberto Lopez, Brian V. Cimino, Joe DeBonis, John Hannel, John Harrison, Wade Latz, and Dante Pagano (CBS)	**Outstanding Technical Direction and Camerawork for a Special**: **Billy Joel: The 100th — Live at Madison Square Garden – Jon Pretnar, Rob Balton, Mark Britt, Bobby Del Russo, Daniel Erbeck, Nick Fayo, Pete Forrest, Jonny Harkins, Shaun Harkins, Ray Hoover, John Kosmochewski, Jay Kulick, Kevin Murphy, Lyn Noland, Jimmy O'Donnell, Chris Piazza, Mark Renaudin, Ed Staebler, Mark Whitman, Rich York, Jeff Siegel, Brett Turnbull, J.M. Hurley, and Michael Maiatico (CBS)**‡; The Apple Music Super Bowl LVIII Halftime Show Starring Usher – Eric Becker, Rod Wardell, Rob Balton, Danny Bonilla, Kary D'Alessandro, Suzanne Ebner, Sean Flannery, Kevin French, Helena Jackson, Tore Livia, Adam Margolis, Allen Merriweather, Jofre Rosero, Keyan Safyari, J.M. Hurley, Matt Conrad, and Terrance Ho (CBS); The Daily Show Presents: Jordan Klepper Fingers the Pulse — Moscow Tools – Bernardo Garcia, Al Johnson, Andrew Maso, Patrick O'Donnel, Joel Sadler, Bart Sienkiewicz, and Jim Wells (Comedy Central); 66th Grammy Awards – Eric Becker, Rod Wardell, Danny Bonilla, Mike Carr, Suzanne Ebner, Sean Flannery, Helena Jackson, Ron Lehman, Tore Livia, Adam Margolis, Allen Merriweather, Rob Palmer, David Plakos, Brian Reason, Jofre Rosero, Keyan Safyari, Easter Xua, Daniel Schade, Ryan Campbell, Scott Hazel, Peter Drinco, and Greg Hoffman (CBS); Hannah Waddingham: Home for Christmas – Chuck Crampton, Lincoln Abraham, Charlie Bryan, Mark Cruickshank, Paul Davis, Alex Dodd, Curtis Dunne, Guiseppe Ingrao, Lewis Mutongwizo, Andre Seraille, Jeremy Mackie, Joseph Hallgate, Jon Kassell, and Simon Wood (Apple TV+)

=== Writing ===
**Outstanding Writing for a Variety Series**: **Last Week Tonight with John Oliver – Daniel O'Brien, Owen Parsons, Charlie Redd, Joanna Rothkopf, Seena Vali, Johnathan Appel, Ali Barthwell, Tim Carvell, Liz Hynes, Ryan Ken, Mark Kramer, Sofía Manfredi, John Oliver, Taylor Kay Phillips, and Chrissy Shackelford (HBO)**‡; The Daily Show – Dan Amira, Lauren Sarver Means, Daniel Radosh, David Angelo, Nicole Conlan, Devin Delliquanti, Zach DiLanzo, Jen Flanz, Jason Gilbert, Dina Hashem, Scott Hercman, Josh Johnson, David Kibuuka, Matt Koff, Matt O'Brien, Joseph Opio, Randall Otis, Zhubin Parang, Kat Radley, Lanee' Sanders, Scott Sherman, Jon Stewart, Ashton Womack, and Sophie Zucker (Comedy Central); Saturday Night Live – Kent Sublette, Streeter Seidell, Alison Gates, Gary Richardson, Will Stephen, Celeste Yim, Bryan Tucker, Rosebud Baker, Dan Bulla, Steven Castillo, Michael Che, Mike DiCenzo, Alex English, Jimmy Fowlie, Martin Herlihy, John Higgins, Steve Higgins, Vannessa Jackson, Colin Jost, Erik Kenward, Ben Marshall, Dave McCary, Lorne Michaels, Jake Nordwind, Ceara O'Sullivan, Ben Silva, Julio Torres, Asha Ward, Auguste White, Pete Schultz, Megan Callahan-Shah, Dennis McNicholas, Josh Patten, and KC Shornima (NBC)	**Outstanding Writing for a Nonfiction Program**: **Conan O'Brien Must Go: "Ireland" – Jessie Gaskell, Conan O'Brien, Matt O'Brien, and Mike Sweeney (Max)**‡; How To with John Wilson: "How To Watch the Game" – John Wilson, Michael Koman, and Allie Viti (HBO); Jim Henson Idea Man – Mark Monroe (Disney+); The Jinx — Part Two: "Chapter 7: Why Are You Still Here?" – Andrew Jarecki, Sam Neave, and Zac Stuart-Pontier (HBO); The Reluctant Traveler with Eugene Levy: "Scotland: My Mother's Country" – Alan Connor, David Reilly, and Christine Rose (Apple TV+)

=== Nominations and wins by program ===
For the purposes of the lists below, any wins in juried categories are assumed to have a prior nomination.

Programs with multiple Creative Arts nominations
Nominations	Show	Network
17	Shōgun	FX
15	Only Murders in the Building	Hulu
15	Saturday Night Live	NBC
14	The Bear	FX
13	Fallout	Prime Video
13	True Detective: Night Country	HBO
11	Mr. & Mrs. Smith	Prime Video
10	The Crown	Netflix
10	Hacks	Max
9	Fargo	FX
9	Jim Henson Idea Man	Disney+
8	Palm Royale	Apple TV+
8	Ripley	Netflix
7	The Oscars	ABC
7	RuPaul's Drag Race	MTV
6	Welcome to Wrexham	FX
5	Ahsoka	Disney+
5	Beckham	Netflix
5	Blue Eye Samurai	Netflix
5	Dancing with the Stars	ABC
5	Feud: Capote vs. The Swans	FX
5	66th Grammy Awards	CBS
5	Lessons in Chemistry	Apple TV+
5	The Morning Show	Apple TV+
5	Planet Earth III	BBC America
5	Steve! (Martin) A Documentary in 2 Pieces	Apple TV+
5	3 Body Problem	Netflix
5	76th Annual Tony Awards	CBS
5	What We Do in the Shadows	FX
4	Albert Brooks: Defending My Life	HBO
4	All the Light We Cannot See	Netflix
4	The Amazing Race	CBS
4	Baby Reindeer	Netflix
4	Billy Joel: The 100th — Live at Madison Square Garden	CBS
4	Dick Van Dyke 98 Years of Magic	CBS
4	Last Week Tonight with John Oliver	HBO
4	The Late Show with Stephen Colbert	CBS
4	Love on the Spectrum U.S.	Netflix
4	Slow Horses	Apple TV+
4	The Voice	NBC
4	Winning Time: The Rise of the Lakers Dynasty	HBO
3	The Apple Music Super Bowl LVIII Halftime Show Starring Usher	CBS
3	The Daily Show	Comedy Central
3	Frasier	Paramount+
3	The Gilded Age	HBO
3	Girls State	Apple TV+
3	The Greatest Night in Pop	Netflix
3	The Jinx — Part Two	HBO
3	Loki	Disney+
3	Masters of the Air	Apple TV+
3	The Righteous Gemstones	HBO
3	2023 Rock and Roll Hall of Fame Induction Ceremony	ABC
3	Squid Game: The Challenge	Netflix
3	The Traitors	Peacock
3	The Upshaws	Netflix
2	Abbott Elementary	ABC
2	America's Got Talent	NBC
2	Avatar: The Last Airbender	Netflix
2	Below Deck Down Under	Bravo
2	Black Mirror	Netflix
2	The Boulet Brothers' Dragula	Shudder
2	Celebrity Family Feud	ABC
2	Conan O'Brien Must Go	Max
2	Curb Your Enthusiasm	HBO
2	Dave Chappelle: The Dreamer	Netflix
2	Deadliest Catch	Discovery Channel
2	The Eric Andre Show	Adult Swim
2	The Gentlemen	Netflix
2	Griselda	Netflix
2	Hannah Waddingham: Home for Christmas	Apple TV+
2	How I Met Your Father	Hulu
2	How To with John Wilson	HBO
2	Jeopardy!	ABC / Syndicated
2	Night Court	NBC
2	Nikki Glaser: Someday You'll Die	HBO
2	Password	NBC
2	Physical	Apple TV+
2	Queer Eye	Netflix
2	Quiet on Set: The Dark Side of Kids TV	Investigation Discovery
2	The Reluctant Traveler with Eugene Levy	Apple TV+
2	Reservation Dogs	FX
2	RuPaul's Drag Race: Untucked	MTV
2	Scavengers Reign	Max
2	Shark Tank	ABC
2	Silo	Apple TV+
2	The Simpsons	Fox
2	Stax: Soulsville U.S.A.	HBO
2	Survivor	CBS
2	The Tattooist of Auschwitz	Peacock
2	Taylor Mac's 24-Decade History of Popular Music	HBO
2	Tig Notaro: Hello Again	Prime Video
2	Top Chef	Bravo
2	Trevor Noah: Where Was I	Netflix
2	We're Here	HBO
2	Wheel of Fortune	ABC / Syndicated

Programs with multiple Creative Arts wins
Wins	Show	Network
14	Shōgun	FX
7	The Bear	FX
6	Saturday Night Live	NBC
5	Jim Henson Idea Man	Disney+
4	Blue Eye Samurai	Netflix
4	The Oscars	ABC
3	Billy Joel: The 100th — Live at Madison Square Garden	CBS
3	Only Murders in the Building	Hulu
3	Ripley	Netflix
3	Welcome to Wrexham	FX
2	Baby Reindeer	Netflix
2	The Crown	Netflix
2	Girls State	Apple TV+
2	How I Met Your Father	Hulu
2	Love on the Spectrum U.S.	Netflix
2	The Morning Show	Apple TV+
2	Mr. & Mrs. Smith	Prime Video

=== Nominations and wins by network ===
Networks with multiple Creative Arts nominations
Nominations	Network
83	Netflix
72	HBO / Max
60	FX
44	Apple TV+
36	CBS
30	ABC
29	Prime Video
28	NBC
20	Disney+
19	Hulu
9	MTV
9	Peacock
6	Fox
6	Paramount+
5	BBC America
5	Bravo
4	Syndicated
3	Comedy Central
3	Investigation Discovery
3	Meta
3	Nat Geo
3	PBS
2	Adult Swim
2	Discovery Channel
2	Shudder
2	YouTube

Networks with multiple Creative Arts wins
Wins	Network
27	FX
18	Netflix
8	HBO / Max
7	ABC
7	Apple TV+
7	Disney+
7	Hulu
7	NBC
5	CBS
4	Prime Video
2	Nat Geo
2	Peacock
2	Syndication

== Ceremony order and presenters ==
The following categories were presented at each ceremony:

Presenters on Saturday, September 7
Category	Presenter(s)
Outstanding Short Form Nonfiction or Reality Series	Hannah Waddingham
Outstanding Short Form Comedy, Drama or Variety Series	Hannah Waddingham
Outstanding Game Show	Masi Oka
Outstanding Host for a Game Show	Masi Oka
Outstanding Commercial	Masi Oka
Outstanding Character Voice-Over Performance	Nikki Glaser
Outstanding Animated Program	Nikki Glaser
Outstanding Individual Achievement in Animation	Nikki Glaser
Outstanding Production Design for a Variety or Reality Series	Derek Hough
Outstanding Production Design for a Variety Special	Derek Hough
Outstanding Choreography for Variety or Reality Programming	Derek Hough
Outstanding Hairstyling for a Variety, Nonfiction or Reality Program	Barbara Corcoran Mark Cuban Lori Greiner Robert Herjavec Daymond John Kevin O'Leary
Outstanding Makeup for a Variety, Nonfiction or Reality Program	Barbara Corcoran Mark Cuban Lori Greiner Robert Herjavec Daymond John Kevin O'Leary
Outstanding Casting for a Reality Program	Barbara Corcoran Mark Cuban Lori Greiner Robert Herjavec Daymond John Kevin O'Leary
Outstanding Cinematography for a Nonfiction Program	Phil Keoghan
Outstanding Cinematography for a Reality Program	Phil Keoghan
Outstanding Costumes for a Variety, Nonfiction, or Reality Programming	Phil Keoghan
Outstanding Writing for a Variety Series	Jane Lynch
Outstanding Writing for a Nonfiction Programming	Jane Lynch
Outstanding Emerging Media Program	Tig Notaro
Outstanding Innovation in Emerging Media Programming	Tig Notaro
Outstanding Sound Editing for a Nonfiction or Reality Program	Maksim Chmerkovskiy Victor Montalvo
Outstanding Music Composition for a Documentary Series or Special (Original Dramatic Score)	Maksim Chmerkovskiy Victor Montalvo
Outstanding Music Direction	Maksim Chmerkovskiy Victor Montalvo
Outstanding Sound Mixing for a Reality Program	Jonathan Bennett Melissa Peterman
Sound Mixing for a Nonfiction Program	Jonathan Bennett Melissa Peterman
Outstanding Sound Mixing for a Variety Series or Special	Jonathan Bennett Melissa Peterman
Outstanding Picture Editing for a Nonfiction Program	Kristen Kish
Outstanding Picture Editing for Variety Programming	Kristen Kish
Outstanding Picture Editing for Variety Programming (Segment)	Kristen Kish
Outstanding Picture Editing for an Unstructured Reality Program	Ariana Madix Katie Maloney
Outstanding Picture Editing for a Structured Reality or Competition Program	Ariana Madix Katie Maloney
In Memoriam segment	Not applicable
Outstanding Narrator	Matt Friend
Outstanding Documentary or Nonfiction Series	Matt Friend
Outstanding Documentary or Nonfiction Special	Matt Friend
Outstanding Structured Reality Program	Lucy Liu
Outstanding Unstructured Reality Program	Lucy Liu
Exceptional Merit in Documentary Filmmaking	Lucy Liu
Outstanding Host for a Reality or Reality Competition Program	LeVar Burton
Outstanding Hosted Nonfiction Series or Special	LeVar Burton
Outstanding Directing for a Documentary/Nonfiction Program	LeVar Burton
Outstanding Lighting Design / Lighting Direction for a Variety Series	Dani Bowman David Isaacman Abbey Romero
Outstanding Lighting Design / Lighting Direction for a Variety Special	Dani Bowman David Isaacman Abbey Romero
Outstanding Technical Direction and Camerawork for a Series	Mike Birbiglia
Outstanding Technical Direction and Camerawork for a Special	Mike Birbiglia
Outstanding Directing for a Reality Program	Mike Birbiglia
Outstanding Directing for a Variety Special	Fisher Stevens
Outstanding Directing for a Variety Series	Fisher Stevens
Outstanding Variety Special (Pre-Recorded)	Garcelle Beauvais
Outstanding Variety Special (Live)	Garcelle Beauvais

Presenters on Sunday, September 8
Category	Presenter(s)
Outstanding Guest Actor in a Drama Series	Jamie Lee Curtis
Outstanding Choreography for Scripted Programming	Jamie Lee Curtis
Outstanding Casting for a Limited or Anthology Series or Movie	Jimmy O. Yang
Outstanding Casting for a Comedy Series	Jimmy O. Yang
Outstanding Casting for a Drama Series	Jimmy O. Yang
Outstanding Fantasy/Sci-Fi Costumes	Devery Jacobs Sophie Skelton
Outstanding Period Costumes for a Limited or Anthology Series or Movie	Devery Jacobs Sophie Skelton
Outstanding Period Costumes for a Series	Devery Jacobs Sophie Skelton
Outstanding Contemporary Costumes for a Limited or Anthology Series or Movie	Yaya DaCosta Sagar Radia
Outstanding Contemporary Costumes for a Series	Yaya DaCosta Sagar Radia
Outstanding Period or Fantasy/Sci-Fi Makeup (Non-Prosthetic)	Alex Edelman
Outstanding Contemporary Makeup (Non-Prosthetic)	Alex Edelman
Outstanding Prosthetic Makeup	Alex Edelman
Primetime Emmy Award for Outstanding Contemporary Hairstyling	Nestor Carbonell
Outstanding Period or Fantasy/Sci-Fi Hairstyling	Nestor Carbonell
Outstanding Guest Actress in a Drama Series	Nestor Carbonell
Outstanding Stunt Performance	Austin Stowell Damon Wayans Jr.
Outstanding Stunt Coordination for Comedy Programming	Austin Stowell Damon Wayans Jr.
Outstanding Stunt Coordination for Drama Programming	Austin Stowell Damon Wayans Jr.
Outstanding Production Design for a Narrative Period or Fantasy Program (One Hour or More)	Wendi McLendon-Covey Allison Tolman
Outstanding Production Design for a Narrative Contemporary Program (One Hour or More)	Wendi McLendon-Covey Allison Tolman
Outstanding Production Design for a Narrative Program (Half-Hour)	Wendi McLendon-Covey Allison Tolman
Outstanding Picture Editing for a Multi-Camera Comedy Series	Michael Cyril Creighton Judy Reyes
Outstanding Picture Editing for a Single-Camera Comedy Series	Michael Cyril Creighton Judy Reyes
Outstanding Guest Actor in a Comedy Series	Michael Cyril Creighton Judy Reyes
Outstanding Guest Actress in a Comedy Series	Brie Larson Courtney McBroom
Outstanding Picture Editing for a Drama Series	Brie Larson Courtney McBroom
Outstanding Picture Editing for a Limited or Anthology Series or Movie	Brie Larson Courtney McBroom
Outstanding Special Visual Effects in a Single Episode	Desi Lydic
Outstanding Special Visual Effects in a Season or a Movie	Desi Lydic
Outstanding Main Title Design	Desi Lydic
Outstanding Motion Design	Desi Lydic
Outstanding Sound Editing for a Comedy or Drama Series (Half-Hour) and Animation	Adam Pally Luke Tennie
Outstanding Sound Editing for a Comedy or Drama Series (One Hour)	Adam Pally Luke Tennie
Outstanding Sound Editing for a Limited or Anthology Series, Movie or Special	Adam Pally Luke Tennie
In Memoriam segment	Not applicable
Outstanding Sound Mixing for a Comedy or Drama Series (Half-Hour) and Animation	Aria Mia Loberti
Outstanding Sound Mixing for a Comedy or Drama Series (One-Hour)	Aria Mia Loberti
Outstanding Sound Mixing for a Limited or Anthology Series or Movie	Aria Mia Loberti
Outstanding Performer in a Short Form Comedy or Drama Series	Parker Posey
Outstanding Music Composition for a Series (Original Dramatic Score)	Parker Posey
Outstanding Original Main Title Theme Music	Parker Posey
Outstanding Original Music and Lyrics	Phillipa Soo
Outstanding Music Supervision	Phillipa Soo
Outstanding Music Composition for a Limited or Anthology Series, Movie or Special (Original Dramatic Score)	Phillipa Soo
Outstanding Cinematography for a Multi-Camera Series (Half-Hour)	Giovanni Ribisi
Outstanding Cinematography for a Single-Camera Series (Half-Hour)	Giovanni Ribisi
Outstanding Cinematography for a Series (One Hour)	Giovanni Ribisi
Outstanding Cinematography for a Limited or Anthology Series or Movie	Giovanni Ribisi
Outstanding Television Movie	Patrick Brammall Harriet Dyer

== Ceremony information ==
The 76th Primetime Creative Arts Emmy Awards were executive produced by Bob Bain and directed by Richard Preuss. Nominations for the awards were unveiled on July 17. The winners were announced during two separate ceremonies at the Peacock Theater in Downtown Los Angeles held over two consecutive nights on September 7 and 8. The first night of awards focused on variety, non-fiction, and reality programming, while the second night focused on comedy, drama, and limited series programs. The combined ceremonies aired in an edited two-hour broadcast on September 14 on FXX. It was the second set of Primetime Creative Emmy Awards ceremonies held in 2024 due to the 75th ceremonies, originally slated to be held on September 9 and 10, 2023, taking place four months later on January 7 and 8, 2024, as a result of the 2023 Hollywood labor disputes.

=== Category changes ===
Notable changes for the Creative Arts categories this year included:

- Outstanding Short Form Animated Program was consolidated with Outstanding Animated Program with two tracks created: One for short form programs (between 2–20 minutes), and another for all other programming (over 20 minutes).
- Outstanding Actor in a Short Form Comedy or Drama Series and Outstanding Actress in a Short Form Comedy or Drama Series were merged to form Outstanding Performer in a Short Form Comedy or Drama Series
- In the guest performance categories, a guest performer was now defined as appearing in less than 50% of all eligible series episodes. To prevent cameos from being submitted for consideration, the Television Academy stated, "The minimum stand-alone and contiguous-screen time (performer has an ongoing engagement in the scene, on or off camera) for eligibility is 5% of the total running time of the submitted episode."
- For Outstanding Documentary or Nonfiction Series, Outstanding Documentary or Nonfiction Special, and Outstanding Hosted Nonfiction Series or Special, "line producer" became an Emmy-eligible credit.
- In the costume design categories, "Head of Workroom (aka Cutter/Fitter)" is now an Emmy-Eligible title. According to the rules stipulated by the Television Academy, "Their eligibility will be determined by the designer. Contribution to the project will be weighed on a percentage basis as is done for all other positions. Verification will be made by call sheet, deal memo and designer input. Those eligible must be individuals, rather than a costume house or facility. However, the head of a facility workroom may be considered."
- Outstanding Hairstyling for a Variety, Nonfiction or Reality Program and Outstanding Makeup for a Variety, Nonfiction or Reality Program, which were previously juried awards, were changed to have panels who pre-screened the submissions for nomination. The full peer group voted in the final round to determine the winners.

In addition, several categories were moved between the main and Creative Arts broadcasts. Outstanding Variety Special (Live) returned to the Creative Arts ceremonies, while Outstanding Writing for a Variety Special replaced Outstanding Writing for a Variety Series in the main broadcast.
