= DNF =

DNF may refer to:

== Computing and logic ==
- Dutch national flag problem, a computer science–related programming problem proposed by Edsger Dijkstra
- DNF (software), a package manager for RPM-based Linux distributions
- Disjunctive normal form, a standardization of a logical formula in boolean logic

== Other uses ==
- DNF (The Morning Show), an episode of the American television series The Morning Show
- Dungeon & Fighter, a video game series created by Neople
- Did not finish, a designation given in a race indicating that the competitor did not finish
- Duke Nukem Forever, a 2011 first-person shooter video game
- Dynamic apnea without fins, a discipline of competitive freediving.

== See also ==
- Do not Fragment (DF), a flag bit in IPv4 packets
