= The Stanford Student =

- The Morning Show episode
- Episode no.: Season 3 Episode 6
- Directed by: Mimi Leder
- Written by: Micah Schraft
- Cinematography by: John Grillo
- Editing by: Carola Kravetz Aykanian; Andrew Gust
- Original release date: October 11, 2023
- Running time: 55 minutes

Guest appearances
- Joe Tippett as Hal Jackson; Tig Notaro as Amanda Robinson; Hannah Leder as Isabella; Samantha Sloyan as Cheryl; Shari Belafonte as Julia; Tara Karsian as Gayle Berman; Andrea Bendewald as Valérie; Choni Francis as RJ Smith

Episode chronology
← Previous "Love Island"	Next → "Strict Scrutiny"

"The Stanford Student" is the sixth episode of the third season of the American drama television series The Morning Show, inspired by Brian Stelter's 2013 book Top of the Morning. It is the 26th overall episode of the series and was written by consulting producer Micah Schraft, and directed by executive producer Mimi Leder. It was released on Apple TV+ on October 11, 2023.

The series follows the characters and culture behind a network broadcast morning news program, The Morning Show. After allegations of sexual misconduct, the male co-anchor of the program, Mitch Kessler, is forced off the show. It follows Mitch's co-host, Alex Levy, and a conservative reporter Bradley Jackson, who attracts the attention of the show's producers after a viral video. In the episode, Alex conducts an interview with Paul, while Bradley discovers that Hal plans to surrender to the authorities.

The episode received generally positive reviews from critics, who praised the performances and character development.

== Plot ==
Talks between UBA and Hyperion's merger resurface, with Paul (Jon Hamm) answering questions to staff members in the station. He promises to maintain the network's integrity and prevent another cyberattack. To reassure everything is in control, he agrees to an interview conducted by Alex (Jennifer Aniston) for Alex Unfiltered.

Bradley (Reese Witherspoon) is visited by Hal (Joe Tippett), his wife Cheryl (Samantha Sloyan) and their baby, who stay with her for a few days. During this, Hal confides in Bradley that he plans to surrender to the FBI for his role in the Capitol attack, feeling he will get a better sentence. Bradley opposes as she can also go to prison, but Hal stands firm on his decision. To get him to change his mind, she invites him to a tour visit to the show, where she interviews a man who is facing trial for his participation in the attack, lamenting that he ruined his life. This does not work, and Cory (Billy Crudup) is upset that the problem is still afoot.

Alex visits Paul at his house with a camera crew and the interview begins. She questions his surveillance software, and asks about a tech incubator, as a Stanford student came up with the code. Paul bought the code for $50,000 and used it in his company, while the student was forced to sign a non-disclosure agreement. When Alex states that the student tried to commit suicide after regretting the decision, Paul opens up that he did not pay enough attention to his staff, including his own wife who left him. Paul maintains he changed for the better, and feels he should talk to the student. After the interview is over and the crew leaves, Alex and Paul kiss and end up having sex. When Cory calls to reassure Paul that they do not have to run the interview if he does not want, Paul tells him it fully works.

Chip (Mark Duplass) surprises Isabella (Hannah Leder) by proposing marriage. However, she turns it down, as she feels he is still in love with Alex. Laura (Julianna Margulies) senses Bradley's anxiety while having a drink with her so she visits Hal and expresses her desire to be in a relationship with his sister. Hal decides not to turn himself in and leaves a note for Bradley telling her that before returning home with his family. At the station, Paul meets with Stella (Greta Lee), who was the Stanford student. Paul wants to make up for the sale and explains that when the merger is completed, he will fire Cory and offers her the role of CEO.

== Development ==
=== Production ===
The episode was written by consulting producer Micah Schraft, and directed by executive producer Mimi Leder. This was Schraft's first writing credit, and Leder's tenth directing credit.

== Critical reviews ==
"The Stanford Student" received generally positive reviews from critics. Max Gao of The A.V. Club gave the episode a "B–" grade and wrote, "With the addition of Jon Hamm and Nicole Beharie this season, The Morning Show has finally transformed from a clunky, heavy-handed newsroom drama into a soapy guilty pleasure. After all, at a time when we could just turn on a real-life news network to despair about the state of the world, why else would we subject ourselves to reliving and reexamining so much of our recent history through one of the most meta shows on television?"

Maggie Fremont of Vulture gave the episode a 4 star rating out of 5 and wrote, "Bradley is in the clear. With this weight lifted off of her, she goes to see Laura, tells her that she misses her, and the two make out in the street. Something tells me, though, that the minute Laura finds out what Bradley did — and she will definitely find out — she might regret this reunion." Kimberly Roots of TVLine wrote, "now that she's back on top, Alex decides to celebrate by… sleeping with one of her interview subjects who JUST HAPPENS TO ALSO BE HER NEW BOSS. It's journalistically unethical. It's a poor career move. And it's just so damn pathetic, given all that's happened."

Meghan O'Keefe of Decider wrote, "There's also something to be said for the fact that The Morning Show maybe — just maybe — has finally broken free of the shadow of sexual trauma that defined its earliest #MeToo-inspired storylines. Mitch Kessler is dead. Bradley Jackson has wandered into a January 6 storyline wherein she's committing crimes to keep her insurrectionist brother out of prison. Maybe — again, just maybe — someone on this show can enjoy a little sex for once." Lacy Baugher of Telltale TV gave the episode a 4 star rating out of 5 and wrote, "Their dynamics are intriguing and I want to see more of where these relationships go. But it's... well, let's just say it's peak The Morning Show to use the forward motion of those romances to essentially derail two fairly significant larger plots."
