= Beckham (TV series) =

2023 docuseries

- Genre: Docuseries
- Directed by: Fisher Stevens
- Starring: David Beckham
- Composers: Camilo Forero; Anze Rozman
- Country of origin: United Kingdom
- Original languages: English; Spanish; Italian (Note: With a few dialogue in Catalan)
- No. of episodes: 4

Production
- Executive producers: David Gardner; Gary Neville
- Producers: John Battsek; Nicola Howson; Fisher Stevens; Billie Shepherd
- Running time: 66-76 minutes
- Production company: Highly Flammable

Original release
- Network: Netflix
- Release: 4 October 2023

Beckham is a 2023 British four-part docuseries created for Netflix. It was directed by Fisher Stevens, and stars David Beckham.

== Summary ==
The series centers on the life of professional footballer David Beckham and his wife, singer and fashion designer Victoria Beckham.

== Release and reception ==
All episodes were released on October 4, 2023 on Netflix.

The series received an 88% approval rating based on 24 reviews on the review aggregator site Rotten Tomatoes. It was nominated for five Primetime Emmy Awards including Outstanding Documentary or Nonfiction Series.
