= Update Your Priors =

- The Morning Show episode
- Episode no.: Season 3 Episode 9
- Directed by: Stacie Passon
- Story by: Shalisha Francis-Feusner
- Teleplay by: Laura Wexler
- Cinematography by: Tami Reiker
- Editing by: J. Kathleen Gibson
- Original release date: November 1, 2023
- Running time: 46 minutes

Guest appearances
- Marcia Gay Harden as Maggie Brener (special guest star); Joe Tippett as Hal Jackson; Holland Taylor as Cybil Reynolds; Tig Notaro as Amanda Robinson; Elizabeth Perkins as Elena Daniels; Hannah Leder as Isabella; Jack Conley as Earl; Alano Miller as Marcus Hunter; Tara Karsian as Gayle Berman; Theo Iyer as Kyle

Episode chronology
← Previous "DNF"	Next → "The Overview Effect"

"Update Your Priors" is the ninth episode of the third season of the American drama television series The Morning Show, inspired by Brian Stelter's 2013 book Top of the Morning. It is the 29th overall episode of the series and was written by Laura Wexler from a story by consulting producer Shalisha Francis-Feusner, and directed by Stacie Passon. It was released on Apple TV+ on November 1, 2023.

The series follows the characters and culture behind a network broadcast morning news program, The Morning Show. After allegations of sexual misconduct, the male co-anchor of the program, Mitch Kessler, is forced off the show. It follows Mitch's co-host, Alex Levy, and a conservative reporter Bradley Jackson, who attracts the attention of the show's producers after a viral video. In the episode, Alex considers Paul's offer, while Laura confronts Bradley for covering Hal's actions in the Capitol.

The episode received highly positive reviews from critics, who praised the performances, writing and climax. For the episode, Marcia Gay Harden received a nomination for Outstanding Guest Actress in a Drama Series at the 76th Primetime Emmy Awards.

== Plot ==
Alex (Jennifer Aniston) is still hesitating over accepting Paul's offer to leave UBA, despite Paul (Jon Hamm) affirming that she would start anew without any of the baggage. During this, she is visited by Maggie (Marcia Gay Harden), who is writing over the incoming merger. When Alex asks her about the future of the network, Maggie believes UBA only has 5 years left.

Bradley (Reese Witherspoon) and Stella (Greta Lee) begin investigating Hyperion, hoping to find any dirt for Cory (Billy Crudup). They discover that Hyperion's funds are far lower than anticipated, and that Paul put all the blame on the network instead of his company. Cory still wants to push for the merger, when Cybil (Holland Taylor) surprisingly shows up. She reveals that she has bought the majority of UBA shares in an attempt to stop the acquisition, and warns Cory that Paul is going to sell the network. An irate Cory confronts Alex, who confirms she knew about the plan. Nevertheless, Alex states that she feels no sympathy for Cory, saying he never cared for anyone but himself, and warns that she will hire any employee from UBA who disliked Cory.

After consulting with her co-worker Elena (Elizabeth Perkins), Laura (Julianna Margulies) meets with Bradley. She has discovered Hal (Joe Tippett) was part of the Capitol attack, and knows that Bradley covered for him. Laura also brings up Cory, confirming that he helped Bradley in covering it out of love. Bradley tries to defend her decision, but Laura stops her, feeling tired that she ruined her life for her brother. While Laura will not report her to the FBI, she breaks up her relationship with Bradley and kicks her out of the house, devastating her.

Before her the evening show, Bradley is visited by Paul in her dressing room. She makes it clear she knows about his financial turmoils, but Paul is not upset. He mentions Hal, revealing that he knows he was in the Capitol and that Bradley was with him. He warns her to stop investigating his company, or he will report her, Hal, Laura and Cory to the FBI. At the show, Bradley begins reporting the Russian invasion of Ukraine, but stops short after a few minutes. To the staff's shock, Bradley announces that she is resigning the network due to "personal reasons." Cory is also informed by Stella that the Vault just issued a news report, claiming that Cory groomed Bradley and leaked the reports of outing her and Laura after she rejected him. Cory realizes that Paul sent it, just as he is informed that security will escort him out of the building.

== Development ==
=== Production ===
The episode was written by Laura Wexler from a story by consulting producer Shalisha Francis-Feusner, and directed by Stacie Passon. This was Wexler's first writing credit, Francis-Feusner's first writing credit, and Passon's second directing credit.

== Critical reviews ==
"Update Your Priors" received highly positive reviews from critics. Max Gao of The A.V. Club gave the episode an "A–" grade and wrote, "There's a train wreck, and then there’s whatever the hell happens to Cory Ellison on this week's episode of The Morning Show. In a season that has already seen Bradley Jackson go to space and conceal evidence of her brother storming the Capitol on Jan. 6, the penultimate episode of the third season is an unhinged masterclass in feverish, morning-show melodrama—elevated, in no small part, by the committed performance of Billy Crudup, easily the best actor on this messy show."

Maggie Fremont of Vulture gave the episode a 4 star rating out of 5 and wrote, "It's the most wonderful time of the year: Things are falling apart on The Morning Show. In a good way! In an “everything from the entire season is coming together to rain down chaos on our cute little characters” way. That's right! If you didn't think The Morning Show could somehow tie together the UBA sale, Cybil Reynolds's ouster, billionaires being terrible, the January 6 insurrection, a cyberattack, and literal outer space, well, you don't know this cuckoo-for–Cocoa Puffs show."

Nicole Gallucci of Decider wrote, "Three seasons deep, it's hard to tell what's genuine and what's an act with Cory, and that's what makes his character so compelling. He's sharp, sexy, and makes people feel like anything is possible. But he also contains multitudes and lets the contagious pep in his step lie dormant when others aren’t watching. With each passing episode, we're reminded The Morning Show boss is an essential part of the series. And Billy Crudup is an essential part of Cory Ellison." Lacy Baugher of Telltale TV gave the episode a 4.5 star rating out of 5 and wrote, "The Morning Show Season 3 Episode 9, “Update Your Priors” is the most bonkers and absolute best installment of this run of episodes to date, an hour that sees multiple big reveals and major emotional confrontations, all with the future of UBA on the line."

=== Accolades ===
TVLine named Billy Crudup the "Performer of the Week" for the week of November 4, 2023, for his performance in the episode. The site wrote, "We can only imagine how much physical pain Cory was in after punching a wall. But we could absolutely feel the pain of betrayal when Crudup proceeded to drop the mother of all F-bombs. Conversely, it took all of two words for Crudup to establish a man running on empty. After an explosive exposé was brought to his attention, making him out to be just another Hollywood predator, his assistant ran in, and all Cory could muster was a languid “Now what?” Cory's never been worse for wear. Crudup, on the other hand, has never been better."

For the episode, Marcia Gay Harden received a nomination for Outstanding Guest Actress in a Drama Series at the 76th Primetime Emmy Awards. She would lose to Michaela Coel for Mr. & Mrs. Smith.
