= Strict Scrutiny (The Morning Show) =

- The Morning Show episode
- Episode no.: Season 3 Episode 7
- Directed by: Jennifer Getzinger
- Written by: Bill Kennedy
- Cinematography by: Tami Reiker
- Editing by: J. Kathleen Gibson
- Original release date: October 18, 2023
- Running time: 53 minutes

Guest appearances
- Lindsay Duncan as Martha; Natalie Morales as Kate Danton; Tig Notaro as Amanda Robinson; Alano Miller as Marcus Hunter; Tara Karsian as Gayle Berman; Andrea Bendewald as Valérie; Theo Iyer as Kyle; Sean Alexander James as Jimbo; Stephen Fry as Leonard Cromwell

Episode chronology
← Previous "The Stanford Student"	Next → "DNF"

"Strict Scrutiny" is the seventh episode of the third season of the American drama television series The Morning Show, inspired by Brian Stelter's 2013 book Top of the Morning. It is the 27th overall episode of the series and was written by supervising producer Bill Kennedy, and directed by Jennifer Getzinger. It was released on Apple TV+ on October 18, 2023.

The series follows the characters and culture behind a network broadcast morning news program, The Morning Show. After allegations of sexual misconduct, the male co-anchor of the program, Mitch Kessler, is forced off the show. It follows Mitch's co-host, Alex Levy, and a conservative reporter Bradley Jackson, who attracts the attention of the show's producers after a viral video. In the episode, Cory takes Bradley on a trip to Connecticut, while Alex and Paul attend a benefit party.

The episode received positive reviews from critics, who praised the performances (particularly Crudup), character development and themes.

== Plot ==
After Leonard (Stephen Fry) mentions problems with the board over the incoming merger, Cory (Billy Crudup) decides to leave with Bradley (Reese Witherspoon) on a trip to Connecticut, promising she will be back in time for the evening edition.

The UBA staff attend a benefit party, with Paul Marks (Jon Hamm) in attendance. He confirms plans for a new shuttle launch, Hyperion 2, which will take the passengers to the International Space Station. During this, Alex (Jennifer Aniston) and Paul discover that the same company that outed Bradley have a photo of Alex and Paul together and are threatening to release it. Paul shows Alex the photo and they decide to pay to get rid of the story, but the company is not interested in the money. During this, Stella (Greta Lee) is told by her friend Kate (Natalie Morales) that Paul fired her from the company, and is frustrated that Stella does not see Paul for his bad influence. When she talks with Mia (Karen Pittman) over the offer, Mia tells her to accept it as she feels "white men don't give them up willingly."

The person Cory needed to hurriedly visit in Connecticut turns out to be his mother, Martha (Lindsay Duncan), a well-connected political operative who previously worked for Geraldine Ferraro. She takes an immediate liking to Bradley, who is compelled to stay for dinner and miss her evening news show. They have a friendly dinner until Cory reveals the purpose of the visit — to ask his mother to refrain from using her government connections to help push the merger through. Martha warns Bradley that Cory is a bad person, but as they drive back to New York, Bradley tells Cory she stands with him.

News breaks of the overturning of Roe v. Wade, alarming everyone at the benefit party. Christine (Nicole Beharie) is devastated by the news, and writes "Abort the Court" in the bathroom. When Cory meets with Stella, she finally admits Paul was planning to fire him and replace him with her. Cory is not upset, and asks her to earn Paul's trust to find anything valuable. Alex arrives at her office, where she has a conversation with Chip (Mark Duplass) over the recent events. After Chip leaves, Paul enters to talk about the photo. As they talk, they kiss. Chip returns to the office to inform Alex about covering the overturning, and stands shocked to see Alex and Paul kissing.

== Development ==
=== Production ===
The episode was written by supervising producer Bill Kennedy, and directed by Jennifer Getzinger. This was Kennedy's first writing credit, and Getzinger's first directing credit.

=== Writing ===
The episode address the Roe v. Wade overturn. The writers were paying attention to the outcome of the situation, eventually inserting the news into the series after it was confirmed.

== Critical reviews ==
"Strict Scrutiny" received positive reviews from critics. Max Gao of The A.V. Club gave the episode a "B+" grade. Maggie Fremont of Vulture gave the episode a 4 star rating out of 5 and wrote, "Now, listen. The Morning Show is patently silly, and I do not take it seriously 92 percent of the time for health reasons, but wow, wow, wow, what a sentiment! If only Mia would do anything remotely close to this apparent cold-killer life philosophy she has at the moment." Kimberly Roots of TVLine wrote, "Bradley tags along on an unasked-for deep dive into the Ellison family dynamic in this week's The Morning Show. I'd feel bad for her, except that her deliciously awkward day with Cory and someone from his foundational years provides some of the season's most unhinged zaniness. Thanks for taking one for the team, Bradley."

Meghan O'Keefe of Decider wrote, "Mia gets a fun storyline in The Morning Show Season 3, where she's hung up on a hot war correspondent she had an ill-fated romance with during COVID. However, where she really shines is in bringing the other characters down to earth and expressing deep rooted rage with eloquence and grace. So it was a delight to watch her buddy up with Stella over the course of the season and even more delightful to see she got to wear a dress made famous this spring by Meghan Markle to a fancy gala in the Big Apple." Lacy Baugher of Telltale TV gave the episode a 4 star rating out of 5 and praised the "always fabulous" guest star Lindsay Duncan.
