= DNF (The Morning Show) =

- The Morning Show episode
- Episode no.: Season 3 Episode 8
- Directed by: Millicent Shelton
- Written by: Selina Fillinger
- Cinematography by: John Grillo
- Editing by: Bjørn T. Myrholt
- Original release date: October 25, 2023
- Running time: 54 minutes

Guest appearances
- Tig Notaro as Amanda Robinson; Natalie Morales as Kate Danton; Hannah Leder as Isabella; Shannon Woodward as Jess Bennett; Clive Standen as Andre Ford; Tom Irwin as Fred Micklen; Victoria Tate as Rena Robinson; Shari Belafonte as Julia; Eli Bildner as Joel Rapkin; Amber Friendly as Layla Bell; Joe Marinelli as Donny Spagnoli; Joe Pacheco as Bart Daley; Choni Francis as RJ Smith; Mindy Kaling as Audra Khatri

Episode chronology
← Previous "Strict Scrutiny"	Next → "Update Your Priors"

"DNF" is the eighth episode of the third season of the American drama television series The Morning Show, inspired by Brian Stelter's 2013 book Top of the Morning. It is the 28th overall episode of the series and was written by Selina Fillinger, and directed by Millicent Shelton. It was released on Apple TV+ on October 25, 2023.

The series follows the characters and culture behind a network broadcast morning news program, The Morning Show. After allegations of sexual misconduct, the male co-anchor of the program, Mitch Kessler, is forced off the show. It follows Mitch's co-host, Alex Levy, and a conservative reporter Bradley Jackson, who attracts the attention of the show's producers after a viral video. In the episode, the photo of Alex and Paul kissing is leaked to the media, while Laura investigates Bradley's behavior.

The episode received positive reviews from critics, who praised Jennifer Aniston’s performance, storylines and character development.

== Plot ==
On her way to the station, Christine (Nicole Beharie) is covered in red paint thrown by a pro-life woman, after she posted her "Abort the Court" photo on social media. Mia (Karen Pittman) informs her that she will have to be excluded from any news related to Roe v. Wade, and that she will need security for the coming days.

The photo with Alex (Jennifer Aniston) and Paul (Jon Hamm) kissing is leaked, and Alex is frustrated by her co-workers commenting on the matter. She is further angered when she finds that Cory (Billy Crudup) wants to re-cut Paul's interview, and they agree to delay it by one week so Alex can interview a Planned Parenthood employee. When the employee cancels the guest appearance, Chip (Mark Duplass) brings in Jess Bennett (Shannon Woodward), a writer who predicted the overturning. However, Jess uses the interview to question Alex's integrity after her relationship with Paul is disclosed, feeling that this can cloud her judgment. Afterwards, Alex gets into a heated argument with Chip for the interview, and ends up firing him.

Laura (Julianna Margulies) is astonished to learn that Bradley (Reese Witherspoon) spent a day with Cory and met his mother, with Audra (Mindy Kaling) finding it suspicious. Per Audra's suggestion, she decides to check Bradley's leaked e-mails, which contain photos of the Capitol attack and asking Cory to meet her. Finding that she repeatedly called Hal, she checks his social media and finds that he was in Washington, D.C. during the attack, finally realizing he was in the Capitol. Stella (Greta Lee) asks Bradley to speak to Kate (Natalie Morales), believing her to be a whistleblower against Paul, but she is unsuccessful.

Mia is surprised when Andre (Clive Standen) is not just alive and well, but is taking part in an interview with her rival network. They get into a fight, but end up reconciling when Mia admits she is glad he survived. During a photoshoot with Cory, Paul makes it clear he is not looking favorably at him. He later visits Alex, who is frustrated with how the interview was handled and considers quitting. Paul then suggests that he could sell UBA after the merger, and believes Alex could help him in rebuilding a new media empire. Alex is surprised, but intrigued by the idea.

== Development ==
=== Production ===
The episode was written by Selina Fillinger, and directed by Millicent Shelton. This was Fillinger's first writing credit, and Shelton's first directing credit.

== Critical reviews ==
"DNF" received positive reviews from critics. Max Gao of The A.V. Club gave the episode a "B" grade and wrote, "Does anyone on The Morning Show ever think before they act in a crisis? For a bunch of high-powered journalists and executives who are supposed to be a few steps ahead of the public at any given time, these characters seem to spend an awful lot of time being the news rather than reporting on the news, but that is precisely what makes this soapy show so endlessly watchable. God help UBA's overworked public-relations team. They haven't had a day off in years."

Maggie Fremont of Vulture gave the episode a 3 star rating out of 5 and wrote, "The question now becomes, will Laura out Bradley, and will she do it before Bradley has a chance to solve this Paul Marks mystery? We are barreling toward the season-three finale, and things are getting exciting, folks."

Kayla Laguerre-Lewis of Screen Rant wrote, "The Morning Show has come a long way since the season 1 finale, and it was a nice way to wrap up the episode as the season 3 finale approaches." Lacy Baugher of Telltale TV gave the episode a 4 star rating out of 5 and wrote, "Season 3 to date has featured a surprisingly mature and generally mellow Alex... She was probably overdue for a meltdown or two is what I'm saying, and boy does this episode deliver."
