= Tomorrow Is Tomorrow =

- Shōgun episode
- Episode no.: Season 1 Episode 3
- Directed by: Charlotte Brändström
- Written by: Shannon Goss
- Cinematography by: Aril Wretblad
- Editing by: Thomas A. Krueger
- Original release date: March 5, 2024
- Running time: 53 minutes

Guest appearances
- Néstor Carbonell as Vasco Rodrigues; Tokuma Nishioka as Toda "Iron Fist" Hiromatsu; Shinnosuke Abe as Toda "Buntaro" Hirokatsu; Moeka Hoshi as Usami Fuji; Louis Ferreira as Ferreira; Yuki Kura as Yoshii Nagakado; Yoriko Dōguchi as Kiri no Kata; Paulino Nunes as Father Visitor Carlo Dell'Acqua; Hiromoto Ida as Kiyama ukon Sadanaga; Toshi Toda as Sugiyama Josui; Takeshi Kurokawa as Ohno Harunobu

Episode chronology
← Previous "Servants of Two Masters"	Next → "The Eightfold Fence"

"Tomorrow Is Tomorrow" (Japanese: 明日は明日, Hepburn: Asu wa Asu) is the third episode of the American historical drama television series Shōgun, based on the novel by James Clavell. The episode was written by co-executive producer Shannon Goss, and directed by Charlotte Brändström. It was released on Hulu on March 5, 2024, and it also aired on FX on the same day.

The series is set in 1600, and follows three characters. John Blackthorne, a risk-taking English sailor who ends up shipwrecked in Japan, a land whose unfamiliar culture will ultimately redefine him; Lord Toranaga, a shrewd, powerful daimyo, at odds with his own dangerous, political rivals; and Lady Mariko, a woman with invaluable skills but dishonorable family ties, who must prove her value and allegiance. In the episode, Blackthorne and Toranaga set out to leave Osaka Castle, while evading assassins.

According to Nielsen Media Research, the episode was seen by an estimated 0.492 million household viewers and gained a 0.09 ratings share among adults aged 18–49. The episode received highly positive reviews from critics, who praised the battle sequences and directing.

== Plot ==
Yabushige meets with Toranaga right after writing his will. Toranaga reveals the assassination attempt on Blackthorne and suspects that Yabushige acted on Ishido's orders, which he denies. Worried about their safety, Toranaga decides to leave Osaka with Blackthorne and his wife Kiri, planning to move to the more secure Ajiro. After passing Ishido's suspicions, Toranaga secretly switches places with Kiri's litter, which is witnessed by Blackthorne and Mariko. When Ishido's men insist on checking the litter, Blackthorne provokes an argument to distract them until they are permitted to leave.

Ferreira, captain-general of the Black Ship, is annoyed by the constant delays in shipping and decides to sail without receiving permission from Toranaga. That night, Kiyama's men attack the caravan, forcing Toranaga to expose himself to help organize a defense. They are forced to race towards a ship to take them to Ajiro, but Mariko's husband, Toda "Buntaro" Hirokatsu, chooses to stay behind to distract their pursuers and give them time to reach the harbor. Realizing that Kiyama has sent additional men to intercept his vessel, Toranaga makes a deal with the Portuguese to let his entourage board the Black Ship. Ferreira allows him to board but prohibits Blackthorne from joining them.

Using his connection to the Black Ship, Blackthorne, with Rodrigues' assistance, breaks through the blockade and persuades Toranaga to rejoin him aboard his own ship. Back in Osaka, Iron Fist Hiromatsu informs the Council of Regents on Toranaga's behalf that he has officially resigned from his position. At sea, Toranaga confronts Blackthorne over the Portuguese allegations that he is a pirate, but states that he will not be charged as it will take a great deal of time to "translate" any evidence of such crimes. He grants him the rank of hatamoto so that he may assist Yabushige with training a new regiment in Western-style tactics. Despite initially hesitating, Blackthorne agrees. He then shows Toranaga how to dive into the water, and they decide to compete in a race towards the nearest shore.

== Production ==
=== Development ===
In February 2024, Hulu confirmed that the third episode of the series would be titled "Tomorrow Is Tomorrow", and was to be written by co-executive producer Shannon Goss and directed by Charlotte Brändström. It was Goss' first writing credit, and Brändström's first directing credit.

=== Writing ===
Justin Marks considered the boat race as the hardest scene to film in the series. He explained that Toranaga's stare at Blackthorne when he is left behind could be interpreted as "is this a guy who just destiny swallows up or is this the guy who's going to make his own fate in some way." He hoped that the episode would test the loyalty that the characters would convey during these sequences, raising the question if they can trust each other.

=== Set design ===
Production designer Helen Jarvis worked on the design of the two ships shown in the episode. The Black Ship was entrusted with showing the character with "a certain kind of not sinister aspect to them" and the ship "just seemed to echo that." In contrast, the Japanese galley used by Toranaga is depicted with much lighter, unfinished wood

== Reception ==
=== Viewers ===
In its original FX broadcast, "Tomorrow Is Tomorrow" was seen by an estimated 0.492 million household viewers and gained a 0.09 ratings share among adults aged 18–49, according to Nielsen Media Research. This means that 0.09 percent of all households with televisions watched the episode. This was a 36% decrease in viewership from the previous episode, which was seen by an estimated 0.764 million household viewers and gained a 0.14 ratings share among adults aged 18–49.

=== Critical reviews ===
"Tomorrow Is Tomorrow" received highly positive reviews from critics. The review aggregator website Rotten Tomatoes reported a 100% approval rating for the episode, based on 4 reviews.

Meredith Hobbs Coons of The A.V. Club gave the episode a "B+" and wrote, "In general, this episode feels lighter. There are some little jokes in this episode, more so than in the others so far, and there's a little boat race to boot. Plus, each scene is still beautifully and pristinely shot, and each part remains well-acted. And even with the amusing diversions throughout the episode, the plot is still definitely moving." Jesse Raub of Vulture gave the episode a perfect 5 star rating out of 5 and wrote, "The action in "Tomorrow Is Tomorrow" is not all about forging alliances, however. We also get a daring escape, a frantic ambush, and a tense chase sequence, all things viewers have likely been waiting to check off their historical-epic Bingo cards."

Sean T. Collins of The New York Times wrote, "The strength of Shogun is in these personal moments, not in indifferently filmed sword fights. I'd rather watch Blackthorne and Rodrigues scream-laughing obscenities at each other, the shifty Lord Yabushige switching loyalties from scene to scene, or the continuing emotional ordeal of Fuji, whose husband and baby were sacrificed to notions of feudal honor. If Shogun is to succeed, it's clear now that its strength is the more intimate material, rather than the large-scale action it doesn't appear to have in hand." Josh Rosenberg of Esquire wrote, "That's a lot for the first 30 minutes of episode 3. A big three-sided battle sequence, a bunch of sword-fighting, and some potentially confusing switcheroos. In totality, this episode downright feels like a feature film."

Johnny Loftus of Decider wrote, "If tomorrow is tomorrow, then that means today is right now, and yesterday is gone forever. Which might as well be the mantra for all of our Shōgun principals. In 1600 Japan, living in the moment doesn't guarantee stability. Like at all. But it at least affords a chance at fulfillment." Tyler Johnson of TV Fanatic gave the episode a 4.5 star rating out of 5 and wrote, "There's no denying that this is a series that demands the viewer's full attention - a throwback to the height of the prestige TV era, when audiences demonstrated a willingness to put in work for their favorite series. And thus far, the rewards have been well worth the effort."
