= Michał Dymek =

Polish cinematographer (born 1990 or 1991)

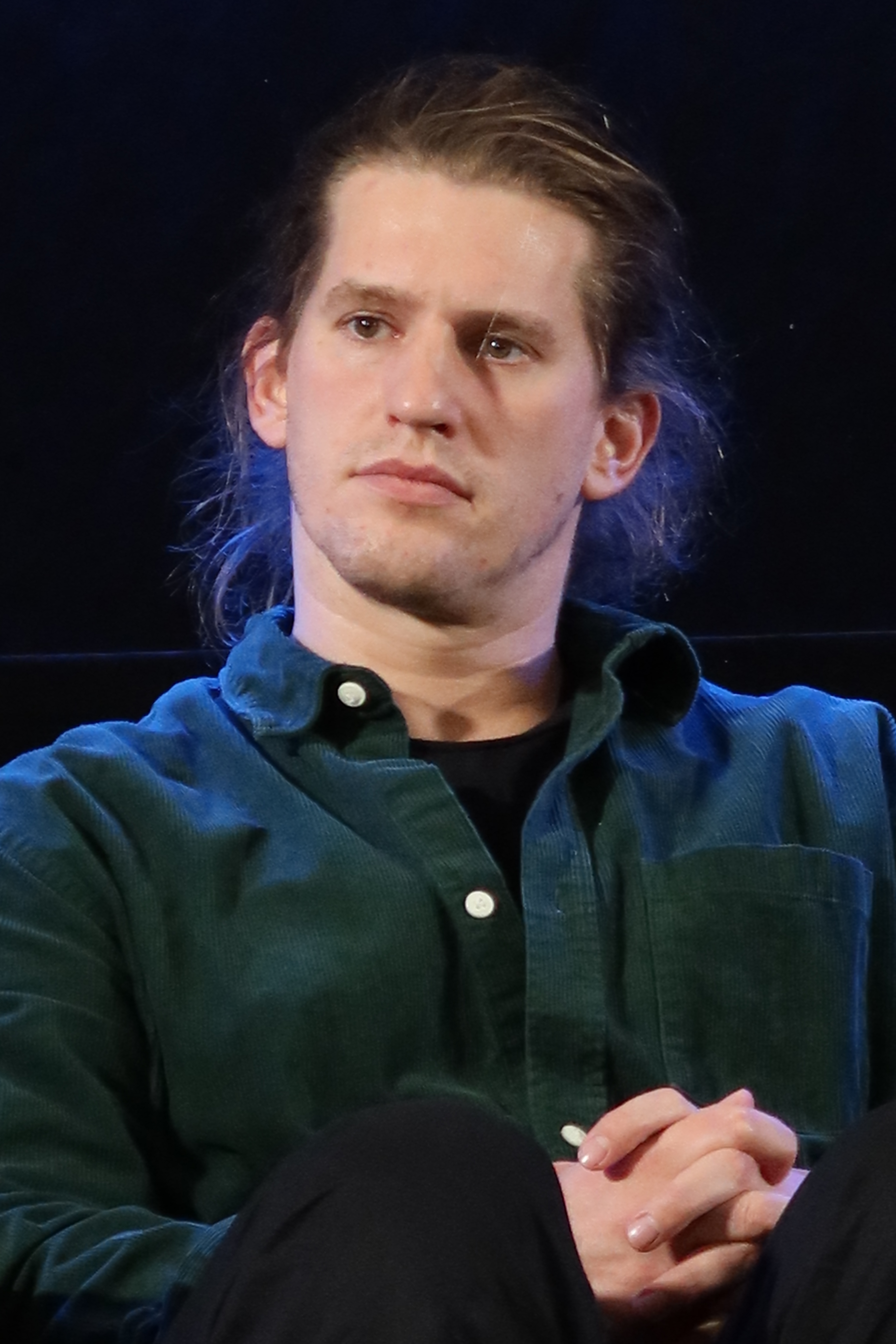
- Dymek in 2025
- Born: 1990 or 1991 (age 35–36); Warsaw, Poland
- Education: Łódź Film School
- Occupation: Cinematographer
- Website: michaldymek.com

Michał Dymek (Polish: [ˈmixaw ˈdɨmɛk]; born 1990 or 1991) is a Polish cinematographer.

== Early life ==
Dymek was born in Warsaw. He graduated from the Łódź Film School in 2017.

== Career ==
Dymek gained recognition in 2020 with his work on Magnus von Horn's sophomore feature, Sweat. He later collaborated with Jerzy Skolimowski on his film EO, which was nominated for the Academy Award for Best International Feature Film.

His second collaboration with von Horn, The Girl with the Needle, earned him a Golden Frog at Camerimage in 2024. That year, was also recognized for his work on Jesse Eisenberg's sophomore feature, A Real Pain.

== Filmography ==
Year	Title	Director	Notes	Ref.
2016	Adaptation	Bartosz Kruhlik	Short film	
2017	The Best Fireworks Ever	Aleksandra Terpińska	Short film	
2018	My Friend the Polish Girl	Ewa Banaszkiewicz; Mateusz Dymek		
2019	Dolce Fine Giornata	Jacek Borcuch		
2019	Supernova	Bartosz Kruhlik		
2019	Nocturnal	Nathalie Biancheri		
2020	Sweat	Magnus von Horn		
2020	Hura, wciąż żyjemy!	Agnieszka Polska		
2021	Wolf	Nathalie Biancheri		
2022	EO	Jerzy Skolimowski		
2023	Unmoored	Caroline Ingvarsson		
2024	A Real Pain	Jesse Eisenberg		
2024	The Girl with the Needle	Magnus von Horn		
2024	Pierce	Nelicia Low		
2025	How to Shoot a Ghost	Charlie Kaufman	Short film	
2025	Good Boy	Jan Komasa		
2026	Dzięcioł i Violetta	Karolina Bielawska		
TBA	Transatlantyk 2010	Bartosz Kruhlik		
TBA	Sweetsick	Alice Birch		
TBA	De Noche	Todd Haynes		

== Awards and nominations ==
Award	Year	Category	Nominated work	Result	Ref.
American Society of Cinematographers Awards	2025	Spotlight Award	The Girl with the Needle	Nominated	
Bodil Awards	2026	Best Cinematographer	The Girl with the Needle	Won	
Camerimage	2024	Golden Frog	The Girl with the Needle	Won	
Los Angeles Film Critics Association Awards	2022	Best Cinematography	EO	Won	
National Society of Film Critics Awards	2023	Best Cinematography	EO	Won	
Polish Film Awards	2023	Best Cinematography	EO	Won	
Polish Film Awards	2025	Best Cinematography	The Girl with the Needle	Won	
Polish Film Festival	2020	Best Cinematography	Sweat	Won	
Polish Film Festival	2024	Best Cinematography	The Girl with the Needle	Won	
Robert Awards	2026	Best Cinematography	The Girl with the Needle	Won	
Seville European Film Festival	2024	Best Photography	The Girl with the Needle	Won	
