= Anjin (Shōgun) =

- Shōgun episode
- Episode no.: Season 1 Episode 1
- Directed by: Jonathan van Tulleken
- Written by: Rachel Kondo; Justin Marks
- Cinematography by: Christopher Ross
- Editing by: Maria Gonzales
- Original release date: February 27, 2024
- Running time: 70 minutes

Guest appearances
- Néstor Carbonell as Vasco Rodrigues; Tokuma Nishioka as Toda "Iron Fist" Hiromatsu; Hiroto Kanai as Kashigi Omi; Yasunari Takeshima as Tonomoto Akinao; Moeka Hoshi as Usami Fuji; Yuki Kura as Yoshii Nagakado; Ayo as Daiyoin / Lady Iyo; Ned Dennehy as Captain-General; Hiromoto Ida as Kiyama ukon Sadanaga; Toshi Toda as Sugiyama Josui; Takeshi Kurokawa as Ohno Harunobu; Yuki Takao as Usami Tadayoshi; Yuka Kouri as Kiku

Episode chronology
| ← Previous — | Next → "Servants of Two Masters" |

"Anjin" (Japanese: 按針) is the series premiere of the American historical drama television series Shōgun, based on the novel by James Clavell. The episode was written by series developers Rachel Kondo and Justin Marks, and directed by co-executive producer Jonathan van Tulleken. It was released on Hulu on February 27, 2024, and it also aired on FX on the same day.

The series is set in 1600, and follows three characters. John Blackthorne, a risk-taking English sailor who ends up shipwrecked in Japan, a land whose unfamiliar culture will ultimately redefine him; Lord Toranaga, a shrewd, powerful daimyo, at odds with his own dangerous, political rivals; and Lady Mariko, a woman with invaluable skills but dishonorable family ties, who must prove her value and allegiance.

According to Nielsen Media Research, the episode was seen by an estimated 0.764 million household viewers and gained a 0.14 ratings share among adults aged 18–49. The series premiere received critical acclaim, with major praise for the visuals, performances and production values. Tadanobu Asano and Néstor Carbonell submitted the episode to support their Emmy Award nominations for Outstanding Supporting Actor in a Drama Series and Outstanding Guest Actor in a Drama Series, with Carbonell winning in his category.

== Plot ==
In 1600 Osaka, the reigning Taikō has died, leaving five equal regents to maintain control of Osaka Castle. The Dutch trading ship Erasmus gets stranded off the coast of Ajiro after running into fierce storms and running out of food. As part of the Dutch–Portuguese War, the crew have been instructed to disguise themselves as merchants while attacking any Iberian Union coastal settlements and ships they encounter throughout the East Indies, with a secondary objective of locating the mysterious island of Japan and attempting to open diplomatic and trade ties with its rulers. Only a dozen sailors remain, including English privateer John Blackthorne, who manages to collect white sand from the seabed 10 fathoms below the ship and confirm to the ship's captain that they are near Japan. However, doubting their chances and with no food, no water and only one ship remaining, the captain shoots himself in the head as Blackthorne looks over the horizon.

Later, a Christian fisherman named Muraji does his morning prayer while collecting fish, only to witness the Erasmus finally make landfall in Japan; several samurai warriors appear with weapons drawn and approach the ship, led by the daimyo of Ajiro, Kashigi Omi, who personally joins his men in exploring the ship. Alarmed by the presence of foreigners in their country, the warriors imprison the sailors and loot the ship of weapons, riches and other goods.

One of the regents, Yoshii Toranaga, lord of the Kantō, is summoned before his colleagues: his chief rival Ishido Kazunari, lord of Osaka Castle; Kiyama ukon Sadanaga, a Catholic convert exploiting wealth from the Portuguese; Sugiyama Josui, descended from the richest samurai clan in the country; and Ohno Harunobu, a once great warrior who turned to Catholicism after developing leprosy. Toranaga has been accused of consolidating his power and the other regents are considering a motion by Ishido to impeach him, which would also condemn him to seppuku. Toranaga is not scared of their threat, as he claims his sole purpose is to protect the Taikō's young heir, Nakamura Yaechiyo. One of Toranaga's men, Usami Tadayoshi, insults Ishido out of loyalty to Toranaga and is forced to commit seppuku for not only himself but also his infant son, devastating his wife, Fuji, who threatens to kill herself when her husband forces her to hand over their son, but is prevented from doing so by Toranaga's translator, Toda Mariko.

Blackthorne is released from his cell and taken to face Kashigi Yabushige, Lord of Izu, a powerful vassal of Toranaga's clan and Omi's vicious uncle. Blackthorne claims he is a peaceful, shipwrecked merchant, and asks to be allowed to return to his ship with his crew. He realizes that the ruling Toyotomi clan and the Portuguese Empire have formed a secret trade route, with the Catholic Church's Jesuit order being the political and religious rivals of the Protestant Blackthorne. Yabushige's translator, a local Jesuit priest, immediately condemns Blackthorne as a pirate and suggests his execution; however, Blackthorne indirectly saves himself by taking the priest's cross and stomping it into the ground, amusing Yabushige, who chooses another sailor to be executed in his place by being boiled alive in a pot of water, with the sailor banging his head on the pot to end his suffering. However, Yabushige main reasons for sparing Blackthorne's life is to have strategic leverage when negotiating with rival clans due to the potential of opening up new trading routes with other European nations, as well his knowledge on how to operate the dozens of naval cannons and hundreds of muskets seized from the Erasmus.

Toranaga's top general, Toda "Iron Fist" Hiromatsu (who is also Fuji's grandfather), arrives in Ajiro and forces Yabushige to turn over ownership of both the Erasmus and Blackthorne to him; the latter is placed under the supervision of Spanish navigator Vasco Rodrigues. As they return to Osaka, the ship is hit by a severe storm, forcing Blackthorne to assume command as he reorganizes the crew. However, Rodrigues is swept by the tides and washes ashore near a cliff. Blackthorne manipulates Yabushige into helping him rescue Rodrigues, and Yabushige's rope breaks, causing him to fall into the water; unable to swim, he draws his sword to commit seppuku. However, he and Rodrigues are saved when a group of samurai bring them more ropes. The group continue their journey by ship, and Rodrigues reveals to Blackthorne that he found his secret orders onboard the Erasmus and knows his real mission is to actively disrupt the secret Catholic-Portuguese trade monopoly in Asia while plundering and attacking Spanish / Portuguese territories. Blackthorne is then taken to Osaka Castle, coming face to face with Toranaga and Mariko, where he respectfully bows before them.

== Production ==
=== Development ===
In January 2024, Hulu confirmed that the episode would be titled "Anjin", and was to be written by series developers Rachel Kondo and Justin Marks and directed by co-executive producer Jonathan van Tulleken. It was Kondo's first writing credit, Marks' first writing credit, and van Tulleken's first directing credit.

=== Writing ===
Justin Marks explained that the writers hoped they would not make tropes related to the "stranger on a strange land" depictions on other projects. Marks said he wanted "a story about globalization", exploring the culture through different lens. For the Japanese dialogues, the writers would make the scripts in English and, after consulting with researchers, send them to a team of translators in Tokyo to change it to a modern Japanese. Subsequently, the scripts were sent to an unnamed Japanese playwright specialized in jidaigeki to rewrite the dialogues into "a more polished prose."

=== Filming ===
Hiroyuki Sanada, also serving as producer, was essential in the authenticity of the series. He convinced the crew in hiring Japanese crew in different departments, and showed on set every day to check on the production values, even before the director arrived. Before filming started, actors were subjected to a boot camp to train. One of the requirements were learning falcon training, and Sanada explained that the scene with the falcon was his first day of filming.

== Reception ==
=== Viewers ===
In its original FX broadcast, "Anjin" was seen by an estimated 0.764 million household viewers and gained a 0.14 ratings share among adults aged 18–49, according to Nielsen Media Research. This means that 0.14 percent of all households with televisions watched the episode.

=== Critical reviews ===
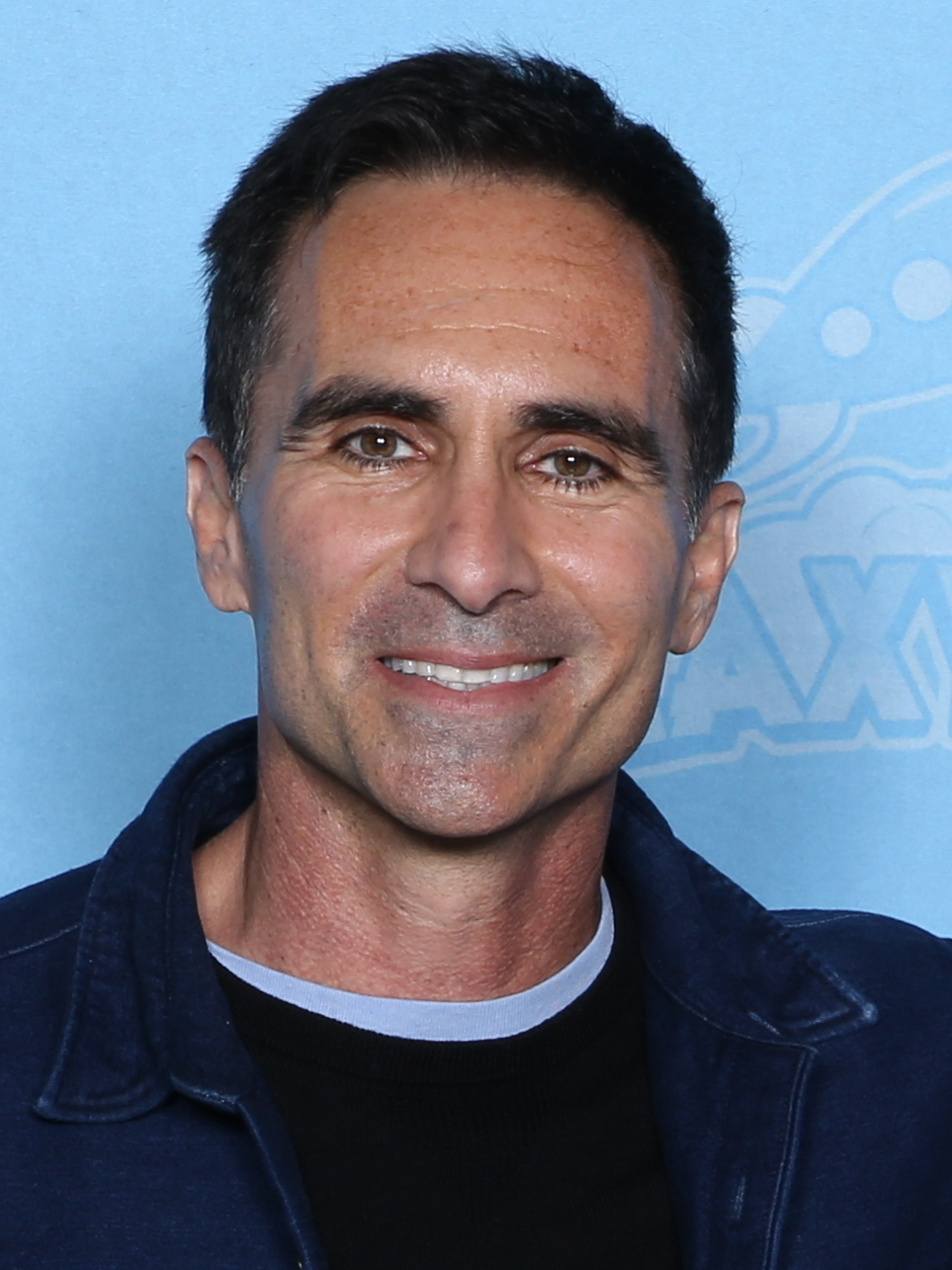
Néstor Carbonell's performance in the episode garnered critical acclaim and won the Primetime Emmy Award for Outstanding Guest Actor in a Drama Series.

"Anjin" received critical acclaim. The review aggregator website Rotten Tomatoes reported a 100% approval rating for the episode, based on 5 reviews, with an average rating of 8.4/10.

Meredith Hobbs Coons of The A.V. Club gave the episode an "A–" and wrote, "With one of these actors serving as a producer on the show, Clavell's daughter Michaela signing on as an executive producer, and a seemingly massive budget to get the historical and cultural details right, authenticity is the name of the game. And it shows." Jesse Raub of Vulture gave the episode a 4 star rating out of 5 and wrote, "When we're first introduced to Lord Toranaga, he's riding a horse through a field with his entourage, watching his falcon dive out of the sky to take down a pheasant. It's bright and sunny, and the audience gets a taste of just how gorgeous Shōgun can be, with its incredible costuming and wide shots of jaw-dropping locations and sets."

Sean T. Collins of The New York Times wrote, "Of the two episodes in this initial offering, the former is by far the weaker. For one thing, it falls victim to a bad case of first episode syndrome: a tendency to front-load shows with attention-grabbing material that is much blunter and broader than what follows." Erik Kain of Forbes wrote, "I'm deeply impressed so far and can't wait to see how this plays out. There's a lot of bad TV out there right now, but Shogun goes to show that there is still genuinely great TV being made as well."

Johnny Loftus of Decider wrote, "Shōgun fits a ton of character backstory, setting of the seventeenth century Japan political scene, foreboding about the pivotal conflict to come, and cultural insight into this first episode, and by its conclusion, not only has Blackthorne learned to speak a few words of Japanese, but we've become immersed in this layered world full of metaphor and bursts of righteous violence." Tyler Johnson of TV Fanatic gave the episode a 4.5 star rating out of 5 and wrote, "A sweeping shot of feudal Osaka concludes with Blackthorne bowing before Toranaga, and the skill with which this pilot (the episode, not the beleaguered Brit who holds that job) handled such complex material leaves us as awed as any of the stunning visuals delivered by director Jonathan Van Tulleken."
