= The Eightfold Fence =

- Shōgun episode
- Episode no.: Season 1 Episode 4
- Directed by: Frederick E. O. Toye
- Written by: Nigel Williams; Emily Yoshida
- Cinematography by: Sam McCurdy
- Editing by: Maria Gonzales
- Original release date: March 12, 2024
- Running time: 57 minutes

Guest appearances
- Hiroto Kanai as Kashigi Omi; Moeka Hoshi as Usami Fuji; Yasunari Takeshima as Tonomoto Akinao; Yuki Kura as Yoshii Nagakado; Yutaka Takeuchi as Akechi Jinsai; Yuka Kouri as Kiku

Episode chronology
← Previous "Tomorrow Is Tomorrow"	Next → "Broken to the Fist"

"The Eightfold Fence" (Japanese: 八重垣, Hepburn: Yaegaki) is the fourth episode of the American historical drama television series Shōgun, based on the novel by James Clavell. The episode was written by Nigel Williams and Emily Yoshida, and directed by Frederick E. O. Toye. It was released on Hulu on March 12, 2024, and it also aired on FX on the same day.

The series is set in 1600, and follows three characters. John Blackthorne, a risk-taking English sailor who ends up shipwrecked in Japan, a land whose unfamiliar culture will ultimately redefine him; Lord Toranaga, a shrewd, powerful daimyo, at odds with his own dangerous, political rivals; and Lady Mariko, a woman with invaluable skills but dishonorable family ties, who must prove her value and allegiance. In the episode, Blackthorne begins training Yabushige's army, while Yabushige faces problems by his association to Toranaga.

According to Nielsen Media Research, the episode was seen by an estimated 0.517 million household viewers and gained a 0.10 ratings share among adults aged 18–49. The episode received critical acclaim, who praised the performances, character development, production values and ending.

== Plot ==
Toranaga, Blackthorne, and Mariko arrive at Ajiro. Fuji is assigned the task of serving as Blackthorne's consort, despite her reluctance. Toranaga rallies Yabushige's army, winning them over to chant his name, before leaving for Edo. Blackthorne finds the Erasmus and attempts to sail in a boat with help from Muraji but is stopped. Mariko informs him that his ship has been confiscated and now belongs to Toranaga, and his men have been sent to Edo.

Blackthorne is given a home and provided with servants and a good salary. He starts training Yabushige's army, although he initially struggles due to his lack of wartime experience. He decides to use his maritime knowledge to teach them how to use cannons, impressing Yabushige. Blackthorne also begins to learn more about Japan's culture and slowly learns the language. Ishido's retainer Nebara Jozen arrives and tells Yabushige to return to Osaka and pledge his loyalty to the remaining regents. When Yabushige tries to deviate, Jozen warns him that he will face treason if he refuses. To ease tensions, Yabushige invites Jozen to stay the night and witness a demonstration of the cannons the next day.

Grateful for her services, Blackthorne gives Fuji one of his guns as a token of gratitude, and she gives him her late father's swords. He also goes to swim and has a conversation with Mariko on his life back in England. She later visits him in his room and they have sex, although later she pretends to have hired a courtesan with help from Fuji. At the demonstration, Toranaga's son Nagakado deviates from the plans and leads an ambush on Jozen and his men, using the cannons to kill several of them while also blowing off Jozen's arm and killing his horse. Yabushige protests about this as it will mean an unprovoked declaration of war, but Nagakado tells him to inform Toranaga as his men finish off the survivors. A badly wounded Jozen angrily denounces the use of the cannons and calls Nagakado's actions savage, only for Nagakado to behead him, much to Yabushige's horror. A horrified Mariko says that war is now inevitable.

== Production ==
=== Development ===
In February 2024, Hulu confirmed that the fourth episode of the series would be titled "The Eightfold Fence", and was to be written by Nigel Williams and Emily Yoshida, and directed by Frederick E. O. Toye. It was Williams' first writing credit, Yoshida's first writing credit, and Toye's first directing credit.

The episode is dedicated to the memory of Larry Beckett, the series' technical advisor and cannon expert.

=== Writing ===
The final scene deviates from the original novel. While Blackthorne teaches the army and Nagakado kills Jozen, the novel depicts Blackthorne showing the use of muskets, while the series employ chain shots from the cannons. Justin Marks and Rachel Kondo explained that the change was because it was more historically accurate, as Japan had already been introduced to muskets 50 years prior to the events of the story.

Marks said that Nagakado was in a "tough and not-so-tough position", citing his ambitions in living up to his father's standards, and suggesting he could've ended like Omi had he not been born in his lineage.

== Reception ==
=== Viewers ===
In its original FX broadcast, "The Eightfold Fence" was seen by an estimated 0.517 million household viewers and gained a 0.10 ratings share among adults aged 18–49, according to Nielsen Media Research. This means that 0.10 percent of all households with televisions watched the episode. This was a slight increase in viewership from the previous episode, which was seen by an estimated 0.492 million household viewers and gained a 0.09 ratings share among adults aged 18–49.

=== Critical reviews ===
"The Eightfold Fence" received critical acclaim. The review aggregator website Rotten Tomatoes reported a 100% approval rating for the episode, based on 5 reviews, with an average rating of 8.8/10.

Meredith Hobbs Coons of The A.V. Club gave the episode an "A" and wrote, "We've finally left the confines of Osaka Castle. Now we can get into some really rich stuff. A training montage? Sure, that's in there. Sitting on a wooden deck in the rain drinking tea? That is definitely in there, and that's the freaking dream. And tenderhearted friends, when I say it gets a bit gorier in this fourth episode of Shōgun, I really mean it." Jesse Raub of Vulture gave the episode a 4 star rating out of 5 and wrote, "After three episodes of sword fights, sweeping landscapes, and political maneuvering, Shōgun finally pulls out the missing piece of its historical-epic puzzle: romance. But as with every other element in the show, Shōgun is going to earn its love story."

Sean T. Collins of The New York Times wrote, "Last week's episode dropped the ball when it came to depicting visceral combat. This week's fired it straight at the enemy and pulped them." Josh Rosenberg of Esquire wrote, "Once you get familiar with its characters — and acquire a tepid understanding of feudal Japan's political climate — Shōgun is easily the best drama on television. A little history lesson couldn't hurt anyone now and then."

Johnny Loftus of Decider wrote, "Shōgun Episode 4 comes in like a cannonball. With a shocking, Red Wedding-esque act of gory provocation, balanced against the blossoming of secret love, it now seems clear that no amount of ritual, subtlety, or political gamesmanship will be able to prevent what's coming." Tyler Johnson of TV Fanatic gave the episode a 4.5 star rating out of 5 and wrote, "It's a testament to Rachel Kondo and Justin Marks' talent for establishing tone that while Shogun takes place in a world about which the average viewer knows very little, there's seldom any doubt in the audiences' mind with regard to what's at stake and how we should feel about it."
