= Servants of Two Masters =

- Shōgun episode
- Episode no.: Season 1 Episode 2
- Directed by: Jonathan van Tulleken
- Written by: Rachel Kondo; Justin Marks
- Cinematography by: Christopher Ross
- Editing by: Aika Miyake
- Original release date: February 27, 2024
- Running time: 58 minutes

Guest appearances
- Néstor Carbonell as Vasco Rodrigues; Tokuma Nishioka as Toda "Iron Fist" Hiromatsu; Joaquim de Almeida as Father Domingo; Yukijiro Hotaru as Nakamura Hidetoshi; Shinnosuke Abe as Toda "Buntaro" Hirokatsu; Ayo as Daiyoin / Lady Iyo; Yuki Kura as Yoshii Nagakado; Louis Ferreira as Ferreira; Paulino Nunes as Father Visitor Carlo Dell'Acqua; Hiromoto Ida as Kiyama ukon Sadanaga; Toshi Toda as Sugiyama Josui; Takeshi Kurokawa as Ohno Harunobu; Yoriko Dōguchi as Kiri no Kata; Yuki Takao as Usami Tadayoshi

Episode chronology
← Previous "Anjin"	Next → "Tomorrow Is Tomorrow"

"Servants of Two Masters" (Japanese: 二人の主君に仕えて, Hepburn: Futari no Shukun ni Tsukaete) is the second episode of the American historical drama television series Shōgun, based on the novel by James Clavell. The episode was written by series developers Rachel Kondo and Justin Marks, and directed by co-executive producer Jonathan van Tulleken. It was released on Hulu on February 27, 2024 alongside the first episode, and they also aired on FX on the same day.

The series is set in 1600, and follows three characters. John Blackthorne, a risk-taking English sailor who ends up shipwrecked in Japan, a land whose unfamiliar culture will ultimately redefine him; Lord Toranaga, a shrewd, powerful daimyo, at odds with his own dangerous, political rivals; and Lady Mariko, a woman with invaluable skills but dishonorable family ties, who must prove her value and allegiance. In the episode, Blackthorne explains his beliefs to Toranaga, while conflicts arise in Osaka.

According to Nielsen Media Research, the episode was seen by an estimated 0.764 million household viewers and gained a 0.14 ratings share among adults aged 18–49. The episode received critical acclaim, with critics praising the performances, cinematography and pacing.

== Plot ==
One year prior, the reigning Taikō is dying, surrounded by his family and members of his court. After sending them away, he privately talks with Toranaga, suggesting he could become the sole regent until his young heir, Yaechiyo, comes of age. Toranaga refuses, knowing that this will only make him a target for the Taikō's enemies. Anticipating this response, the Taikō informs him that he is forming a "Council of Regents," which includes Toranaga, to prevent a possible civil war over his succession.

In 1600, Blackthorne is brought before Toranaga and Mariko. They bring Portuguese Father Martin Alvito to translate their conversation, where Blackthorne reveals that England is at war with Portugal over their respective religions. This prompts Ishido to order Blackthorne's arrest, which Toranaga does not prevent to avoid antagonizing the two Catholic regents. In his cell, Blackthorne meets Father Domingo, a Franciscan friar, who informs him that the Portuguese Black Ships are using profits from the silk trade to support a secret military base in Macau, implying that the Jesuits are planning to take power for themselves.

Ishido learns from the Catholic regents Kiyama and Ohno that they will support Toranaga's impeachment if Blackthorne is killed, but he believes that the sailor can be useful for their plans. Yabushige, eager to play both sides, arranges for Blackthorne's prison escort to be ambushed by rōnin before ordering his own samurai to kill the rōnin and "rescue" Blackthorne for Toranaga. With Mariko translating his words, Blackthorne explains that Portugal and Spain have divided the world among themselves and intend to replace all non-Catholic governments, shocking Toranaga.

Realizing his potential, Toranaga decides to let Blackthorne stay with him as a guest. The Jesuits inform Kiyama that Blackthorne's private notes have been retrieved, proving that he was sent to disrupt the silk trade. That night, Toranaga kills a shinobi disguised as one of his servants when she tries to stab Blackthorne in his room. Toranaga explains to his shocked advisors that he had deliberately changed rooms with Blackthorne, proving that the assassin was sent to kill him.

== Production ==
=== Development ===
In January 2024, Hulu confirmed that the second episode of the series would be titled "Servants of Two Masters", and was to be written by series developers Rachel Kondo and Justin Marks, and directed by co-executive producer Jonathan van Tulleken. It was Kondo's second writing credit, Marks' second writing credit, and van Tulleken's second directing credit.

=== Filming ===
For the first meeting scene between Blackthorne and Toranaga, Jonathan van Tulleken said he wanted the scene to feel "very first person" to "get inside both their heads", hoping to build tension in the scene over whether Blackthorne would commit a misstep.

== Reception ==
=== Viewers ===
In its original FX broadcast, "Servants of Two Masters" was seen by an estimated 0.764 million household viewers and gained a 0.14 ratings share among adults aged 18–49, according to Nielsen Media Research. This means that 0.14 percent of all households with televisions watched the episode.

=== Critical reviews ===
"Servants of Two Masters" received critical acclaim. The review aggregator website Rotten Tomatoes reported a 100% approval rating for the episode, based on 4 reviews.

Meredith Hobbs Coons of The A.V. Club gave the episode an "A–" and wrote, "The violence in Shōgun is staggered, but when it shows up, it's staggering. Men with katanas slice heads clean off, characters go on throat slashing sprees, arrows pierce through people in the woods, a guy gets boiled alive. Close your eyes sometimes if you must, but let's all keep watching. This is good stuff."

Jesse Raub of Vulture gave the episode a 3 star rating out of 5 and wrote, "If Shōgun's strength is how subtly it sets up its plot machinations through casual dialogue, as it does in the premiere, then "Servants of Two Masters" is one of the miniseries' weaker episodes." Sean T. Collins of The New York Times wrote, "This is a good thing. A story about an actually noble nobleman, beset by rival houses, in a world where adherence to rigid rules of duty and honor can make the difference between life and death: People kind of like that stuff."

Johnny Loftus of Decider wrote, "In episode two of Shōgun, we learn a great deal more about the dangerous game Lord Toranaga has been forced to play, a game that really began with specific instructions the Taikō left with one of the supreme ruler's few remaining breaths." Tyler Johnson of TV Fanatic gave the episode a 4.5 star rating out of 5 and wrote, "These opening episodes were thrilling beyond measure, and better yet, they concluded with the promise of even higher stakes to come."
