= Wife & Dog =

- Directed by: Guy Ritchie
- Written by: Guy Ritchie
- Produced by: Guy Ritchie; Ivan Atkinson; John Friedberg
- Starring: Benedict Cumberbatch; Rosamund Pike; Cosmo Jarvis; James Norton; Paddy Considine; Anthony Hopkins
- Cinematography: Ed Wild
- Edited by: James Herbert
- Music by: Christopher Benstead
- Production companies: Black Bear Pictures; Toff Guy Films
- Distributed by: Black Bear Pictures
- Release date: February 19, 2027
- Countries: United States; United Kingdom
- Language: English

Wife & Dog is an upcoming action thriller film written and directed by Guy Ritchie. The film is produced by Black Bear Pictures.

The film is scheduled to be released on February 19, 2027.

== Cast ==
- Benedict Cumberbatch
- Rosamund Pike
- Anthony Hopkins
- Cosmo Jarvis
- James Norton
- Paddy Considine
- Pip Torrens

== Production ==
Wife and Dog was written by Guy Ritchie, and going into the May 2024 Cannes Film Market, Black Bear was handling sales of the film. Ritchie would also direct and produce the film with Ivan Atkinson and John Friedberg. In November, Benedict Cumberbatch, Rosamund Pike and Anthony Hopkins joined the cast. Cosmo Jarvis, James Norton, Paddy Considine and Pip Torrens would be added to the cast in January 2025.

Principal photography began in February 2025, in the United Kingdom.

== Release ==
Wife & Dog is scheduled to be released on February 19, 2027, by Black Bear Pictures. It was originally scheduled to be released on October 23, 2026.
