= Funny Face (2020 film) =

- Official poster
- Directed by: Tim Sutton
- Written by: Tim Sutton
- Produced by: Alexandra Byer; Andrew Morrison; Madeline Askwith
- Starring: Cosmo Jarvis; Dela Meskienyar; Jonny Lee Miller; Dan Hedaya; Rhea Perlman
- Cinematography: Lucas Gath
- Edited by: Kate Abernathy
- Music by: Phil Mossman
- Production companies: Yellow Bear Films; Rathaus Films
- Distributed by: Gravitas Ventures
- Release dates: February 23, 2020 (Berlinale); March 30, 2021 (United States)
- Running time: 93 minutes
- Country: United States
- Language: English

Funny Face is a 2020 American drama film, written and directed by Tim Sutton. It stars Cosmo Jarvis, Dela Meskienyar, Jonny Lee Miller, Dan Hedaya and Rhea Perlman.

The film had its world premiere at the Berlin International Film Festival on February 23, 2020. It was released on March 30, 2021, by Gravitas Ventures.

== Plot ==
The destruction of a young man's grandparents' home leads him to take revenge under a masked persona.

== Cast ==
- Cosmo Jarvis as Saul
- Dela Meskienyar as Zama
- Jonny Lee Miller as Developer
- Dan Hedaya as Benj
- Rhea Perlman as Fernie
- Victor Garber as Developer's Father
- Jeremy Bobb as American Suit
- Ramsey Faragallah
- Heather Raffo

== Release ==
The film had its world premiere at the Berlin International Film Festival on February 23, 2020. It was released on March 30, 2021, by Gravitas Ventures.

== Reception ==
Funny Face received positive reviews from film critics. It holds a 73% approval rating on review aggregator website Rotten Tomatoes, based on 15 reviews, with an average of 6.6/10. On Metacritic, the film holds a rating of 61 out of 100, based on 9 critics, indicating "generally favorable" reviews.
