= Nocturnal (2019 film) =

- Film poster
- Directed by: Nathalie Biancheri
- Screenplay by: Olivia Waring; Nathalie Biancheri
- Story by: Olivia Waring
- Produced by: Colin Michael Day; Coco Marie Schneider
- Starring: Cosmo Jarvis; Lauren Coe; Sadie Frost
- Cinematography: Michał Dymek
- Edited by: Andonis Trattos
- Music by: Aaron Cupples
- Production company: Rickshaw Entertainment
- Distributed by: Urban Distribution International
- Release date: 8 October 2019 (London Film Festival)
- Running time: 84 minutes
- Country: United Kingdom
- Language: English

Nocturnal is a 2019 British drama film directed by Nathalie Biancheri, who co-wrote it with Olivia Waring. It stars Cosmo Jarvis, Lauren Coe, and Sadie Frost, and premiered at the London Film Festival in October 2019. As the film's title suggests, Nocturnal takes place largely in the evenings and at night, which the two protagonists Laurie and Pete spend together.

== Plot summary ==
Young Laurie has returned to her native Yorkshire after a childhood in Ireland with her single mother. A cold welcome from her classmates at the new high school leads to Laurie's withdrawal, and she escapes into intensive athletics training. She soon becomes aware of Pete, who works as a handyman at the school, carrying out renovations, and is in the process of breaking up with his girlfriend. The two outsiders quickly become friends and spend more and more time together, including evenings with beers and walks on the beach. But there are some things Pete doesn't want to talk about.

== Production ==
Italian director Nathalie Biancheri, who also co-wrote the screenplay with Olivia Waring, made her feature film directorial debut with Nocturnal.

British actor and singer-songwriter Cosmo Jarvis and actress Lauren Coe star as Pete and Laurie. Other roles include Sadie Frost as Jean, Laurie Kynaston as Danny, Yasmin Monet Prince as Annie, Amber Jean Rowan as Jade, and Ella-Grace Gregoire as Ruby.

Filming took place over 17 days in Yorkshire, the film's setting. Michał Dymek served as cinematographer.

The film premiered on 8 October 2019 at the London Film Festival. A first trailer was unveiled shortly beforehand. It premiered online at the Galway Film Fleadh on 8 July 2020. The film was also screened at the ArteKino Festival in December 2021.

== Reception ==
=== Critical reception ===
Of the reviews listed on Rotten Tomatoes, 94 percent are positive.

Fabien Lemercier of the film magazine Cineuropa wrote that Nocturnal "demonstrates the many qualities of a director who knows how to" hold a team together, making good use of Polish cinematographer Michal Dymek, with highly evocative music by Australian Aaron Cupples.

=== Awards (selection) ===
- London Critics Circle Film Awards 2021
  - Nomination for Best British Actor (Cosmo Jarvis, also for Shadow of Violence)
- Sofia International Film Festival 2020
  - Special Jury Award (Nathalie Biancheri)
