= Young Stalin =

Upcoming film by Géla Babluani

- Directed by: Géla Babluani
- Screenplay by: Simon Sebag Montefiore; Géla Babluani
- Based on: Young Stalin by Simon Sebag Montefiore
- Produced by: Sam Taylor; Archil Gelovani; Vladimer Katcharava; Alexander Kushaev; Rupert Lloyd; Gunda Bergman; Esko Rips
- Starring: Cosmo Jarvis
- Cinematography: Vladislav Opeylants
- Production companies: Independent Film Project; Film and Music Entertainment; 20 Steps Productions
- Countries: Georgia; United Kingdom
- Language: English
- Budget: US$10 million

Young Stalin is an upcoming biographical film directed by Géla Babluani and starring Cosmo Jarvis as a young Joseph Stalin adapted from the 2007 non-fiction book of the same name by Simon Sebag Montefiore.

== Cast ==
- Cosmo Jarvis as Joseph Stalin

== Production ==
Young Stalin was directed by Géla Babluani, with Cosmo Jarvis in the lead role as young Joseph Stalin. Babluani co-wrote the screenplay with Simon Sebag Montefiore who wrote the book of the same name from which it is adapted. It was produced by Archil Gelovani's Georgian-based banner Independent Film Project (IFP), Film and Music Entertainment's Sam Tayor, Vladimer Katcharava of 20 Steps, alongside Alexander Kushaev, Rupert Lloyd, Gunda Bergman and Esko Rips. Financing was provided by Access Entertainment, AI Film and Monte Rosso Productions.

On a budget of US$10 million, principal photography began on 25 July 2025 in Tbilisi, Georgia. Filming also took place in Bucharest, Romania.
