= Wolf (2021 Irish-Polish film) =

2021 Irish-Polish drama film

- US theatrical release poster
- Directed by: Nathalie Biancheri
- Written by: Nathalie Biancheri
- Produced by: Jessie Fisk; Nathalie Biancheri
- Starring: George MacKay; Lily-Rose Depp; Paddy Considine; Eileen Walsh; Fionn O'Shea; Lola Petticrew
- Cinematography: Michał Dymek
- Music by: Stefan Wesołowski
- Production companies: Feline Films; Lava Films; Polish Film Institute; Screen Ireland; Eurimages
- Distributed by: Focus Features; Universal Pictures
- Release dates: 17 September 2021 (TIFF); 3 December 2021 (United States)
- Running time: 98 minutes
- Countries: Republic of Ireland; Poland
- Language: English
- Box office: $565,825

Wolf is a 2021 psychological drama film written and directed by Nathalie Biancheri. An international co-production of Ireland and Poland, it stars George MacKay, Lily-Rose Depp, Paddy Considine, Eileen Walsh, Fionn O'Shea and Lola Petticrew.

Wolf had its world premiere at the 2021 Toronto International Film Festival on September 17, 2021. It had a limited theatre release in the United States on December 3, 2021, by Focus Features. The film received mixed reviews from critics who praised the performances of MacKay, Depp, and Considine, but criticized Biancheri's script and direction.

== Plot ==
The teen Jacob, who suffers from clinical lycanthropy believing he is a wolf, is committed to a mental asylum following an attack on his brother. There he meets and befriends the other patients, who also believe themselves to be animals, including Rufus, who believes he is a German Shepherd. Others introduce themselves, one as a parrot, another as a squirrel, then a horse, a duck and a spider.

As Rufus also identifies as canine, he insists he and Jacob are kindred spirits, as they are meant to be pack animals. He explains they must follow the rules and obey the asylum's employees.

They are inundated with images and videos of correct human behavior. Then outside, put on leashes, Jacob and Rufus watch as Jeremy the squirrel is humiliated by Dr. Mann, the Zookeeper, who forces him to try to climb a tree, but rips off a fingernail in the process.

Left alone with the vicious, sociopathic and mentally unstable head of the asylum the Zookeeper, Jacob is told to attack him, as he had done on the outside to someone, resulting in being committed here. Although he does get on his hands and knees as ordered, he resists doing so. As they are meant to write in journals, Dr. Mann has Jacob's read out loud to shame and convince him he is human.

That evening, Jacob forms a close bond with Cecile, an enigmatic patient/seemingly foster child of Dr. Angeli nicknamed "Wildcat", and together they roam the hallways at night. After a local attacks the compound, throwing a dead dog through a window and calling them freaks, the two gently bury the carcass.

After witnessing the brutal methods of treatment performed by the Zookeeper, such as scaring the 'parrot' into admitting she is human by almost pushing her out a high window to prove she can fly, Jacob becomes frustrated. When he attacks an orderly for antagonising the 'duck', it results in a warning.

The Zookeeper tries to scare Jacob into compliance, first by introducing him to a live wolf so he can recognise their differences, then to a 'lion' man. He had been subjected to a survival cannibalism situation, resulting in his inability to reintegrate into society, so he is caged here permanently.

Caught on the grounds at night by the Zookeeper, Jacob attacks him. So, he is caged and gagged. Cecile sneaks into the room where he is caged one night and makes love to him. However, they are caught by Dr Angeli so Jacob is punished with a cattle prod, the other patients hear, so lash out at the Zookeeper.

Disgusted by Zookeeper and Angeli, Cecile frees Jacob from his cage, allowing him to escape. She almost runs away with him, then tries to convince him to stay. Not wanting to be controlled any longer, Jacob runs into the forest where he can live in freedom as a wolf.

== Cast ==
- George MacKay as Jacob (Wolf)
- Lily-Rose Depp as Cecile (Wildcat)
- Paddy Considine as Dr. Mann (Zookeeper)
- Eileen Walsh as Dr. Angeli
- Fionn O'Shea as Rufus (German Shepherd)
- Lola Petticrew as Judith (Parrot)
- Karise Yansen as Annalisa (Panda)
- Darragh Shannon as Jeremy (Squirrel)
- Senan Jennings as Ivan (Duck)

== Production ==
In February 2020, it was announced George MacKay and Lily-Rose Depp had joined the cast of the film, with Nathalie Biancheri directing from a screenplay she wrote. In September 2020, Paddy Considine, Eileen Walsh, Fionn O'Shea, Lola Petticrew and Senan Jennings joined the cast of the film.

Principal photography began in August 2020. Production was initially set to begin in April 2020, but was delayed due to the COVID-19 pandemic. Principal photography ended by October 2020.

== Release ==
Focus Features acquired distribution rights excluding Russia, Turkey, Taiwan and the Middle East to the film in October 2020. The film had a theatrical release in the U.S. on 3 December 2021, after premiering at the Toronto International Film Festival on 17 September 2021 as the entry for Ireland.

== Reception ==
=== Box office ===
In the United States and Canada, the film earned $82,640 from 308 theaters in its opening weekend and $15,160 in its second before ending its theatrical run.

=== Critical response ===
On the review aggregator website Rotten Tomatoes, 45% of 74 critics' reviews are positive, with an average rating of 5.3/10. The website's consensus reads: "Despite George MacKay's best efforts, Wolf remains a horror-tinged social allegory that's left to largely chase its own tail." On Metacritic, which uses a weighted average, the film has a score of 52 based on 15 reviews, indicating "mixed or average reviews".
