= Andrew Morrison (filmmaker) =

American film producer

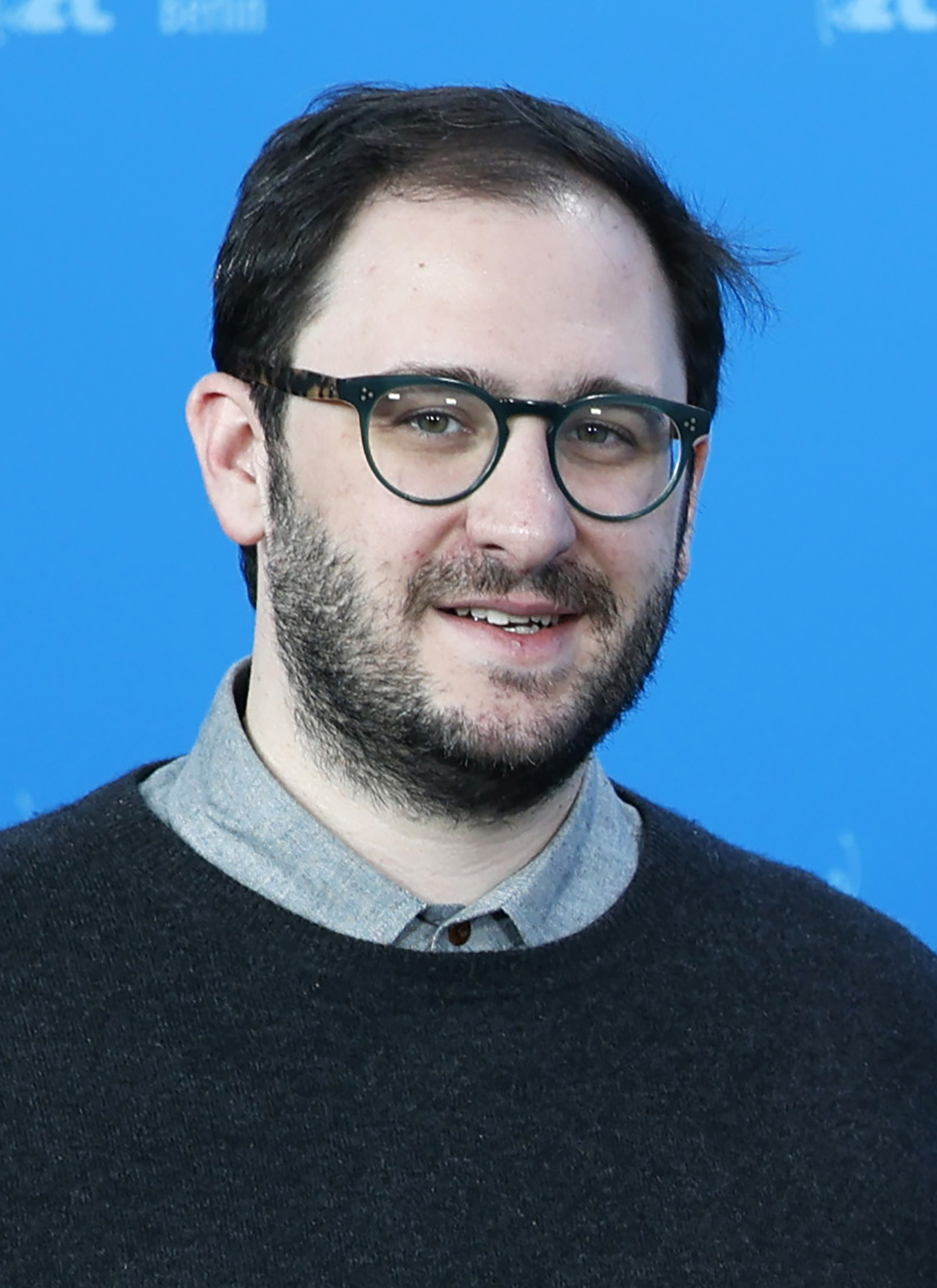
- Morrison in 2026
- Education: Georgetown University (BA)
- Occupation: Film producer
- Years active: 2014–present
- Organization: Kaplan Morrison
- Notable work: The Brutalist
- Awards: Golden Globe Award for Best Motion Picture — Drama 2024

Andrew Morrison is an American film producer best known for producing The Brutalist, for which he was nominated for the Academy Award for Best Picture at the 97th Academy Awards. With David Kaplan, he is a founder of the film production company Kaplan Morrison. His other credits include The Testament of Ann Lee, The World to Come and Funny Face.

== Education and early career ==
Morrison attended Georgetown University where he began making short films, successfully placing one at multiple festivals and gaining a wide audience. In anticipation of a career in the entertainment industry, Morrison completed an industry internship with comedian and fellow Georgetown alumnus Mike Birbiglia. Morrison says attending the Sundance Film Festival as a college senior gave him the platform to land his first feature film credit on Thirst Street shortly after graduating in 2015.

== Filmography ==
Producer

- Funny Face (2020)
- The Brutalist (2024)
- The Testament of Ann Lee (2025)
- Triumph of the Will (TBA)
- The Origin of the World (TBA)

Executive producer

- Thirst Street (2017)
- The World to Come (2020)
- Totally Under Control (2020)

== Accolades ==
Year	Award	Film	Result
2024	Academy Award for Best Picture	The Brutalist	Nominated
2024	Golden Globe Award for Best Motion Picture – Drama	The Brutalist	Won

As a producer on The Brutalist, Andrew Morrison shared the Golden Globe Award for Best Motion Picture – Drama, in addition to the nomination for Best Picture at the Oscars. Both awards recognize the producers of the film as accredited by the Producers Guild of America.
