= Is the World Strange or Am I Strange? =

Studio album by Cosmo Jarvis
- Released: 26 September 2011
- Genre: Alternative, Indie Rock
- Label: 25th Frame Productions

Singles from Is The World Strange or Am I Strange?
- 1. "Gay Pirates" Released: 2011; 2. "Sure as Hell Not Jesus" Released: 2011; 3. "My Day" Released: 2011; 4. "She Doesn't Mind" Released: 2011

Is the World Strange or Am I Strange? is the second album by English singer-songwriter Cosmo Jarvis. It was released on 26 September 2011. Four songs from the album have been released as singles: "Gay Pirates", "Sure as Hell Not Jesus", "My Day" and "She Doesn't Mind".

== Track listing ==
Is The World Strange Or Am I Strange?
No.	Title	Writer(s)	Producer(s)	Length
1.	"Gay Pirates"	Cosmo Jarvis	Cosmo Jarvis	5:52
2.	"Sure As Hell Not Jesus"	Cosmo Jarvis	Cosmo Jarvis	5:04
3.	"Blame It On Me"	Cosmo Jarvis	Cosmo Jarvis	3:55
4.	"Is The World Strange?"	Cosmo Jarvis	Cosmo Jarvis	8:28
5.	"Dave's House"	Cosmo Jarvis	Cosmo Jarvis	5:12
6.	"Let Me Out Of My Head"	Cosmo Jarvis	Cosmo Jarvis	6:07
7.	"We Just Wanna Talk"	Cosmo Jarvis	Cosmo Jarvis	7:11
8.	"She Doesn't Mind"	Cosmo Jarvis	Cosmo Jarvis	5:10
9.	"The Wave That Made Them Happy"	Cosmo Jarvis	Cosmo Jarvis	4:42
10.	"Girl In The French Film (Exclusive Track)"	Cosmo Jarvis	Cosmo Jarvis	3:52
11.	"My Day"	Cosmo Jarvis	Cosmo Jarvis	8:13
12.	"Betty"	Cosmo Jarvis	Cosmo Jarvis	10:29
