= My Friend the Polish Girl =

- Directed by: Ewa Banaszkiewicz; Mateusz Dymek
- Screenplay by: Ewa Banaszkiewicz; Mateusz Dymek
- Produced by: Ewa Banaszkiewicz; Mateusz Dymek; Sebastian Petryk
- Starring: Aneta Piotrowska; Emma Friedman-Cohen; Daniel Barry; Andy Abbott; Darren Rose; Max Davis
- Cinematography: Michał Dymek
- Edited by: Matylda Dymek; Mateusz Dymek
- Music by: Tara Creme
- Production company: Warsaw Pact Films
- Distributed by: Republic Film Distribution (UK); Subliminal Films (USA); Aurora (Poland)
- Release dates: January 29, 2018 (Rotterdam); July 19, 2019 (United Kingdom)
- Running time: 87 minutes
- Countries: United Kingdom; Poland
- Language: English

My Friend the Polish Girl is a UK/Polish pseudo-documentary drama feature film written, directed, and co-produced by Ewa Banaszkiewicz and Mateusz Dymek. Starring Aneta Piotrowska, Emma Friedman-Cohen, Daniel Barry, Andy Abbot, Darren Rose, and Max Davis, it premiered in competition at the 2018 International Film Festival Rotterdam.

== Plot ==
Katie, a young American documentarian, sets out to make a film about immigrants in post-Brexit-vote London, but ends up intruding on the life of Alicja, a struggling Polish actress. With confrontational questions, she tries to force intimacy and drives a wedge between Alicja and her boyfriend Michael. Alicja earns a pittance as an assistant in a cinema and is trying to get work as an actress while she becomes engrossed in the film. This documentary soon becomes the report of a questionable game in which the two women challenge each other.

== Cast ==
- Aneta Piotrowska as Alicja
- Emma Friedman-Cohen as Katie
- Daniel Barry as Michael
- Andy Abbott as Alex
- Daren Rose as Uncle Mike
- Max Davis as Max

== Release ==
The film had a cinema release in the UK on July 19, 2019 by Republic Distribution and later on November 29, 2019 in the USA by Subliminal Films.

== Reception ==
My friend the Polish Girl holds a 77% approval rating on review aggregator website Rotten Tomatoes based on 13 critic's reviews with an average rating of 5.7/10. Jeannette Catsoulis for The New York Times wrote, “Shot mostly in black and white and with an improvisational feel, ‘My Friend the Polish Girl’ is cool and clever, feigning social realism with winking calculation.” While Guy Lodge of Variety: “From its cramped, off-the-cuff shooting style (mostly in washed-out monochrome) to its persuasive ensemble, ‘My Friend the Polish Girl’ mostly pulls off the documentary pretense with wily skill.” Peter Bradshaw from The Guardian nominated the lead Aneta Piotrowska as one of the top female performances of 2019.

== Awards ==
Nominated for Best British Feature Film at the Edinburgh International Film Festival in 2018. My Friend the Polish Girl won the Grand Prix at Mlodzi & Film Debut festival in 2019.
