= Christopher Ross (cinematographer) =

British cinematographer

- Born: 1976 (age 49–50); Wandsworth, London, England
- Education: University of Nottingham
- Occupation: Cinematographer
- Years active: 2004–present

Christopher Ross, B.S.C. (born 1976), is a British cinematographer and the current president of the British Society of Cinematographers.

== Filmography ==
=== Feature film ===
Year	Title	Director	Notes
2006	London to Brighton	Paul Andrew Williams	
2007	Deadmeat	Q	With Damian Paul Daniel
2008	The Cottage	Paul Andrew Williams	
2008	Cass	Jon S. Baird	
2008	Eden Lake	James Watkins	
2009	Malice in Wonderland	Simon Fellows	
2010	Sex & Drugs & Rock & Roll	Mat Whitecross	With Brian Tufano
2011	Flutter	Giles Borg	
2012	Spike Island	Mat Whitecross	
2012	Ashes	Mat Whitecross	
2014	Monsters: Dark Continent	Tom Green	
2014	Get Santa	Christopher Smith	
2014	Black Sea	Kevin Macdonald	
2016	Dad's Army	Oliver Parker	
2016	Detour	Christopher Smith	
2017	The Sense of an Ending	Ritesh Batra	
2018	Terminal	Vaughn Stein	
2019	Yesterday	Danny Boyle	
2019	Cats	Tom Hooper	
2021	Everybody's Talking About Jamie	Jonathan Butterell	
2022	The Swimmers	Sally El Hosaini	
2023	The Great Escaper	Oliver Parker	
2025	Dead of Winter	Brian Kirk	

Documentary film

Year	Title	Director	Notes
2019	Good Hope	Anthony Fabian	With Charl Fraser

=== Television ===
Miniseries

Year	Title	Director	Notes
2009	Collision	Marc Evans	
2012	Blackout	Tom Green	
2018	Hard Sun	Brian Kirk	2 episodes
2026	VisionQuest	Christopher J. Byrne	Episodes "No Strings" and "Theseus"

TV series

Year	Title	Director	Notes
2009-2010	Misfits	Tom Green; Tom Harper	Season 1
2013	Youngers	Anthony Philipson	Season 1
2013	Top Boy	Jonathan van Tulleken	Season 2
2015	Fortitude	Nick Hurran	Episode 10 (Season 1)
2018	Trust	Danny Boyle; Jonathan van Tulleken; Susanna White	7 episodes
2024	Shōgun	Jonathan van Tulleken	Episodes "Anjin" and "Servants of Two Masters"
2024	The Day of the Jackal	Brian Kirk	3 episodes
2025	The Agency	Neil Burger	Episodes "The Rubicon" and "Overtaken By Events"
2027	Tomb Raider	Jonathan van Tulleken	Episode "Pilot"

TV movies

Year	Title	Director
2011	United	James Strong
2011	The Borrowers	Tom Harper
2017	Oasis	Kevin Macdonald

== Awards and nominations ==
Year	Award	Category	Title	Result
2024	American Society of Cinematographers	Outstanding Achievement in Cinematography in a Television Series	Shōgun (For episode "Anjin")	Nominated
2012	British Society of Cinematographers	Best Cinematography in a Television Drama	Blackout	Won
2013	British Society of Cinematographers	Best Cinematography in a Television Drama	Top Boy	Nominated
2024	British Society of Cinematographers	Best Cinematography in a Television Drama	Shōgun (For episode "Ajin")	Nominated
2024	Camerimage	Golden Frog	Shōgun (For episode "Ajin")	Nominated
2024	Primetime Emmy Awards	Outstanding Cinematography for a Series (One Hour)	Shōgun (For episode "Ajin")	Nominated
2025	British Academy Television Craft Awards	Photography & Lighting: Fiction	Shōgun	Won
