= Humasyouhitch/Sonofabitch =

Studio album by Cosmo Jarvis
- Released: 16 November 2009
- Recorded: 2009
- Genre: Alternative, indie rock
- Length: 82.06
- Label: Wall of Sound

Cosmo Jarvis chronology
Humasyouhitch/Sonofabitch (2009)	Untitled (2010)

Singles from Humasyouhitch/Sonofabitch
- 1. "She's Got You" Released: 6 September 2009; 2. "Problems/You Got Your Head" Released: 1 November 2009; 3. "Crazy Screwed Up Lady" Released: 21 March 2010

Professional ratings
Review scores
Source	Rating
Q Magazine	3/5 stars
TheSkinny	4/5 stars
Daily Mirror	5/5 stars
The Music Mix	(8/10)
MOJO Magazine	4/5 stars
indieLONDON	4/5 stars

Humasyouhitch/SonOfaBitch is the debut studio album by English singer-songwriter Cosmo Jarvis, released on 16 November 2009. The album's first single "She's Got You" was released on 6 September 2009. Following this, "Problems" and "You Got Your Head" were both released on 1 November 2009.

== Track listing ==
Humasyouhitch
No.	Title	Writer(s)	Producer(s)	Length
1.	"You Got Your Head"	Cosmo Jarvis	Cosmo Jarvis	4:13
2.	"Mel's Song"	Cosmo Jarvis	Cosmo Jarvis	3:25
3.	"She's Got You"	Cosmo Jarvis	Cosmo Jarvis	3:44
4.	"Maxine"	Cosmo Jarvis	Kevin Fletcher	4:10
5.	"Wild Humans"	Cosmo Jarvis	Kevin Fletcher	3:46
6.	"Jessica Alba's Number"	Cosmo Jarvis	Tim Lowe	4:10
7.	"Get Happy"	Cosmo Jarvis	Cosmo Jarvis	3:39
8.	"Kate Was Ere"	Cosmo Jarvis	Cosmo Jarvis	4:07
9.	"Crazy Screwed Up Lady"	Cosmo Jarvis	Cosmo Jarvis	3:52

Sonofabitch
No.	Title	Writer(s)	Producer(s)	Length
10.	"Clean My Room"	Cosmo Jarvis	Cosmo Jarvis	5:10
11.	"Mummy's Been Drinking"	Cosmo Jarvis	Cosmo Jarvis	4:48
12.	"Gone Like You"	Cosmo Jarvis	Cosmo Jarvis	4:44
13.	"Sunshine and Dandelions"	Cosmo Jarvis	Cosmo Jarvis	5:14
14.	"Problems"	Cosmo Jarvis	Cosmo Jarvis	5:28
15.	"Sort Yourself Out"	Cosmo Jarvis	Cosmo Jarvis	3:59
16.	"He Only Goes Out On Tuesdays"	Cosmo Jarvis	Cosmo Jarvis	6:46
17.	"The Royal F**k Up"	Cosmo Jarvis	Cosmo Jarvis	5:56
18.	"Lonely Stroll"	Cosmo Jarvis	Cosmo Jarvis	4:09

iTunes Deluxe Edition
No.	Title	Writer(s)	Length
19.	"Lovely and Dad's Dead"	Cosmo Jarvis	3:12
20.	"Shag Me I'm Single"	Cosmo Jarvis	1:34
