= Alexander Kushaev =

Russian film producer

- Born: Russian: Алекса́ндр Нарима́нович Куша́ев; 8 March 1973 (age 52); Moscow, USSR
- Occupations: television producer, film producer
- Years active: from 1996 to date

Alexander Kushaev (born 8 March 1973 in Moscow, USSR) is a Russian film producer.

== Biography ==
Aleksandr Kushaev was born in Moscow on 8 March 1973. He started his career on television in 1996 as the correspondent of The Business Russia TV show on the RTR channel. Since 1997, he has worked as author and director of TV shows at Russia-1 (ex-RTR), NTV, and TV Centre. In 1998, he graduated from the High Courses for Scriptwriters and Film Directors as the director of documentary films.

From 1998 to 2019, Kushaev held senior positions at Film Broadcasting Service at Russia-1 channel, the flagship channel of All-Russia State Television and Radio Broadcasting Company (VGTRK). In 2012, he took part in the launch of the Russian Novel cable channel for VGTRK and became its senior producer. From 2015 till 2019, he was the Senior Producer of the Film Broadcasting Service of Russia-1 channel. In 2018, Kushaev was the jury member at the selection round of the International Emmy Awards.

== Filmography ==
Kushaev participated in the creation of over 500 films and TV projects. His filmography includes Serf, The Last Warrior, The Last Warrior 3, Tale in the Darkness, How I Ended This Summer, A Long and Happy Life, Living, The Painted Bird, Zuleikha Opens Her Eyes, The Bloody Lady, and Ekaterina. Some of the films and TV series above became notable box office successes.

- Young Stalin (2026)
- Pigeon's Milk (2021)
- The Last Warrior: Root of Evil (2021)
- Death of a ladies man (2020)
- Enemy Lines (2020)
- Deeper! (2020)
- Zuleikha Opens Her Eyes (2020)
- Ekaterina. Season 3: Catherine. Impostors (2019)
- The Painted Bird (2019)
- Serf (2019)
- The Others (TV series, 2018)
- Moscow Greyhound 2 (TV series, 2018–present)
- Super Bobrovs 2 (2018)
- Beryozka (TV Series, 2018)
- The Factory (2018)
- On Edge (TV series, 2018–present)
- The Blood Lady (TV series, 2017)
- Torgsin (miniseries, 2017)
- Kitchen. The Last Battle (2017)
- The Last Warrior (2017)
- Black Cat (TV series, 2016)
- Small-Time Traders (TV series, 2016–2018)
- The Money (TV series, 2016)
- Super Bobrovs (2016)
- Moscow Greyhound (TV series, 2015—2017)
- The Family of Maniac Belyaev (miniseries, 2014)
- Father Mathew (TV series, 2014)
- A Year in Tuscany (TV series, 2014–present)
- Rag Union (2014)
- A Beautiful Life (TV series, 2014)
- Pretty Karina (Tv series, 2013–present)
- Without a Trace (TV series, 2012)
- A Long and Happy Life (2012)
- Sklifosovskiy (TV series, 2012–present)
- Living (2011)
- How I Ended This Summer (2010)
- Tale in the Darkness (2009)
- Lyubka (2009)
- Aurora (2006)

== Awards and nominations ==
- 2011 — Order of Friendship (for the significant contribution to the development of domestic television broadcasting)

=== Awards received by Kushaev's films ===
Year	Award	Title	Result
2020	The Association of Cinema and TV Producers The Best Feature Film Award	Serf	Nominated
2020	Czech Lion Award for the Best Film	The Painted Bird	Won
2019	Venezia Classici UNICEF Award	The Painted Bird	Won
2019	Golden Eagle Award for The Best TV Film/Series	Staying Alive	Nominated
2018	Golden Eagle Award for the Best Television Series (over ten episodes)	Torgsin	Nominated
2017	TEFI Award for The Best Daytime TV Series	Father Mathew	Nominated
2016	The White Elephant Award For The Best Debut	Rag Union	Nominated
2014	Nika Award for the Best Film	A Long and Happy Life	Nominated
2014	Golden Eagle Award for the Best Television Series (over ten episodes)	Sklifosovsky	Nominated
2013	Chicago International Film Festival Special Award	A Long and Happy Life	Won
2013	The White Elephant Award for The Best Film	Living	Nominated
2011	Golden Eagle Award for the Best Feature Film	How I Ended This Summer	Won
2011	Nika Award for The Best Film	How I Ended This Summer	Nominated
2010	London Film Festival Award FOr The Best Film	How I Ended This Summer	Won

== Links ==
- Alexander Kushaev at IMDb
