= Cosmo Jarvis =

British actor (born 1989)

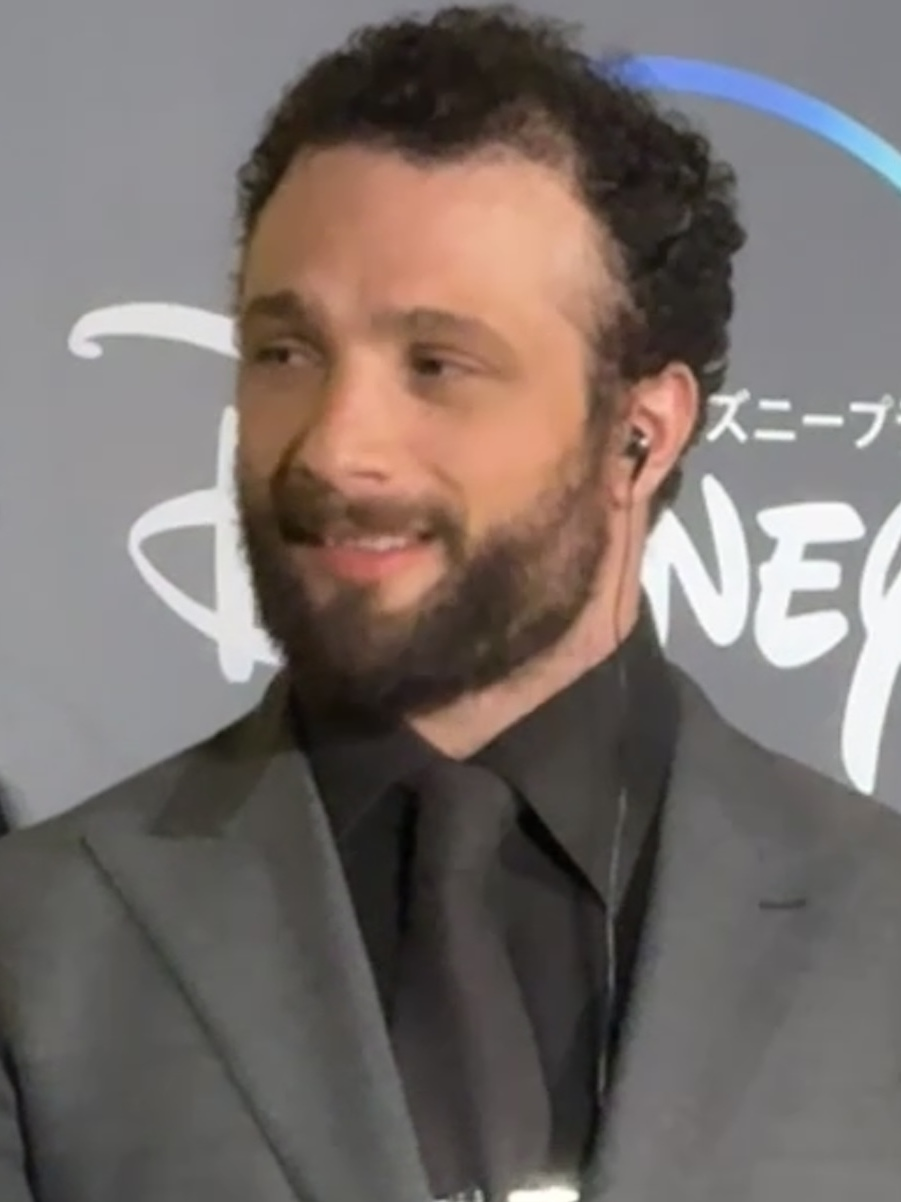
- Jarvis in 2024
- Born: Harrison Cosmo Krikoryan-Jarvis; 1989/1990 (age 36–37); New Jersey, United States
- Citizenship: British; American
- Occupation: Actor
- Years active: 2010–present
- Children: 1

Harrison Cosmo Krikoryan-Jarvis (born 1989 or 1990) is a British actor and former singer-songwriter. He has starred in the films Lady Macbeth (2016), Calm with Horses (2019), Persuasion (2022), and Warfare (2025). In 2024, he portrayed John Blackthorne in the historical drama series Shōgun.

== Early life and education ==
Harrison Cosmo Krikoryan-Jarvis was born in 1989 or 1990 in New Jersey, U.S., to an Armenian-American mother and British father. His grandparents were Armenian immigrants. He moved to Britain with his parents at the age of three months, and moved to Totnes, Devon, as a child, with his mother and younger brother. About his nationality, Jarvis has said: "I came here [Britain] when I was a baby. I've never lived [in America] ... I don't feel a connection to anywhere."

== Music career ==
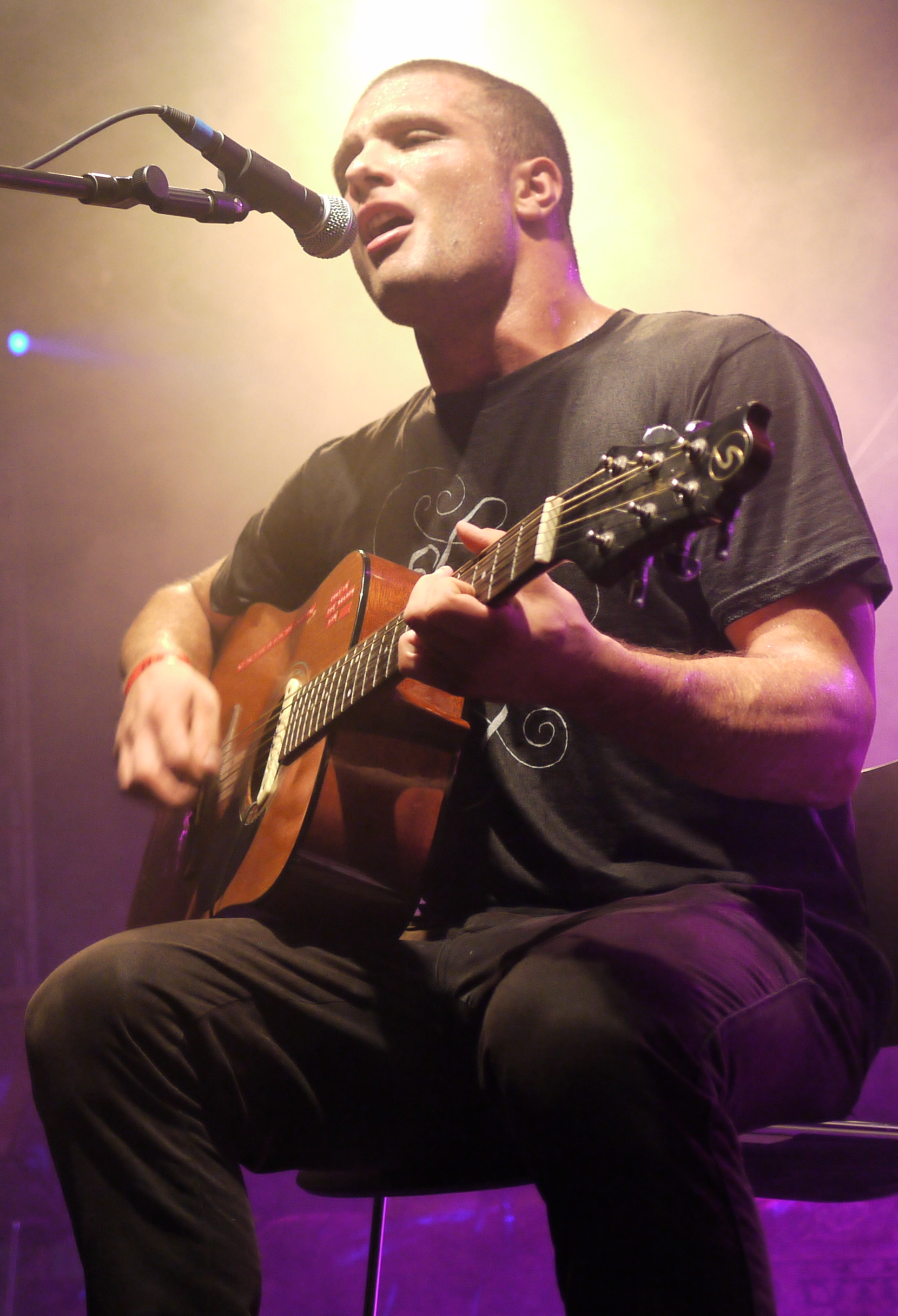
Jarvis in 2013

Jarvis confirmed his second album's title as Is the World Strange or Am I Strange? on his official Facebook page. The first single released from the album was "Gay Pirates", which was released on 23 January 2011. The single's music video was directed by Jarvis. The song was featured as Record of the Day and AOL's Spinner video of the day. "Gay Pirates" was voted number 85 on the Triple J Hottest 100 of 2011, which aired on Australia Day in 2012. The album itself was given an 8.5/10 rating from Soundblab album reviews. He announced in an interview with TNC that he had begun work on his first feature film, called The Naughty Room.

The film premiered on BBC Four on 20 August 2012, shortly after the release of Jarvis' third studio album, titled Think Bigger, the film includes multiple songs/variations of songs from the album in the soundtrack. He toured the UK in late 2012 supporting Mad Dog Mcrea, for whom he penned the song "Waiting on the Hill". The comedy film Hawk(e): The Movie (2013) features several songs by Jarvis. In January 2013, "Love This" came in at number 59 on the Triple J Hottest 100, 2012. On 20 November 2020, Jarvis re-released his 2012 album Think Bigger as Think Bigger - (2020 Deluxe Edition), as the 2012 album was never fully released globally. The Think Bigger reissue contains all of its 11 original recordings remastered for 2020, plus a further nine bonus tracks from that same writing period, including five never before heard songs and four acoustic live 'bedroom' versions of key Think Bigger tracks. Jarvis confirmed in 2025 that he is no longer active as a musician.

== Acting career ==
In 2015, Jarvis auditioned and was cast to portray the character of Sebastian in William Oldroyd's debut feature film Lady Macbeth. Jarvis has starred in two stage plays directed by Richard Jones, the 2017 production of The Hairy Ape by Eugene O'Neill at Park Avenue Armory in New York and The Twilight Zone at the Almeida Theatre in London.

In 2019, his portrayal of Arm in the independent film Calm with Horses earned him a nomination as Best Actor at the British Independent Film Awards 2020 and London Film Critics' Circle. Adapted from the short story of the same name from the collection Young Skins by Colin Barrett, Calm with Horses was received positively, with critics praising both Nick Rowland's work as a debut director and Jarvis' performance as Douglas Armstrong. The film was released in the United States under the title The Shadow of Violence. In 2020, Jarvis was a guest star on the fifth season of Peaky Blinders, as the character Barney. Following Peaky Blinders, Jarvis appeared in Nocturnal, Funny Face, The Evening Hour and Raised by Wolves.

In 2021, Jarvis was announced to star opposite Dakota Johnson in Netflix's adaptation of Jane Austen's Persuasion. He was also cast as John Blackthorne, a leading role opposite Hiroyuki Sanada in FX's 2024 limited-series Shōgun, the second TV adaptation of James Clavell's best-selling novel of the same name. In 2022, Jarvis was nominated for Best Lead Performance in the British Independent Film Awards' new gender-neutral category for his performance in It Is In Us All. He was also nominated for Best International Actor at the Irish Film and Television Awards. FX's Shōgun premiered in February 2024, receiving critical acclaim worldwide. Jarvis' performance as John Blackthorne was described as a "force to be reckoned with" by IGN and The Washington Post wrote that he "brilliantly channels" his role as the marooned English pilot in the historical drama. Empire described Jarvis as "compelling" and "magnetic". In his review, Nick Clark wrote for the Evening Standard, "Jarvis is one of those actors who is not just chameleonic – anyone who has seen him in Calm with Horses and then Persuasion can attest to his powers of transformation – but always brings so much more to a role than just speaking the words in order. It's the eyes; there's a whole lot going on behind them, and it means he's never less than compelling."

In 2025, Jarvis starred in the Australian prison drama Inside, The Alto Knights, starring alongside Robert De Niro and directed by Barry Levinson, and Ray Mendoza and Alex Garland's Warfare. Jarvis' performance in Warfare as Navy SEAL veteran Elliot Miller was widely acclaimed by critics, with Aiden Kelly writing "Every actor does a fantastic job, particularly Cosmo Jarvis in a part that once again shows the rising newcomer’s incredible range." for Collider.

In January 2025, Jarvis joined the cast of Guy Ritchie's Wife & Dog. In March 2025, Jarvis joined the cast of Christopher Nolan's The Odyssey, although he would drop out shortly before filming commenced due to scheduling conflict. In April 2025, Jarvis was officially confirmed to return as John Blackthorne for the second season of Shōgun alongside Hiroyuki Sanada. In May 2025, Jarvis was announced to star as future Soviet leader Joseph Stalin in Young Stalin, a film based on the biography of the same name by historian Simon Sebag Montefiore. In October 2025, Jarvis joined Paul Greengrass' The Uprising (formerly titled The Rage) led by Andrew Garfield, an action period drama film set in during the Peasant's Revolt.

== Personal life ==
Jarvis is married and has one child.

Jarvis is a fan of metal band System of a Down.

=== Views ===
Jarvis has stated an aversion to social media and contemporary U.K. politics.

In an interview with Crush Fanzine in 2021, Jarvis spoke about recognition of the Armenian genocide: “I do find it fascinating that the Armenian genocide… is still not acknowledged by some nations… certain genocides and tragedies can be openly minimized or discounted all together while others happen to become essential architecture of a pop culture and society.”

== Filmography ==
=== Film ===
Year	Title	Role	Notes
2015	Spooks: The Greater Good	Dani Tasuev	
2016	Lady Macbeth	Sebastian	
2017	The Marker	Steve	
2017	Hunter Killer	Fathometer Operator	
2018	Annihilation	Special Ops Soldier (uncredited)	
2018	Farming	Jonesy	
2019	Calm With Horses	Douglas	
2019	Nocturnal	Pete	
2020	The Evening Hour	Terry Rose	
2020	Funny Face	Saul	
2022	It Is In Us All	Hamish Considine	
2022	Persuasion	Frederick Wentworth	
2024	Inside	Mark Shepard	
2025	The Alto Knights	Vincent Gigante	
2025	Warfare	Elliot Miller	
2026	The Uprising	Wat Tyler	
2027	Wife & Dog †		Post-production
TBA	Young Stalin †	Joseph Stalin	Post-Production

=== Television ===
Year	Title	Role	Notes
2016	Moving On	Verno 14	Episode "Taxi for Linda"
2016	Humans	Martin	Episode 3 (Series 2)
2016	My Mother and Other Strangers	Lieutenant Steiger	Episodes "The Price" and "God Rest You Merry"
2017	Vera	Woody	Episode "The Blanket Mire"
2019	Peaky Blinders	Barney	Series 5
2020	Raised by Wolves	Campion Sturges	Episodes "Infected Memory", "Lost Paradise" and "Mass"
2024–present	Shōgun	John Blackthorne	Main role

== Awards and nominations ==
Award	Year	Category	Nominated work	Result	Ref.
The Astra Awards	2024	Best Actor in a Streaming Drama Series	Shōgun	Nominated	
British Independent Film Awards	2017	Most Promising Newcomer	Lady Macbeth	Nominated	
British Independent Film Awards	2020	Best Actor	Calm with Horses	Nominated	
British Independent Film Awards	2022	Best Lead Performance	It Is In Us All	Nominated	
British Independent Film Awards	2025	Best Ensemble Performance	Warfare	Won	
International Cinephile Society Awards	2023	Best Actor	It Is In Us All	Nominated	
Irish Film and Television Awards	2023	Best International Actor	It Is In Us All	Nominated	
London Critics Circle Film Awards	2021	British/Irish Actor of the Year	Calm with Horses	Nominated	
Screen Actors Guild Awards	2025	Outstanding Performance by an Ensemble in a Drama Series	Shōgun	Won	

== Discography ==
=== Albums ===
Year	Album details	Peak chart positions		Certifications
Year	Album details	UK	IRL	Certifications
2006	19 Songs By Cosmo Jarvis: Release date: 2006; Label: None; Format: CD, digital download	-	-	
2009	Humasyouhitch/Sonofabitch: Release date: 16 November 2009; Label: Wall of Sound; Format: CD, digital download	-	-	
2011	Is the World Strange or Am I Strange?: Release date: 26 September 2011; Label: 25th Frame; Format: CD, digital download			
2012	Think Bigger: Release date: 17 July 2012; Label: 25th Frame; Format: CD, digital download			
2013	They Don't Build Hearts Like They Used To - 4 Track E.P: Release date: 29 September 2013 – Aus / NZ, 17 November 2013 Rest Of The World; Label: Speed Vs Angle; Format: Limited Edition CD, digital download			

=== Singles ===
Year	Single	Peak chart positions				Album
Year	Single	UK	IRL	EU	US	Album
2009	"She's Got You"	—	—	—	—	Humasyouhitch/Sonofabitch
2009	"Problems/You Got Your Head"	—	—	—	—	Humasyouhitch/Sonofabitch
2010	"Crazy Screwed Up Lady"	—	—	—	—	Humasyouhitch/Sonofabitch
2011	"Gay Pirates"	—	—	—	—	Is the World Strange or Am I Strange?
2011	"Sure as Hell Not Jesus"	—	—	—	—	Is the World Strange or Am I Strange?
2011	"My Day"	—	—	—	—	Is the World Strange or Am I Strange?
2011	"She Doesn't Mind"	—	—	—	—	Is the World Strange or Am I Strange?
2012	"Love This"	—	—	—	—	Think Bigger
2013	"Collaborating With Rihanna"	—	—	—	—	Single
2020	"Tell Me Who To Be"					Think Bigger - (2020 Deluxe Edition)
