= Géla Babluani =

Georgian-French film director

Géla Babluani (Georgian: გელა ბაბლუანი) is a Georgian–French film director.

Babluani was born in Tbilisi, son of prominent director Temur Babluani. At 17 years of age, he and his three siblings were sent to study in France. His first short film, A Fleur de Peau (2002), received critical appraise. His first feature-length film is 13 Tzameti, won the World Cinema Jury Prize for a Dramatic motion picture at the Sundance Film Festival. In 2006 he directed the film L'héritage with his father about several people from France who visit Tbilisi for an inheritance. In 2010 he completed an American version of 13 Tzameti titled 13.

== Filmography ==
- À fleur de peau (2002), short film
- 13 Tzameti (2005)
- L'héritage (2006) directed with his father Temur Babluani
- 13 (2010)
- Money (2017)
- Sekta (2019), TV-series
- Young Stalin (2026), biographical film

== Bibliography ==
- Cineurope Interview (01/2006)
