= Steuermann =

Steuermann or Steuerman is a German occupational surname, which means "helmsman" or "second mate" on a ship. The name may refer to:

- Avram Steuerman-Rodion (1872–1918), Romanian writer
- Eduard Steuermann (1892–1964), Austrian pianist
- Salka Steuermann (1889–1978), Austrian actress and screenwriter
- Zygmunt Steuermann (1899–1941), Polish football player
