= Nathalie Biancheri =

Italian film director and screenwriter

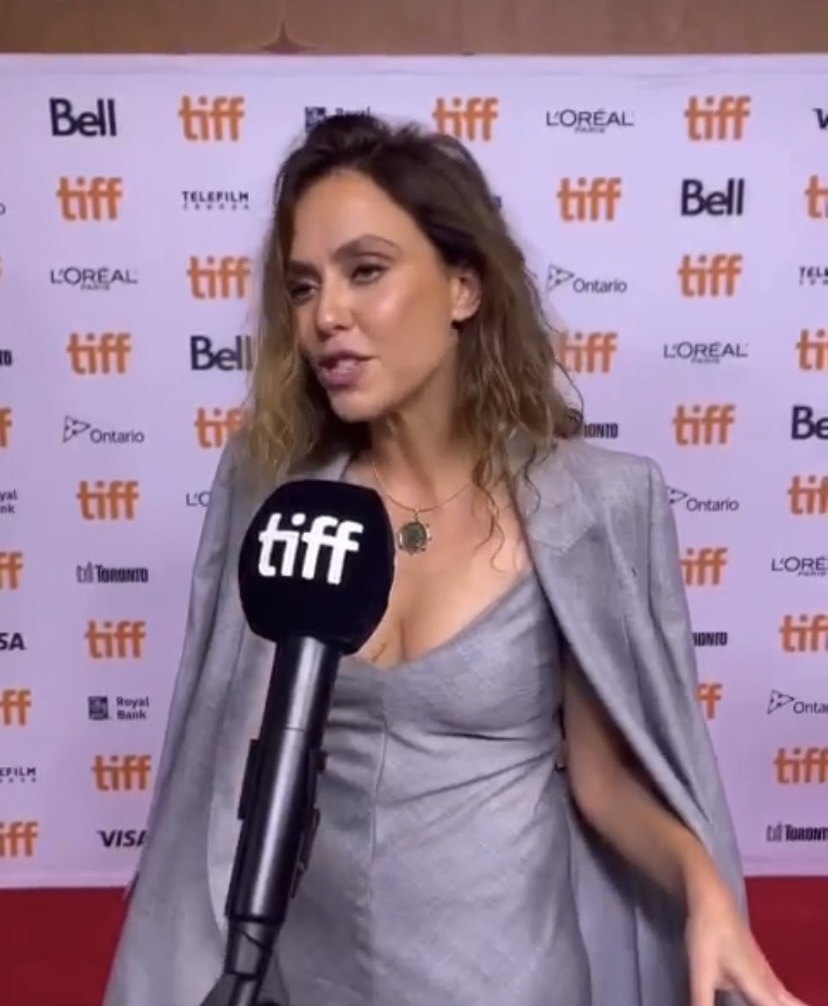
- Born: Italy
- Occupation(s): Director, screenwriter, producer
- Years active: 2014–present

Nathalie Biancheri is an Italian film director and screenwriter based in London. She is known for directing the films Wolf and Nocturnal.

== Career ==
Nathalie graduated from King's College London and began her career as a documentary researcher at the BBC. She co-founded the production company Feline Films with Jessie Fisk.

Nathalie's feature film directorial debut, Nocturnal, premiered at the BFI London Film Festival in 2019. Her second feature film Wolf, premiered at the Toronto International Film Festival in 2021. She was named one of IndieWire's "22 Rising Female Filmmakers to Watch" in 2022 and the Irish Times's "50 people to watch" in 2021.

== Filmography ==
| Year | Film | Director | Writer | Producer | Note |
|---|---|---|---|---|---|
| 2021 | Wolf | Yes | Yes | Yes | Feature film |
| 2020 | Shadows | No | No | Yes | Feature film |
| 2019 | Nocturnal | Yes | Yes | No | Feature film |
| 2019 | 24H Europe: The Next Generation | Yes | No | No | Documentary |
| 2019 | I Was Here | Yes | No | Yes | Documentary |
| 2017 | Xavier Corbero: Portrait of an Artist in Winter | Yes | No | No | Documentary |
| 2017 | Xavier Corbero: Portrait of an Artist in Winter | Yes | No | No | Documentary |
| 2016 | Gibberish | Yes | Yes | Yes | Short film |
| 2016 | Eliana | No | No | Yes | Short film |
| 2016 | In the Flesh | Yes | No | No | Short film |
| 2014 | The Crossing | Yes | Yes | Yes | Short film |

== Awards and nominations ==
| Year | Result | Award | Category | Work | Ref. |
|---|---|---|---|---|---|
| 2022 | Nominated | Sofia International Film Festival | International Competition | Wolf | |
| 2020 | Won | Sofia International Film Festival | Special Jury Award | Nocturnal | |
| 2019 | Nominated | CPH:DOX | NEXT:WAVE Award | I Was Here | |
| 2019 | Nominated | Transatlantyk Festival | Transatlantyk Distribution Award | I Was Here | |
| 2018 | Won | RiverRun International Film Festival | Best Documentary Short Film | Xavier Corbero: Portrait of an Artist in Winter | |
| 2018 | Nominated | South by Southwest | Documentary Short | Xavier Corbero: Portrait of an Artist in Winter | |
| 2017 | Nominated | Rhode Island International Film Festival | Grand Prize | Gibberish | |
| 2015 | Nominated | Edinburgh International Film Festival | Best Short Film | The Crossing | |
