= John Blackthorne =

Protagonist of the Shogun novel

- Shōgun character
- Richard Chamberlain as John Blackthorne with Yoko Shimada as Toda Mariko in the 1980 Shōgun miniseries
- First appearance: Shōgun (1975)
- Portrayed by: Richard Chamberlain (1980 miniseries); Cosmo Jarvis (2024 TV series)

In-universe information
- Full name: John Blackthorne
- Aliases: Anjin (按針, lit. "Pilot, Navigator, Steuermann")
- Nicknames: Barbarian (蛮人, Banjin); Heretic; The Freak from the West
- Gender: Male
- Title(s): Hatamoto (旗本); Daimyo of Kanagawa; Chief Admiral of the Kanto region General of the Cannon Regiment
- Occupation: Pilot Major; Privateer; Artillerist; Daimyo; Samurai; Diplomat
- Affiliation: Dutch ship Erasmus (Pilot) Kingdom of England; Republic of the Seven United Netherlands (Privateer) Yoshii Toranaga
- Family: Tudor Blackthorne (Son); Elizabeth Blackthorne (Daughter)
- Religion: Protestant (formerly); Shinto-Buddhist
- Origin: London, Kingdom of England
- Born: 1564, England
- Died: c. 1620, Japan

John Blackthorne, also known as Anjin (按針; lit. "Pilot", "Steuermann"), is the protagonist of James Clavell's 1975 novel Shōgun. The character is loosely based on the life of the 17th-century English navigator William Adams, who was the first Englishman to visit Japan. The character is played by Richard Chamberlain in the 1980 TV miniseries, and by Cosmo Jarvis in the 2024 series.

== Fictional biography ==
In the novel, Blackthorne is described as a navigator, and the "first English pilot ever to get through Magellan's Pass". His vessel, the Erasmus, was hired by Dutch traders in 1598 to navigate beyond the Indian Ocean and reach Japan, where he and the surviving crew are immediately imprisoned. A Protestant like his crewmates, Blackthorne is branded as a heretic by the Portuguese Jesuits who control all foreign trade in Japan. The Jesuits themselves hold no direct power nor the ability to kill him outright, due to their foreigner status in Japan and delicate local politics. Blackthorne is taken to Lord Toranaga (based on the historical figure, Tokugawa Ieyasu), a daimyō in control of the territory where the Erasmus first landed. Toranaga quickly realizes that Blackthorne and his ship present a great opportunity, not only in his dealings with the Portuguese but also in his struggle with his main rival, Lord Ishido (based on Ishida Mitsunari). Lord Toranaga orders Blackthorne's imprisonment, not to punish him, but to keep him out of Ishido's reach. While in prison Blackthorne meets a Franciscan priest who gives him a much greater understanding of the tumultuous sociopolitical situation in Japan, and where the Portuguese and the Jesuits fit into it. The priest also begins teaching Blackthorne the rudiments of the Japanese language.

Having been told by the priest that all who enter the prison are eventually executed, Blackthorne is prepared to die when his name is called (like the historical Adams, the Japanese call him Anjin-san - Mr. Pilot - because his English name is too difficult to pronounce, there being no sounds or characters in Japanese for much of his name). Instead, the guards take him to Osaka Castle, where he is cleaned up and told by Mariko - the Christian wife of one of Toranaga's samurai who, like Blackthorne, is fluent in Portuguese and Latin - that Lord Toranaga wishes to know more about England and its war against the Spanish and Portuguese.

As a result of a series of events, Blackthorne eventually finds himself very close to Toranaga, saving his life on multiple occasions, as he begins to understand and deeply respect Japanese culture. For his service, he is awarded the titles, privileges and obligations of hatamoto, granted a fiefdom as Daimyo of Kanagawa, promoted to samurai and commissioned a command as both Chief Admiral of the Kanto region and General of the Cannon Regiment. However, to complicate matters, he starts to fall in love with the interpreter, Mariko, and they eventually become lovers. Though Blackthorne asks Toranaga to sever Mariko's marriage so she will be free to marry him, Toranaga refuses and orders Blackthorne never to speak of the matter again. In spite of this, Blackthorne becomes a trusted friend of Toranaga.

At the end of the book, Toranaga defeats Ishido's forces (a reference to the Battle of Sekigahara) and becomes Shōgun. Though Toranaga secretly had Erasmus burned and beached, he permits Blackthorne to begin constructing another ship to keep him occupied. Around this time, Toranaga also decides that Blackthorne will never be allowed to leave Japan. It can be assumed that Blackthorne eventually died in Japan without ever returning to England.

== Legacy in the Asian saga ==
Although Blackthorne's later life is never covered in any real detail in Clavell's later Asian Saga novels, Gai-Jin (which features Malcolm Struan the Tai-Pan heir to the Noble House of Struan's) mentions that Blackthorne later built ships for Shogun Toranaga, and had families in Nagasaki and Izu. One of Blackthorne's Nagasaki descendants, Shin Komoda, is mentioned as having been a samurai who died in a brawl shortly before the events in Gai-Jin take place (during the early 1860s). Komoda and his wife Gekko had one son, who was sent to live with his grandparents shortly after Komoda's death. Yoshi Toranaga, Guardian of the Heir and a descendant of his namesake from Shōgun, reads in the Toranaga Legacy, his ancestor's memoirs, about the Anjin and the cannons he provided, and muses on how to use foreigners the same way his forefather did.

In Clavell's novel Noble House, a minor character named Riko Anjin makes a brief appearance. When main character Ian Dunross (Tai-Pan and a descendant of the Struans) notes her blue eyes, she relates a family legend that she is descended from a shipwrecked Englishman who became a samurai and advisor, and first lived near Yokohama before moving to Nagasaki and becoming an inspector of foreigners there, and supposedly marrying a noble lady similarly named Riko. Despite telling the story, Riko considers it implausible.
