= Primetime Emmy Award for Outstanding Sound Editing for a Comedy or Drama Series (One-Hour) =

Television award category

Primetime Emmy Award for Sound Editing for a Comedy or Drama Series (One-Hour)
- Awarded for: Outstanding Sound Editing for a One-Hour Series
- Country: United States
- Presented by: Academy of Television Arts & Sciences
- Currently held by: Spider-Noir (2026)
- Website: emmys.com

The Primetime Emmy Award for Sound Editing for a Comedy or Drama Series (One-Hour) is an award handed out annually at the Creative Arts Emmy Awards. Prior to 1976 and between 1979 and 1983, regular series competed with limited series and movies for Outstanding Achievement in Film Sound Editing. In 2018, the category was split to separately recognize one-hour and half-hour series.

In the following list, the first titles listed in gold are the winners; those not in gold are nominees, which are listed in alphabetical order. The years given are those in which the ceremonies took place:

== Winners and nominations ==
Outstanding Achievement in Film Sound Editing

=== 1970s ===
Year	Program	Episode	Nominees	Network
1970 (22nd)
1970 (22nd)	Gunsmoke		Norman Karlin, Richard E. Raderman	CBS
1970 (22nd)	The Immortal		Alex Bamattre, Michael Colgan, Doug Grindstaff, Joe Kavigan, Bill Lee, Josef von Stroheim	ABC
1970 (22nd)	Land of the Giants		Robert Cornett, Don Hall, William Howard, John Kline, Larry Meek, Frank R. White	ABC
1971 (23rd)
1971 (23rd)	Tribes		Don Hall, Jack Jackson, Dick Jensen, Bob Weatherford	ABC
1971 (23rd)	Mannix		Doug Grindstaff, Seth D. Larsen, Billie Owens, Bill Rivol, Edward L. Sandlin, Josef von Stroheim	CBS
1971 (23rd)	Mission: Impossible		Don Crosby, Doug Grindstaff, Joe Kavigan, Chuck Perry, Frank White	CBS
1972 (24th)
1972 (24th)	Duel		Sam Caylor, Jerry Christian, Dale Johnston, Jack Kirschner, Ronald LaVine, Sidney Lubow, Richard Raderman, John Stacy, James Troutman	ABC
1972 (24th)	Brian's Song		George Emick, Wayne Fury, Ralph Hickey, Marvin I. Kosberg, Paul Laune, Monty Pearce, Harold Wooley	ABC
1972 (24th)	The Undersea World of Jacques Cousteau		Charles L. Campbell, Colin Mouat, Roger A. Sword	ABC
1973 (25th)
1973 (25th)	The Red Pony		Frederick Brown, A. David Marshall, Ross Taylor	NBC
1973 (25th)	Short Walk to Daylight		Peter Berkos, Brian Courcier, Gordon Ecker, Walter Jenevein, Sidney Lubow, George E. Luckenbacher, James Nownes, John Singleton, John Stacy	ABC
1973 (25th)	The Undersea World of Jacques Cousteau		Charles L. Campbell, Robert Cornett, Jerry R. Stanford, Roger A. Sword	ABC
1974 (26th)
1974 (26th)	Pueblo		Bud Nolan	ABC
1974 (26th)	Kojak		Sam Caylor, Stanley Frazen, Jack Kirschner, Sid Lubow, Richard Raderman, John Singleton	CBS
1974 (26th)	Police Story		William Andrews, Ronald Ashcroft, Richard Burrow, Milton Burrow, Tony Garber, Al Kajita, Jack Milner, Jerry Rosenthal, Edward L. Sandlin	NBC
1975 (27th)
1975 (27th)	QB VII	"Part 1 & 2"	William Andrews, Ronald Ashcroft, James Ballas, Richard Burrow, Milton Burrow, Tony Garber, Jeremy Hoenack, David Horton, Alvin Kajita, Marvin I. Kosberg, Jack Milner, Jerry Rosenthal, Edward L. Sandlin, Josef von Stroheim	ABC
1975 (27th)	The Legend of Lizzie Borden		Don Higgins, Don Isaacs, Larry Kaufman, Jack Kirschner, Dick LeGrand, Gary Vaughan, Gene Wahrman, Frank White, Harold Wooley	ABC

Outstanding Achievement in Film Sound Editing for a Single Episode of a Regular or Limited Series

Year	Program	Episode	Nominees	Network
1976 (28th)
1976 (28th)	Medical Story	"The Quality of Mercy"	William Andrews, Dick Friedman, Stan Gilbert, Doug Grindstaff, Al Kajita, Marvin I. Kosberg, Hans Newman, Hank Salerno, Leon Selditz, Larry Singer	NBC
1976 (28th)	Police Woman	"Task Force"	William Andrews, Dick Friedman, Stan Gilbert, Jeremy Hoenack, Bob Human, Al Kajita, Marvin I. Kosberg, Jack Milner, Hans Newman, Hank Salerno, Leon Selditz, Larry Singer, Luke Wolfram	NBC
1976 (28th)	The Six Million Dollar Man	"The Secret of Bigfoot"	Jerry Christian, Dennis Diltz, Jack Jackson, Walter Jenevein, Dale Johnston, George E. Luckenbacher, Thomas M. Patchett, David A. Schonleber, John Singleton, Ken Sweet	ABC

Outstanding Achievement in Film Sound Editing for a Series

Year	Program	Episode	Nominees	Network
1977 (29th)
1977 (29th)	Roots	"Part 2"	Larry Carow, George Fredrick, Colin Mouat, Larry Neiman, Dave Pettijohn, Paul Bruce Richardson, Don Warner	NBC
1977 (29th)	Charlie's Angels	"The Mexican Connection"	Michael Corrigan, Jerry Rosenthal, William L. Stevenson	ABC
1977 (29th)	The Fantastic Journey		Stanley M. Gilbert, Doug Grindstaff, Don Isaacs, Al Kajita, Sid Lubow, Hans Newman, Richard Raderman, Hank Salerno, Larry Singer, Luke Wolfram	NBC
1977 (29th)	The Six Million Dollar Man	"The Return of Bigfoot, Part 1"	James A. Bean, Carl J. Brandon, Gene Craig, Joe Divitale, Dale Johnston, Don Tomlinson, Don Weinman	ABC
1978 (30th)
1978 (30th)	Police Story	"River of Promises"	Lee Chaney, Christopher Chulack, Don Crosby, Mark Dennis, Doug Grindstaff, Don Isaacs, Al Kajita, Steve Olson, Richard Raderman, Hank Salerno, Larry Singer	NBC
1978 (30th)	Baa Baa Black Sheep	"The Hawk Flies on Sunday"	Larry Carow, Pieter S. Hubbard, Chuck Moran, Colin Mouat, David Pettijohn, Don Warner	NBC
1978 (30th)	Fantasy Island	"Lady of the Evening / The Racer"	Dwayne Avery, Christopher Chulack, Richard Friedman, Doug Grindstaff, Don Isaacs, Al Kajita, Hank Salerno, Larry Singer, Luke Wolfram	ABC
1978 (30th)	Lou Grant	"Nazi"	Ron Clark, Tony Garber, Dale Johnston	CBS
1978 (30th)	Roll of Thunder, Hear My Cry		Richard Raderman, William Stevenson	ABC
1979 (31st)	Outstanding Achievement in Film Sound Editing			
1979 (31st)	Friendly Fire		William H. Wistrom	ABC
1979 (31st)	A Fire in the Sky		Mark Dennis, Doug Grindstaff, Bob Human, Don Isaacs, Larry Kaufman, Hank Salerno, Larry Singer	NBC
1979 (31st)	Ike	"Part 2"	Leonard Corso, Linda Dove, Peter Harrison, Michael Redbourn, Russ Tinsley	ABC
1979 (31st)	The Triangle Factory Fire Scandal		Charles L. Campbell, Bob Canton, Pieter S. Hubbard, Charles E. Moran, Colin Mouat, Lawrence E. Neiman, David Pettijohn, Martin Varno, Gary Vaughan, Don Warner	NBC
1979 (31st)	Outstanding Individual Achievement - Creative Technical Crafts (Note: As a juried award, nominees had to garner 50% approval to win the award. The nominee did not meet the benchmark and no award was given.)			
1979 (31st)	Welcome Back, Kotter	"Barbarino's Baby"	Dick Wilson	ABC

=== 1980s ===
Year	Program	Episode	Nominees	Network
1980 (32nd)
1980 (32nd)	Power		Don Crosby, Mark Dennis, Tony Garber, Doug Grindstaff, Don Isaacs, Hank Salerno, Larry Singer	NBC
1980 (32nd)	Amber Waves		Tom Cornwell, Peter Harrison, Andrew Herbert, Michael L. Hilkene, Fred Judkins, Jill Taggart, Russ Tinsley	ABC
1980 (32nd)	Attica		Tom Cornwell, Dave Elliott, Don Ernst, Dimitry Gortinsky, Peter Harrison, Andrew Herbert, Michael L. Hilkene, Fred Judkins, Jill Taggart, Russ Tinsley, Christopher T. Welch	ABC
1980 (32nd)	The Plutonium Incident		Don Crosby, Mark Dennis, Tony Garber, Doug Grindstaff, Don Isaacs, Hank Salerno, Larry Singer	CBS
1981 (33rd)	Outstanding Achievement in Film Sound Editing			
1981 (33rd)	Hill Street Blues	"Hill Street Station"	Robert Cornett, Samuel Horta, Denise Horta, Eileen Horta	NBC
1981 (33rd)	Evita Peron	"Part 1"	Tom Cornwell, Peter Harrison, William Manger, R. William A. Thiederman, Russ Tinsley, Christopher T. Welch, Bill Wistrom	NBC
1981 (33rd)	Shōgun	"Part 3"	Bill Andrews, Leonard Corso, Denis Dutton, Jack Finley, Bob Gutknecht, Sean Hanley, Pierre Jalbert, Jack Keath, Alan Nineberg, Lee Osborne, Stanley M. Paul, Tally Paulos	NBC
1981 (33rd)	A Whale for the Killing		Tom Cornwell, Jere Golding, Dimitry Gortinsky, Michael Hilkene, John Kline, William Manger, Bob Pearson, Russ Tinsley, Christopher T. Welch	ABC
1981 (33rd)	The Women's Room		Albert Cavigga, Tom Cornwell, Linda Dove, Dave Elliott, Don Ernst, Dimitry Gortinsky, Peter Harrison, Michael Hilkene, Jerry Jacobson, Fred Judkins, John Kline, Corinne Sessarego, Russ Tinsley, Rusty Tinsley, Christopher T. Welch	ABC
1981 (33rd)	Outstanding Individual Achievement - Creative Technical Crafts (Note: As a juried award, nominees had to garner 50% approval to win the award. The nominee did not meet the benchmark and no award was given.)			
1981 (33rd)	Fridays	"Episode 8"	Dick Wilson	ABC
1982 (34th)
1982 (34th)	Inside the Third Reich		Peter Bond, Tom Cornwell, David R. Elliott, Tony Garber, Peter Harrison, Joseph Mayer, Charles W. McCann, Joseph Melody, R. William A. Thiederman, Russ Tinsley, Rusty Tinsley, William H. Wistrom	ABC
1982 (34th)	The Capture of Grizzly Adams		Tom Cornwell, David R. Elliott, Peter Harrison, Michael Hilkene, Fred Judkins, John Kline, Joseph Melody, R. William A. Thiederman, Russ Tinsley, William H. Wistrom	NBC
1982 (34th)	Marco Polo		Jeff Bushelman, Steve Bushelman, Barney Cabral, William De Nicholas, Jere Golding, Frank Howard, Bobbe Kurtz, Ian Macgregor-Scott, Lettie Odney, Bernard F. Pincus, Sam Shaw, Patrick Somerset, Frank Spencer, David E. Stone, Ascher Yates	NBC
1982 (34th)	Marian Rose White		Tom Cornwell, David R. Elliott, Don Ernst, Michael Hilkene, Fred Judkins, John Kline, Joseph Melody, R. William A. Thiederman, Russ Tinsley, Rusty Tinsley	CBS

Outstanding Sound Editing for a Series

Year	Program	Episode	Nominees	Network
1983 (35th)
1983 (35th)	Hill Street Blues	"Stan the Man"	Sam Horta, Donald W. Ernst, Avram D. Gold, Eileen Horta, Constance A. Kazmer, Gary Krivacek	NBC
1983 (35th)	Knight Rider	"Knight of the Phoenix"	Walt Jenevein, Barney Cabral, John Detra, Dennis Diltz, Sam Gemette, Robert Gravenor, Phil Haberman, Jerry Jacobson, Marvin I. Kosberg, Billy Mauch, Anthony Palk, Edward L. Sandlin, Kyle Wright, Sam F. Shaw, William Shenberg, Bruce Stambler, Andrew Torres	NBC
1983 (35th)	M*A*S*H	"Goodbye, Farewell and Amen"	Edward Rossi, William Hartman, David M. Ice, Godfrey Marks, Richard Sperber, Don Isaacs	CBS
1983 (35th)	St. Elsewhere	"Working"	Sam Horta, Donald W. Ernst, Jerelyn J. Harding, Avram D. Gold, Constance A. Kazmer, Gary Krivacek	NBC
1983 (35th)	Tales of the Gold Monkey	"Honor Thy Brother"	Sam F. Shaw, Barney Cabral, John Detra, Sam Gemette, Donlee Jorgensen, Mark Roberts, Eric Shrader, John Stacy, Bob Weatherford, Paul Wittenberg, William Shenberg	ABC
1984 (36th)
1984 (36th)	Airwolf	"Shadow of the Hawke"	Sam F. Shaw, Michael H. Ford, Donlee Jorgensen, Mark Roberts, Breck Warwick, Bob Weatherford, Michael D. Wilhoit, Nicholas Vincent Korda, Gene L. Gillette	CBS
1984 (36th)	Falcon Crest	"Ashes to Ashes"	Bill Wistrom, Mace Matiosian, Joanie Diener	CBS
1984 (36th)	Hill Street Blues	"Parting Is Such Sweep Sorrow"	Gary Krivacek, Timothy J. Borquez, Mark R. Crookston, Bill Dannevick, Stephen Janisz, Mary Ruth Smith, Jerelyn J. Harding, Don Sanders	NBC
1984 (36th)	Ripley's Believe It or Not!	"Hindenburg"	David R. Elliott, Anthony Mazzei, Michael J. Mitchell, David A. Whittaker	ABC
1984 (36th)	Simon & Simon	"Betty Grable Flies Again"	Kyle Wright, Bruce Bell, Golden Felton, Phil Haberman, Donlee Jorgensen, Ian MacGregor-Scott, Don Tomlinson, Sabato Fiorello, Dave Kahn	CBS
1985 (37th)
1985 (37th)	Miami Vice	"Brother's Keeper"	Charles E. Moran, Bruce Bell, Victor B. Lackey, Ian MacGregor-Scott, Carl Mahakian, John Oettinger, Bernard F. Pincus, Warren Smith, Bruce Stambler, Michael D. Wilhoit, Kyle Wright, Paul Wittenberg, Jerry Cohen	NBC
1985 (37th)	Airwolf	"Firestorm"	Michael D. Wilhoit, Gene Corso, Donlee Jorgensen, Gary Mundheim, Bob Newlan, Asher Yates, Barney Cabral, Gene L. Gillette	CBS
1985 (37th)	Miami Vice	"Smuggler's Blues"	John A. Larsen, Scott Hecker, Harry B. Miller III, Robert Rutledge, Gary Vaughan, Jay Wilkinson, Norto Sepulveda, Jerry Cohen	NBC
1985 (37th)	Murder, She Wrote	"Funeral at Fifty-Mile"	Anthony Magro, Anthony Milch, Linda Moss, Steve Shearsby, Billy Mauch, Laurie Higgins Tobias	CBS
1985 (37th)	Ripley's Believe It or Not!	"Accident Research"	David R. Elliott, Doug Gray, James Wolvington, Robert Fisher, Michael J. Mitchell	ABC
1986 (38th)
1986 (38th)	Amazing Stories	"The Mission"	Richard L. Anderson, Wayne Allwine, James Christopher, George Fredrick, John Stacy, Burton Weinstein, Lettie Odney, Denise Whiting, Kenneth Wannberg	NBC
1986 (38th)	Airwolf	"Eagles"	Michael D. Wilhoit, Gene Corso, Michael H. Ford, Hector C. Gika, Donlee Jorgensen, Asher Yates, Ernesto Mas, Gene L. Gillette	CBS
1986 (38th)	Hill Street Blues	"Two Easy Pieces"	Gary Krivacek, Timothy J. Borquez, Mark R. Crookston, Bill Dannevick, Stephen Janisz, Mary Ruth Smith, Jerelyn J. Harding, Don Sanders	NBC
1986 (38th)	Misfits of Science	"Deep Freeze"	Kyle Wright, Bruce Bell, Barney Cabral, Phil Haberman, Mark Hollingsworth, Donlee Jorgensen, Jimmy Ling, Bernard F. Pincus, Vern Shaw, Bruce Stambler, Michael D. Wilhoit, Richard Marx, Laurie Higgins Tobias	NBC
1986 (38th)	St. Elsewhere	"Time Heals, Part 1"	Kevin Spears, Mark R. Crookston, Andrea Horta, Constance A. Kazmer, Brian F. Mars, John O. Robinson III, Dan Garde	NBC
1987 (39th)
1987 (39th)	Max Headroom	"Blipverts"	Doug Grindstaff, Richard Corwin, Clark Conrad, Brad Sherman, Richard Taylor, James Wolvington, Dick Bernstein	ABC
1987 (39th)	The A-Team	"Firing Line"	Dick Wahrman, Gene Craig, Thomas McMullen, John Kaufman, Jack Woods, Roxanne Jones, Cliff Bell Jr., John Caper	NBC
1987 (39th)	Hunter	"The Castro Connection"	Sam Gemette, Dave Kulczycki, Ed Osborne, John Post, Edward L. Sandlin, Gary Vaughan, Cliff Bell Jr., John Caper Jr.	NBC
1987 (39th)	L.A. Law	"Pilot"	Sam Horta, Petra Bach, Sam Black, Donald W. Ernst, Terence Thomas, Andrea Horta, Ron Horwitz, Constance A. Kazmer, Gary Krivacek, Russ Hill, Warner E. Leighton, Margaret Webb, Eileen Horta, John R. Harris	NBC
1987 (39th)	Stingray	"Gemini"	Larry Mann, Ray Alba, Allan Bromberg, John M. Colwell, Joe Divitale, Jim Siracusa, John Kline, Angelo Bruzzese, Michael Dittrick	NBC
1988 (40th)
1988 (40th)	Star Trek: The Next Generation	"11001001"	Bill Wistrom, Wilson Dyer, Mace Matiosian, James Wolvington, Gerry Sackman, Keith Bilderbeck	Syndicated
1988 (40th)	Beauty and the Beast	"No Way Down"	Anthony Mazzei, Scott Martin Gershin, Bobby Mackston, Steve Dutkovich, Dave Weathers, David Hankins, Don Sanders	CBS
1988 (40th)	Hunter	"The Black Dahlia"	Sam Gemette, Ray Alba, John M. Colwell, William Jacobs, Jim Siracusa, Craig Vandagriff, Cliff Bell Jr., Jeff Charbonneau	NBC
1988 (40th)	J.J. Starbuck	"Incident at Sam September"	Dick Wahrman, Joe Divitale, John Kline, Allan Bromberg, Ed Osborne, Steve Olson, Cliff Bell Jr., John Caper Jr.	NBC
1988 (40th)	Wiseguy	"Pilot"	Gary Winter, William Jacobs, John M. Colwell, Ray Alba, Jim Siracusa, Michael O'Corrigan, William Hooper, Bill Young, Robert Gutknecht, Joe Divitale, John Kaufman, Thomas McMullen, John Kline, Cliff Bell Jr., John Caper Jr.	CBS
1989 (41st)
1989 (41st)	Star Trek: The Next Generation	"Q Who"	Bill Wistrom, James Wolvington, Mace Matiosian, Wilson Dyer, Guy Tsujimoto, Gerry Sackman	Syndicated
1989 (41st)	Beauty and the Beast	"The Watcher"	David Hankins, Bobby Mackston, Michael L. DePatie, Pat McCormick, Ralph Osborn, Richard Taylor, Bruce P. Michaels, Lori Slomka	CBS
1989 (41st)	Hunter	"City Under Siege, Part 3"	Craig Vandagriff, Ray Alba, Cindy Marty, Ed Osborne, Steve Olson, Ian MacGregor-Scott, Jack Woods, Susan Mick	NBC
1989 (41st)	MacGyver	"Gold Rush"	William H. Angarola, Miguel Rivera, Barbara Issak, Jon Johnson, Keith Bilderbeck, Art Ottinger, Steve Danforth	ABC
1989 (41st)	Wiseguy	"All or Nothing"	Robert Gutknecht, John Kaufman, William Hooper, Bill Young, Edward L. Sandlin, Roxanne Jones, Paul Wittenberg, Jeff Charbonneau	CBS

=== 1990s ===
Year	Program	Episode	Nominees	Network
1990 (42nd)
1990 (42nd)	Star Trek: The Next Generation	"Yesterday's Enterprise"	Bill Wistrom, James Wolvington, Mace Matiosian, Wilson Dyer, Rick Freeman, Gerry Sackman	Syndicated
1990 (42nd)	MacGyver	"The Lost Amadeus"	William H. Angarola, Barbara Issak, Miguel Rivera, George Nemzer, Guy Tsujimoto, David Long, Steve Danforth	ABC
1990 (42nd)	Mission: Impossible	"Golden Serpent"	Mark Server, George R. Groves Jr., Ken Gladden, Joseph A. Johnston, Craig M. Otte, James D. Young	ABC
1990 (42nd)	Twin Peaks	"Episode 7"	John A. Larsen, Matt Sawelson, John Haeny, Pat McCormick, Albert Edmund Lord III, Fred Cipriano, Bruce P. Michaels, Lori L. Eschler	ABC
1990 (42nd)	Wiseguy	"Heir to the Throne"	Robert Gutknecht, Bill Young, William Hooper, Edward L. Sandlin, Richard LeGrand Jr., John Kaufman, Paul Wittenberg, Jeff Charbonneau	CBS
1991 (43rd)
1991 (43rd)	Star Trek: The Next Generation	"The Best of Both Worlds, Part 2"	Bill Wistrom, James Wolvington, Mace Matiosian, Wilson Dyer, Masanobu 'Tomi' Tomita, Dan Yale, Gerry Sackman	Syndicated
1991 (43rd)	The Flash	"The Trickster"	Gonzo Cervantes, James Koford, Greg Stacy, Kerry Dean Williams, Warren Smith, Kenneth R. Burton, Mike Goodman, Thomas Milano	CBS
1991 (43rd)	Quantum Leap	"Black on White on Fire"	Paul B. Clay, Susan Kurtz, Greg Schorer, Carin Rogers, William Williams, Rick Bozeat, Ernesto Mas, Donald Woods	NBC
1991 (43rd)	Twin Peaks	"Episode 25"	Richard Taylor, Pat McCormick, Richard F.W. Davis, Thomas DeGorter, Albert Edmund Lord III, Lori L. Eschler	ABC
1992 (44th)
1992 (44th)	Law & Order	"Heaven"	David Hankins, Frank A. Fuller Jr., Peter Bergren, David A. Cohen, Richard Thomas, Barbara Issak, James Hebenstreit, Albert Edmund Lord III, Barbara Schechter	NBC
1992 (44th)	Civil Wars	"Oceans White with Phone"	Dave Weathers, Richard Taylor, Barbara Issak, Frank A. Fuller Jr., Pat McCormick, Gary Lewis, Albert Edmund Lord III, James Hebenstreit	ABC
1992 (44th)	Northern Exposure	"Three Amigos"	William H. Angarola, Miguel Rivera, Brian Risner, Michael L. DePatie, Kimberly Lambert, Patty von Arx, Allan K. Rosen	CBS
1992 (44th)	Quantum Leap	"Hurricane"	Greg Schorer, Bob Costanza, Rick Crampton, Mike Dickeson, Dan Luna, Gary Macheel, Mark Steele, Richard S. Steele, Ernesto Mas, Bruce Frazier	NBC
1992 (44th)	Star Trek: The Next Generation	"Power Play"	Bill Wistrom, James Wolvington, Wilson Dyer, Masanobu 'Tomi' Tomita, Dan Yale, Gerry Sackman	Syndicated
1993 (45th)
1993 (45th)	The Young Indiana Jones Chronicles	"Somme, Early August 1916"	Tom Bellfort, Larry Oatfield, Christopher Scarabosio, Michael Silvers, David Slusser, Tom Villano, Jamie Forester	ABC
1993 (45th)	Northern Exposure	"Kaddish for Uncle Manny"	William H. Angarola, Michael L. DePatie, Joel Valentine, Mark Seagrave, Kimberly Lambert, Tony Cappelli, Allan K. Rosen, Patty von Arx	CBS
1993 (45th)	Quantum Leap	"The Leap Between the States"	Greg Schorer, Gary Macheel, Rick Crampton, Dan Luna, Bob Costanza, Richard S. Steele, Ernesto Mas, Bruce Frazier	NBC
1993 (45th)	Star Trek: Deep Space Nine	"Emissary, Part 2"	James Wolvington, Bill Wistrom, Ashley Harvey, Miguel Rivera, Jeff Gersh, Sean Callery, Steffan Falesitch, Stephen M. Rowe	Syndicated
1993 (45th)	Star Trek: The Next Generation	"Time's Arrow, Part 2"	Bill Wistrom, James Wolvington, Miguel Rivera, Masanobu 'Tomi' Tomita, Guy Tsujimoto, Jeff Gersh, Dan Yale, Gerry Sackman	Syndicated
1993 (45th)	The Untouchables	"Pilot"	Stephen Grubbs, Gary S. Gelfand, Craig M. Otte, Andre Caporaso, Eric A. Norris, Joey L. Carey, David Scharf, John Kincade, Todd Niesen, Burton Weinstein, Michael C. Gutierrez, Clark Conrad, Jay Keiser, Steve Danforth	Syndicated
1994 (46th)
1994 (46th)	Northern Exposure	"Fish Story"	William H. Angarola, Mark Seagrave, Kimberly Lambert, Tony Cappelli, Michael L. DePatie, Joel Valentine, Patty von Arx, Allan K. Rosen, Alicia Stevenson, Zane D. Bruce	CBS
1994 (46th)	The Commish	"Letter of the Law"	Michael O'Corrigan, Steve Olson, Jim Yant, John M. Colwell, Craig Vandagriff, Archie Ronald Garrard, Barbara Schechter, Evelyn Dutton, Gail Steele	ABC
1994 (46th)	NYPD Blue	"NYPD Lou"	Dave Weathers, Ron Evans, Ken Gladden, Dennis Gray, Linda Keim, Albert Edmund Lord III, Patty McGettigan, Nancy Parker, Alyson Dee Moore	ABC
1994 (46th)	Star Trek: The Next Generation	"Genesis"	Mace Matiosian, Ruth Adelman, Miguel Rivera, Masanobu 'Tomi' Tomita, Guy Tsujimoto, Jeff Gersh, Gerry Sackman, Jerry Trent, Audrey Trent	Syndicated
1994 (46th)	Walker, Texas Ranger	"In the Name of God"	Michael O'Corrigan, Dick Wahrman, Steve Olson, Joe Divitale, Marty Wereski, Gail Steele, Evelyn Dutton	CBS
1995 (47th)
1995 (47th)	ER	"Love's Labor Lost"	Walter Newman, John Voss Bonds Jr., Rick Camera, Steven M. Sax, John F. Reynolds, Catherine Flynn, Thomas A. Harris, Susan Mick, Casey J. Crabtree, James Bailey	NBC
1995 (47th)	Dr. Quinn, Medicine Woman	"Washita, Part 2"	Lawrence E. Neiman, David M. Cowan, Gary Friedman, Paul J. Diller, John Chalfant	CBS
1995 (47th)	Earth 2	"First Contact"	Richard Taylor, David Hankins, Eric Erickson, James Hebenstreit, Barbara Issak, Peter Bergren, Mitch Gettleman, Joe Earle, John Haeny, Myron Nettinga, Brian Thomas Nist, Alyson Dee Moore, Patricia Nedd	NBC
1995 (47th)	The Marshal	"Hitwoman"	Albert Ibbotson, Steffan Falesitch, Harry Cheney, Mark Larry, Rich Tavtigian, Michael W. Mitchell, Jean-Marie Mitchell, Steve Danforth, Timothy Pearson	ABC
1995 (47th)	The X-Files	"Duane Barry"	Thierry J. Couturier, Maciek Malish, Christopher B. Reeves, Marty Stein, H. Jay Levine, Stuart Calderon, Michael Kimball, David F. Van Slyke, Susan Welsh, Chris Fradkin, Matthew West, Ira Leslie, Jeff Charbonneau, Debby Ruby-Winsberg, Kitty Malone, Yvonne Preble	Fox
1996 (48th)
1996 (48th)	The X-Files	"Nisei"	Thierry J. Couturier, Maciek Malish, Christopher B. Reeves, Mike Goodman, Debby Ruby-Winsberg, Susan Welsh, Michael Kimball, Rick Hinson, Ira Leslie, Marty Stein, Jeff Charbonneau, Kitty Malone, Joseph T. Sabella, Jerry Jacobson, Greg Pusateri	Fox
1996 (48th)	Dr. Quinn, Medicine Woman	"Halloween III"	Bob Redpath, David M. Cowan, John Chalfant, Amy Morrison, Ken Kobett, Kami Asgar, Brian Connell, Gary A. Hecker	CBS
1996 (48th)	Law & Order	"Hot Pursuit"	Mark Server, Jeffrey Kaplan, Michael Gollom, Libby Pedersen	NBC
1996 (48th)	Party of Five	"The Wedding"	Jeremy J. Gordon, Charlie Shepard, Amy Morrison, Harry Cheney, Rich Tavtigian, Don Sanders, Timothy Pearson	Fox
1996 (48th)	Sliders	"Invasion"	Kyle Wright, Norval D. Crutcher III, Steve Burger, Lydian Tone, Michael Gollom, Laura Macias, Sharon Michaels, Fernand Bos	Fox
1996 (48th)	Strange Luck	"The Liver Wild"	Andrew Spencer Dawson, Stacey Nakasone, Rich Cusano, Richard Webb	Fox
1997 (49th)
1997 (49th)	The X-Files	"Tempus Fugit"	Thierry J. Couturier, Stuart Calderon, Ira Leslie, Maciek Malish, Debby Ruby-Winsberg, Chris Fradkin, H. Jay Levine, Christopher B. Reeves, Susan Welsh, Jeff Charbonneau, Gary Marullo, Michael Salvetta	Fox
1997 (49th)	The Cape	"Pilot"	Richard Taylor, Kenneth L. Johnson, Linda Keim, Brian Thomas Nist, Barbara Issak, Eric Erickson, James Hebenstreit, Peter Bergren	Syndicated
1997 (49th)	Chicago Hope	"The Day of the Rope"	Mark Cookson, Dave Weathers, Doug Kent, Kim Naves, David Beadle, Robert Moore, David Grecu, Jane Boegel, Tom Scurry, Daniel Tripoli	CBS
1997 (49th)	Nash Bridges	"Zodiac"	Albert Ibbotson, Steffan Falesitch, David M. Cowan, Charlie Shepard, Jonathan Golodner, Carmine Rubino, Timothy Pearson, Matthew Dettmann, Dino A. Moriana	CBS
1997 (49th)	Profiler	"Cruel and Unusual"	Peter Austin, Michael Babcock, Linda Keim, Kenneth L. Johnson, Paul Longstaffe, Warren Smith, Kim Naves	NBC
1998 (50th)
1998 (50th)	ER	"Exodus"	Walter Newman, Darren Wright, Rick Camera, Darleen Stoker, Catherine Flynn, Thomas A. Harris, Michael Dittrick, Casey J. Crabtree, James Bailey	NBC
1998 (50th)	Millennium	"Owls"	Mark R. Crookston, Maciek Malish, Gabrielle Gilbert Reeves, Ken Gladden, Debby Ruby-Winsberg, Donna Beltz, Michael Kimball, Susan Welsh, Jarmil Maupin, Jeff Charbonneau, Michael Salvetta, Gary Marullo	Fox
1998 (50th)	Soldier of Fortune, Inc.	"Last Chance"	Matt Sawelson, Dennis Gray, Bradley C. Katona, Jason W. Jennings, Eric A. Norris, Myron Nettinga, Joe Earle, Ron Evans, Nancy Parker, Ginger Geary, Michael Baber	Syndicated
1998 (50th)	The Visitor	"Pilot"	Cindy Rabideau, Mark Cleary, Rick Hinson, Raymond E. Spiess III, Ray Spiess, Robert Guastini, Anna MacKenzie, William H. Angarola, Jay B. Richardson, James Moriana, Michael Broomberg	Fox
1998 (50th)	The X-Files	"The Red and the Black"	Thierry J. Couturier, Maciek Malish, H. Jay Levine, Gabrielle Gilbert Reeves, Mike Goodman, Ira Leslie, Chris Fradkin, Rick Hinson, Michael Kimball, Jeff Charbonneau, Gary Marullo, Michael Salvetta	Fox
1999 (51st)
1999 (51st)	ER	"The Storm, Part 2"	Walter Newman, Darren Wright, Rick Camera, Darleen Stoker, Bruce M. Honda, Thomas A. Harris, Rick Hromadka, Sharyn Gersh, Casey J. Crabtree, James Bailey	NBC
1999 (51st)	Buffy the Vampire Slayer	"Lovers Walk"	Cindy Rabideau, Robert Guastini, Mark Cleary, Mike Marchain, Anna MacKenzie, William H. Angarola, Rick Hinson, Ray Spiess, Fernand Bos, Zane D. Bruce, Joseph T. Sabella	The WB
1999 (51st)	The Pretender	"At the Hour of Our Death"	Thomas DeGorter, David Melhase, James A. Williams, Warren Smith, Tiffany S. Griffith, Christopher Briles, Andrew Ellerd, Bradley C. Katona, Gary Krause, Mark Kamps, Patricia Nedd, Dominique Decaudain	NBC
1999 (51st)	The Sopranos	"I Dream of Jeannie Cusamano"	Ray Spiess, William H. Angarola, Robert Guastini, Benjamin Beardwood, Anna MacKenzie, Mike Marchain, Rick Hinson, Bruce Swanson, Mark Cleary, Cindy Rabideau, Kathryn Dayak, Zane D. Bruce, Joseph T. Sabella	HBO
1999 (51st)	The X-Files	"Triangle"	Thierry J. Couturier, Stuart Calderon, Mike Goodman, H. Jay Levine, Maciek Malish, George Nemzer, Cecilia Perna, Christopher B. Reeves, Gabrielle Gilbert Reeves, Jeff Charbonneau, Gary Marullo, Michael Salvetta	Fox

=== 2000s ===
Year	Program	Episode	Nominees	Network
2000 (52nd)
2000 (52nd)	Third Watch	"Welcome to Camelot"	Walter Newman, Thomas A. Harris, Clayton Collins, Darleen Stoker, Karyn Foster, Darren Wright, Kenneth Young, Rick Camera, Rick Hromadka, Allan K. Rosen, Casey J. Crabtree, Michael Crabtree	NBC
2000 (52nd)	ER	"All in the Family"	Walter Newman, Thomas A. Harris, John F. Reynolds, Darren Wright, Rick Camera, Darleen Stoker, Virginia Cook-McGowan, Sharyn Gersh, Casey J. Crabtree, Michael Crabtree	NBC
2000 (52nd)	The Others	"Eyes"	Mace Matiosian, Ruth Adelman, Guy Tsujimoto, Harry Cohen, Jivan Tahmizian, Diane Griffen, Zane D. Bruce, Michael Broomberg	NBC
2000 (52nd)	Star Trek: Voyager	"Equinox, Part 2"	Bill Wistrom, James Wolvington, Ashley Harvey, Dale Chaloukian, Jeff Gersh, Masanobu 'Tomi' Tomita, Gerry Sackman	UPN
2000 (52nd)	The X-Files	"First Person Shooter"	Thierry J. Couturier, Cecilia Perna, Debby Ruby-Winsberg, Donna Beltz, H. Jay Levine, Ken Gladden, Michael Kimball, Stuart Calderon, Susan Welsh, Jeff Charbonneau, Michael Salvetta, Sharon Michaels	Fox
2001 (53rd)
2001 (53rd)	ER	"The Crossing"	Walter Newman, Darren Wright, Rick Hromadka, David Werntz, Constance A. Kazmer, Lou Kleinman, Darleen Stoker, Thomas A. Harris, Sharyn Gersh, Casey J. Crabtree, Michael Crabtree	NBC
2001 (53rd)	CSI: Crime Scene Investigation	"$35K O.B.O."	Mace Matiosian, David F. Van Slyke, Jivan Tahmizian, Ruth Adelman, Stan Jones, Zane D. Bruce, Joseph T. Sabella	CBS
2001 (53rd)	The Fugitive	"Pilot"	Michael E. Lawshe, Timothy A. Cleveland, Rick Camera, Otis Van Osten, David M. Horton, Bruce M. Honda, Jessica Goodwin, Eric Hertsguaard, Nancie Araki, Chris McGeary, Casey J. Crabtree, Michael Crabtree	CBS
2001 (53rd)	Star Trek: Voyager	"Endgame, Part 2"	Bill Wistrom, James Wolvington, Ashley Harvey, Masanobu 'Tomi' Tomita, Dale Chaloukian, Gerry Sackman	UPN
2001 (53rd)	Third Watch	"Honor"	Walter Newman, John F. Reynolds, Rick Hromadka, Darren Wright, David Werntz, Marc Mailand, Darleen Stoker, Constance A. Kazmer, Lou Kleinman, Allan K. Rosen, Casey J. Crabtree, Michael Crabtree	NBC
2002 (54th)
2002 (54th)	Smallville	"Pilot"	Michael E. Lawshe, Timothy A. Cleveland, Paul J. Diller, Adam Johnston, Otis Van Osten, Andrew Somers, Karyn Foster, Jessica Goodwin, Karen Spangenberg, Chris McGeary, Casey J. Crabtree, Michael Crabtree	The WB
2002 (54th)	CSI: Crime Scene Investigation	"Chasing the Bus"	Mace Matiosian, David F. Van Slyke, Ruth Adelman, Jivan Tahmizian, Sheri Ozeki, Zane D. Bruce, Joseph T. Sabella	CBS
2002 (54th)	ER	"Partly Cloudy, Chance of Rain"	Walter Newman, Thomas A. Harris, Darleen Stoker, Virginia Cook-McGowan, Darren Wright, Kenneth Young, Rick Hromadka, David Werntz, Karen Spangenberg, Sharyn Gersh, Casey J. Crabtree, Michael Crabtree	NBC
2002 (54th)	Star Trek: Enterprise	"Broken Bow"	Bill Wistrom, James Wolvington, Ashley Harvey, Masanobu 'Tomi' Tomita, Dale Chaloukian, Shaun Varney, Stephen M. Rowe, Hilda Hodges, Katherine Rose	UPN
2002 (54th)	Third Watch	"Falling"	Walter Newman, John F. Reynolds, Darleen Stoker, Constance A. Kazmer, Scott A. Tinsley, David Werntz, Catherine Flynn, Allan K. Rosen, Casey J. Crabtree, Michael Crabtree	NBC
2003 (55th)
2003 (55th)	CSI: Crime Scene Investigation	"Fight Night"	Mace Matiosian, David F. Van Slyke, Ruth Adelman, Jivan Tahmizian, Sheri Ozeki, Joseph T. Sabella, Zane D. Bruce	CBS
2003 (55th)	Alias	"Phase One"	Thomas DeGorter, Christopher B. Reeves, Mark Allen, Jay Keiser, Stephen M. Davis, Joseph T. Sabella, Zane D. Bruce	ABC
2003 (55th)	ER	"Chaos Theory"	Walter Newman, Thomas A. Harris, Darleen Stoker, Rick Hromadka, Darren Wright, Kenneth Young, David Werntz, Sharyn Gersh, Casey J. Crabtree, Michael Crabtree	NBC
2003 (55th)	Third Watch	"The Price of Nobility"	Walter Newman, John F. Reynolds, Catherine Flynn, Constance A. Kazmer, Rick Hromadka, Darren Wright, Kenneth Young, David Werntz, Karen Spangenberg, Nicholas Viterelli, Casey J. Crabtree, Michael Crabtree	NBC
2003 (55th)	24	"10:00 p.m. – 11:00 p.m."	William Dotson, Cathie Speakman, Jeffrey R. Whitcher, Pembrooke Andrews, Jeff Charbonneau, Laura Macias, Vince Nicastro	Fox
2004 (56th)
2004 (56th)	Deadwood	"Deadwood"	Larry Mann, Stephen Hunter Flick, Mark Larry, Benjamin L. Cook, Takako Ishikawa, Samuel C. Crutcher, Devin Joseph, Kevin Wahrman, Carmine Rubino, Micha Liberman, Amy Kane, Anita Cannella	HBO
2004 (56th)	Alias	"Resurrection"	Thomas DeGorter, Christopher B. Reeves, Mark Allen, Stephen M. Davis, Patrick Cabral, Cynthia Merrill	ABC
2004 (56th)	ER	"Drive"	Walter Newman, Thomas A. Harris, Darleen Stoker, Rick Hromadka, Darren Wright, Kenneth Young, Constance A. Kazmer, Karen Spangenberg, David Werntz, Sharyn Gersh, Casey J. Crabtree, Michael Crabtree	NBC
2004 (56th)	24	"12:00 a.m. – 1:00 a.m."	William Dotson, Cathie Speakman, Pembrooke Andrews, Jeffrey R. Whitcher, Paul Menichini, Todd Morrissey, Shawn Kennelly, Jeff Charbonneau, Laura Macias, Vince Nicastro	Fox
2004 (56th)	The West Wing	"An Khe"	Walter Newman, Thomas A. Harris, Catherine Flynn, Rick Hromadka, Darren Wright, Gabrielle Gilbert Reeves, Rick Hammel, David Werntz, John F. Reynolds, Troy Hardy, Michael Crabtree, Casey J. Crabtree	NBC
2005 (57th)
2005 (57th)	24	"12:00 p.m. – 1:00 p.m."	William Dotson, Cathie Speakman, Pembrooke Andrews, Jeffrey R. Whitcher, Shawn Kennelly, Jeff Charbonneau, Laura Macias, Vince Nicastro	Fox
2005 (57th)	CSI: Crime Scene Investigation	"Down the Drain"	Mace Matiosian, Ruth Adelman, Jivan Tahmizian, David F. Van Slyke, Todd Niesen, Christine H. Luethje, Joseph T. Sabella, Zane D. Bruce	CBS
2005 (57th)	CSI: Miami	"Lost Son"	Ann Hadsell, Ruth Adelman, Bradley C. Katona, Todd Niesen, Skye Lewin, Zane D. Bruce, Joseph T. Sabella	CBS
2005 (57th)	Lost	"Pilot, Part 2"	Thomas DeGorter, Christopher B. Reeves, Gabrielle Gilbert Reeves, Trevor Jolly, Paul Menichini, Roland N. Thai, Marc Glassman, Maciek Malish, Troy Allen, Stephen M. Davis, Patrick Cabral, Cynthia Merrill	ABC
2005 (57th)	Smallville	"Commencement"	Michael E. Lawshe, Stuart Calderon, Timothy A. Cleveland, Paul J. Diller, Adam Johnston, Eric Erickson, Karyn Foster, Jessica Goodwin, Marc Meyer, David Werntz, Chris McGeary, Casey J. Crabtree, Michael Crabtree	The WB
2006 (58th)
2006 (58th)	Smallville	"Arrival"	Michael E. Lawshe, Timothy A. Cleveland, Paul J. Diller, Stuart Calderon, Jason Oliver, Jessica Goodwin, David M. Cowan, Chris McGeary, Casey J. Crabtree, Michael Crabtree	The WB
2006 (58th)	CSI: Crime Scene Investigation	"A Bullet Runs Through It, Part 1"	Mace Matiosian, Ruth Adelman, David F. Van Slyke, Jivan Tahmizian, Mark Allen, Troy Hardy, Zane D. Bruce, Joseph T. Sabella	CBS
2006 (58th)	ER	"Two Ships"	Walter Newman, Thomas A. Harris, Darleen Stoker, Rick Hromadka, Darren Wright, Kenneth Young, Bruce M. Honda, Sharyn Gersh, Casey J. Crabtree, Michael Crabtree	NBC
2006 (58th)	Supernatural	"Pilot"	Michael E. Lawshe, Timothy A. Cleveland, Paul J. Diller, Marc Meyer, David Lynch, Jessica Goodwin, Karyn Foster, Chris McGeary, David Lee Fein, Jody Thomas	The WB
2006 (58th)	24	"9:00 p.m. – 10:00 p.m."	William Dotson, Cathie Speakman, Pembrooke Andrews, Jeffrey R. Whitcher, Shawn Kennelly, Rick Polanco, Jeff Charbonneau, Laura Macias, Vince Nicastro	Fox
2007 (59th)
2007 (59th)	24	"10:00 p.m. – 11:00 p.m."	William Dotson, Cathie Speakman, Jeffrey R. Whitcher, Pembrooke Andrews, Shawn Kennelly, Rick Polanco, Vic Radulich, Jeff Charbonneau, Laura Macias, Vince Nicastro	Fox
2007 (59th)	Battlestar Galactica	"Exodus, Part 2"	Jack Levy, Daniel Colman, Vince Balunas, Michael Baber, Doug Madick, Richard Partlow	Syfy
2007 (59th)	CSI: Miami	"No Man's Land"	Tim Kimmel, Todd Niesen, Bradley C. Katona, Ruth Adelman, Skye Lewin, Zane D. Bruce, Joseph T. Sabella	CBS
2007 (59th)	ER	"Bloodline"	Walter Newman, Bob Redpath, Darleen Stoker, Karyn Foster, Kenneth Young, Adam Johnston, Sharyn Gersh, Casey J. Crabtree, Michael Crabtree	NBC
2007 (59th)	Lost	"A Tale of Two Cities"	Thomas DeGorter, Paula Fairfield, Carla Murray, Maciek Malish, Jay Keiser, Joseph Schultz, Geordy Sincavage, Alex Levy, Doug Reed, Cynthia Merrill	ABC
2007 (59th)	Smallville	"Zod"	Michael E. Lawshe, Jeremy J. Gordon, Eric Hertsguaard, Timothy A. Cleveland, Eric Erickson, Marc Meyer, Paul J. Diller, Chris McGeary, Casey J. Crabtree, Michael Crabtree	The CW
2008 (60th)
2008 (60th)	Smallville	"Bizarro"	Michael E. Lawshe, Norval D. Crutcher III, Jessica Goodwin, Timothy A. Cleveland, Marc Meyer, Paul J. Diller, Al Gomez, Casey J. Crabtree, Michael Crabtree, Chris McGeary	The CW
2008 (60th)	CSI: Crime Scene Investigation	"Cockroaches"	Mace Matiosian, Ruth Adelman, Jivan Tahmizian, David F. Van Slyke, Chad J. Hughes, Joseph T. Sabella, Zane D. Bruce, Troy Hardy	CBS
2008 (60th)	ER	"The War Comes Home"	Walter Newman, Bob Redpath, Darleen Stoker, Bruce M. Honda, Kenneth Young, Adam Johnston, Casey J. Crabtree, Michael Crabtree, Sharyn Gersh	NBC
2008 (60th)	Lost	"The Shape of Things to Come"	Thomas DeGorter, Paula Fairfield, Carla Murray, Maciek Malish, Joseph Schultz, Geordy Sincavage, Jay Keiser, James Bailey, Cynthia Merrill, Alex Levy	ABC
2008 (60th)	Supernatural	"Jus in Bello"	Michael E. Lawshe, Norval D. Crutcher III, Karyn Foster, Marc Meyer, Timothy A. Cleveland, Paul J. Diller, Al Gomez, Casey J. Crabtree, Michael Crabtree, Dino A. Moriana	The CW
2009 (61st)
2009 (61st)	Battlestar Galactica	"Daybreak, Part 2"	Daniel Colman, Jack Levy, Vince Balunas, Sam C. Lewis, Michael Baber, Doug Madick, Richard Partlow	Syfy
2009 (61st)	CSI: Crime Scene Investigation	"Mascara"	Mace Matiosian, Ruth Adelman, Jivan Tahmizian, David F. Van Slyke, Troy Hardy, Joseph T. Sabella, James Bailey	CBS
2009 (61st)	Smallville	"Bloodline"	Michael E. Lawshe, Jessica Goodwin, Norval D. Crutcher III, Timothy A. Cleveland, Paul J. Diller, Marc Meyer, Jenny Leite, Chris McGeary, Michael Crabtree, Al Gomez	The CW
2009 (61st)	Terminator: The Sarah Connor Chronicles	"Mr. Ferguson is Ill Today"	Jon Mete, Patrick J. Foley, Tim Farrell, David Werntz, Jerry Edemann, Michael Baber, Katherine Rose, Shelley Roden	Fox
2009 (61st)	24	"10:00 p.m. – 11:00 p.m."	William Dotson, Cathie Speakman, Jeffrey R. Whitcher, Pembrooke Andrews, Daryl Fontenault, Melissa Kennelly, Shawn Kennelly, Jeff Charbonneau, Laura Macias, Vince Nicastro	Fox

=== 2010s ===
Year	Program	Episode	Nominees	Network
2010 (62nd)
2010 (62nd)	24	"4:00 a.m. – 5:00 a.m."	William Dotson, Cathie Speakman, Pembrooke Andrews, Jeffrey R. Whitcher, Shawn Kennelly, Daryl Fontenault, Melissa Kennelly, Jeff Charbonneau, Laura Macias, Vince Nicastro	Fox
2010 (62nd)	Breaking Bad	"One Minute"	Nick Forshager, Kathryn Madsen, Mark Cookson, Cormac Funge, Jane Boegel, Jason Tregoe Newman, Gregg Barbanell, Dominique Decaudain	AMC
2010 (62nd)	Fringe	"White Tulip"	Paul Curtis, Rick Norman, Bruce Tanis, Paul Apelgren, Shelley Roden, Richard Partlow	Fox
2010 (62nd)	Lost	"The End"	Thomas DeGorter, Joseph Schultz, Paula Fairfield, Carla Murray, Maciek Malish, Jay Keiser, Geordy Sincavage, Mark Allen, Bob Kellough, Christopher B. Reeves, Gabrielle Gilbert Reeves, Alex Levy, Adam De Coster, James Bailey	ABC
2010 (62nd)	True Blood	"Beyond Here Lies Nothin'"	John Benson, Jason Krane, Christian Buenaventura, Stuart Martin, Bruno Coon, Zane D. Bruce, Jeff Gunn	HBO
2011 (63rd)
2011 (63rd)	Boardwalk Empire	"Boardwalk Empire"	Philip Stockton, Eugene Gearty, Fred Rosenberg, Marissa Littlefield, Steven Visscher, Jennifer L. Dunnington, Marko A. Costanzo	HBO
2011 (63rd)	CSI: NY	"Life Sentence"	Mark Relyea, Edmund J. Lachmann, David Barbee, Ruth Adelman, Kevin McCullough, Joshua Winget, Joseph T. Sabella, James Bailey	CBS
2011 (63rd)	Game of Thrones	"A Golden Crown"	Stefan Henrix, Tim Hands, Michelle McCormack, Steve Fanagan, Andy Kennedy, Jon Stevenson, Robin Whittaker, Caoimhe Doyle, Eoghan McDonnell	HBO
2011 (63rd)	Nikita	"Pandora"	George Haddad, Dale Chaloukian, Ruth Adelman, Chad J. Hughes, Ashley Revell, James Bailey, Joseph T. Sabella	The CW
2011 (63rd)	True Blood	"Hitting the Ground"	John Benson, Jason Krane, Christian Buenaventura, Steven Stuhr, Stuart Martin, Fred Judkins, Eduardo Ponsdomenech, Zane D. Bruce, Jeff Gunn	HBO
2011 (63rd)	The Walking Dead	"Days Gone Bye"	Walter Newman, Kenneth Young, Darleen Stoker, Jerry Edemann, Michael Baber, Hilda Hodges, David Lee Fein	AMC
2012 (64th)
2012 (64th)	Game of Thrones	"Blackwater"	Peter Brown, Kira Roessler, Tim Hands, Paul Aulicino, Stephen P. Robinson, Vanessa Lapato, Brett Voss, James Moriana, Jeffrey Wilhoit, David Klotz	HBO
2012 (64th)	Boardwalk Empire	"Gimcrack & Bunkum"	Fred Rosenberg, Jeffrey Stern, Ruy García, Annette Kudrak, Steven Visscher, Igor Nikolic, Reuben Simon, Roland Vajs, Marko A. Costanzo, George A. Lara	HBO
2012 (64th)	Breaking Bad	"Face Off"	Nick Forshager, Jason Tregoe Newman, Kathryn Madsen, Mark Cookson, Cormac Funge, Jane Boegel, Jeffrey Cranford, Dominique Decaudain, Gregg Barbanell	AMC
2012 (64th)	CSI: Miami	"Blown Away"	Tim Kimmel, Bradley C. Katona, Ruth Adelman, Todd Niesen, Skye Lewin, Joseph T. Sabella, James Bailey	CBS
2012 (64th)	The Walking Dead	"Beside the Dying Fire"	Jerry Ross, Lou Thomas, Tim Farrell, Phil Barrie, David Lee Fein, Hilda Hodges	AMC
2013 (65th)
2013 (65th)	Boardwalk Empire	"The Milkmaid's Lot"	Fred Rosenberg, Roland Vajs, Bill Orrico, Jeffrey Stern, Ruy García, Annette Kudrak, Steven Visscher, Marko A. Costanzo	HBO
2013 (65th)	Breaking Bad	"Dead Freight"	Nick Forshager, Kathryn Madsen, Jane Boegel, Mark Cookson, Cormac Funge, Jason Tregoe Newman, Jeffrey Cranford, Gregg Barbanell, Dominique Decaudain	AMC
2013 (65th)	Game of Thrones	"And Now His Watch Is Ended"	Tim Kimmel, Paula Fairfield, Tim Hands, Jed M. Dodge, Bradley C. Katona, David Klotz, Brett Voss, Jeffrey Wilhoit, James Moriana	HBO
2013 (65th)	Nikita	"Aftermath"	George Haddad, Ruth Adelman, Chad J. Hughes, Steve Papagiannis, Dale Chaloukian, Ashley Revell, James Bailey, Joseph T. Sabella	The CW
2013 (65th)	Vikings	"Trial"	Jane Tattersall, Steve Medeiros, David McCallum, Brent Pickett, Dale Sheldrake, Yuri Gorbachow, Goro Koyama, Andy Malcolm	History
2014 (66th)
2014 (66th)	Black Sails	"I."	Benjamin L. Cook, Iain Eyre, Susan Cahill, Jeffrey A. Pitts, Tim Tuchrello, Brett Voss, Michael Baber, Jeffrey Wilhoit, James Moriana	Starz
2014 (66th)	Boardwalk Empire	"White Horse Pike"	Fred Rosenberg, Roland Vajs, Bill Orrico, Annette Kudrack, Ruy Garcia, Jeffrey Stern, Steve Visscher, Mark Costanzo	HBO
2014 (66th)	Breaking Bad	"Felina"	Nick Forshager, Kathryn Madsen, Jason Tregoe Newman, Mark Cookson, Cormac Funge, Jane Boegel, Jeffrey Cranford, Tim Boggs, Gregg Barbanell, Dominique Decaudain	AMC
2014 (66th)	Game of Thrones	"The Watchers on the Wall"	Tim Kimmel, Jed M. Dodge, Tim Hands, Paula Fairfield, David Klotz, Bradley C. Katona, Brett Voss, Jeffrey Wilhoit, Dylan Tuomy-Wilhoit	HBO
2014 (66th)	The Walking Dead	"Too Far Gone"	Jerry Ross, Michael Baber, Tim Farrell, Lou Thomas, Clayton Weber, Joseph Tsai, Hilda Hodges, Jody Thomas, Catherine Harper	AMC
2015 (67th)
2015 (67th)	Game of Thrones	"Hardhome"	Tim Kimmel, Paula Fairfield, Bradley C. Katona, Paul Bercovitch, Tim Hands, David Klotz, Jeffrey Wilhoit, Dylan Tuomy-Wilhoit	HBO
2015 (67th)	Black Sails	"XVIII."	Benjamin L. Cook, Stefan Henrix, Susan Cahill, Jeffrey A. Pitts, Brett Voss, Michael Baber, Jeffrey Wilhoit, Dylan Tuomy-Wilhoit	Starz
2015 (67th)	Boardwalk Empire	"The Good Listener"	Fred Rosenberg, Bill Orrico, Roland Vajs, Ruy García, Jeffrey Stern, Annette Kudrak, Steven Visscher, Marko A. Costanzo	HBO
2015 (67th)	Gotham	"All Happy Families Are Alike"	George Haddad, Dale Chaloukian, Chad J. Hughes, Ashley Revell, Joseph T. Sabella	Fox
2015 (67th)	Marvel's Daredevil	"Speak of the Devil"	Lauren Stephens, Jordan Wilby, Joshua Chase, Christian Buenaventura, Greg Vines, Alicia Stevenson, Dawn Lunsford	Netflix
2015 (67th)	The Walking Dead	"Conquer"	Jerry Ross, Tim Farrell, Lou Thomas, Michael Baber, Joseph Tsai, Clayton Weber, Catherine Harper, Gregg Barbanell	AMC
2016; 68th)
2016; 68th)	Black Sails	"XX."	Benjamin L. Cook, Susan Cahill, Stefan Henrix, Jeffrey A. Pitts, Tim Tuchrello, Brett Voss, Michael Baber, Jeffrey Wilhoit, Dylan Tuomy-Wilhoit	Starz
2016; 68th)	Game of Thrones	"The Door"	Tim Kimmel, Tim Hands, Paul Bercovitch, Paula Fairfield, Bradley C. Katona, Michael Wabro, David Klotz, Brett Voss, Jeffrey Wilhoit, Dylan Tuomy-Wilhoit	HBO
2016; 68th)	Gotham	"Azrael"	George Haddad, Julius Altus, Chad J. Hughes, Dale Chaloukian, Ashley Revell, Joseph T. Sabella, Joan Rowe	Fox
2016; 68th)	Marvel's Daredevil	"New York's Finest"	Lauren Stephens, Jordan Wilby, Jonathan Golodner, Christian Buenaventura, Greg Vines, Zane Bruce, Lindsay Pepper	Netflix
2016; 68th)	Vikings	"The Last Ship"	Jane Tattersall, David McCallum, Dale Sheldrake, Steve Medeiros, Brennan Mercer, Yuri Gorbachow, Andy Malcolm, Goro Koyama	History
2017 (69th)
2017 (69th)	Stranger Things	"Chapter Eight: The Upside Down"	Bradley North, Craig Henighan, Jordan Wilby, Jonathan Golodner, Tiffany S. Griffth, Sam Munoz, David Klotz, Noel Vought, Ginger Geary	Netflix
2017 (69th)	Black Sails	"XXXVII."	Benjamin Cook, Stefan Henrix, Mike Szakmeister, Shaugnessy Hare, Tim Tuchrello, Brett Voss, Michael Baber, Jeffrey Wilhoit, Dylan Tuomy-Wilhoit	Starz
2017 (69th)	Gotham	"Destiny Calling"	George Haddad, Chad J. Hughes, Dale Chaloukian, David Barbee, Julie Altus, Ashley Revell, Joey Sabella, Joanie Rowe	Fox
2017 (69th)	Homeland	"America First"	Craig A. Dellinger, Ryne Gierke, Eric Raber, Shawn Kennelly, Jeff Charbonneau, Melissa Kennelly, Vince Nicastro	Showtime
2017 (69th)	Westworld	"The Bicameral Mind"	Thomas E. deGorter, Matthew Sawelson, Brian Armstrong, Fred Paragano, Mark Allen, Marc Glassman, Sebastian Visconti, Geordy Sincavage, Michael Head, Christopher Kaller, Rick Owens, Tara Blume Norton	HBO
2018 (70th)
2018 (70th)	Stranger Things	"Chapter Eight: The Mind Flayer"	Bradley North, Craig Henighan, Tiffany S. Griffth, Jordan Wilby, David Werntz, Antony Zeller, David Klotz, Zane Bruce, Lindsay Pepper	Netflix
2018 (70th)	Game of Thrones	"The Spoils of War"	Tim Kimmel, Paula Fairfield, Tim Hands, Paul Bercovitch, Bradley C. Katona, John Matter, Brett Voss, David Klotz, Jeffrey Wilhoit, Dylan T. Wilhoit	HBO
2018 (70th)	Homeland	"All In"	Craig A. Dellinger, Eric Raber, Ian Shedd, Ryne Gierke, Shawn Kennelly, Jeff Charbonneau, Melissa Kennelly, Vince Nicastro	Showtime
2018 (70th)	Star Trek: Discovery	"What's Past Is Prologue"	Jon Mete, Tim Farrell, Chris Assells, Matt Taylor, T. Ashley Harvey, Angelo Palazzo, Peter D. Lago, Chris Scarabosio, Matt Decker, Trevor Sperry, Ale Ulrich	CBS All Access
2018 (70th)	Westworld	"Akane No Mai"	Thomas E. deGorter, Brett Hinton, Chris Kahwaty, Fred Paragano, Brian Armstrong, Mark Allen, Marc Glassman, Allegra De Souza, Christopher Kaller, Michael Head, Jordan McClain, Geordy Sincavage, Tara Blume, Matt Salib, Rick Owens	HBO
2019 (71st)
2019 (71st)	Game of Thrones	"The Long Night"	Tim Kimmel, Tim Hands, Paula Fairfield, Bradley C. Katona, Paul Bercovitch, John Matter, David Klotz, Brett Voss, Jeffrey Wilhoit, Dylan T. Wilhoit	HBO
2019 (71st)	Better Call Saul	"Talk"	Nick Forshager, Kathryn Madsen, Matt Temple, Mark Cookson, Jane Boegel-Koch, Jason Newman, Jeff Cranford, Gregg Barbanell	AMC
2019 (71st)	Gotham	"I Am Bane"	George Haddad, Chad J. Hughes, Julie Altus, Ashley Revell, Joey Sabella, Rick Owens	Fox
2019 (71st)	Star Trek: Discovery	"Such Sweet Sorrow, Part 2"	Matthew E. Taylor, Tim Farrell, Mike Schapiro, Clayton Webber, Dan Kenyon, Rickley W. Dumm, Sean Heissinger, Bob Jackson, Matt Decker, Alyson Dee Moore, Chris Moriana	CBS All Access
2019 (71st)	Tom Clancy's Jack Ryan	"Pilot"	Benjamin Cook, Jon Wakeham, Hector Gika, David Esparza, Tim Tuchrello, Alex Levy, Brett Voss, Jeff Wilhoit, Dylan Tuomy-Wilhoit	Prime Video

=== 2020s ===
Year	Program	Episode	Nominees	Network
2020 (72nd)
2020 (72nd)	Stranger Things	"Chapter Eight: The Battle of Starcourt"	Craig Henighan, William Files, Ryan Cole, Kerry Dean Williams, Angelo Palazzo, Katie Halliday, David Klotz, Steve Baine	Netflix
2020 (72nd)	Better Call Saul	"Bagman"	Nick Forshager, Kathryn Madsen, Matt Temple, Todd Toon, Jeff Cranford, Jane Boegel, Jason Newman, Gregg Barbanell, Alex Ullrich	AMC
2020 (72nd)	The Boys	"The Name of the Game"	Wade Barnett, David Barbee, Mason Kopekian, Brian Dunlop, Ryan Briley, Chris Newlin, Christopher Brooks, Joe Sabella, Jesi Ruppel	Prime Video
2020 (72nd)	The Crown	"Aberfan"	Lee Walpole, Andy Kennedy, Saoirse Christopherson, Juraj Mravec, Tom Williams, Steve Little, Tom Stewart, Anna Wright, Catherine Thomas	Netflix
2020 (72nd)	Star Trek: Picard	"Et in Arcadia Ego, Part 2"	Matthew E. Taylor, Tim Farrell, Henry Cohen, Michael Schapiro, Sean Heissinger, Clay Weber, Moira Marquis, Stan Jones, Alyson Dee Moore, Chris Moriana	CBS All Access
2020 (72nd)	Westworld	"Parce Domine"	Sue Gamsaragan Cahill, Benjamin L. Cook, Shaughnessy Hare, Jane Boegel-Koch, Tim Tuchrello, Sara Bencivenga, Brendan Croxon, Adrian Medhurst, Christopher Kaller	HBO
2021 (73rd)
2021 (73rd)	Lovecraft Country	"Sundown"	Tim Kimmel, John Matter, Paula Fairfield, Bradley Katona, Brett Voss, Jeff Lingle, Jason Lingle, Jeffrey Wilhoit, Dylan Tuomy-Wilhoit	HBO
2021 (73rd)	The Falcon and the Winter Soldier	"One World, One People"	Matthew Wood, Bonnie Wild, James Spencer, Richard Quinn, Steve Slanec, Kimberly Patrick, Teresa Eckton, Frank Rinella, Devon Kelley, Larry Oatfield, Anele Onyekwere, Dan Pinder, Ronni Brown, Andrea Gard	Disney+
2021 (73rd)	The Mandalorian	"Chapter 13: The Jedi"	Matthew Wood, David Acord, Richard Quinn, James Spencer, Benjamin A. Burtt, J. R. Grubbs, Richard Gould, Stephanie McNally, Ronni Brown, Jana Vance	Disney+
2021 (73rd)	Star Trek: Discovery	"That Hope Is You, Part 1"	Matthew E. Taylor, Sean Heissinger, Tim Farrell, Harry Cohen, Michael Schapiro, Darrin Mann, Clay Weber, Moira Marquis, Alyson Dee Moore, Chris Moriana	Paramount+
2021 (73rd)	The Umbrella Academy	"The End of Something"	John Benson, Jason Krane, John Snider, AJ Shapiro, Dario Biscaldi, Lodge Worster, Lindsay Pepper, Zane D. Bruce	Netflix
2022 (74th)
2022 (74th)	Stranger Things	"Chapter Seven: The Massacre at Hawkins Lab"	Craig Henighan, Will Files, Ryan Cole, Korey Pereira, Angelo Palazzo, Katie Halliday, Ken McGill, Steven Baine, David Klotz, Lena Glikson-Nezhelskaya	Netflix
2022 (74th)	Better Call Saul	"Carrot and Stick"	Nick Forshager, Kathryn Madsen, Jane Boegel, Matt Temple, Marc Glassman, Jeff Cranford, Jason Tregoe Newman, Gregg Barbanell, Alex Ullrich	AMC
2022 (74th)	The Book of Boba Fett	"Chapter 6: From the Desert Comes a Stranger"	Matthew Wood, Bonnie Wild, David Acord, Angela Ang, Ryan Cota, Benjamin A. Burtt, David Collins, Alyssa Nevarez, Stephanie McNally, Margie O'Malley, Andrea Gard, Sean England	Disney+
2022 (74th)	Loki	"Journey into Mystery"	Matthew Wood, David Acord, Brad Semenoff, Steve Slanec, Kyrsten Mate, Adam Kopald, Joel Raabe, Anele Onyekwere, Ed Hamilton, Nashia Wachsman, Shelley Roden, John Roesch	Disney+
2022 (74th)	Star Trek: Picard	"Penance"	Matthew E. Taylor, Michael Schapiro, Sean Hessinger, Alex Pugh, Clay Weber, John Sanacore, Ben Schor, Katherine Harper, Ginger Geary	Paramount+
2022 (74th)	Star Trek: Strange New Worlds	"Memento Mori"	Matthew E. Taylor, Michael Schapiro, Kip Smedley, Clay Weber, John Sanacore, David Barbee, Matt Decker, Alyson Dee Moore, Rick Owens, Chris Moriana	Paramount+
2023 (75th)
2023 (75th)	The Last of Us	"When You're Lost in the Darkness"	Michael J. Benavente, Joe Schiff, Christopher Battaglia, Chris Terhune, Mitchell Lestner, Jacob Flack, Matt Yocum, Maarten Hofmeijer, Randy Wilson, Justin Helle, Davi Aquino, Stefan Fraticelli, Jason Charbonneau, William Kellerman	HBO
2023 (75th)	Andor	"The Eye"	David Acord, Margit Pfeiffer, Richard Quinn, Jonathan Greber, J.R. Grubbs, John Finklea, Shaun Farley, Shelley Roden, John Roesch	Disney+
2023 (75th)	The Boys	"The Instant White-Hot Wild"	Wade Barnett, Chris Kahwaty, Ryan Briley, Jeffrey A. Pitts, Pete Nichols, Christopher Brooks, James Howe, Joseph T. Sabella, Jesi Ruppell	Prime Video
2023 (75th)	House of the Dragon	"The Black Queen"	Al Sirkett, Tim Hands, Adele Fletcher, Paula Fairfield, David Klotz, Timeri Duplat, Mathias Schuster, Barnaby Smyth, Paula Boram	HBO
2023 (75th)	The Lord of the Rings: The Rings of Power	"Udûn"	Robert Stambler, Damian Del Borrello, Ailene Roberts, Stefanie Ng, Paula Fairfield, Chris Terhune, James Miller, Michael Baber, Jason Smith, Amy Barber, Jonathan Bruce	Prime Video
2023 (75th)	Stranger Things	"Chapter Nine: The Piggyback"	Craig Henighan, William Files, Jill Purdy, Lee Gilmore, Ryan Cole, Korey Pereira, Angelo Palazzo, Katie Halliday, David Klotz, Lena Glikson-Nezhelskaya, Ken McGill, Steve Baine	Netflix
2024 (76th)
2024 (76th)	Shōgun	"Broken to the Fist"	Brian J. Armstrong, Benjamin Cook, James Gallivan, John Creed, Ayako Yamauchi, Mark Hailstone, Ken Cain, Melissa Muik, Matt Salib, Sanaa Kelley	FX
2024 (76th)	Avatar: The Last Airbender	"Legends"	Tim Kimmel, Luke Gibleon, John Matter, Bradley C. Katona, Randy Wilson, Justin Helle, Micha Liberman, Stefan Fraticelli, Jason Charbonneau	Netflix
2024 (76th)	Fallout	"The Target"	Sue Gamsaragan Cahill, Daniel Colman, Joseph Fraioli, Jane Boegel-Koch, Sara Bencivenga, Jonathan Golodner, Karen Triest, Randall Guth, Christopher Kaller, Clint Bennet, Nancy Parker, Katie Rose	Prime Video
2024 (76th)	Star Trek: Strange New Worlds	"Hegemony"	Matthew E. Taylor, Michael Schapiro, Sean Heissinger, Kip Smedley, Ian Herzon, Deron Street, Clay Weber, John Sanacore, Matt Decker, Rick Owens, Jesi Ruppel	Paramount+
2024 (76th)	3 Body Problem	"Judgment Day"	Tim Kimmel, Paula Fairfield, John Matter, Tim Hands, Bradley C. Katona, Randy Wilson, Justin Helle, David Klotz, Stefan Fraticelli, Jason Charbonneau, William Kellerman	Netflix
2025 (77th)
2025 (77th)	The Last of Us	"Through the Valley"	Michael J. Benavente, Chris Terhune, Joe Schiff, Christopher Battaglia, Mitchell Lestner, Jacob Flack, Odin Benitez, James Miller, Randy Wilson, Justin Helle, Ron Mellegers, Maarten Hofmeijer, Stefan Fraticelli, Brandon Bak, Jason Charbonneau	HBO
2025 (77th)	Andor	"Who Are You?"	David Acord, Margit Pfeiffer, James Spencer, Josh Gold, Alyssa Nevarez, John Finklea, Ronni Brown, Sean England	Disney+
2025 (77th)	The Pitt	"7:00 P.M."	Bryan Parker, Kristen Hirlinger, Vince Tennant, Josh Adeniji, Roland Thai, Sam Lewis, Lyndsey Schenk, Nicholas Kmet, Adam DeCoster, Alex Ullrich	HBO Max
2025 (77th)	Severance	"Chikhai Bardo"	Jacob Ribicoff, Gregg Swiatlowski, Eric Strausser, Sam Zeines, Felipe Pacheco, Marko Costanzo, Alex Wang	Apple TV+
2026 (78th)
2026 (78th)	Spider-Noir	"The Man in the Mask"	Ethan Beigel, Andy Sisul, Will Digby, Ryan Collins, Arielle McGrail, Caitlin Lutenske, DeVaughn Watts, Sanaa Kelley, Matt Salib	MGM+ / Prime Video
2026 (78th)	Alien: Earth	"Neverland"	Lee Gilmore, Bradley North, Chris Terhune, Nolan McNaughton, Justin M. Davey, Byron Wilson, Tim Walston, Matt "Smokey" Cloud, Beso Kacharava, Ben Schor, Biko Gogaladze	FX
2026 (78th)	The Boys	"Blood and Bone"	Wade Barnett, Ryan Briley, Russell Topal, Luis Galdames, Lisle Engle, Christopher Brooks, Joe Sabella, Jesi Ruppel	Prime Video
2026 (78th)	Fallout	"The Strip"	Sue Gamsaragan Cahill, Daniel Colman, Joseph Fraioli, Jane Boegel-Koch, Sara Bencivenga, James Parnell, Randall Guth, Christopher Kaller, Pamela Kahn, Dominique Decaudain, Alex Ullrich	Prime Video
2026 (78th)	Stranger Things	"Chapter Eight: The Rightside Up"	Craig Henighan, William Files, Dave Grimaldi, Lee Gilmore, Ryan Cole, Polly McKinnon, Emma Present, Angelo Palazzo, Katie Halliday, Christopher Bonis, Nick Interlandi, Matt "Smokey" Cloud, Gina Wark, Lena Glikson, David Klotz, Steve Baine	Netflix

== Individuals with multiple awards ==
8 awards

- Casey J. Crabtree

6 awards

- David Klotz
- Jeffrey Wilhoit
- Bill Wistrom

5 awards

- Jeff Charbonneau
- Michael Crabtree
- Doug Grindstaff
- Thomas A. Harris
- Mace Matiosian
- Walter Newman
- Brett Voss
- James Wolvington

4 awards

- Rick Camera
- Wilson Dyer
- Darleen Stoker
- Dylan Tuomy-Wilhoit
- Darren Wright

3 awards

- Pembrooke Andrews
- Michael Baber
- James Bailey
- Zane D. Bruce
- Bradley C. Katona
- Timothy A. Cleveland
- Benjamin L. Cook
- Paul J. Diller
- William Dotson
- Paula Fairfield
- Tony Garber
- Jessica Goodwin
- Tim Hands
- Craig Henighan
- Rick Hromadka
- Al Kajita
- Shawn Kennelly
- Tim Kimmel
- Michael E. Lawshe
- Laura Macias
- Chris McGeary
- Vince Nicastro
- Richard Raderman
- Joe Sabella
- Gerry Sackman
- Hank Salerno
- Larry Singer
- Cathie Speakman
- Jeffrey R. Whitcher

2 awards

- William Andrews
- Paul Bercovitch
- Susan Cahill
- Stuart Calderon
- Marko A. Costanzo
- Thierry J. Couturier
- Don Crosby
- Mark Dennis
- Catherine Flynn
- Karyn Foster
- George Fredrick
- Sharyn Gersh
- Tiffany S. Griffth
- Eileen Horta
- Samuel Horta
- Don Isaacs
- Constance A. Kazmer
- Marvin I. Kosberg
- Ira Leslie
- Maciek Malish
- John Matter
- James Moriana
- Bradley North
- Jeffrey A. Pitts
- Christopher B. Reeves
- Allan K. Rosen
- Fred Rosenberg
- Debby Ruby-Winsberg
- John Stacy
- Josef von Stroheim
- Tim Tuchrello
- Steven Visscher
- Bob Weatherford
- Susan Welsh
- David Werntz
- Jordan Wilby
- Michael D. Wilhoit

== Programs with multiple awards ==
4 awards

- ER
- Star Trek: The Next Generation
- Stranger Things

3 awards

- Game of Thrones
- Hill Street Blues
- Smallville
- 24

2 awards

- Black Sails
- Boardwalk Empire
- The Last of Us
- The X-Files

== Programs with multiple nominations ==
Totals combined for programs also nominated for Sound Editing for a Comedy or Drama Series (Half-Hour) and Animation.

11 nominations

- ER

8 nominations

- Game of Thrones

7 nominations

- CSI: Crime Scene Investigation
- Star Trek: The Next Generation
- 24

6 nominations

- Smallville
- Stranger Things
- The X-Files

5 nominations

- Boardwalk Empire
- Hill Street Blues

4 nominations

- Black Sails
- Breaking Bad
- Gotham
- Lost
- Third Watch
- The Walking Dead

3 nominations

- Airwolf
- Better Call Saul
- The Boys
- CSI: Miami
- Hunter
- Northern Exposure
- Quantum Leap
- Star Trek: Discovery
- Westworld
- Wiseguy

2 nominations

- Alias
- Andor
- Battlestar Galactica
- Beauty and the Beast
- Dr. Quinn, Medicine Woman
- Fallout
- Homeland
- The Last of Us
- Law & Order
- MacGyver
- The Mandalorian
- Marvel's Daredevil
- Miami Vice
- Nikita
- Police Story
- Ripley's Believe It or Not!
- St. Elsewhere
- Star Trek: Picard
- Star Trek: Strange New Worlds
- Star Trek: Voyager
- Supernatural
- True Blood
- Twin Peaks
- The Undersea World of Jacques Cousteau
- Vikings
