= HPA Award for Outstanding Sound – Television =

Annual award given by the Hollywood Professional Association

The HPA Award for Outstanding Sound – Television is an annual award, given by the Hollywood Professional Association (HPA), to post-production workers in the film and television industry, in this case sound. It was first awarded in 2006 and has been presented every year since. From 2006 to 2009, the category was titled HPA Award for Outstanding Audio Post – Television.

== Winners and nominees ==
=== 2000s ===
Outstanding Audio Post – Television

Year	Program	Episode(s)	Nominees	Network
2006	Charmed	"Gone with the Witches"	Greg Stacy, Mark Petersen, Michael P. Cook, Craig A. Dellinger, Jeff Clark	The WB
2006	Ned's Declassified School Survival Guide	"Substitute Teachers & The New Kid"	Greg Stacy, Mark Petersen, Michael P. Cook, Mike Hickey, Jeff Clark	Nickelodeon
2006	Squirrel Boy		Michael Geisler, Curt Hackney, Vince Colavitti, Glenn Aulepp	Cartoon Network
2007	CSI: Crime Scene Investigation	"Living Doll"	Ruth Adelman, Jivan Tahmizian, William Smith, Yuri Reese, Chad J. Hughes, Mace Matiosian	CBS
2007	The Company	"Episode 2"	David B. Cohn, Nello Torri, Alan Decker	TNT
2007	The Sopranos	"The Blue Comet"	Kevin Patrick Burns, Todd Orr, Jason George, Tim Boggs, Jed M. Dodge	HBO
2008	CSI: Crime Scene Investigation	"Cockroaches"	David F. Van Slyke, Ruth Adelman, Jivan Tahmizian, William Smith, Yuri Reese, Mace Matiosian	CBS
2008	John Adams	"Don't Tread on Me"	Marc Fishman, Tony Lamberti, Stephen Hunter Flick, Vanessa Lapato	HBO
2008	The Haunting Hour: Don't Think About It		Sam Kaufmann, Jon Schell	Cartoon Network
2009	Fringe	"Unleashed"	Thomas A. Harris, Michael Ferdie, Christopher B. Reeves, Mark D. Fleming, Tom E. Dahl	Fox
2009	CSI: Crime Scene Investigation	"Mascara"	David F. Van Slyke, Ruth Adelman, Jivan Tahmizian, William Smith, Yuri Reese, Mace Matiosian	CBS
2009	Lost	"The Incident: Part 1"	Thomas DeGorter, Paula Fairfield, Carla Murray, Scott Weber, Frank Morrone	ABC

=== 2010s ===
Outstanding Sound – Television

Year	Program	Episode(s)	Nominees	Network
2010	House	"Help Me"	Brad North (supervising sound editor), Luis Galdames (sound effects editor), Jackie Rodman (dialogue editor), Joe DeAngelis (re-recording mixer)	Fox
2010	Fringe	"White Tulip"	Paul Curtis (supervising sound editor); Bruce Tanis (sound designer/sound effects editor); Rick Norman, Brian Harman (re-recording mixers)	Fox
2010	Glee	"Preggers"	John Benson, Gary Megregian (supervising sound editors); Todd Murakami (sound effects editor); Jason Krane, Christian Buenaventura (dialogue editors)	Fox
2010	Lost	"The End"	Thomas DeGorter (supervising sound editor); Paula Fairfield, Carla Murray (sound designers/sound effects editors) Alex Levy (music editor); Maciek Malish (dialogue editor); Frank Morrone, Scott Weber (re-recording mixers)	ABC
2010	True Blood	"Beyond Here Lies Nothin'"	John Benson (supervising sound editor), Jason Krane (dialogue/adr editor), Christian Buenaventura (dialogue editor), Stuart Martin (sound effects editor), Bruno Coon (music editor)	HBO
2011	House	"Bombshells"	Brad North (supervising sound editor), Luis Galdames (sound effects editor), Jackie Rodman (dialogue editor), Joe DeAngelis (re-recording mixer)	Fox
2011	Detroit 1-8-7	"Legacy / Drag City"	Walter Newman (supervising sound editor); Darleen Stoker (dialogue editor); Kenneth Young (sound supervisor); Mark D. Fleming, Tom E. Dahl (re-recording mixers)	ABC
2011	Downton Abbey	"Episode One"	Adam Armitage (sound effects editor), Alex Sawyer (dialogue editor), Stuart Bagshaw (foley editor), Nigel Heath (re-recording mixer), Oliver Brierley (adr mixer)	PBS
2011	Falling Skies	"Prisoner of War"	G. Michael Graham (supervising sound editor); Mark D. Fleming, Tom E. Dahl (re-recording mixers)	TNT
2011	Too Big to Fail		Michael Kirchberger (supervising sound editor/dialogue editor); Chris Jenkins, Bob Beemer (re-recording mixers)	HBO
2012	Grimm	"Pilot"	Mark Lanza, Larry Mann (supervising sound editors); Alan Decker, Nello Torri (re-recording mixers)	NBC
2012	Hatfields & McCoys	"Part 3"	Christian Cooke, Brad Zoern (re-recording mixers)	History
2012	Homeland	"Marine One"	Craig A. Dellinger (supervising sound editor); Jonathan Golodner (sound effects editor); Larry Goeb (dialogue editor); Alan Decker, Nello Torri (re-recording mixers)	Showtime
2012	Person of Interest	"Matsya Nyaya"	Thomas DeGorter, Matt Sawelson (supervising sound editors); Scott Weber, Keith Rogers (re-recording mixer)	CBS
2012	The Walking Dead	"Beside the Dying Fire"	Lou Thomas (sound designer/supervising sound editor); Jerry Ross (supervising sound editor); Tim Farrell, Phil Barrie (sound effects editors); Gary D. Rogers, Dan Hiland (re-recording mixers); Bartek Swiatek (production sound mixer)	AMC
2013	Game of Thrones	"The Climb"	Tim Kimmel (supervising sound editor); Paula Fairfield (sound designer); Bradley C. Katona (sound effects editor); Jed M. Dodge (dialogue editor); Onnalee Blank, Mathew Waters (re-recording mixers)	HBO
2013	The Americans	"Mutually Assured Destruction"	Ken Hahn (supervising sound editor/re-recording mixer), Neil Cedar (supervising sound editor), James David Redding III (re-recording mixer)	FX
2013	Banshee	"Pilot"	Brad North (supervising sound editor); Luis Galdames (sound effects editor); Tiffany S. Griffith (dialogue editor); William Freesh, Elmo Ponsdomenech (re-recording mixers)	Cinemax
2013	Dexter	"A Beautiful Day"	Fred Judkins (supervising sound editor); John Snider (sound effects editor); Christian Buenaventura (dialogue editor); Pete Elia, Kevin Roache (re-recording mixers)	Showtime
2013	Homeland	"Beirut Is Back"	Craig A. Dellinger (supervising sound editor); Jonathan Golodner (sound effects editor); Alan Decker, Nello Torri (re-recording mixers); Larry Long (production sound mixer)	Showtime
2014	Toy Story of Terror!		Tom Myers (sound designer), Michael Silvers (supervising sound editor), Dustin Cawood (sound effects editor), Gary Summers (re-recording mixer), Axel Geddes (film editor)	ABC
2014	Banshee	"Homecoming"	Brad North (supervising sound editor); David Werntz (sound designer); Tiffany S. Griffith (dialogue editor); Joe DeAngelis, William Freesh (re-recording mixers)	Cinemax
2014	Game of Thrones	"The Children"	Tim Kimmel (supervising sound editor); Paula Fairfield (sound designer); Bradley C. Katona (sound effects editor); Jed M. Dodge (dialogue editor); Onnalee Blank, Mathew Waters (re-recording mixers)	HBO
2014	The Good Wife	"A Beautiful Day"	Fred Judkins (supervising sound editor); John Snider (sound effects editor); Christian Buenaventura (dialogue editor); Larry Benjamin, Kevin Valentine (re-recording mixers)	CBS
2014	House of Cards	"Chapter 14"	Jeremy Molod (supervising sound editor); Ren Klyce (sound designer); Jonathon Stevens (music editor); Nathan Nance, Scott R. Lewis (re-recording mixers)	Netflix
2015	Homeland	"Redux"	Craig A. Dellinger (supervising sound editor); Alan Decker, Nello Torri (re-recording mixers)	Showtime
2015	Banshee	"You Can't Hide from the Dead"	Brad North (supervising sound editor); David Werntz (sound designer); Tiffany S. Griffith (dialogue editor); Joe DeAngelis, Kenneth Kobett (re-recording mixers)	Cinemax
2015	Black Sails	"XVIII."	Benjamin L. Cook (supervising sound editor); Stefan Henrix (adr supervisor); Jeffrey A. Pitts (sound effects editor); Susan Cahill (supervising dialogue editor); Onnalee Blank, Mathew Waters (re-recording mixers)	Starz
2015	Game of Thrones	"Hardhome"	Tim Kimmel (supervising sound editor); Paula Fairfield (sound designer); Bradley C. Katona (sound effects editor); Paul Bercovitch (supervising dialogue editor); Onnalee Blank, Mathew Waters (re-recording mixers)	HBO
2015	Halt and Catch Fire	"SETI"	Susan Cahill (supervising sound editor); Mark Cleary, Kevin McCullough (sound effects editors); Jane Boegel (dialogue editor); Keith Rogers, Scott Weber (re-recording mixers)	AMC
2016	Outlander	"Prestonpans"	Vince Balunas (supervising sound editor); Alan Decker, Nello Torri (re-recording mixers); Brian Milliken (production sound mixer)	Starz
2016	Game of Thrones	"Battle of the Bastards"	Tim Kimmel (supervising sound editor); Paula Fairfield (sound designer); Bradley C. Katona (sound effects editor); Paul Bercovitch (supervising dialogue editor); Onnalee Blank, Mathew Waters (re-recording mixers)	HBO
2016	House of Cards	"Chapter 45"	Jeremy Molod (supervising sound editor); Ren Klyce (sound designer); Jonathon Stevens (music editor); Nathan Nance, Scott R. Lewis (re-recording mixers)	Netflix
2016	Marco Polo	"One Hundred Eyes"	Tim Kimmel (supervising sound editor); Paula Fairfield (sound designer); Bradley C. Katona (sound effects editor); Paul Bercovitch (supervising dialogue editor); Onnalee Blank, Mathew Waters (re-recording mixers)	Netflix
2016	Preacher	"See"	Richard E. Yawn (supervising sound editor); Mark Linden, Tara A. Paul (re-recording mixers)	AMC
2017	American Gods	"The Bone Orchard"	Brad North (supervising sound editor); David Werntz (sound designer); Tiffany S. Griffith (dialogue editor); Joe DeAngelis, Kenneth Kobett (re-recording mixers)	Starz
2017	Stranger Things	"Chapter Eight: The Upside Down"	Craig Henighan (sound designer/supervising sound editor); Jordan Wilby (sound effects editor); Tiffany S. Griffith (dialogue editor); Joe Barnett, Adam Jenkins (re-recording mixers)	Netflix
2017	Game of Thrones	"The Spoils of War"	Tim Kimmel (supervising sound editor); Paula Fairfield (sound designer); Bradley C. Katona (sound effects editor); Paul Bercovitch (supervising dialogue editor); Onnalee Blank, Mathew Waters (re-recording mixers)	HBO
2017	The Music of Strangers		Pete Horner (supervising sound editor/re-recording mixer); Dimitri Tisseyre, Dennis Hamlin (production sound mixers)	HBO
2017	Underground	"Soldier"	Larry Goeb (supervising sound editor); Mark Linden, Tara A. Paul (re-recording mixers)	WGN
2018	Altered Carbon	"Out of the Past"	Brett Hinton (supervising sound editor); Mark Allen, Owen Granich-Young (sound effects editors); Andy King, Keith Rogers (re-recording mixers)	Netflix
2018	Dark	"Secrets"	Alexander Würtz (supervising sound editor); Achim Hofmann, Jörg Elsner (sound editors); Ansgar Frerich, Christian Bischoff (re-recording mixers)	Netflix
2018	Waco	"Operation Showtime"	Kelly Oxford (supervising sound editor); Karen Vassar Triest (sound designer); David Brownlow (production sound mixer); Beau Borders, Craig Mann, Laura Wiest (re-recording mixers)	Paramount Network
2018	Yellowstone	"Daybreak"	Alan Robert Murray (supervising sound editor); Tim LeBlanc, Dean A. Zupancic (re-recording mixers)	Paramount Network
2018	Yellowstone	"Kill the Messenger"	Alan Robert Murray (supervising sound editor); Tim LeBlanc, Dean A. Zupancic (re-recording mixers)	Paramount Network
2019	The Haunting of Hill House	"Two Storms"	Trevor Gates (supervising sound editor), Jason Dotts (supervising dialogue editor), Paul B. Knox (sound effects editor), Walter Spencer (foley artist), Jonathan Wales (re-recording mixer)	Netflix
2019	Chernobyl	"1:23:45"	Joe Beal (sound designer), Stefan Henrix (supervising sound editor), Michael Maroussas (dialogue editor), Harry Barnes (adr supervisor), Stuart Hilliker (re-recording mixer)	HBO
2019	Deadwood: The Movie		Benjamin L. Cook (sound designer); Mandell Winter (sound supervisor); Daniel Colman (supervising sound effects editor); Micha Liberman (music editor); John W. Cook II, William Freesh (re-recording mixers)	HBO
2019	Game of Thrones	"The Bells"	Paula Fairfield (sound designer); Tim Kimmel (supervising sound editor); David Klotz (music editor); Onnalee Blank, Mathew Waters (re-recording mixers)	HBO
2019	Homecoming	"Protocol"	Jeffrey A. Pitts (sound designer); Kevin W. Buchholz (supervising sound editor); Polly McKinnon (dialogue editor); Ben Zales (music editor); John W. Cook II, William Freesh (re-recording mixers)	Amazon

== Programs with multiple wins ==
2 awards

- CSI: Crime Scene Investigation (CBS)
- House (Fox)

== Programs with multiple nominations ==
6 nominations

- Game of Thrones (HBO)

3 nominations

- Banshee (Cinemax)
- CSI: Crime Scene Investigation (CBS)
- Homeland (Showtime)

2 nominations

- Fringe (Fox)
- Lost (ABC)
- House (Fox)
- House of Cards (Netflix)
- Yellowstone (Paramount Network)

== See also ==
- List of American television awards
