= Josef von Stroheim =

American sound editor (1922–2002)

- Born: September 18, 1922; Los Angeles, California, US
- Died: March 22, 2002 (aged 79); Van Nuys, California, US
- Burial place: Valhalla Memorial Park Cemetery
- Occupation: Sound editor
- Years active: 1954–1988
- Parents: Erich von Stroheim (father); Valerie Germonprez (mother)

Josef Erich von Stroheim (September 18, 1922 – March 22, 2002) was an American sound editor, known for his work in the motion picture industry. His father was director Erich von Stroheim.

== Early life ==
Josef Erich von Stroheim was born in Los Angeles on September 18, 1922, and grew up in Beverly Hills, California. His parents were actress Valerie Germonprez; and actor and film director, Erich von Stroheim. He had a half-brother, Erich von Stroheim Jr., from his father's second marriage to Mae Jones (or May Jones).

== Career ==
He began his career as a still photographer for Metro-Goldwyn-Mayer's publicity department in 1939. He enlisted into the United States Army in 1942 to fight in World War II and served as a combat photographer in Europe and Japan, where one of his subjects was Hideki Tojo.

After the war he was a member of the International Combat Camera Association and worked as a sound editor. He won two Emmy Awards for sound editing for QB VII (1977) and The Immortal (1970) as well as five Motion Picture Sound Editors Golden Reel Awards.

== Later life and death ==
Stroheim retired in 1988 and died in Van Nuys from complications from lung cancer on March 22, 2002. He is buried in an unmarked grave in Valhalla Memorial Park Cemetery.
