= Triangle (The X-Files) =

- The X-Files episode
- Episode no.: Season 6 Episode 3
- Directed by: Chris Carter
- Written by: Chris Carter
- Production code: 6ABX03
- Original air date: November 22, 1998
- Running time: 45 minutes

Guest appearances
- Mitch Pileggi as Walter Skinner/Nazi officer; William B. Davis as Cigarette Smoking Man/Nazi officer; Chris Owens as Jeffrey Spender/Nazi officer; Madison Mason as Captain Yip Harburg; James Pickens Jr. as Alvin Kersh/Jamaican crewman; Tom Braidwood as Melvin Frohike; Dean Haglund as Richard Langly; Bruce Harwood as John Fitzgerald Byers; Arlene Pileggi as Skinner's assistant; Laura Hughes as Kersh's assistant/girl singer

Episode chronology
← Previous "Drive"	Next → "Dreamland"
- The X-Files season 6

"Triangle" is the third episode of the sixth season of the American science fiction television series The X-Files. It premiered on the Fox network on November 22, 1998. Written and directed by series creator Chris Carter, "Triangle" is a "Monster-of-the-Week" episode, a stand-alone plot which is unconnected to the overarching mythology of The X-Files. "Triangle" earned a Nielsen household rating of 10.8, being watched by 18.20 million viewers in its initial broadcast. The episode generally received positive reviews with many critics commenting on the episode's directing style.

The show centers on FBI special agents Fox Mulder (David Duchovny) and Dana Scully (Gillian Anderson) who work on cases linked to the paranormal, called X-Files. Mulder is a believer in the paranormal, the skeptical Scully has been assigned to debunk his work and the two have developed a close friendship. In this episode, Mulder races to a luxury passenger liner which has mysteriously appeared in the Bermuda Triangle. Once there, he realizes he has traveled back in time to September 3, 1939—the outbreak of World War II. German soldiers have boarded the ship in search of "Thor's Hammer", something that could ensure victory in the coming conflict. Scully, after being informed of Mulder's disappearance by The Lone Gunmen, rushes through the J. Edgar Hoover Building, looking for someone who can help find her missing partner.

"Triangle" is filmed in a style inspired by the 1948 Alfred Hitchcock film Rope, with many scenes edited to appear as single takes. In addition, "Triangle" features the main and recurring cast members such as Anderson, William B. Davis, Chris Owens, James Pickens Jr. and Mitch Pileggi, who played their contemporary characters as well as distinctly different characters from 1939 on board the luxury liner. Several of the episode's themes have been critically examined, such as the concept of "dream-nazis", the appearance of modern characters portraying those from the past, and the ramification that the entire episode was a dream.

== Plot ==
Fox Mulder (David Duchovny) is pulled from the sea by the British crew of the SS Queen Anne after wrecking his raft. Mulder explains that the ship vanished in the Bermuda Triangle in 1939 and believes it has reappeared in 1998; however, the British claim he is a Nazi spy. Suddenly, the Queen Anne is boarded by SS troops led by an Oberführer resembling the Smoking Man (William B. Davis). When Mulder hears a radio broadcast announcing the start of World War II, he realizes that the ship has not traveled to 1998; he has traveled back to 1939.

In the present, the Lone Gunmen tell Dana Scully (Gillian Anderson) that they have lost contact with Mulder, who was searching for Queen Anne. After unsuccessfully seeking help from Walter Skinner (Mitch Pileggi) and Assistant Director Alvin Kersh (James Pickens Jr.), Scully obtains Mulder's location from Skinner and leaves with the Gunmen to find him. Meanwhile, Mulder learns that the Nazis are searching for "Thor's Hammer," which is actually a scientist expected to help develop a nuclear weapon. Mulder urges the crew to return to the Bermuda Triangle, hoping the ship can pass through the time rift and return to 1998.

After the Nazis capture Mulder, they take him to the ship's ballroom and order him to identify the scientist. A woman who resembles Scully defends him, and when the true scientist reveals himself, the Nazis prepare to execute their prisoners. Suddenly, British sailors attack the Nazis, allowing Mulder and "Scully" to escape with help from a Nazi officer resembling Skinner, who is apparently an Allied sympathizer. At the same time, the real Scully and the Gunmen board the Queen Anne in 1998, but find only an empty ghost ship, while Mulder and the passengers occupy a parallel version of the ship in 1939.

Mulder tells the woman who resembles Scully to turn the ship around and return to the Bermuda Triangle. He kisses her "in case [they] never meet again", whereupon she punches him and he jumps overboard. Mulder then awakens in a hospital back in 1998 surrounded by Scully, the Gunmen, and Skinner, all of whom dismiss his story as delirium. After the others leave, Mulder tells Scully that he loves her, but she assumes he is merely confused by painkillers. Mulder then discovers that the cheek where the 1939 counterpart of Scully punched him is still bruised, and he smiles knowingly.

== Production ==
=== Conception, writing, and filming ===
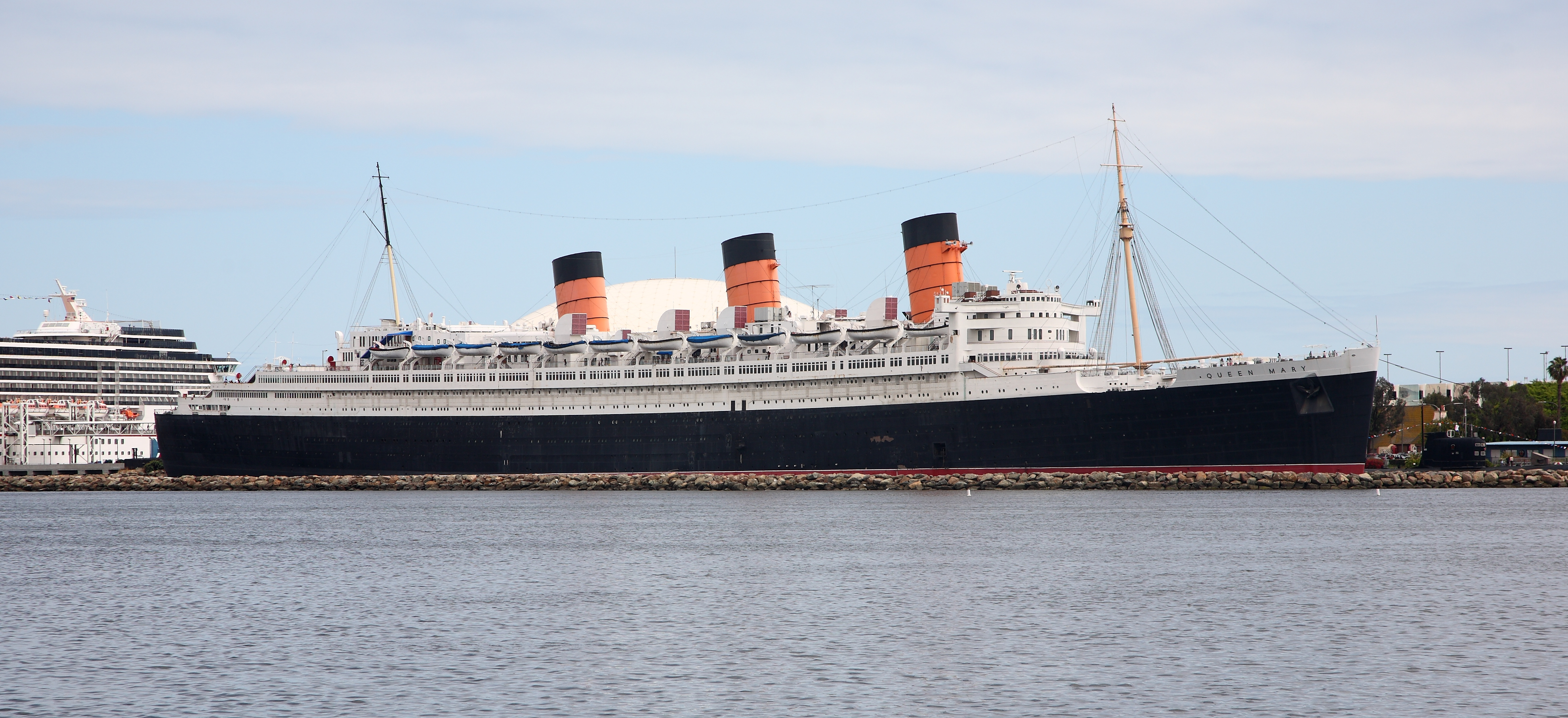
The scenes aboard the Queen Anne were actually filmed on board the RMS Queen Mary.

The X-Files creator Chris Carter developed the idea for "Triangle" while working on the fifth-season episode "The Red and the Black". While filming the episode, Carter used so much film that the crew made him a mock trophy. This, in turn, inspired him to write an episode that featured continuous action, thereby using as little film as possible. Carter designed "Triangle" in a style similar to Alfred Hitchcock's 1948 film Rope. Initially, Fox executives were hesitant to green-light production for "Triangle" because it was expected to exceed the $2.5 million episode budget. To persuade them, Carter told the executives that the episode would feature elements of Hitchcock's directing style, a move he later called "an easy hook". Carter also cited the 1964 Twilight Zone adaptation of "An Occurrence at Owl Creek Bridge" as inspiration.

The scenes taking place on the Queen Anne were filmed aboard the retired British ocean liner RMS Queen Mary, which is moored at Long Beach, California and currently serves as a hotel. Filming on board the ship took place over eleven days. To block out the lights of nearby Long Beach, The X-Files crew erected wrap-around scaffolding on the ship's bridge. To give the effect of rain during the scenes on the bridge, the crew installed large sprinkler systems that provided a constant supply of water. Unhappy with the remodeled style of the ship's corridors and ballroom, Carter had whole portions of the ship redesigned so that the finished episode would have a late-1930s feel.

For authenticity, several British and German actors portrayed the British sailors and Nazi soldiers, whose dialogue was mostly in German. Trevor Goddard, who portrayed the First British Crewman, is English, while Madison Mason, who played Captain Yip Harburg, is American; he affected an English accent for the part. William B. Davis' dialogue was entirely in German, a language which he did not speak. He later explained, "I certainly didn't realize I was going to be speaking a lot of German until I got the script, which just said 'CSM (in German)'." To successfully learn his lines, one of the German cast members recorded all of Davis' dialogue onto a cassette. Davis was given the cassette two weeks before shooting and phonetically memorized his lines; he noted that the method "seemed to work pretty well—at least to non-German-speaking people! It was a little more challenging because there were some real German speakers on the show, which I thought was a little unfair." Tom Braidwood, who played Lone Gunman Melvin Frohike and was an assistant director on the show, called Davis' role "brutal" and noted that "It was really tough for William because he had to learn all this German." Davis later joked that "Maybe we shouldn't try to do two clever things at once. I think it worked fine, but it was a struggle to do it." The only main cast member of The X-Files who already spoke German was Mitch Pileggi. Pileggi had studied in Germany; he had to re-write many of his lines as they made no sense in the context of the scenes. The tagline that usually appears after the opening credits of every episode, "The Truth is Out There", was translated into German: "Die Wahrheit ist irgendwo da draußen".

=== Directing style ===
Agent Scully crosses paths with Agent Mulder and the 1939 version of Scully. The sophisticated split-screen mise en scène was inspired by the music video for Semisonic's 1998 single "Closing Time."

Filmed in real time, the episode is designed to look like it was recorded in four uninterrupted eleven-minute takes. Carter explained, "I said [to the cast and crew] 'Wouldn't it be great since we have 44 minutes of programming time if we just did an episode where we did four 11-minute takes and put it all together?' And everyone looked at me like I was nuts." To film the episode, camera operator Dave Luckenbach wore a steadicam. The steadicam used could only hold a maximum of four minutes of film, so discreet edits and cuts were necessary. Luckenbach later likened the physical aftermath of filming to playing football, "You'd have a game on Friday, and you'd wake up Saturday and really feel it." The cuts were usually made during whip pans or in scenes when the screen would go dark. With the exception of Mulder jumping off the Queen Anne, the only noticeable editing occurs between scenes, when a side swipe shifts between the two different time periods. Many of the takes needed to be nearly perfect; for example, of the takes made on the eighth day of filming, only two of ten were deemed satisfactory. Both the cast and crew admitted that filming an episode of The X-Files in real time was physically and mentally exhausting. Duchovny later joked that, after filming concluded, he "could win an Emmy for most bruises." Gillian Anderson described the real time directing style as "challenging." She said, "I'm realizing how comfortable and connected I am to the rhythm we're used to."

In an interview before the episode was finished, Gillian Anderson said she was most looking forward to the scene in which Scully takes an elevator through FBI headquarters in her quest to locate Mulder. She later compared the episode to live theater, which she had worked in previously. During the filming of this scene, when the actors entered the stage elevator, the set that they would next move onto had to be constructed behind the closed doors. Many times during filming, these doors would open before the set behind had been completed, which ruined the shot. The final two acts of the episode feature a sophisticated split-screen mise en scène: Rather than displaying two different events, each side of the screen features the same setting, but with each side set during a different time period. When Scully runs around the corner in the present day, she does so at the same time as Mulder and the 1939 version of Scully. This was filmed in such a way that as the actors pass each other in the hallway, they also pass into the opposite frame of the split screen. This effect was inspired by the music video for Semisonic's hit 1998 single "Closing Time."

Editor Louise Innes, who was working on her first X-Files episode, said the post-production editing process was "not as easy as it sounds." Innes was tasked with connecting roughly forty shots and creating the illusion of one, uniform scene. After the reels of film were combined, several pending issues had to be tweaked in post-production. For instance, during the scene in which Scully runs into an elevator, two shots were spliced together, but the color did not completely match. The images and their colors were later corrected by the series' "postproduction [sic] troubleshooters" using digital manipulation. When the episode was filmed, it was shot in 2.35:1 widescreen. When the episode aired, it was shown letterboxed to fit in a 1.33:1 television screen; this was the first X-Files episode to receive this treatment. Carter reasoned that this method would allow for more action to be viewable in each frame.

=== Music and cultural references ===
To get a feel for the era, X-Files composer Mark Snow listened to the big band music of Tommy Dorsey, Harry James, Gene Krupa, and Glenn Miller. The "bouncy instrumental" that plays during the ballroom fight scene was inspired by a similar swing tune, written by John Williams, from the 1979 Steven Spielberg film 1941. Snow later joked that his composition was "the third generation of the same inspiration." Carter had significant musical input when it came to scene transitions, saying, "I got a chance to use some of my favorite '40s music here, too, or '30s and '40s music to transition scenes." Producer Paul Rabwin also supervised "a special arrangement" of the 1938 jazz standard "Jeepers Creepers", which was also included in the ballroom scene.

The episode contains many intentional references to the 1939 musical film The Wizard of Oz. The ship's captain is named after the film's lyricist Yip Harburg, and the ballroom singer, Almira Gulch, after The Wizard of Oz character who is the analog for the Wicked Witch of the West. Her band is The Lollipop Guild, a reference to a section of the song "Ding-Dong! The Witch Is Dead", while Mulder's wrecked ship is called the Lady Garland, after Judy Garland. The final scene of "Triangle", which features Mulder in bed telling his friends and co-workers that he saw them in his reverie, bears a striking resemblance to the closing scene of Oz. Because of this, the scene was called "obviously derivative" by one reviewer. Further, when Mulder mentions that Skinner was with him in 1939, which is the year The Wizard of Oz was released, Skinner replies "with my dog Toto", and Scully tells him "there's no place like home".

The episode features several historical errors. Anderson's 1939 character is said to work for the Office of Strategic Services, which was not established until 1942. The code name "Thor's Hammer" is an invention of the writers. Lee Smith, the official researcher for the show, was tasked with finding the name for the secret pre-World War II atomic research project. Unfortunately for the show, the actual code name, Development of Substitute Materials, was considered "uninspiring", so the name "Thor's Hammer" was created instead.

== Themes ==
Robert Shearman, in his book Wanting to Believe: A Critical Guide to The X-Files, Millennium & The Lone Gunmen, examined the characterization of the villains in the episode and the meta-references to the series. Shearman notes that the episode makes a distinct difference when portraying the Nazis on-screen. Instead of showing them as "real Nazis"—like those featured in the third-season episode "Paper Clip", among others—this episode portrays them as deliberately exaggerated "dream-nazis". The two argue that the villains are played as "comic book nasties" and are similar in style to the villains from the Indiana Jones movie franchise.

Shearman further analyzed the portrayals of several of the series' regular characters as 1930s villains, noting several meta-references to the wider series. The author noted that, in his portrayal of a Nazi, Jeffrey Spender was allowed to "cut loose and rant like a proper villain rather than a sulky boy hiding in the basement." In contrast, Walter Skinner's 1939 character behaved more like his character in the wider series, his role "charmingly parodying the ambiguity he's been playing all these years and turning out to be an American-loving ally who tells our heroes to get their 'asses out of here'."

Tom Kessenich, in his book Examinations: An Unauthorized Look at Season 6–9 of The X-Files, critically examined the ideas that the entire episode was either a dream or existed in some sort of "parallel universe". Kessenich reasons that, because the episode contains several overt references to The Wizard of Oz and the fact that Chris Carter noted that the episode was based on the idea of Mulder's subconscious mind at work, much of "Triangle" was simply a dream. Furthermore, Kessenich backs up his argument by pointing out that many of the characters on the ship were played by familiar faces—The Smoking Man as the Nazi leader, Spender as a Nazi "lap dog", Skinner as a double agent, Kersh as an "unfamiliar friend or foe", and Scully as Mulder's ultimate ally. This would suggest, according to Kessenich, that the entire episode was acted out in Mulder's mind while he was unconscious in the Bermuda Triangle.

== Reception ==
=== Ratings ===
"Triangle" premiered on the Fox network in the United States on November 22, 1998. The episode earned a Nielsen rating of 10.8, with a 16 share, meaning that roughly 10.8 percent of all television-equipped households and 16 percent of households watching television were tuned in. It was viewed by 18.2 million viewers. "Triangle" was the 18th most watched television program for the week ending November 22.

=== Initial reception ===
When the finished program was shown to the cast and crew, their response was very positive. Gillian Anderson said, "I never quite understood whether it was going to work or not. When we finally saw 'Triangle' after this new way of filming everything, a style that we'd never attempted before, as well as trying new scenes ... trying this, trying that ... that was terrific." Chris Owens, who portrayed the Agent Spender Nazi lookalike, said, "One thing I really like about The X-Files was that they were always challenging themselves. Chris [Carter] would write an episode in which we're going to do Rope without any cuts, seemingly. A great challenge for a cast and crew."

The episode received generally positive critical reviews from the press. Matt Zoller Seitz from The Star-Ledger gave an overwhelmingly positive review of "Triangle". Applauding Carter's risky and audacious direction, he noted that "there has never been an hour of TV that looks or moves like 'Triangle'". He argued that the 1939 scene where Mulder and "Scully" cross paths with present-Scully was "the greatest minute of TV this year". Seitz also compared the episode to three-dimensional video games, like Doom, Quake, and Castle Wolfenstein, citing the episode's "gloomy corridors" and "nightmarish cartoon Nazis". Michael Liedtke and George Avalos from The Charlotte Observer predicted that "'Triangle' seems destined to take its rightful place in the pantheon of greatest 'X-Files' episodes". Enjoying the plethora of Wizard of Oz references, the two parodied a portion of "Over the Rainbow" in their column. (Note: The parody included the lines: "Somewhere beneath the conspiracy, romantic hopes soar / Mulder and Scully often hug beneath the conspiracy, why, oh why, can't they do more?") Not all reviewers were so positive; for Alan Sepinwall, "Triangle" was the episode "that turned out to be a dream", making it "technically impressive but dramatically murky".

=== Later reception ===
Years after its initial broadcast, "Triangle" has continued to receive positive reviews, with many critics calling it one of the show's best episodes. Earl Cressey from DVD Talk called it one of the highlights of season six. Shearman rated the episode five stars out of five and called it a "shining gem of an episode."

Carter's helmsmanship of "Triangle" received mostly favorable critical attention. Shearman praised his directing, highlighting to the scene where Scully dashes through the FBI building as "the best ... of all". Emily St. James of The A.V. Club, in an "A" grade review, appreciated the style of filming, and wrote that the long scenes give "the whole thing a sense of urgency that propels scenes that shouldn't work". In addition, she called the split-screen shot "darn near perfect"; St. James later labeled it "one of my favorite moments in the whole show". Andrew Payne from Starpulse applauded the acting and directing, saying, "Chris Carter rarely directed his creation, leaving that mostly to Kim Manners, but when he did he showed a brilliant eye not usually seen on broadcast TV. This is the best example—a breathlessly-paced episode in which each act appears as one continuous shot. ... This episode is a lot of fun, particularly in the act that finds Scully blitzing through the FBI building in order to get some information on Mulder's whereabouts. The acting is superb and nothing can beat those no-cut acts." Payne ultimately named it the fourth best X-Files episode. David Boston from Made Man wrote that "we know whenever [Chris Carter] directs an episode it is always among the best." Timothy Sexton from Yahoo! Voices praised the split-screen scene and the scene featuring Scully running through the FBI building, comparing it favorably to Orson Welles' 1958 film Touch of Evil. Jonathan Dunn, writing for What Culture, described "Triangle" as "great" and included it in the "5 episodes [of The X-Files] That Could Be Made Into Movies" list. In the 1999 FX Thanksgiving Marathon, containing fan-selected episodes, "Triangle" was presented as the "Best Chris Carter-Directed Episode". Not all reviews were as glowing; Paula Vitaris from Cinefantastique wrote that "everyone certainly deserves an A for effort", she was unimpressed by the "vertiginous camerawork" and "endless, monotonous tracking shots up and down hallways". She ultimately awarded it one-and-a-half stars out of four.

In addition, many reviewers were pleased with the style and concept of "Triangle". Tom Kessenich lauded the atmosphere of the entry, calling it "60 minutes of The X-Files at its finest". Kessenich noted that, despite the "gloom and doom" talk that the series was heading in the wrong direction, stylistically, the episode proved "just how exciting this show can be". He ultimately concluded that it was "a wonderful blend of fantasy and reality" that allowed the viewer "to try and ascertain what is real and what is not." He later named "Triangle" one of the "Top 25 Episode of All Time" of The X-Files, and ranked it in second place. St. James noted that she thoroughly enjoyed the concept, pointing out that the "sheer level of crazy stuff that goes on in this episode makes it fun to watch". She wrote that "[n]othing else had ever been this skillfully done on television before", which resulted in a "terrific episode of television". Furthermore, she opined that "[e]verything comes together in the episode's fantastically entertaining final act", due to the presence of the dramatic fight scene, among others.

"Triangle" features the first kiss between Mulder and Scully. Kessenich opined that the kiss built off "the seeds that were planted in the movie ... Scully clearly believes this is a man lost in delirium, but Mulder ... is finally beginning to deal with some pretty powerful feelings he has for his partner." Paula Vitaris, on the other hand, was frustrated; she complained "[w]hen are these kisses that are not kisses going to end?"

=== Awards ===
The episode received a 1999 Emmy Award nomination for Outstanding Sound Editing for a Series. (Note: Jeff Charbonneau (Music Editor); Thierry J. Couturier (Supervising Sound Editor); Stuart Calderon, Michael Goodman, Jay Levine, Maciek Malish M.P.S.E., George Nemzer, Cecilia Perna, Chris Reeves, and Gabrielle Reeves (Sound Editors); and Gary Marullo and Mike Salvetta (Foley Artists) were nominated for the award.)
