= David Klotz =

American composer and music editor

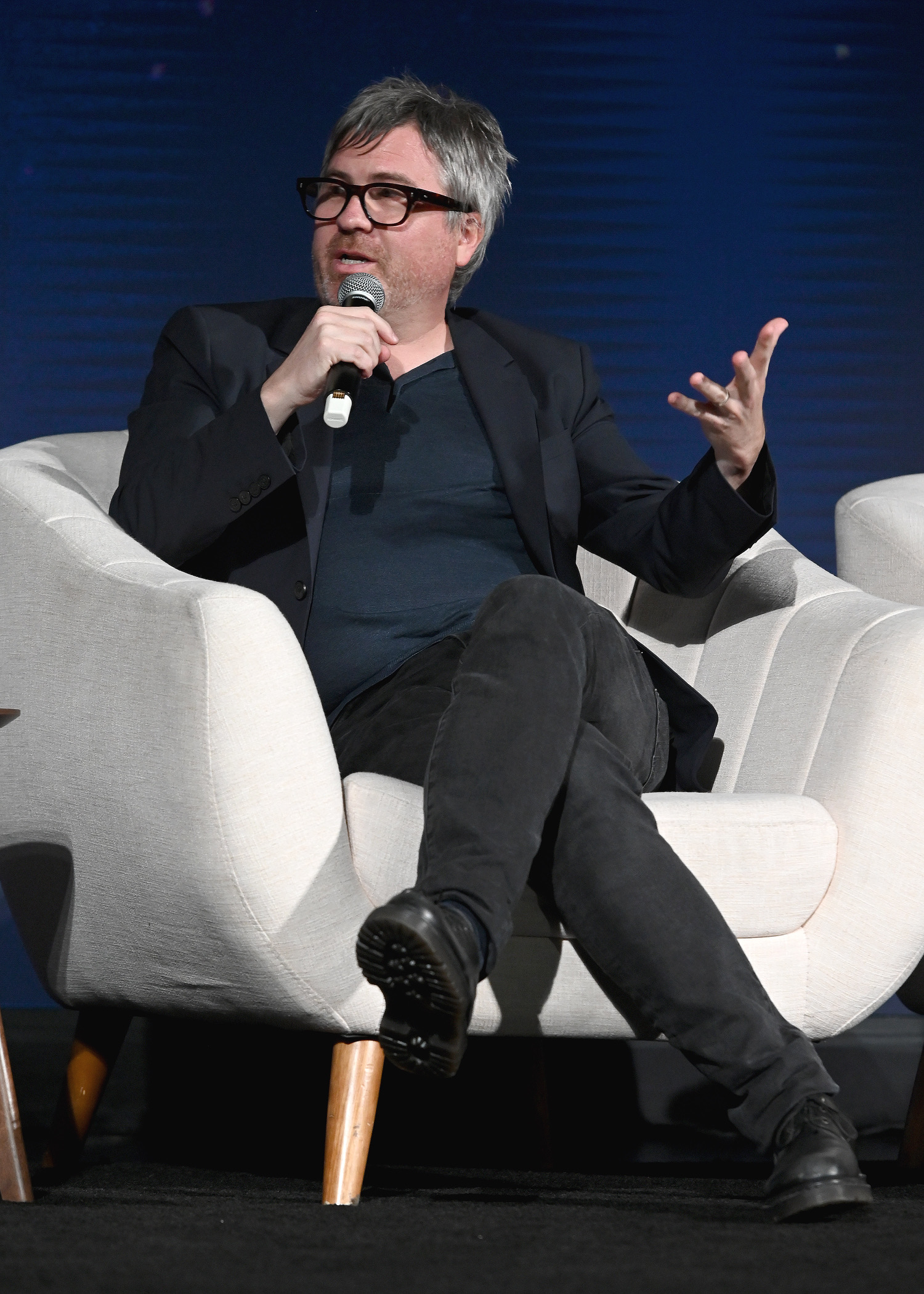

Background information
- Born: Pittsburgh, Pennsylvania, U.S.
- Genres: Film score, Synth-Pop, Indie pop
- Occupations: Composer, music editor
- Instruments: Guitar, keyboards
- Years active: 1995–present

David Klotz is an American composer and music editor. He won eight Primetime Emmy Awards for his music editorial work on Stranger Things, Game of Thrones and American Horror Story.

== Career ==
David graduated from Emerson College in 1994. He formed a band Fonda, along with Aaron Ryder and Emily Cook. In 2001, he wrote and performed the title song to Robert Rodriguez's film Spy Kids. In 2016, he formed a synth-based band DREAM SYSTEM 8, along with singer Erica Elektra.

David recorded and arranged a cover version of Limahl's 1984 hit "The NeverEnding Story" for the season three finale of Stranger Things in 2019 while working as the show's music editor.

David has also composed music for television and film. His composing credits include the 2020 Netflix film The Prom (co-composed with Matthew Sklar), the series American Horror Stories (2021–2024), The Watcher (2022, co-composed with Morgan Kibby), American Sports Story (2024) and the Hulu series All's Fair (2025, co-composed with Morgan Kibby).

== Selected filmography ==
As Composer

- 2025 – All's Fair
- 2024 – American Sports Story
- 2021-2024 – American Horror Stories
- 2022 – The Watcher
- 2020 – The Prom
- 2001 – Close to Home

As Music editor

- 2016-2025 – Stranger Things
- 2025 – The Abandons
- 2025 – Death by Lightning
- 2022 – House of the Dragon
- 2021 – The Retaliators
- 2021 – Halston
- 2016-2021 – American Crime Story
- 2018-2021 – Pose
- 2020 – Ratched
- 2020 – Perry Mason
- 2020 – Hollywood
- 2020 – I Am Not Okay with This
- 2019-2020 – The Politician
- 2011-2019 – American Horror Story
- 2011-2019 – Game of Thrones
- 2019 – Valley of the Boom
- 2018 – 9-1-1
- 2017 – Dirty Dancing
- 2017 – Feud
- 2016 – Dead of Summer
- 2015-2016 – Scream Queens
- 2009-2012 – Glee
- 2011 – Breakout Kings
- 2005-2008 – Prison Break
- 2008 – Deception
- 2008 – Iron Man
- 2006 – Blade: The Series

== Awards and nominations ==
Year	Result	Award	Category	Work	Ref.
2024	Nominated	Primetime Emmy Awards	Outstanding Sound Editing for a Comedy or Drama Series (One-Hour)	3 Body Problem: Judgment Day	
2023	Nominated	Primetime Emmy Awards	Outstanding Sound Editing for a Comedy or Drama Series (One-Hour)	Stranger Things: Chapter Nine: The Piggyback	
2023	Nominated	Primetime Emmy Awards	Outstanding Sound Editing for a Limited or Anthology Series, Movie or Special	Dahmer - Monster: The Jeffrey Dahmer Story: God Of Forgiveness, God Of Vengeance	
2022	Won	Primetime Emmy Awards	Outstanding Sound Editing for a Comedy or Drama Series (One-Hour)	Stranger Things: Chapter Seven: The Massacre at Hawkins Lab	
2022	Won	Motion Picture Sound Editors	Outstanding Achievement in Sound Editing – Music Score and Musical for Episodic Long Form Broadcast Media	Stranger Things: Chapter Nine: The Piggyback	
2020	Nominated	Primetime Emmy Awards	Outstanding Sound Editing for a Limited Series, Movie or Special	American Horror Story: Camp Redwood	
2020	Won	Motion Picture Sound Editors	Outstanding Achievement in Sound Editing - Music Score and Musical for Episodic Long Form Broadcast Media	Game of Thrones	
2019	Won	Motion Picture Sound Editors	Outstanding Achievement in Sound Editing - Music Score and Musical for Episodic Short Form Broadcast Media	American Horror Story: The End	
2019	Won	Primetime Emmy Awards	Outstanding Sound Editing for a Comedy or Drama Series (One-Hour)	Game of Thrones	
2018	Won	Primetime Emmy Awards	Outstanding Sound Editing for a Comedy or Drama Series (One-Hour)	Stranger Things	
2018	Won	Motion Picture Sound Editors	Outstanding Achievement in Sound Editing - Music Score and Musical for Episodic Short Form Broadcast Media	Stranger Things	
2017	Won	Motion Picture Sound Editors	Best Sound Editing - Short Form Music in Television	Stranger Things	
2017	Won	Primetime Emmy Awards	Outstanding Sound Editing for a Series	Stranger Things	
2015	Won	Primetime Emmy Awards	Outstanding Sound Editing for a Series	Game of Thrones	
2014	Won	Motion Picture Sound Editors	Outstanding Sound Editing for a Series	Game of Thrones	
2013	Won	Primetime Emmy Awards	Outstanding Sound Editing for a Miniseries, Movie or a Special	American Horror Story	
2012	Won	Primetime Emmy Awards	Outstanding Sound Editing for a Series	Game of Thrones	
2011	Won	Motion Picture Sound Editors	Best Sound Editing - Short Form Musical in Television	Glee	
2010	Won	Motion Picture Sound Editors	Best Sound Editing - Short Form Music in Television	Glee	
