= Wayne Artman =

American sound engineer

- Born: November 24, 1936; United States
- Died: November 9, 2006 (aged 69); Beverly Hills, California, United States
- Occupation: Sound engineer
- Years active: 1973 – 2000

Wayne Artman (November 24, 1936 – November 9, 2006) was an American sound engineer. He was nominated for an Academy Award in the category Best Sound for the film The Witches of Eastwick. He worked on over 130 films between 1973 and 2000.

== Selected filmography ==
- The Witches of Eastwick (1987)
