= The Witches of Eastwick (film) =

1987 film by George Miller

- Theatrical release poster
- Directed by: George Miller
- Screenplay by: Michael Cristofer
- Based on: The Witches of Eastwick by John Updike
- Produced by: Neil Canton; Peter Guber; Jon Peters
- Starring: Jack Nicholson; Cher; Susan Sarandon; Michelle Pfeiffer; Veronica Cartwright
- Cinematography: Vilmos Zsigmond
- Edited by: Richard Francis-Bruce; Hubert C. de la Bouillerie
- Music by: John Williams
- Production companies: Guber-Peters Company; Kennedy Miller
- Distributed by: Warner Bros.
- Release date: June 12, 1987
- Running time: 118 minutes
- Country: United States
- Language: English
- Budget: $22 million
- Box office: $103 million

The Witches of Eastwick is a 1987 American dark fantasy comedy film directed by George Miller from a screenplay by Michael Cristofer, based on the 1984 novel by John Updike. It stars Jack Nicholson alongside Cher, Susan Sarandon, Michelle Pfeiffer, and Veronica Cartwright.

The film follows three best friends who are unaware that they are witches and that their regular meetings have formed an informal coven; the arrival in town of a mysterious man who starts courting them marks the start of a back-and-forth between him and the three women.

The film was a box office success and received mixed-to-positive reviews from critics, who praised the performances, especially from Nicholson, but criticized the story.

== Plot ==
Alexandra Medford, Jane Spofford, and Sukie Ridgemont are three dissatisfied women living in picturesque Eastwick, Rhode Island. Sculptor Alex is a single mother of one, newly divorced music teacher Jane cannot have children, and Sukie has six and is a columnist for the newspaper Eastwick Word. The friends all have lost their husbands (Alex's died, Jane's divorced her, and Sukie's deserted her). Unaware of being witches, they unwittingly form a coven, meeting weekly to discuss ideal men.

A mysterious man buys the town's landmark property, the Lenox Mansion. His arrival fascinates the townspeople except Felicia Alden, the religious wife of newspaper editor Clyde Alden, Sukie's boss. She senses he (whose name is easily forgotten) is ill-intentioned.

One night, he appears at Jane's recital and makes a spectacle, leading to more gossip. Receiving flowers from D sparks Sukie to remember his name is Daryl Van Horne. Chaos over the name spreads through the crowd. Sukie's pearl necklace breaks, the beads falling all over the floor, causing Felicia (who had mocked his name) to fall down stairs, breaking her leg.

The next day, Daryl seduces Alex. He says rude things whenever he speaks. Appalled, she refuses his advances and begins to walk out. Before she opens the door, he manipulates her emotions until she eventually agrees. The next morning, Daryl visits the insecure Jane. They sit and politely converse, as she explains the Lenox Mansion was built on a site where witches were executed. Later that night, Daryl encourages Jane to play her cello with wild abandon, playing increasingly fast while accompanied by him on piano, until the strings emit smoke, the cello catches fire, and Jane passionately flings herself upon him.

The following week, Daryl invites all three over, now seeking Sukie. Envy and rivalry emerge among them and they inadvertently levitate a tennis ball. Now aware of their magical abilities, the women agree to share Daryl. As the women spend more time at Daryl's mansion, Felicia spreads rumors about their indecency, turning the trio into social outcasts. As the witches begin to question their loyalty to Daryl, he causes them to unknowingly cast a spell against Felicia. Later that night, while ranting to her husband about Daryl being the Devil, she begins to vomit cherry pits. Horrified by her uncontrollable behavior, Clyde kills her with a fire poker.

After Felicia's death, the trio, fearing their powers, agree to avoid each other and Daryl until the situation stabilizes. Upset at being abandoned, he awakens their worst fears. Alex thinks she is covered with snakes; Jane rapidly ages; and Sukie has agonizing pain. Realizing they can only remove Daryl through witchcraft, they reunite with him, pretending to make amends. They all also discover they are pregnant.

The next morning, the trio send Daryl on an errand while Alex uses wax and his hair to create a voodoo doll of him that they harm, hoping he will leave. As the spell takes effect, Daryl – still in town – is hit by a wind and begins to feel excruciating pain (each event corresponding to something the women do to the doll). He hides inside a church from the wind and finds it full of worshippers. Realizing the source of his troubles, he rants about the women, cursing them as a group before vomiting cherry pits as Felicia did. Enraged, Daryl races home to punish the witches for their betrayal. Unsure if the voodoo has affected him, they attempt to behave normally, only to be shocked when he enters the mansion disheveled, incoherent, and seeking revenge.

In the ensuing chaos, the doll breaks into pieces. This causes Daryl to transform into a giant monster that attempts to shake the mansion apart and starts a fire. The witches then toss the broken doll into the fire, causing Daryl to change into a shriveled homunculus and vanish.

Eighteen months later, the women are living together in Daryl's mansion, each with a new baby son. The boys are playing together when Daryl appears on a wall filled with video screens, inviting them to "give Daddy a kiss". Before they can, the ladies appear and switch off the televisions, to his chagrin.

== Cast ==
- Jack Nicholson as Daryl Van Horne
- Cher as Alexandra Medford
- Susan Sarandon as Jane Spofford
- Michelle Pfeiffer as Sukie Ridgemont
- Veronica Cartwright as Felicia Alden
- Richard Jenkins as Clyde Alden
- Keith Jochim as Walter Neff
- Carel Struycken as Fidel
- Becca Lish as Mrs. Neff

== Production ==
=== Casting ===
Jack Nicholson expressed interest in playing the role of Daryl through his then-girlfriend Anjelica Huston, after hearing that the original actor for the role, Bill Murray, had dropped out. Huston was in the running for the role of Alexandra Medford, and screen-tested opposite Michelle Pfeiffer, who had already been cast as Sukie, and Amy Madigan, who was being considered for the role of Jane. After giving a self-confessed "terrible" audition in which she struggled with the "tough" dialogue, Huston realized she had lost the role, and it would be eventually acquired by Cher; but Cher insisted on playing the part of Alexandra, which had already been given to Susan Sarandon. Producers gave in to Cher's demands and cast her in the role instead, without ever giving Sarandon proper notice of the revision. She did not find out that her role had been given to Cher, and that she herself had been re-cast as Jane, until the day she turned up on location to start filming. Cher later said that prior to working on the film, director George Miller called her at home, the day after her 40th birthday, to inform her that he and Nicholson didn't want her in the film. She was deemed "too old and not sexy".

=== Filming ===
The Witches of Eastwick was originally set to be shot in Little Compton, Rhode Island, but controversy erupted in Little Compton over whether or not its Congregational church should be involved with the film's production. Warner Bros. Pictures instead turned to locations in Massachusetts. Principal photography began on July 14, 1986, and took place over the course of six weeks in Cohasset and nearby Massachusetts towns, such as Marblehead and Scituate. Castle Hill in Ipswich, Massachusetts, was used for the exterior of the Lenox Mansion, while the lobby of the Wang Theatre in Boston stood in for the main hall. Other interiors were filmed at the Greystone Mansion in Beverly Hills, though the swimming pool and Daryl's library were sets built on the Warner Bros. backlot.

In an interview, the director Miller said "I quit the film twice and Jack [Nicholson] held me in there," said Miller. "He said, 'Just sit down, lose your emotion, and have a look at the work. If you think the work is good, stick with the film.' And he was a great man. I learnt more from him than anybody else I've worked with - he was extraordinary." Nicholson also coached Miller to exaggerate his needs during the production, asking for 300 extras when he only needed 150, knowing that his producers would give him less than he requested.

Prior to filming, a small carving shop led by woodcarver Paul McCarthy was commissioned to hand-carve all the wooden signs for the businesses shown in the film, including the newspaper where Michelle Pfeiffer's character worked – The Eastwick Word.

An award-winning documentary film called When the Witches Came to Town goes behind the scenes of the making of The Witches of Eastwick in Cohasset, Massachusetts, during the summer of 1986.

=== Music ===
The musical score for The Witches of Eastwick was composed and conducted by John Williams. A soundtrack album was released by Warner Bros. Records in 1987.

== Reception ==
=== Box office ===
The film grossed $63.8 million in the United States and Canada. By November 30, 1987, it had grossed $39.4 million internationally, for a worldwide total of over $103 million.

=== Critical response ===
The film received mixed reviews upon release. On the review aggregator website Rotten Tomatoes, the film holds an approval rating of 67% based on 95 reviews, with an average rating of 6.5/10. The website's critics consensus reads, "While devotees of John Updike's novel may want to put a hex on George Miller's cartoonish and effects-laden adaptation, Jack Nicholson lends enough decadent devilry to make this high-concept comedy sizzle." Metacritic, which uses a weighted average, assigned the film a score of 67 out of 100, based on 11 critics, indicating "generally favorable" reviews. Audiences polled by CinemaScore gave the film an average grade of "B+" on an A+ to F scale.

The Washington Post wrote that "Hollywood pulls out all the stops here, including a reordering of John Updike's original book to give you one flashy and chock-full-o'-surprises witches' tale." Janet Maslin in The New York Times commended the "bright, flashy, exclamatory style." Variety described it as a "very funny and irresistible set-up."

Some critics thought that the last part of the film spiraled into ridiculousness. The Washington Post wrote that the second half "lost its magic and degenerated into bunk." According to The New York Times, "beneath the surface charm there is too much confusion, and the charm itself is gone long before the film is over." Time Out wrote that "the last 20 minutes dive straight to the bottom of the proverbial barrel with a final crass orgy of special effects." Roger Ebert in the Chicago Sun-Times gave the film three-and-a-half stars out of four, acknowledging that "the movie's climax is overdone" yet added that "a lot of the time this movie plays like a plausible story about implausible people."

The majority of critics saw the film as a showcase for Nicholson's comic talents. The Chicago Sun-Times thought it "a role he was born to fill... There is a scene where he dresses in satin pajamas and sprawls full length on a bed, twisting and stretching sinuously in full enjoyment of his sensuality. It is one of the funniest moments of physical humor he has ever committed." The New York Times wrote that although "the performers are eminently watchable... none of them seem a match for Mr. Nicholson's self-proclaimed 'horny little devil'." Variety called it a "no-holds-barred performance," and wrote that the "spectacle of the film is really Nicholson." The Washington Post wrote that Nicholson was "undisputably the star of The Witches of Eastwick, despite formidable competition from his coven played by Cher, Michelle Pfeiffer, and Susan Sarandon," although even more praise was reserved for Veronica Cartwright in an eccentric, scene-stealing supporting role.

Ruth Crawford wrote: "This film includes many fantasy elements. By far the most fantastic of them is the depiction of a single mother of five, who has to work for a living and still has plenty of time and energy left to engage in wild adventures of sex and magic. If being a witch gives you the ability to do that, quite a few women I know would be very happy to sign up at the nearest coven."

=== Accolades ===
Award	Category	Recipient(s)	Result	Ref.
Academy Awards	Best Original Score	John Williams	Nominated	
Academy Awards	Best Sound	Wayne Artman, Tom Beckert, Tom E. Dahl, and Art Rochester	Nominated	
BMI Film & TV Awards	BMI Film Music Award	John Williams	Won	
British Academy Film Awards	Best Special Visual Effects	Michael Lantieri, Michael Owens, Ed Jones, and Bruce Walters	Won	
Grammy Awards	Best Album of Original Instrumental Background Score; Written for a Motion Picture or Television	John Williams	Nominated	
Hugo Awards	Best Dramatic Presentation	The Witches of Eastwick	Nominated	
Los Angeles Film Critics Association Awards	Best Actor	Jack Nicholson (Note: Also for Ironweed)	Won (Note: Tied with Steve Martin for Roxanne)	
New York Film Critics Circle Awards	Best Actor	Jack Nicholson (Note: Also for Ironweed and Broadcast News)	Won	
Saturn Awards	Best Fantasy Film	The Witches of Eastwick	Nominated	
Saturn Awards	Best Actor	Jack Nicholson	Won	
Saturn Awards	Best Actress	Susan Sarandon	Nominated	
Saturn Awards	Best Supporting Actress	Veronica Cartwright	Nominated	
Saturn Awards	Best Writing	Michael Cristofer	Nominated	
Saturn Awards	Best Music	John Williams	Nominated	
Saturn Awards	Best Special Effects	Michael Lantieri	Nominated	

== See also ==
- List of films about witchcraft
