= Doug Grindstaff =

American sound editor

- Born: Douglas Howard Grindstaff; April 6, 1931; Los Angeles, California, U.S.
- Died: July 23, 2018 (aged 87); Peoria, Arizona, U.S.
- Occupation: Sound editor
- Spouse: Marsha Grindstaff
- Children: 3

Douglas Howard Grindstaff (April 6, 1931 – July 23, 2018) was an American sound editor. He won five Primetime Emmy Awards and was nominated for nine more in the category Outstanding Sound Editing for his work on the television programs Star Trek: The Original Series, The Immortal, Mannix, Mission: Impossible, Medical Story, The Quest, The Fantastic Journey, Police Story, Fantasy Island and Max Headroom, and also the television films The Last Hurrah, To Kill a Cop, A Fire in the Sky and Power. Grindstaff died in July 2018 in Peoria, Arizona, at the age of 87.
