= Paula Fairfield =

Canadian sound artist

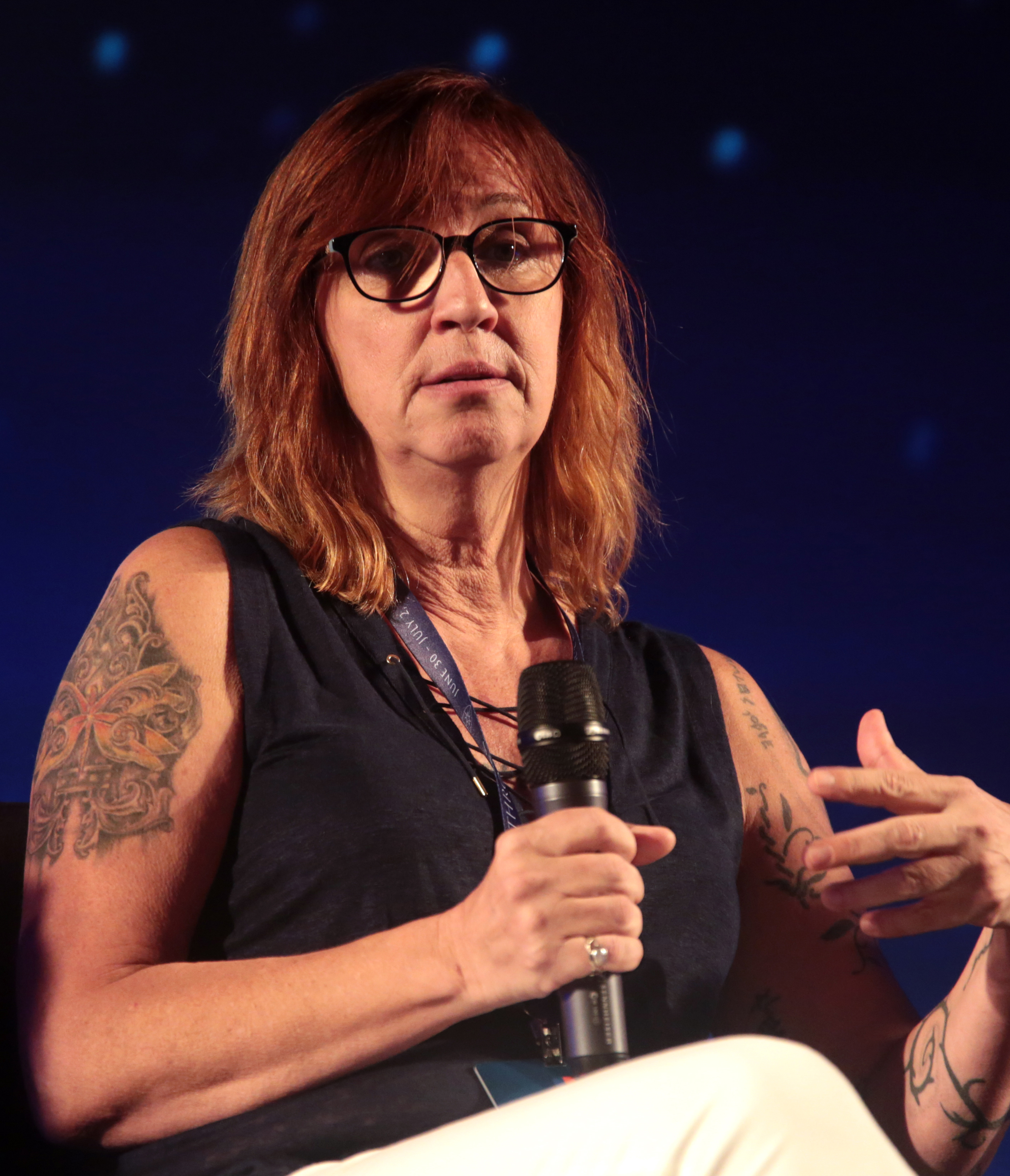
- Fairfield in 2017
- Born: Halifax, Nova Scotia, Canada
- Occupation: Sound Designer

Paula Fairfield is a Canadian American sound designer and sound artist, based in Southern California. She is best known for her work on the series Game of Thrones. She has a BAFTA Award for House of the Dragon (won 2023); and a total of fifteen Emmy nominations: one for Agatha All Along, one for Rings of Power, one for House of the Dragon, one for 3 Body Problem, six for Game of Thrones (won in 2015 and 2019), three for Lost, one for The River, and one for the series Lovecraft Country (won 2021). In May 2021, she was awarded an honorary Doctorate of Fine Arts from her alma mater, NSCAD University. She also has 5 golden reel awards and 20 nominations for her work from the Motion Picture Sound Editors guild.

== Life in Canada ==
Fairfield was born in Halifax, Nova Scotia, in 1961 and grew up in a nearby town called Bridgewater. She attended college at the Nova Scotia College of Art and Design University (NSCAD) in the early 1980s studying art history and photography. After graduating with a BFA, she moved to Montreal for two years where she worked as an artist and did a training program at the National Film Board of Canada (NFB)'s Studio D. Fairfield then moved to Toronto where she co-managed Charles Street Video, a non-profit centre run by artists. Her video and film art was exhibited all over the world and resides in several collections including the National Gallery of Canada.

Fairfield worked at SoundDogs, the Toronto-based post production sound company. She said, "I just wandered in one day and they had just lost their effects guy and they took a chance on me. I had a lot to learn, but I loved it." This is where she learned how to edit sound and sound design for television and film.

== Life in the United States ==
Fairfield moved to Los Angeles in 1998.

She established her company, Eargasm, Inc, in 2014. She has a studio in her home — a sealed garage with highly insulated walls. The studio is set up for Dolby Atmos and uses PMC monitors and an Avid Pro Tools S6 console. She left Los Angeles for the Coachella Valley after a divorce from her wife and losing her brother, sister and father to cancer. According to The Desert Sun, "the desert’s spirituality and solitude keep her centered as an artist. After an intense day of sound editing, she simply steps out of her studio and into her home space, a quiet desert sanctuary she describes as 'Bliss.'"

== Awards and nominations ==
- BAFTA Winner for Best Sound: Fiction, House of the Dragon, 2023
- Emmy Winner for Outstanding Sound Editing for a Comedy or Drama Series (One Hour), Lovecraft Country: Sundown, 2020
- Emmy Winner for Outstanding Sound Editing for a Comedy or Drama Series (One Hour), Game of Thrones: The Long Night, 2019
- Emmy Nominated for Outstanding Sound Editing for a Comedy or Drama Series (One Hour) - Game of Thrones: The Spoils of War, 2018
- Emmy Nominated for Outstanding Sound Editing for a Series, Game of Thrones: Nominated 2013, 2014, 2016, Lost: Nominated 2007, 2008, 2010
- Emmy Winner for Outstanding Sound Editing for a Series, Game of Thrones: Hardhome, 2015
- Emmy Nominated Outstanding Sound Editing for a Miniseries, Movie or a Special, The River: Doctor Emmet Cole, 2012
- Winner Gemini Award for Best Sound in a Dramatic Program or Series, 1996
- Nominee of Gemini Award for Best Sound Editing, 1996 and 1999
- 5 MPSE Golden Reel wins and 14 MPSE Golden Reel Nominations
- In 1996, she was recognized in "Who's Who in Canadian Film and Television"
