= Micha Liberman =

American music editor and composer

- Born: U.S.
- Genres: Film score Television score
- Occupations: Music editor, Composer
- Years active: 1997–present

Micha Liberman is an American music editor and composer known for his work in television and film. He has contributed to projects such as Deadwood, Only Murders in the Building, and Avatar: The Last Airbender, with credits spanning both music editing and composition.

== Selected filmography ==
As Music editor

- 2024 – No Good Deed
- 2024 – Avatar: The Last Airbender
- 2021-2024 – Only Murders in the Building
- 2023 – Virgin River
- 2023 – Leguizamo Does America
- 2023 – Your Place or Mine
- 2021-2022 – Love, Victor
- 2022 – Pivoting
- 2020 – Die Hart
- 2019 – Nancy Drew
- 2019 – Bluff City Law
- 2019 – Looking for Alaska
- 2019 – Deadwood: The Movie
- 2017-2018 – 9JKL
- 2017 – Runaways
- 2017 – Me, Myself & I
- 2015-2017 – Rosewood
- 2013-2016 – Rectify
- 2016 – Angel from Hell
- 2013-2014 – Trophy Wife
- 2013-2014 – Twisted
- 2013 – Welcome to the Family
- 2011 – Terra Nova
- 2010-2011 – Lie to Me
- 2007-2010 – Cold Case
- 2008 – Never Back Down
- 2004-2006 – Deadwood

As Composer

- 2001 – Zigs
- 2001 – Free

== Awards and nominations ==
=== Primetime Emmy Awards ===
Year	Category	Nominated work	Result	Ref.
2024	Outstanding Sound Editing for a Comedy or Drama Series (One-Hour)	Avatar: The Last Airbender : "Legends"	Nominated	
2024	Outstanding Sound Editing for a Comedy or Drama Series (Half-Hour) and Animation	Only Murders in the Building : "Sitzprobe"	Nominated	
2019	Outstanding Sound Editing for a Limited or Anthology Series, Movie or Special	Deadwood: The Movie	Nominated	
2004	Outstanding Sound Editing for a Comedy or Drama Series (One-Hour)	Deadwood	Won	

=== Motion Picture Sound Editors ===
Year	Category	Nominated work	Result	Ref.
2024	Outstanding Achievement in Music Editing – Broadcast Short Form	Only Murders in the Building: "My Best Friend's Wedding"	Won	
2023	Outstanding Achievement in Music Editing – Broadcast Short Form	Only Murders in the Building: "Opening Night"	Nominated	
2021	Outstanding Achievement in Sound Editing – 1/2 Hour – Comedy or Drama	Only Murders in the Building: "The Boy From 6B"	Won	
2019	Outstanding Achievement in Sound Editing – Non-Theatrical Feature	Deadwood: The Movie	Nominated	
2011	Best Sound Editing - Long Form Music in Television	Terra Nova: "Occupation/Resistance"	Nominated	

=== Hollywood Professional Association Awards ===
Year	Category	Nominated work	Result	Ref.
2019	Outstanding Sound - Episodic or Non-Theatrical Feature	Deadwood: The Movie	Nominated	
