= Tom E. Dahl =

American sound engineer

- Occupation: Sound engineer
- Years active: 1977 – present

Tom E. Dahl is an American sound engineer. He was nominated for an Academy Award in the category Best Sound for the film The Witches of Eastwick. He has worked on more than 160 films since 1977.

== Selected filmography ==
- The Witches of Eastwick (1987)
