= Edward L. Sandlin =

American sound editor

- Born: July 16, 1922; Texas, U.S.
- Died: November 13, 1992 (aged 70); Woodland Hills, California, U.S.
- Occupation: Sound editor
- Spouse: Mari Carmen
- Children: 2

Edward L. Sandlin (July 16, 1922 – November 13, 1992) was an American sound editor. He won two Primetime Emmy Awards and was nominated for six more in the category Outstanding Sound Editing for his work on the television programs Mannix, Police Story, QB VII, The Dark Secret of Harvest Home, Knight Rider, The Winds of War and Wiseguy, and also the television film Raid on Entebbe. Sandlin died in November 1992 of cancer in Woodland Hills, California, at the age of 70. He was buried in Pierce Brothers Valley Oaks Memorial Park.
