= Angelo Palazzo =

American sound editor

- Occupation: Sound editor
- Years active: 1994–present

Angelo Palazzo is an American sound editor. He won three Primetime Emmy Awards and was nominated for three more in the category Outstanding Sound Editing for his work on the television programs Star Trek: Discovery and Stranger Things.
