= Don Isaacs =

American sound editor

- Born: July 23, 1919
- Died: February 6, 1998 (aged 78); Beverly Hills, California, U.S.
- Occupation: Sound editor

Don Isaacs (July 23, 1919 – February 6, 1998) was an American sound editor. He won two Primetime Emmy Awards and was nominated for seven more in the category Outstanding Sound Editing.

== Filmography ==
- A Hatful of Rain (1957)
- The Three Faces of Eve (1957)
- No Down Payment (1957)
- Peyton Place (1957)
- The Bravados (1958)
- The Fly (1958)
- The Roots of Heaven (1958)
- Here Come the Jets (1959)
- Shoot Out at Big Sag (1962)
- Emperor of the North (1973)
- The Legend of Lizzie Borden (1975)
- Six Pack (1982)
- Kiss Me Goodbye (1982)
- The Buddy System (1984)
- Unfaithfully Yours (1984)
- Iron Eagle (1986)
- Summer Camp Nightmare (1986)
- Native Son (1986)
- Retribution (1987)
- Waxwork (1988)
- Mac and Me (1988)
- Blueberry Hill (1988)
