= Gregg Barbanell =

American sound editor

- Occupation: Sound editor
- Years active: 1976–present

Gregg Barbanell is an American sound editor. He won a Primetime Emmy Award and was nominated for twelve more in the category Outstanding Sound Editing.
