= Mace Matiosian =

American sound editor

- Occupation: Sound editor
- Years active: 1983–present

Mace Matiosian is an American sound editor. He has won five Primetime Emmy Awards and has been nominated for eleven more in the category Outstanding Sound Editing.
