= Maciek Malish =

Maciek Malish (born Maciej Juliusz Malisz; January 7, 1962 – September 12, 2015) was a Polish-born American sound editor. He received ten Emmy Awards nomination during his career for his work on The X-Files, Millennium, Lost, and The Tick. Malish won two Primetime Emmy Awards in 1996 and 1997 for his sound editing work on The X-Files. Malish also garnered nine Motion Picture Sound Editors Award nominations, winning twice for his work on Lost and the 2000 television film Noriega: God's Favorite.

Malish was a native of Gliwice, Poland. In addition to The X-Files, Malish's sound editing credits in television included The Wonder Years, L.A. Law, Ally McBeal, Lost, Person of Interest, as well as the upcoming HBO series, Westworld, which is scheduled to premiere in 2016. His film credits included The Hand That Rocks the Cradle in 1992, Starship Troopers in 1997, and Jobs in 2013.

Malish was killed in a traffic accident on September 12, 2015, while bicycling in Moorpark, California. Malish's bicycle was struck by a car while he was biking on Moorpark Road. The same car also struck a passing motorcycle, killing its driver, 43-year old Jesse Cushman. The California Highway Patrol, which was investigating the accident, noted that drugs and alcohol did not appear to have played a role in the accident.

Maciek Malish, a resident of Simi Valley, California, was 53-years old. His funeral and burial were held in Poland.
