= Golden Reel Award for Outstanding Achievement in Sound Editing – Sound Effects, Foley, Music, Dialogue and ADR for Live Action Broadcast Media Under 35 Minutes =

- Country: United States
- Presented by: Motion Picture Sound Editors
- Currently held by: Mathew Waters, Danika Wikke, Meredith Stacy, Micha Liberman – Only Murders in the Building (2021)

The Golden Reel Award for Outstanding Achievement in Sound Editing – Sound Effects, Foley, Music, Dialogue and ADR for Live Action Broadcast Media Under 35 Minutes is an annual award given by the Motion Picture Sound Editors. It honors sound editors whose work has warranted merit in the field of television; in this case, their work on episodes with run times 35 or less. The "short form" of the title refers to television episodes that have a runtime of less than one hour, though more than 35 minutes, as those episodes now have their own category. The award has been given with its current title since 2019. Previously, series eligible for this award could be nominated for the short form dialogue & ADR and sound effects & Foley categories.

== Winners and nominees ==
=== 2010s ===
Year	Program	Episode(s)	Nominees	Network
2018	Star Trek: Short Treks	"The Brightest Star"	Matthew E. Taylor (supervising sound editor); Tim Farrell (sound designer); Michael Schapiro (sound effects editor); John Sanacore (Foley editor); Sean Heissinger (dialogue editor); Matt Decker (music editor); Christopher Moriana, Nancy Parker (Foley artists)	CBS All Access
2018	Ballers	"This Is Not Our World"	Mark Relyea (supervising sound editor); David Barbee (sound designer); Julie Altus (supervising ADR editor); Russell Topal (sound effects editor); Chris Kahwaty (dialogue editor); Bruno Roussel (music editor); Joseph T. Sabella, Jesi Ruppel, Damien Smith (Foley artists)	HBO
2018	Barry	"Chapter Seven: Loud, Fast, and Keep Going"	Matthew E. Taylor (supervising sound editor); Rickley W. Dumm (sound designer); Sean Heissinger (supervising dialogue editor); Candice Brunello (sound effects editor); John Sanacore, Clayton Weber (Foley editors); Michael Brake (music editor); Hilda Hodges, Rick Owens (Foley artists)	HBO
2018	Everything Sucks!	"We Were Merely Freshman"	Christopher Gomez (supervising sound editor, sound designer), Kent Militzer (sound designer/effects editor), Mason Kopeikin (dialogue editor), Jennifer Barak (music editor), Habib Tannous (Foley artist)	Netflix
2018	One Day at a Time	"Homecoming"	Tim Terusa (supervising sound editor, sound effects/dialogue editor), Kevin Meltcher (assistant sound editor)	Netflix
2018	The Good Place	"Janet(s)"	Brent Findley (supervising sound editor); Kevin McCullough (sound effects editor); Terry Boyd Jr. (Foley editor); G.W. Brown (dialogue editor); Bryant J. Fuhrmann, Jason Tregoe Newman (music editors); Elizabeth Rainey, Jody Thomas (Foley artists)	NBC
2018	Kidding	"The Cookie"	Susan Cahill (supervising sound editor); Jonathan Golodner (sound effects editor); Randall Guth, Derek McGinley (Foley editors); Jane Boegel (dialogue editor); Sara Bencivenga (ADR editor); Michael Brake, Jason Tregoe Newman (music editors); Dominique Decaudain, Pamela Kahn (Foley artists)	Showtime
2018	Sweetbitter	"Now Your Tongue Is Coded"	Glenfield Payne (supervising sound editor); Damian Volpe (sound effects editor); Heather Gross, Matthew Haasch (Foley editors); Ian Cymore (dialogue editor); Ruth Hernandez (ADR editor); Chad Birmingham (music editor); Jay Peck (Foley artist)	Starz
2018	Young Sheldon	"An 8-Bit Princess and a Flat Tire Genius"	Michael Ferdie (supervising sound editor); Adam Parrish King (sound effects editor); Arno Stephanian, Lucy Wolf (Foley editors); Lee Dragu (dialogue editor); Joe Deveau (music editor); Sanaa Kelley, Matt Salib (Foley artists)	CBS
2019	Barry	"ronny/lily"	Sean Heissinger, Matthew E. Taylor (supervising sound editors); Rickley W. Dumm (sound designer); Mark Allen (sound effects editor); John Sanacore, Clayton Weber (Foley editors); John Creed, Harrison Meyle (dialogue editors); Michael Brake (music editor); Alyson Dee Moore, Christopher Moriana (Foley artists)	HBO
2019	Battle at Big Rock		Oliver Tarney (supervising sound editor); Michael Fentum, Oriol Tarragó (sound designers); Gwendolyn Yates Whittle (supervising ADR editor); Dawn Gough (sound editor); Hugo Adams (Foley editor); Rachael Tate (dialogue editor); Sue Harding, Andrea King (Foley artists)	FX
2019	Fleabag	"Episode 1"	Jack Gillies (sound effects editor); Clare Mahoney (Foley editor); Harry Platford, Michael Williams (dialogue editors)	Amazon
2019	Ballers	"Players Only"	Mark Relyea (supervising sound editor); Julie Altus (supervising ADR editor); Daisuke Sawa (sound effects editor); Damien Smith (Foley editor); Robert Guastini, Chris Kahwaty (dialogue editors); Bruno Roussel (music editor); Jesi Ruppel, Joseph T. Sabella (Foley artists)	HBO
2019	The Good Place	"The Answer"	Brent Findley (supervising sound editor); Kevin McCullough (sound effects editor); Terry Boyd Jr. (Foley editor); Michael Jesmer (dialogue editor); Bryant J. Fuhrmann, Jason Tregoe Newman, Jason Ryterband (music editors); Elizabeth Rainey, Jody Thomas (Foley artists)	NBC
2019	Servant	"Reborn"	Sean Garnhart (supervising sound editor), Alexa Zimmerman (supervising ADR editor), Mark Filip (sound effects editor), Julien Pirrie (Foley editor), Fred Rosenberg (dialogue editor), Lesley Langs (music editor), Gareth Rhys Jones (Foley artist)	Apple TV+
2019	Star Trek: Short Treks	"The Trouble with Edward"	Matthew E. Taylor (supervising sound editor); Tim Farrell (sound designer); Trevor Sperry (Foley editor); Sean Heissinger (dialogue editor); Matt Decker (music editor); Ginger Geary, Doug Madick (Foley artists)	CBS All Access
2019	Stucco		Csaba Wagner (supervising sound editor, sound designer); David Farmer (supervising sound editor); Samuel Justice (sound designer); Graham Donnelly, Michael Orlowski (sound effects editors); Karina Rezhevska (Foley editor); Frank Scheuring (dialogue editor); Nataliia Syaryakova (Foley artist)	Safe Haven Productions

=== 2020s ===
Year	Program	Episode(s)	Nominees	Network
2020	Servant	"2:00"	Sean Garnhart (supervising sound editor), Mark Filip (sound effects editor), Julien Pirrie (Foley editor), Michael Feuser (dialogue editor), Lesley Langs (music editor), Gareth Rhys Jones (Foley artist)	Apple TV+
2020	Brooklyn Nine-Nine	"Lights Out"	Danika Wikke (supervising sound editor); Mark Cookson (sound effects editor); Amy Barber, Julia Huberman (Foley editors); Joe Schiff (dialogue editor); Tessa Phillips (music editor); Jonathan Bruce, Ben Parker (Foley artists)	NBC
2020	A Parks and Recreation Special		Brent Findley (supervising sound editor); Michael Jesmer (dialogue editor); Bryant J. Fuhrmann, Jason Tregoe Newman (music editors)	NBC
2020	Homecoming	"Giant"	Kevin Buchholz, Brett Hinton (supervising sound editors); Daniel Colman (sound designer); Dan Kremer (sound effects editor); Randy Guth (Foley editor); Helen Luttrell, Polly McKinnon (dialogue editors); Ben Zales (music editor); Dominique Decaudain, Pamela Kahn, Mike Marino, Nancy Parker (Foley artists)	Amazon
2020	I May Destroy You	"Eyes Eyes Eyes Eyes"	Jim Goddard (supervising sound editor), Joe Beal (sound designer), Alex Sidiropoulos (Foley editor), Tom Deane (dialogue editor), Anna Wright (Foley artist)	HBO
2020	Dead to Me	"If You Only Knew"	Walter Newman (supervising sound editor); Darleen Stoker (supervising ADR editor); Ron Salalses (sound effects editor); Peter Reynolds, Arno Stephanian (Foley editors); Amber Funk (music editor); Sanaa Kelley, Matt Salib (Foley artists)	Netflix
2020	Space Force	"The Launch"	Paul Hammond, Bobby Mackston (supervising sound editors); Sean Garnhart (sound effects editor); Alfredo Douglas, Aran Tanchum (Foley editors); Jason Tregoe Newman, Tessa Philips (music editors); Vincent Guisetti (Foley artist)	Netflix
2020	Ted Lasso	"The Hope That Kills You"	Brent Findley (supervising sound editor); Kip Smedley (sound effects editors); Jordan McClain (Foley editor); Bernard Weiser (dialogue editor); Richard Brown, Sharyn Gersh (music editors); Sanaa Kelley, Matt Salib (Foley artists)	Apple TV+
2021	Outstanding Achievement in Sound Editing – 1/2 Hour – Comedy or Drama			
2021	Only Murders in the Building	"The Boy From 6B"	Mathew Waters (supervising sound editor); Danika Wikke (dialogue editor); Meredith Stacy (sound effects editor); Micha Liberman (music editor)	Hulu
2021	Hacks	"There Is No Line"	Brett Hinton (supervising sound editor); Marc Glassman (sound effects editor); Ryne Gierke (dialogue editor); Samuel Munoz (Foley editor); Noel Vought (Foley artist); Jason Tregoe Newman (music editor)	HBO Max
2021	The Kominsky Method	"The Round Toes, of the High Shoes"	Lou Thomas (supervising sound editor); Mark Messick, TJ Jacques (sound effects editors); Clay Weber (Foley editor); Sanaa Kelley (Foley artist)	Netflix
2021	Mythic Quest	"Everlight"	Matthew E. Taylor (supervising sound editor); Pete Nichols (sound designer); Matthew Wilson (sound effects editor); Sean Heissinger (dialogue editor); David Jobe (Foley editor); Elizabeth Rainey, Jody Holwadel Thomas (Foley artists); Joe Deveau (music editor)	Apple TV+
2021	Schmigadoon!	"Suddenly"	Cormac Funge (supervising sound editor); Peter Nichols (sound effects editor); John Green (dialogue editor)	Apple TV+
2021	We Are Lady Parts	"Sparta"	Jay Price (supervising sound editor); Tom Foster (sound editor); Dario Swade (dialogue editor); Sam Walsh (Foley editor)	Peacock
2021	What We Do in the Shadows	"The Escape"	Steffan Falesitch (supervising sound editor); David Barbee (sound effects editor); Chris Kahwaty (dialogue editor); John Guentner, Sam Lewis (Foley editors); Ellen Heuer (Foley artist); Steve Griffen (music editor)	FX
2022	Outstanding Achievement in Sound Editing – Broadcast Short Form			
2022	The Bear	"Review"	Steve "Major" Giammaria (supervising sound editor); Jonathan Fuhrer (sound effects editor); Evan Benjamin (dialogue editor); Annie Taylor (Foley editor); Leslie Bloome (Foley artist)	Hulu
2022	Barry	"710N"	Sean Heissinger, Matthew E. Taylor (supervising sound editors); Rickley W. Dumm (sound designer); Deron Street, Candice Brunello, Charles Campagna (sound effects editor); John Creed (dialogue editor); Darrin Mann (Foley editor); Clay Weber (supervising Foley editor); Alyson Dee Moore, Chris Moriana (Foley artist)	HBO
2022	Only Murders in the Building	"Framed"	Mathew Waters, Danika Wikke (supervising sound editors); Eric Offin (sound effects editor); Borja Sau (supervising dialogue editor); Arno Stephanian (Foley editor); Sanaa Kelley, Adam DeCoster (Foley artists)	Hulu
2022	She-Hulk: Attorney at Law	"Ribbit and Rip It"	Mac Smith (supervising sound editor); Steve Bissinger (sound designer); Tim Farrell, Goeun Everett (sound effects editors); Vanessa Lapato (dialogue/ADR supervisor); Ryan Cota (dialogue editor); Ian Chase (Foley editor); Joel Raabe (Foley supervisor); Sean England, Andrea Gard (Foley artists); Kim B. Christensen (conforming editor)	Disney+
2022	Wild Babies	"Big Families"	Matt Coster (supervising sound editor); Matt Coster, Ben Wood (sound designers); Matt Coster, Ben Wood (sound effects editors); Matt Coster, Ben Wood (Foley editors)	Netflix

== Programs with multiple nominations ==
2 nominations

- Ballers (HBO)
- Barry (HBO)
- The Good Place (NBC)
- Star Trek: Short Treks (CBS All Access)
- Servant (Apple TV+)
