= Golden Reel Awards 2020 =

Sound editing awards

68th Golden Reel Awards
- Date: April 16, 2021
- Presented by: Motion Picture Sound Editors

Highlights
- Dialogue and ADR: The Trial of the Chicago 7
- Sound Effects and Foley: Greyhound

The 68th Golden Reel Awards, were held on April 16, 2021, by the Motion Picture Sound Editors (M.P.S.E.) to honor the best in sound editing for film, television, computer entertainment and student productions. The nominations were announced on March 1, 2021.

== Winners and nominees ==
The winners are on bold.

=== Film ===
Outstanding Achievement in Sound Editing – Dialogue and ADR for Feature Film	Outstanding Achievement in Sound Editing – Sound Effects and Foley for Feature Film
The Trial of the Chicago 7 – Renée Tondelli (supervising sound/ADR editor); Michael Hertlein, Jon Michaels, Jeena Schoenke (dialogue editors); Emperor – Glenn Morgan, D. Chris Smoth (supervising sound editors); Robert Jackson (dialogue editor); Greyhound – Will Digby, Michael Minkler, Warren Shaw (supervising sound editors); Dave McMoyler (supervising ADR editor); Paul Carden, Michelle Pazer, David Tichauer (dialogue editors); Ma Rainey's Black Bottom – Skip Lievsay, Paul Urmson (supervising sound editors); Lidia Tamplenizza (supervising ADR editor); Michael Feuser (dialogue editor); Mank – Ren Klyce, Jeremy Molod (supervising sound editors); Richard Quinn (supervising ADR editor); Cameron Barker, Lisa Chino, Kim Foscato (dialogue editor); News of the World – Oliver Tarney (supervising sound editor), Rachael Tate (supervising dialogue editor), Anna MacKenzie (supervising ADR editor); Nomadland – Sergio Díaz, Zach Seivers (supervising sound editors); Sound of Metal – Nicolas Becker (supervising sound editor), Carolina Santana (supervising ADR editor), Michelle Couttolenc (dialogue editor)	Greyhound – Will Digby, Michael Minkler, Warren Shaw (supervising sound editors); Ann Scibelli, Jon Title (sound designers); Odin Benitez, Jason King, Richard Kitting (sound effects editors); Luke Gibleon (Foley editor); Marko Costanzo (Foley artist); Cherry – Mark Binder (supervising sound editor); Matthew Coby, Donald Flick, Michael Gilbert (sound effects editors); The Midnight Sky – Bjørn Schroeder, Randy Thom (supervising sound editors); Kyrsten Mate (sound designer); Leff Lefferts (sound effects editor); Nicholas Docter (Foley editor); Shelley Roden, John Roesch (Foley artists); News of the World – Oliver Tarney (supervising sound editor); Mike Fentum (sound designer); Dawn Gough, Kevin Penney (sound effects editors); Hugo Adams (Foley editor); Oliver Ferris, Sue Harding, Andrea King (Foley artists); Sound of Metal – Nicolas Becker (supervising sound editor), Carolina Santana (sound effects editor), Pietu Korhonen (Foley editor), Heikke Kossi (Foley artist); Tenet – Richard King (supervising sound editor); Joseph Fraioli, Mark Larry, Michael W. Mitchell (sound effects editors); Angela Ang, Bruce Tanis (Foley editors); John Cucci, Catherine Harper, Alyson Dee Moore, Chris Moriana, Dan O'Connell, Shelley Roden, John Roesch, Katie Rose (Foley artists); Wonder Woman 1984 – Jimmy Boyle, Richard King (supervising sound editors); Michael Babcock, Jeff Sawyer, Rowan Watson (sound effects editors); Lily Blazewicz, Kevin Penney (Foley editors); Peter Burgess, Zoe Freed (Foley artists)
Outstanding Achievement in Sound Editing – Feature Underscore	Outstanding Achievement in Sound Editing – Musical for Feature Film
Tenet – Alex Gibson (supervising music editor), Nicholas Fitzgerald (music artists); The Invisible Man – Brett "Snacky" Pierce (supervising music editor), Devaughn Watts (sound editor); The Midnight Sky – Michael Alexander (supervising music editor), Peter Clarke (scoring editor); News of the World – Arabella Winter (supervising music editor); David Olson, Jim Weidman (music editors); Sound of Metal – Carolina Santana (supervising music editor); Nicolas Becker, Abraham Marder (scoring editors); The Trial of the Chicago 7 – Allegra de Souza (music editor); Wonder Woman 1984 – Gerard McCann, Ryan Rubin (supervising music editors); Michael Connell, Timeri Duplat (music editors); Chris Barrett, Adam Miller, Alfredo Pasquel (scoring editors)	Eurovision Song Contest: The Story of Fire Saga – Allegra De Souza, Jon Mooney, Peter Oso Snell (music editors); The 40-Year-Old Version – Lightchild (music editor); The High Note – Louis Schultz (music editor); I Am Woman – Stuart Morton (supervising music editor); Bry Jones, Michael Tan (music editors); Ma Rainey's Black Bottom – Todd Kasow (supervising music editor), Tim Marchiafava (music editor); The Prom – Nick Baxter, David Klotz (music editors)
Outstanding Achievement in Sound Editing – Sound Effects, Foley, Dialogue and ADR for Animated Feature Film	Outstanding Achievement in Sound Editing – Sound Effects, Foley, Dialogue and ADR for Foreign Language Feature Film
Soul – Coya Elliott (supervising sound editor); Cheryl Nardi (supervising dialogue editor); Ren Klyce (sound designer); Steve Orlando, Kimberly Patrick, Jonathan Stevens (sound effects editors); Thom Brennan (Foley editor); Shelley Roden, John Roesch, Dee Selby (Foley artists); The Croods: A New Age – Brian Chumney, Leff Lefferts (supervising sound editors); Randy Thom (sound designer); Rick Hromadka (sound designers); Dominick Certo (supervising music editor); Pascal Garneau, Mac Smith (sound effects editors); Doug Winningham, Dee Selby (Foley editors); Jonathan Greber (dialogue editor); Ronni Brown, Shelley Roden, John Roesch, Janna Vance (Foley editors); Onward – Shannon Mills (supervising sound editor); Nia Hansen (sound designer); Chris Gridley (supervising dialogue editor); Josh Gold, David C. Hughes, Samson Neslund, Kimberly Patrick (sound effects editors); Christopher Flick, Steve Orlando (Foley editors); Erich Stratmann (music editors); Shelley Roden, John Roesch (Foley artists); Over the Moon – Jeremy Bowker, Qianbaihui Yang (supervising sound editors); Chris Frazier, Alyssa Nevarez, Larry Oatfield, Dee Selby (Foley editors); Bradley Farmer (music editor); Ronni Brown, Jana Vance (Foley artists); Wolfwalkers – Sebastien Marquilly, Bruno Seznec, Christian Seznec (supervising sound editors); Baptiste Bouche, Felix Davin, Alexandre Fleurant, Axel Steichen (sound effects editors); Stéphane Werner (Foley editor); Anne-Lyse Haddak (dialogue editor); Florian Fabre (Foley artist)	The Eight Hundred – Kang Fu (supervising sound designer/editor), Steve Miller (sound effects editor), Ai Long Tan (dialogue editor), Fei Yu (music editor); Bacurau – Ricardo Cutz Gaudenzi (supervising sound editor), Matheus Miguens (sound effects editor), Rafael Faustino (Foley editor), Victor Quintanilha (dialogue editor), Pedro Coelho (Foley artist); I'm No Longer Here – Javier Umpierrez (supervising sound editor), Lía Perez (Foley editor), Juan Sosa Rosell (dialogue editor), Javier Umpierrez (music editor), Marisela Suárez (Foley artist); Jallikattu – Renganaath Ravee (supervising sound editor); Boney M. Joy, Sreejith Sreenivasan, Arun Rama Varma (sound effects editors); Mohammad Iqbal Paratwada, Amandeep Singh (Foley artists); The Life Ahead – Maurizio Argentieri (supervising sound designer/editor), Riccardo Righini (dialogue editor), Mauro Eusepi (Foley artist)
Outstanding Achievement in Sound Editing – Feature Documentary
The Reason I Jump – Laurence Love Greed, Alexej Mungersdorff, Jack Wensley (sound effects editors), Jamie McPhee (dialogue editor), Srdjan Kurpjel (Foley editor); Bee Gees: How Can You Mend a Broken Heart – Jonathan Greber (supervising sound editor), Pascal Garneau (sound effects editor); Crip Camp – Jacob Bloomfield-Misrach (supervising sound editor), Greg Francis (dialogue editor), Bijan Sharifi, William Sammons, James LeBrecht (sound designers); John Lewis: Good Trouble – Richard Gould (sound effects editor), Christopher Barnett (sound designer); My Octopus Teacher – Barry Donnelly (supervising sound editor), Charl Mostert (Foley artist); Rebuilding Paradise – David Hughes, Richard Gould (sound effects editors), Christopher Barnett (sound designer); The Social Dilemma – Richard Gould (supervising sound editor), James Spencer (dialogue editor), Andrea Gard (Foley artist); Zappa – Lon Bender (supervising sound editor), Ryan Owens, George Anderson, Nick Pavey (dialogue editors), Alex Nomick, P. Daniel Newman, Chris Kahwaty (sound effects editors)

=== Broadcast Media ===
Outstanding Achievement in Sound Editing – Dialogue and ADR for Episodic Long Form Broadcast Media	Outstanding Achievement in Sound Editing – Dialogue and ADR for Episodic Short Form Broadcast Media
The Queen's Gambit (for "End Game") – Gregg Swiatlowski (supervising sound editor); Eric Hirsch (dialogue editor); Eric Hoehn, Leo Marcel, Wylie Stateman (ADR editors) (Netflix); Better Call Saul (for "Something Unforgivable") – Nick Forshager (supervising sound editor), Kathryn Madsen (supervising ADR editor), Jane Boegel (dialogue editor) (AMC); The Crown (for "Fairytale") – Lee Walpole (supervising sound editor); Jeff Richardson (dialogue editor); Steve Little, Tom Williams (ADR editors) (Netflix); Dark (for "Life and Death") – Alexander Wuertz (supervising sound editor), Thomas Kalbér (supervising dialogue editor), Benjamin Hörbe (supervising ADR editor), Gaston Ibarroule (dialogue editor), Clemens Nürnberger (ADR editor) (Netflix); Fargo (for "The Pretend War") – Nick Forshager (supervising sound editor), Todd Niesen (supervising dialogue editor), Tim Boggs (supervising ADR editor) (FX); Ozark (for "All In") – Nick Forshager (supervising sound editor), Todd Niesen (dialogue editor), Stephen Grubbs (ADR editor) (Netflix); Star Trek: Picard (for "The Impossible Box") – Matthew E. Taylor (supervising sound editor), Sean Heissinger (dialogue editor) (CBS All Access); Westworld (for "The Mother of Exiles") – Sue Gamsaragan Cahill (supervising sound editor); Jane Boegel-Koch, Tim Tuchrello (dialogue editors) (HBO)	The Mandalorian (for "Chapter 13: The Jedi") – David Acord, Matthew Wood (supervising sound editors); Richard Quinn (dialogue editor); James Spencer (ADR editor) (Disney+); Agents of S.H.I.E.L.D. (for "What We're Fighting For") – Daniel Colman (supervising sound editor), Stefani Feldman (supervising dialogue editor), Fernanda Domene (dialogue editor) (ABC); Babylon Berlin (for "Episode 28") – Frank Kruse (supervising sound editor), Alexander Buck (supervising dialogue editor), Benjamin Hörbe (supervising ADR editor) (Netflix); The Flight Attendant (for "Other People's Houses") – Mike Marchain (supervising sound editor); Julie Altus, Doug Mountain, Vince Tennant (dialogue editors) (HBO Max); Locke & Key (for "Crown of Shadows") – Dustin Harris (supervising sound editor), Jill Purdy (dialogue editor) (Netflix); The Right Stuff (for "Flight") – Walter Newman (supervising sound editor), Brian Armstrong (supervising ADR editor), Darleen Stoker (dialogue editor) (Disney+); Snowpiercer (for "Trouble Comes Sideways") – Sandra Portman (supervising sound editor), Eric Mouawad (dialogue/ADR editor), Francisco Frial (ADR editor) (TNT); The Umbrella Academy (for "The End of Something") – John Benson (supervising sound editor), Jason Krane (dialogue editor) (Netflix)
Outstanding Achievement in Sound Editing – Sound Effects and Foley for Episodic Long Form Broadcast Media	Outstanding Achievement in Sound Editing – Sound Effects and Foley for Episodic Short Form Broadcast Media
The Queen's Gambit (for "End Game") – Eric Hirsch, Gregg Swiatlowski (supervising sound editor); Wylie Stateman (sound designer); Patrick Cicero, Eric Hoehn, Leo Marcil, James David Redding III (sound effects editors); Rachel Chancey (Foley artist/editor) (Netflix); Star Trek: Picard (for "Et in Arcadia Ego, Part 2") – Matthew E. Taylor (supervising sound editor); Harry Cohen, Tim Farrell (sound designers); Michael Schapiro (sound effects editors); Darrin Mann, Clay Webber (Foley editors); Alyson Dee Moore, Chris Moriana (Foley artists) (CBS All Access); Better Call Saul (for "Bagman") – Nick Forshager, Kathryn Madsen (supervising sound editors); Todd Toon (sound designer); Matt Temple (sound effects editor); Jeff Cranford (Foley editor); Gregg Barbanell, Alex Ulrich (foley asrtists) (AMC); Devs (for "Episode 3") – Glenn Freemantle (supervising sound editor/sound designer); Ben Barker (supervising sound editor); Danny Freemantle, Nick Freemantle, Dayo James, Rob Malone (sound effects editors); Lilly Blazewicz (Foley editor); Peter Burgis, Zoe Freed (Foley artists) (FX); Ozark (for "All In") – Nick Forshager (supervising sound editor); Mark Allen, Matt Decker, Matt Temple (sound effects editors); Amy Barber, Jonathan Bruce, Julia Huberman (Foley editors); Jonathan Bruce, Ben Parker (Foley artists) (Netflix); Raised By Wolves (for "Raise By Wolves") – Victor Ennis (supervising sound editors), Jamey Scott (sound designer/effects editor), Dawn Lunsford, Alicia Stevenson (Foley editor) (HBO Max); Star Trek: Discovery (for "That Hope Is You, Part 1") – Matthew E. Taylor (supervising sound editor); Harry Cohen, Tim Farrell (sound designers); Michael Schapiro (sound effects editors); Darrin Mann, Clay Webber (Foley editors); Alyson Dee Moore, Chris Moriana (Foley artists) (CBS All Access); Westworld (for "The Mother of Exiles") – Sue Gamsaragan Cahill (supervising sound editor); Benjamin Cook (sound designer), Shaughnessy Hare (sound effects editor), Brendan Croxon (Foley editor), Adrian Medhurst (Foley artist) (HBO)	The Mandalorian (for "Chapter 13: The Jedi") – David Acord, Matthew Wood (supervising sound editors); Benjamin A. Burtt, J.R. Grubbs (sound effects editors); Richard Gould (Foley editor); Ronni Brown, Jana Vance (Foley artists) (Disney+); The 100 (for "The Final War") – Norval Crutcher, Vincent Tennant (supervising sound editors); Peter D. Lago (sound designer); Adam DeCoster, Jacob Houchen, Clayton Webber (Foley editors); Sanaa Kelley (Foley artist) (The CW); Agents of S.H.I.E.L.D. (for "What We're Fighting For") – Daniel Colman (supervising sound editor); Randall Guth (Foley editor); Dominique Decaudain, Pamela Kahn, Mike Marino, Nancy Parker (Foley artists) (ABC); The Alienist (for "Belly of the Beast") – Matthew Skelding (supervising sound editor); Tom Jenkins, Al Sirkett (sound designers); Mathias Schuster (Foley editor); Barnaby Smyth (Foley artist) (TNT); Hanna (for "The Trial") – Joe Beal (supervising sound editor), Steve Browell (sound designer), Phillip Clements (Foley editor), Anna Wright (Foley artist) (Amazon); Locke & Key (for "Head Games") – J.R. Fountain (supervising sound editor), Dashen Naidoo (sound effects editor), Steve Baine (Foley artist) (Netflix); The Right Stuff (for "Sierra Hotel") – Walter Newman (supervising sound editor); Kenneth Young (sound designer); Rickley W. Dumm (sound effects editor); Peter Reynolds (Foley editor); Adam DeCoster, Sanna Kelley (Foley artists) (Disney+); Snowpiercer (for "Trouble Comes Sideways") – Sandra Portman (supervising sound editor), James Fonnyadt (sound designer), Gregorio Gomez (sound effects editor), Dario DiSanto (Foley editor), Maureen Murphy (Foley artist) (TNT)
Outstanding Achievement in Sound Editing – Sound Effects, Foley, Music, Dialogue and ADR for Non-Theatrical Feature Film Broadcast Media	Outstanding Achievement in Sound Editing – Sound Effects, Foley, Music, Dialogue and ADR for Non-Theatrical Animated Long Form Broadcast Media
The Ultimate Playlist of Noise – Odin Benitez (supervising sound editor); Russell Topal (sound designer); Ryan Briley (supervising ADR editor); Rustam Gimadlyev (Foley editor); Katerina Tolkishevskaya (music editor); Natalia Syeryakova, Bogdan Zavarzin (Foley artist) (Hulu); Bad Education – Gene Park (supervising sound editor), Ric Schnupp (sound effects editor), Craig Kyllonen (dialogue editor), Colin Alexander (ADR editor), Shari Johanson (music editor) (HBO); Bliss – Steve Boeddeker, Lee Salevan (supervising sound editors); Igor Nikolić (Foley editor); Michael Feuser (dialogue editor); Lidia Tamplenizza (ADR editor); Jay Peck (Foley artist) (Amazon); Blow the Man Down – Chris Foster (supervising sound editor); Laura Heinzinger (Foley editors); Michael Flannery, Matt Rigby (dialogue editors); John Bowen, Nora Linde (ADR editors); Brian McOmber (music editor) (Amazon); The Bygone – David Barber (supervising sound editor); Dave Eichhorn, George Haddad, Roland Thai, Ben Zarai (sound effects editors); Michael Kreple (Foley editor); Gonzalo "Bino" Espinoza, David Kitchens (dialogue editors) (Tubi); Dolly Parton's Christmas on the Square – Trip Brock (supervising sound editor); Jacob Ortiz (supervising ADR editor); Marc S. Perlman, Michael T. Ryan (supervising music editors); Raymond Park (sound effects editor); Jackie Johnson, Bruce Stubblefield (dialogue editors); Michael Farrow, Tom Ruttledge (music editors) (Netflix); Safety – Christopher S. Aud, Byron Wilson (supervising sound editors); Steve Durkee (supervising music editor); Phil Barrie, Greg ten Bosch, Aaron Glascock (sound effects editors); Terry Rodman (Foley editor); Daniel Saxlid (dialogue editor); Sanaa Kelley, Matt Salib (Foley artists) (Disney); Troop Zero – Sean McCormick, Erin Oakley (supervising sound editors); Dylan Barfield, Andrew Neil, Paul Pirola (sound effects editors); Troy Mauri (Foley editor); Robert Chen, Will Riley (dialogue editors); Adrian Medhurst (Foley artist) (Amazon)	Mortal Kombat Legends: Scorpion's Revenge – D.J. Lynch, Rob McIntyre (supervising sound editors); Evan Dockter, Marc Schmidt (sound designers); Mark A. Keatts (supervising ADR editor); Roger Pallan, Lawrence Reyes, Ezra Walker (sound effects editors); Roberto Allegria, Derek Swanson (Foley editors); David M. Cowan, Kelly Foley Downs, Patrick Foley, Mike Garcia (dialogue editors); Jon Abelardo, Mark Mercado (ADR editors); Batman: Death in the Family – Devon Bowman (supervising sound editor); Robert Hargreaves (sound designer); Mark A. Keatts (supervising ADR editor); Alfredo Douglas, George Peters (sound effects editors); Kelly Foley Downs, Patrick Foley (dialogue editors); John Reynolds (ADR editor); Christopher Drake (music editor); The Boss Baby: Get That Baby! – Jeff Shiffman (supervising sound editor); Ian Howard, Greg Rubin (sound effects editors); Carol Ma (Foley editor); Kerry Iverson-Brody, Xinyue Yu (dialogue editors); Ducktales: Let's Get Dangerous! – Jeff Shiffman (supervising sound editor), Katie Maynard (sound effects editor), Carol Ma (Foley editor), Xinyue Yu (dialogue editor); The Epic Tales of Captain Underpants:The Xtreme Xploits of the Xplosive Xmas – Jeff Shiffman (supervising sound editor); Kerry Iverson-Brody (supervising dialogue editor); Jessey Drake, Greg Rubin (sound effects editors); Carol Ma (Foley editor); Xinyue Yu (dialogue editor); The Loud House: Schooled! – Tess Fournier (supervising sound editor/sound effects editor); Katie Maynard, Brad Meyer, Tim Vindigni (sound effects editors); Carol Ma (Foley editor); John Deligiannis (dialogue editor); To Your Last Death – Michael Archacki (supervising sound designer/editor), Matthew Schaff (sound editor)
Outstanding Achievement in Sound Editing – Episodic Long Form – Music	Outstanding Achievement in Sound Editing – Episodic Short Form – Music
The Queen's Gambit (for "Adjournment") – Tom Kramer (music editor) (Netflix); Better Call Saul (for "Magic Man") – Jason Tregoe Newman (music editor) (AMC); The Boys (for "Nothing Like It in The World") – Christopher Brooks (music editor) (Amazon); Bridgerton (for "Shock and Delight") – Brittany Dubay (music editor) (Netflix); Ozark (for "Kevin Cronin Was Here") – Jason Tregoe Newman, Stephen Lotwis (music editors) (Netflix); Raised By Wolves (for "Pilot") – James Bladon, Lewis Morison, David Menke (music editors) (HBO Max)	Vikings (for "The Best Laid Plans") – Yuri Gorbachow, MPSE; Mikaila Simmons (supervising music editors), Lise Beauchesne (music editor) (Amazon); The Alienist (for "Belly of the Beast") – Ali Hawkins (supervising music editor) (TNT); Hollywood (for "Hooray for Hollywood") – David Klotz (supervising music editor) (Netflix); Selena: The Series – Max Cremona (music editor) (Netflix); Snowpiercer (for "Trouble Comes Sideways)" – Michael Baber, Alex Heller (music editors) (TNT); The Umbrella Academy (for "Valhalla") – Jen Malone (music supervisor), Lodge Worster (music editor) (Netflix); Zoey's Extraordinary Playlist (for "Pilot") – Jaclyn Newman Dorn (supervising music editor) (NBC)
Outstanding Achievement in Sound Editing – Sound Effects, Foley, Music, Dialogue and ADR for Live Action Broadcast Media Under 35 Minutes	Outstanding Achievement in Sound Editing – Single Presentation
Servant (for "2:00") – Sean Garnhart (supervising sound editor), Mark Filip (sound effects editor), Julien Pirrie (Foley editor), Michael Feuser (dialogue editor), Lesley Langs (music editor), Gareth Rhys Jones (Foley artist) (Apple TV+); Brooklyn Nine-Nine (for "Lights Out") – Danika Wikke (supervising sound editor); Mark Cookson (sound effects editor); Amy Barber, Julia Huberman (Foley editors); Joe Schiff (dialogue editor); Tessa Phillips (music editor); Jonathan Bruce, Ben Parker (Foley artists) (NBC); Dead to Me (for "If You Only Knew") – Walter Newman (supervising sound editor); Darleen Stoker (supervising ADR editor); Ron Salalses (sound effects editor); Peter Reynolds, Arno Stephanian (Foley editors); Amber Funk (music editor); Sanaa Kelley, Matt Salib (Foley artists) (Netflix); Homecoming (for "Giant") – Kevin Buchholz, Brett Hinton (supervising sound editors); Daniel Colman (sound designer); Dan Kremer (sound effects editor); Randy Guth (Foley editor); Helen Luttrell, Polly McKinnon (dialogue editors); Ben Zales (music editor); Dominique Decaudain, Pamela Kahn, Mike Marino, Nancy Parker (Foley artists) (Amazon); I May Destroy You (for "Eyes Eyes Eyes Eyes") – Jim Goddard (supervising sound editor), Joe Beal (sound designer), Alex Sidiropoulos (Foley editor), Tom Deane (dialogue editor), Anna Wright (Foley artist) (HBO); A Parks and Recreation Special – Brent Findley (supervising sound editor); Michael Jesmer (dialogue editor); Bryant J. Fuhrmann, Jason Tregoe Newman (music editors) (NBC); Space Force (for "The Launch") – Paul Hammond, Bobby Mackston (supervising sound editors); Sean Garnhart (sound effects editor); Alfredo Douglas, Aran Tanchum (Foley editors); Jason Tregoe Newman, Tessa Philips (music editors); Vincent Guisetti (Foley artist) (Netflix); Ted Lasso (for "The Hope That Kills You") – Brent Findley (supervising sound editor); Kip Smedley (sound effects editors); Jordan McClain (Foley editor); Bernard Weiser (dialogue editor); Richard Brown, Sharyn Gersh (music editors); Sanaa Kelley, Matt Salib (Foley artists) (Apple TV+)	A Christmas Carol – Lee Walpole, MPSE (supervising sound editor), Saoirse Christopherson, Andy Kennedy (sound effects editors), Ian Wilkinson (dialogue editor), Catherine Thomas, Anna Wright (Foley editors), Cecile Tournesac (music editor) (FX); The Comey Rule (for "Episode 2") – Andrew DeCristofaro, MPSE; Darren "Sunny" Warkentin, MPSE (supervising sound editors), Mike Payne, MPSE; Hector C. Gika, MPSE (sound effects editors), Alexander Jongbloed (Foley editor), David Metzner (music editor) (Showtime); Hamilton – Tony Volante (supervising sound editor), Dave Paterson (sound effects editor), Nevin Steinberg (sound designer), Dan Timmons, Derik Lee (music editors) (Disney+); Into the Dark (for "The Current Occupant") – Roland Thai, MPSE; Justin W. Walker (supervising sound editors), Amy Barber, Julia Huberman, Richard Wills (Foley editors), Jonathan Bruce (Foley artist), Mark Skillingberg (music editor) (Hulu); Self Made: Inspired by the Life of Madam C.J. Walker (for "The Fight of the Century") – Bobbi Banks (supervising sound editor), Ezra Dweck, Paul Menichini (sound designers), Bernard Weiser, MPSE (dialogue editor), Butch Wolf (Foley editor), Sanaa Kelley (Foley artist), Stephen Lotwis (music editor) (Netflix); Unorthodox (for "Part 1") – Daniel Iribarren (supervising sound editor), Toby Bilz (ADR editor), Sebastian Morsch, Paul Rischer (sound designers), Victor Shcheglov (Foley artist) (Netflix)
Outstanding Achievement in Sound Editing – Animation Short Form	Outstanding Achievement in Sound Editing – Non-Theatrical Documentary
Baba Yaga – Scot Stafford (supervising sound editor), Andrew Vernon, Jamey Scott (sound designer), Brendan Wolf (sound effects editor), Rex Darnell (music editor) (Amazon); Archer (for "Cold Fusion") – JC Richardson, Pierre Cerrato (sound designers), JG Thirlwell (music editor) (FX); The Boss Baby: Back in Business (for "Escape From Krinkles") – Jeff Shiffman (supervising sound editor), Greg Rubin, Ian Howard (sound effects editors), Iverson-Brody, Xinyue Yu (dialogue editors), Carol Ma (Foley editor) (Netflix); Canvas – Andre Fenley, Jermaine Stegall (supervising sound editors), Justin Pearson (sound designer), Andrew Vernon (sound effects editor), Frank Aglieri-Rinella (Foley artist) (Netflix); Star Wars: The Clone Wars (for "The Phantom Apprentice") – Matthew Wood, David Acord (supervising sound editors), Kimberly Patrick (sound effects editor), Frank Rinella (Foley editor), Margie O'Malley (Foley artist), Tony Diaz (dialogue editor), Peter Lam (music editor) (Disney+); Star Trek: Short Treks (for "Ephraim and Dot") – Matthew E. Taylor (supervising sound editor), Tim Farrell, Harry Cohen (sound designer), Moira Marquis, Stan Jones (music director), Sean Heissinger (ADR editor) (CBS All Access); Wizards (for "Spellbound") – James Miller, Otis Van Osten (supervising sound editors), Tommy Sarioglou, Aran Tanchum (Foley editor), Carlos Sanches, Jason Oliver (dialogue editors), Vincent Guisetti (Foley artist) (Netflix)	Laurel Canyon: A Place in Time (for "Episode 1") – Jonathan Greber (supervising sound editor), Lucas Miller (sound effects editor) (Epix/Amblin); Be Water – Nas Parkash (supervising sound editor) (ESPN); Beastie Boys Story – Martyn Zub (supervising sound editor), Paul Aulicino (sound effects editors) (Apple TV+); Bruce Springsteen's Letter to You – Steve Urban (supervising sound editor), Brandon Duncan (music editor) (Apple TV+); High Score (for "Boom & Bust") – Keith Hodne (supervising sound editor) (Netflix); Jeffrey Epstein: Filthy Rich (for "The Island") – R. Hollis Smith (supervising sound editor) (Netflix); The Last Dance (for "Episode 1") – Keith Hodne (supervising sound editor) (Netflix)

=== Gaming ===
Outstanding Achievement in Sound Editing – Computer Cinematic	Outstanding Achievement in Sound Editing – Computer Interactive Game Play
The Last of Us Part II – Shannon Potter (supervising sound editor), Patrick Ginn, Kyle Bailey, Michael Finley, Chad Bedell, Eric Paulsen, Keith Bilderbeck, Jim Diaz (sound effects editors), Dawn Fintor, Alicia Stevenson (Foley artists), Robert Krekel (audio director), Justin Mullens, Beau Jimenez, Neil Uchitel, Jesse Garcia, Michael Marchisotto (sound designers), Rob Goodson, Scott Shoemaker (supervising music editors), Anthony Caruso, Tyler Crowder, Sonia Coronado, Adam Kallibjian, Adam Kallibjian, James Zolyak, Ted Kocher, Scott Bergstrom, Tao-Ping Chen (music editors); Destiny 2: Beyond Light – David Henry (director of sound design), Skye Lewin, Michael Salvatori, Josh Mosser, Michael Sechrist (music editors), Adam Boyd, MPSE; Bryen Hensley, Evan Buehler (supervising sound editors), Josh Mosser (dialogue de-noising), Stosh Tuszynski, Katie Waters, Nick Interlandi, John Loranger, Jon Persson (sound designer); Ghost of Tsushima – Glen Gathard (supervising sound editor), Kyle Richards (dialogue lead), Adam Oakley, Jimmy Boyle, Peter Hanson, Rowan Watson (sound designers), Dora Filipovic, Sophia Leader, George Lee, James Hayday, George Riley, Stefano Marchetti (sound editors), Zoe Freed, Rebecca Heathcote (Foley artists), Jemma Riley-Tolch (Foley editor); Ori and the Will of the Wisps: Willow Ceremony – Kristoffer Larson (audio director), Guy Whitmore, Alexander Leeman Johnson (audio lead); Spider-Man: Marvel's Miles Morales – Emile Mika, Csaba Wagner, Samuel Justice (supervising sound editor), Zack Boguki, Aaron Sanchez, Jeff Darby, Nate Bonisteel, Gary Miranda, Mark MacBride (sound designers), Rob Goodson, Scott Shoemaker (supervising music editors), Patrick Michalak, Ryan Schaad (dialogue leads), Dwight Okahara (audio leads), Tim Schumann, Alyssa Galindo, Tyler Held, Michelangelo Muscariello, Jaime Marcello (dialogue editors), Tao Ping Chen, Andrew Buresh, Ernest Johnson, Ted Kocher, Sonia Coronado, Scott Bergstrom, Tyler Crowder, Adam Kallibjian, James Zolyak (music editors); Star Wars Jedi: Fallen Order – Bryan O. Watkins (supervising sound editor), Nick Laviers (supervising music editor), Mitchell Osias, Ben Burtt, Michael C. Schapiro, Luis Galdames, Nick Von Kaenel, Sam Bird, Oscar Coen, Paxson Helgesen (sound designers), Caron Weidner (supervising Foley editor), Eric Lindemann, Darren Maynard, Matthew Klimek (Foley editors), Chris Moriana, Alyson D. Moore (Foley artists), Harrison Deutsch (dialogue lead), Dan P. Francis, Garrett Montgomery, Stefan Kovatchev, Nicholas Friedemann, Harrison Deutsch (dialogue editors), Nick Laviers, Kory McMaster (music editors)	The Last of Us Part II – Robert Krekel (audio director), Shannon Potter (supervising sound editor), Maged Khalil Ragab (supervising dialogue editors), Rob Goodson, Scott Shoemaker (supervising music editor), Neil Uchitel, Beau Jimenez, Justin Mullens, Jesse Garcia, Michael Marchisotto, Derek Brown, Jordan Denton (sound designers), Grayson Stone, Julius Kukla, Thomas Barrett, Jaime Marcelo, Erik Schmall, Duncan Brown, Cesar Marenco, Eolyne Arnold(dialogue editors), Patrick Ginn, Michael Finley, Kyle Bailey (sound editors), Anthony Caruso, Tyler Crowder, Tao-Ping Chen, Sonia Coronado, Adam Kallibjian, Samuel Marshall, James Zolyak, Ted Kocher, Scott Bergstrom (music editors), Dawn Fintor, Alicia Stevenson (Foley artists); Ghost of Tsushima – Rev. Dr. Bradley D Meyer (audio director), Adam Lidbetter (audio lead), Peter Scaturro, Keith Leary (supervising music editors), Andrew Buresh, Adam Kallibjian, Nicholas Mastroianni, Sonia Coronado, Ted Kocher (music editors), Kyle Richards (dialogue lead), Heather Plunkard, Kevin McClelland, Bianca Salinas (dialogue editors), Josh Lord, Mike Niederquell, Erik Buensuceso, Safar Bake, Andres Herrera, Michelle Thomas, Michael Pitaniello, Tye Hastings, Rob Castro (sound designers); Spider-Man: Marvel's Miles Morales – Rob Goodson (supervising music editors), Emile Mika (supervising sound editors), Jerry Berlongieri, Jamie McMenamy (audio lead), Patrick Michalak, Ryan Schaad (dialogue lead), Herschell Bailey, Blake Johnson, David Yingling, Brooke Yap, Tyler Cornett, Johannes Hammers, Ryan See, Zack Boguki, Aaron Sanchez, Jeff Darby, Nate Bonisteel (sound designers), Tim Schumann, Tyler Held, Michelangelo Muscariello, Jaime Marcello (dialogue editors), Tao Ping Chen, Andrew Buresh, Ernest Johnson, Ted Kocher, Scott Shoemaker, Sonia Coronado, Scott Bergstrom, Tyler Crowder, Adam Kallibjian, James Zolyak (music editors); Star Wars Jedi: Fallen Order – Nick Von Kaenel, Kevin Notar, Stefan Kovatchev, Oscar Coen, Paxson Helgesen, Sam Bird, Caron Weidner, Mike Schapiro, Ben Burtt, Nick Laviers, Christopher Clanin, Erick Ocampo, Jeremy Rogers, Steve Johnson (sound designers)

=== Student Film ===
Outstanding Achievement in Sound Editing – Student Film (Verna Fields Award)
- The Unknown (National Film and Television School) – Yin Lee (supervising sound editor and sound designer)
  - Kadalin Kural (Annapurna College of Film and Media) – Vandana Ramakrishna (supervising sound editor), Vandana Ramakrishna (dialogue editor), Vandana Ramakrishna (supervising music editor), Vandana Ramakrishna (sound designer), Vandana Ramakrishna (sound effects editor), Varun Arsid (Foley artist)
  - Lakutshon' Ilanga (When the Sun Sets) (Dodge College of Film and Media Arts) – Andree Lin (supervising sound editor), Andree Lin (sound designer), Andrew Gutierrez (Foley artist)
  - Las Escondidas (Chapman University) – Karthik Mohan Vijaymohan (supervising sound editor)
  - Listen to Us (Savannah College of Art and Design) – Juliana Henao (supervising sound editor), Dominique Maio (sound effects editor), Juliana Henao (dialogue editors), Nia R. Dawson (music editor)
  - Meow or Never! (National Film and Television School) – Harry J.N. Parsons (supervising sound designer and editor)
  - O Black Hole! (National Film and Television School) – Ed Rousseau (supervising sound designer and editor)
  - Phantom Spectre (USC School of Cinematic Arts) – Paul J. Vogel (supervising sound editor), Ryan Vaughan, Audrey Gu (dialogue editors), Isa Vogel, Miska Kajanus (Foley artist)
