= Golden Reel Award for Outstanding Achievement in Sound Editing – Dialogue and ADR for Episodic Short Form Broadcast Media =

- Country: United States
- Presented by: Motion Picture Sound Editors
- Currently held by: David Acord, Matthew Wood, Richard Quinn, James Spencer – The Mandalorian (2020)

The Golden Reel Award for Outstanding Achievement in Sound Editing – Dialogue and ADR for Episodic Short Form Broadcast Media is an annual award given by the Motion Picture Sound Editors, honoring sound editors whose work has warranted merit in field of television automated dialogue replacement (ADR) in short form broadcast media.

The "short form" of the title refers to television episodes with runtimes of less than an hour and more than 35 minutes. Other episodes now have their own category. It was first awarded in 1998, for episodes premiering the previous year, under the title Best Sound Editing – Television Episodic – Dialogue & ADR. The term "short form" was added to the category in 2005, though long-form television had had its own category by then. The award has been given with its current title since 2018.

== Winners and nominees ==
=== 1990s ===
Best Sound Editing – Television Episodic – Dialogue & ADR

Year	Program	Episode(s)	Nominees	Network
1997	Roar	"Pilot"	Norval D. Crutcher III (supervising dialogue/ADR editor); Marty Vites (dialogue editor); Andrew Spencer Dawson, Robb Navrides (ADR editors)	Fox
1997	Chicago Hope			CBS
1997	Hercules: The Legendary Journeys			Syndication
1997	Xena: Warrior Princess			Syndication
1997	Millennium			Fox
1997	Roar	"Spear Of Destiny"		Fox
1997	NYPD Blue			ABC
1997	The Practice			ABC
1997	Perversions of Science			HBO
1998	ER	"Exodus"	Walter Newman (supervising sound editor), Darleen Stoker (supervising dialogue editor), Thomas A. Harris (supervising ADR editor), Catherine Flynn (ADR/dialogue editor)	NBC
1998	Buffy the Vampire Slayer			The WB
1998	Earth: Final Conflict		John Douglas Smith (supervising sound editor)	Syndication
1998	Xena: Warrior Princess			Syndication
1998	Nash Bridges			CBS
1998	The X-Files			Fox
1999	The Sopranos	"A Hit Is a Hit"	Ray Spiess (supervising sound/dialogue editor); William H. Angarola (supervising sound editor); Cindy Rabideau (supervision ADR editor); Benjamin Beardwood, Robert Guastini, Anna MacKenzie, Mike Marchain (ADR/dialogue editors); Warren Smith (assistant adr editor); Mathew Price (production mixer); Adam Sawelson (re-recording mixer); Robert Deschaine, Paul J. Zydel (ADR mixers); Tami Treadwell (ADR recordist)	HBO
1999	Ally McBeal	"Car Wash"	David Rawlinson (supervising sound/dialogue/ADR editor); Dennis Gray, Ralph Osborn (dialogue editors); David Melhase (ADR editor)	Fox
1999	Harsh Realm	"Pilot"	Richard Taylor (supervising sound/adr editor); Robert Ewing (supervising sound editor); Barbara Issak (supervising dialogue editor); Benjamin Beardwood, Dennis Gray, Paul Longstaffe (dialogue editors); David Melhase, James A. Williams (ADR editors)	Fox
1999	Buffy the Vampire Slayer	Beer Bad	Cindy Rabideau (supervising sound/dialogue/ADR editor); Anna MacKenzie, Ray Spiess, Daniel Tripoli (dialogue editors); Mark Cleary, Robert Guastini, Mike Marchain (ADR editors)	The WB
1999	ER	"The Storm (Part II)"	Walter Newman (supervising sound editor), Darleen Stoker (supervising dialogue editor), Thomas A. Harris (supervising ADR editor), Bruce M. Honda (adr/dialogue editor)	NBC
1999	Law & Order	"Justice"	Jeffrey Kaplan (supervising sound/dialogue/ADR editor), Steve Burger (ADR editor)	NBC
1999	NYPD Blue	"Voir Dire This"	Jeff Rosen (supervising sound/dialogue/ADR editor); Lukas Bower, John Green (dialogue/ADR editors); Jane Boegel, Russell DeWolf, Sonya Henry, Helen Luttrell (dialogue editors); Barbara J. Boguski (ADR editor)	ABC
1999	The Practice		T.W. Davis (supervising sound/dialogue/ADR editor); Ken Gladden (dialogue/ADR editor); Donna Beltz, H. Jay Levine (dialogue editors); Debby Ruby-Winsberg (ADR editor)	ABC
1999	The X-Files	"The Unnatural"	Thierry J. Couturier (supervising dialogue/ADR editor); Donna Beltz (dialogue/ADR editor); H. Jay Levine, Maciek Malish, James L. Pearson, Gabrielle Gilbert Reeves (dialogue editors); Mike Goodman (ADR editor)	Fox

=== 2000s ===
Year	Program	Episode(s)	Nominees	Network
2000	Third Watch	"Jimmy's Mountain"	Walter Newman (supervising sound editor), Constance A. Kazmer (supervising dialogue editor), John F. Reynolds (supervising ADR editor), Lou Kleinman (sound effects editor)	NBC
2000	City of Angels	"Nathan's Hot Dog"	John Kincade (supervising sound editor), Todd Niesen (sound effects editor)	CBS
2000	Deadline	"Howl"	Lee Dragu (supervising sound editor); Michael Jacobi (supervising ADR editor); Andrew Spencer Dawson, Tom Jaeger, Marty Vites (sound effects editors)	NBC
2000	ER	"May Day"	Walter Newman (supervising sound editor), Darleen Stoker (supervising dialogue editor), Thomas A. Harris (supervising ADR editor), Karyn Foster (sound effects editor)	NBC
2000	The West Wing	"What Kind of Day Has It Been"	Walter Newman (supervising sound editor), Thomas A. Harris (supervising sound/ADR editor), Catherine Flynn (supervising dialogue editor), Jessica Goodwin (sound effects editor)	NBC
2000	Law & Order: Special Victims Unit	"Baby Killer"	Jeffrey Kaplan (supervising sound/ADR editor), Norval D. Crutcher III (supervising dialogue editor)	NBC
2000	Providence	"The Gift"	Robb Navrides (supervising sound/ADR editor), Andrew Spencer Dawson (supervising dialogue editor)	NBC
2000	Touched by an Angel	"Finger of God"	Bill Bell (supervising sound editor); Tim Terusa (supervising dialogue/ADR editor); Rick Crampton, Joy Ealy, Anton Holden, Michael Lyle, Randal S. Thomas, Rusty Tinsley (sound effects editors)	CBS

Sound Editing in Television – Dialogue and ADR, Episodic

Year	Program	Episode(s)	Nominees	Network
2001	Six Feet Under	"Pilot"	Bob Newlan (supervising sound editor); David Beadle, Sonya Henry, Jason Lezama, Helen Luttrell (sound effects editors)	HBO
2001	24	"12:00 a.m. – 1:00 a.m."	William Dotson (supervising sound/dialogue editor); Cathie Speakman (supervising adr editor); Pembrooke Andrews, Richard Taylor (ADR editors); Marty Stein, Daniel Tripoli, Jeffrey R. Whitcher (dialogue editors)	Fox
2001	Alias	"Doppleganger"	Thomas DeGorter (supervising sound editor), Christopher B. Reeves (dialogue editor), Warren Smith (ADR editor)	ABC
2001	NYPD Blue	"Johnny Got His Gold"	Jeff Rosen (supervising sound editor); Patrick Hogan (ADR/dialogue editor); David Beadle, Ralph Osborn (dialogue editors)	ABC
2001	Roswell	"Baby, It's You"	Fred Judkins (supervising sound editor); John Green, Larry Goeb, Patrick Hogan, Jason Lezama, Todd Niesen (dialogue editors); Sonya Henry, Ralph Osborn (ADR editors)	The WB
2001	Sex and the City	"My Motherboard, Myself"	Anthony J. Ciccolini III (supervising sound editor), Bitty O'Sullivan-Smith (supervising dialogue editor), Louis Bertini (supervising ADR editor)	HBO
2001	Third Watch	"Honor"	Walter Newman (supervising sound editor); Constance A. Kazmer (supervising dialogue editor); John F. Reynolds (supervising adr editor); Lou Kleinman, Darleen Stoker (dialogue editors)	NBC
2001	UC: Undercover	"The Siege"	Peter Austin (supervising sound/ADR editor), Edmund J. Lachmann (supervising dialogue editor), Ruth Adelman (sound editor), Jay Keiser (ADR editor)	NBC
2001	The West Wing	"Manchester: Part II"	Walter Newman (supervising sound editor); Catherine Flynn (supervising dialogue editor); Thomas A. Harris (supervising ADR editor); Jennifer Mertens (ADR editor); Eric Hertsguaard, Karen Spangenberg (dialogue editors)	NBC

Best Sound Editing in Television Episodic – Dialogue & ADR

Year	Program	Episode(s)	Nominees	Network
2002	ER	"Partly Cloudy, Chance of Rain"	Walter Newman (supervising sound editor); Darleen Stoker (supervising dialogue editor); Thomas A. Harris (supervising ADR editor); Virginia Cook-McGowan, Karen Spangenberg (sound editors)	NBC
2002	24	"Day 2: 10:00 a.m. – 11:00 a.m."	William Dotson (supervising sound editor); Cathie Speakman (supervising dialogue/ADR editor); Pembrooke Andrews, Jeffrey R. Whitcher (sound editors)	Fox
2002	CSI: Crime Scene Investigation	"Fight Night"	Mace Matiosian (supervising sound/dialogue editor), David F. Van Slyke (supervising sound editor), Ruth Adelman (supervising ADR editor), Jivan Tahmizian (sound editor)	CBS
2002	The District	"Old Wounds"	Albert Ibbotson (supervising sound/dialogue/adr editor); Steffan Falesitch, Kirsten Reed (sound editors)	CBS
2002	NYPD Blue	"Below the Belt"	Jeff Rosen (supervising sound/adr editor); H. Jay Levine, Todd Niesen (sound editors)	ABC
2002	Third Watch	"Ladies Day"	Walter Newman (supervising sound editor); Constance A. Kazmer (supervising dialogue editor); John F. Reynolds (supervising ADR editor/ADR editor); Catherine Flynn, Denise Horta (dialogue editors)	NBC
2002	American Dreams	"Cold Snap"	Fred Judkins (supervising sound/ADR editor); Jane Boegel (supervising dialogue editor); Barbara J. Boguski, Russell DeWolf, Sonya Henry, Daniel Tripoli (sound editors)	NBC
2002	The West Wing	"Game On"	Walter Newman (supervising sound editor); Catherine Flynn (supervising dialogue editor); Thomas A. Harris (supervising adr editor); Denise Horta, Constance A. Kazmer, Karen Spangenberg (sound editors)	NBC
2003	Six Feet Under	"I'm Sorry, I'm Lost"	Bob Newlan (supervising sound editor); Jane Boegel, Sonya Henry, Patrick Hogan, Jason Lezama, Helen Luttrell (dialogue/ADR editors)	HBO
2003	The District	"Sacrifices"	Albert Ibbotson (supervising sound/dialogue editor); Jim Yant (supervising ADR editor); Thomas Kearney, Kirsten Reed (dialogue/ADR editors)	CBS
2003	Without a Trace	"Trip Box"	Cormac Funge (supervising sound editor), Jay Keiser (supervising ADR editor), Paul Longstaffe (supervising dialogue editor)	CBS
2003	ER	"Kisangani"	Walter Newman (supervising sound editor); Darleen Stoker (supervising dialogue editor); Thomas A. Harris (supervising ADR editor); Richard Corwin, Catherine Flynn (dialogue/ADR editors)	NBC
2003	American Dreams	"City on Fire"	Fred Judkins (supervising sound/ADR editor); Jane Boegel (supervising dialogue editor); David Beadle, Barbara J. Boguski, John Green, Daniel Tripoli (dialogue/ADR editors)	NBC
2003	Third Watch	"Snow Blind"	Walter Newman (supervising sound editor); Constance A. Kazmer (supervising dialogue editor); John F. Reynolds (supervising ADR editor); Virginia Cook-McGowan, Catherine Flynn, Eric Hertsguaard (dialogue/ADR editors)	NBC
2003	The West Wing	"Twenty Five"	Walter Newman (supervising sound editor); Catherine Flynn (supervising dialogue editor); Thomas A. Harris (supervising ADR editor); Jennifer Mertens (ADR editor); Eric Hertsguaard, Karen Spangenberg (dialogue editors)	NBC
2003	Carnivàle	"Tipton"	Mace Matiosian (supervising sound editor), Ruth Adelman (supervising ADR editor), Jivan Tahmizian (dialogue editor), Jay Keiser (ADR editor)	HBO

Best Sound Editing in Television Short Form – Dialogue & ADR

Year	Program	Episode(s)	Nominees	Network
2004	Lost	"Pilot, Part 1"	Thomas DeGorter, Trevor Jolly (supervising sound editors); Christopher B. Reeves (supervising dialogue editor); Troy Allen (dialogue editor/ADR editor); Gabrielle Gilbert Reeves (dialogue editor)	ABC
2004	CSI: Crime Scene Investigation	"Down the Drain"	Mace Matiosian (supervising sound editor); David F. Van Slyke (sound designer); Ruth Adelman (supervising ADR editor/ADR editor); Todd Niesen, Yuri Reese, Jivan Tahmizian (dialogue editors)	CBS
2004	CSI: NY	"Outside Man"	George Haddad (supervising sound editor), David Barbee (sound designer), Edmund J. Lachmann (supervising dialogue editor), Tim Kimmel (supervising ADR editor)	CBS
2004	Cold Case	"Mind Hunters"	Cindy Rabideau (supervising sound editor); Robert Guastini (supervising dialogue editor/dialogue editor); Mike Marchain (supervising ADR editor); Mark Cleary, Kevin McCullough (dialogue editors); Susan Cahill (adr editor)	CBS
2004	Gilmore Girls	"You Jump, I Jump, Jack"	Eileen Horta (supervising sound/dialogue/ADR editor); David Beadle, Sonya Henry, Patrick Hogan (dialogue/ADR editor)	The WB
2004	Law & Order	"Gunplay"	Jeffrey Kaplan (supervising sound/adr editor), Michael Trifman (supervising dialogue editor)	NBC
2004	Sex and the City	"An American Girl In Paris (Part Deux)"	Louis Bertini (supervising sound/ADR editor), Anthony J. Ciccolini III (supervising sound editor), Pam DeMetruis-Thomas (supervising dialogue editor)	HBO
2004	Six Feet Under	"Falling Into Place"	Bob Newlan (supervising sound/dialogue/ADR editor); Jane Boegel, Mark Kamps (dialogue/ADR editors)	HBO

Best Sound Editing in Television: Short Form – Dialogue and Automated Dialogue Replacement

Year	Program	Episode(s)	Nominees	Network
2005	House	"Autopsy"	Barbara Issak (supervising sound editor); Brad North, Jackie Rodman (dialogue/ADR editors)	Fox
2005	Alias	"Before the Flood"	Thomas DeGorter (supervising sound editor), Christopher B. Reeves (supervising dialogue editor), Jay Keiser (dialogue/ADR editor)	ABC
2005	Commander in Chief	"Pilot"	Fred Judkins, Marla McGuire (supervising sound editors); David Beadle, Thomas Kearney, Ray Spiess (dialogue editors); Vic Radulich (ADR editor)	ABC
2005	Lost	"The Other 48 Days"	Thomas DeGorter, Trevor Jolly (supervising sound editors); Maciek Malish (supervising dialogue editor); Jay Keiser (supervising ADR editor)	ABC
2005	CSI: Miami	"Three-Way"	Ann Hadsell (supervising sound/adr editor), Todd Niesen (supervising dialogue editor), Ruth Adelman (dialogue/ADR editor)	CBS
2005	ER	"Two Ships"	Walter Newman (supervising sound editor), Darleen Stoker (supervising dialogue editor), Thomas A. Harris (supervising ADR editor), Bruce M. Honda (dialogue/ADR editor)	NBC
2005	The West Wing	"The Ticket"	Thomas A. Harris, Walter Newman (supervising sound editor); Catherine Flynn (supervising dialogue editor); Virginia Cook-McGowan, Steffan Falesitch (dialogue/adr editors)	NBC
2005	Everybody Hates Chris	"Everybody Hates Basketball"	Wilson Dyer (supervising sound editor), Marti D. Humphrey (dialogue/ADR editor)	UPN
2006	CSI: Miami	"Rio"	Tim Kimmel (supervising sound editor), Todd Niesen (supervising dialogue editor), Ruth Adelman (supervising ADR editor)	CBS
2006	ER	"Jigsaw"	Walter Newman (supervising sound editor), Darleen Stoker (supervising dialogue editor), Bob Redpath (supervising ADR editor)	NBC
2006	Heroes	"Genesis"	Stephen Grubbs, Joe Melody (supervising sound editors); Anton Holden (supervising dialogue editor); J. Michael Hooser (supervising ADR editor); Mark Steele, Burton Weinstein (dialogue/ADR editor)	NBC
2006	Law & Order	"Profiteer"	Jeffrey Kaplan (supervising sound editor); Michael Trifman (supervising dialogue editor); Michael Jacobi (supervising ADR editor); Tiffany S. Griffith, Jeff Kushner (dialogue/ADR editor)	NBC
2006	CSI: Crime Scene Investigation	"Fannysmackin'"	Ruth Adelman, Mace Matiosian (supervising sound editors); Jivan Tahmizian (dialogue editor)	CBS
2006	Lost	"Further Instructions"	Thomas DeGorter (supervising sound editors), Jay Keiser (supervising ADR editor), Maciek Malish (dialogue/ADR editor)	ABC
2006	The Nine	"Pilot"	Peter Austin (supervising sound editor); Virginia Cook-McGowan, David M. Cowan, Steffan Falesitch, Catherine Flynn, Mitch Gettleman, Bruce M. Honda, Gabrielle Gilbert Reeves (dialogue/ADR editors)	ABC
2006	The Wire	"Misgivings"	Will Ralston (supervising sound editor), Igor Nikolic (supervising dialogue editor), Matthew Haasch (dialogue editor)	HBO
2007	House	"Human Error"	Brad North (supervising sound editor); Tiffany S. Griffith, Jackie Rodman (dialogue editors); Kirk Herzbrun, Alex Parker (assistant sound editors)	Fox
2007	CSI: Crime Scene Investigation	"Cockroaches"	Mace Matiosian (supervising sound editor), Jivan Tahmizian (supervising dialogue editor), Ruth Adelman (supervising ADR editor)	CBS
2007	ER	"Murmers of the Heart"	Walter Newman (supervising sound editor), Darleen Stoker (supervising dialogue editor/ADR editor), Bob Redpath (supervising ADR editor), Bruce M. Honda (dialogue editor)	NBC
2007	Law & Order: Criminal Intent	"Offense"	Jeff Rosen (supervising sound/adr editor); Michael Jacobi (supervising ADR editor); Sonya Henry (dialogue editor); Kirk Herzbrun, Alex Parker (assistant sound editors)	NBC
2007	Law & Order: Special Victims Unit	"Paternity"	Jeffrey Kaplan (supervising sound editor); Michael Jacobi (supervising ADR editor); Jeff Kushner (dialogue editor); Kirk Herzbrun, Alex Parker (assistant sound editors)	NBC
2007	Lost	"Greatest Hits"	Thomas DeGorter (supervising sound editor), Maciek Malish (supervising dialogue editor), Jay Keiser (supervising ADR editor), Scott Weber (sound effects editor)	ABC
2007	Mad Men	"Smoke Gets in Your Eyes"	Jason George (supervising sound editor); Jed M. Dodge (supervising dialogue editor); Dale Chaloukian, Charlie Kolander (dialogue editors); Julie Altus (ADR editor)	AMC

Best Sound Editing – Short Form Dialogue and ADR in Television

Year	Program	Episode(s)	Nominees	Network
2008	Lost	"Confirmed Dead"	Thomas DeGorter (supervising sound editor), Maciek Malish (supervising dialogue editor), Jay Keiser (supervising ADR editor)	ABC
2008	CSI: Crime Scene Investigation	"Bull"	Mace Matiosian (supervising sound/dialogue editor), Ruth Adelman (supervising ADR editor), Jivan Tahmizian (dialogue editor)	CBS
2008	CSI: NY	"Hostage"	George Haddad (supervising sound/dialogue editor); Ruth Adelman, Edmund J. Lachmann (sound editors)	CBS
2008	Californication	"The Raw and the Cooked"	Mitchell Gettleman (supervising sound/adr editor); Peter Austin, Jerry Edemann, Lou Thomas (sound editors)	Showtime
2008	The Tudors	"Destiny and Fortune"	Jane Tattersall (supervising sound editor), David McCallum (supervising dialogue editor), Dale Sheldrake (supervising ADR editor)	Showtime
2008	Fringe	"Safe"	Thomas A. Harris (supervising sound/ADR editor); Jay Keiser, Christopher B. Reeves, Gabrielle Gilbert Reeves (sound editors)	Fox
2008	Mad Men	"The Jet Set"	Jason George (supervising sound editor), Jed M. Dodge (supervising dialogue editor), Dale Chaloukian (dialogue editor), Julie Altus (adr editor)	AMC
2008	True Blood	"The Fourth Man in the Fire"	John Benson (supervising sound/dialogue/ADR editor); Jason Krane, Jason Lezama, Steven Stuhr (sound editors)	HBO
2009	True Blood	"Beyond Here Lies Nothin'"	John Benson (supervising sound/dialogue/adr editor); Christian Buenaventura, Jason Krane (sound editors)	HBO
2009	CSI: Crime Scene Investigation	"Mascara"	Mace Matiosian (supervising sound/dialogue editor), Ruth Adelman (supervising adr editor), Jivan Tahmizian (supervising dialogue editor)	CBS
2009	CSI: Miami	"Hostage"	Tim Kimmel (supervising sound editor), Todd Niesen (supervising dialogue editor), Ruth Adelman (supervising adr editor)	CBS
2009	CSI: NY	"Manhattanhenge"	Mark Relyea (supervising sound/dialogue editor), Edmund J. Lachmann (dialogue editor), Ruth Adelman (adr editor)	CBS
2009	ER	"I Feel Good"	Walter Newman (supervising sound editor), Darleen Stoker (supervising dialogue editor), Bob Redpath (supervising ADR editor), Bruce M. Honda (dialogue editor)	NBC
2009	Lost	"The Little Prince"	Thomas DeGorter (supervising sound editor), Maciek Malish (dialogue editor), Jay Keiser (ADR editor)	ABC
2009	FlashForward	"Riptide"	Thomas A. Harris (supervising sound/ADR editor), Christopher B. Reeves (supervising dialogue editor), Gabrielle Gilbert Reeves (dialogue editor), Jay Keiser (ADR editor)	ABC
2009	Fringe	"Unleashed"	Thomas A. Harris (supervising sound/ADR editor), Christopher B. Reeves (supervising dialogue editor), Gabrielle Gilbert Reeves (dialogue editor), Jay Keiser (ADR editor)	Fox

=== 2010s ===
Year	Program	Episode(s)	Nominees	Network
2010	The Walking Dead	"Guts"	Walter Newman (supervising sound editor); Darleen Stoker (supervising dialogue editor); Lou Thomas (supervising ADR editor); Bruce M. Honda (dialogue editor); Peter Austin, Karyn Foster, Skip Schoolnik (ADR editors)	AMC
2010	The Glades	"A Perfect Storm"	Tim Kimmel (supervising sound editor), Jivan Tahmizian (supervising dialogue editor), Todd Niesen (dialogue editor)	A&E
2010	Mad Men	"The Summer Man"	Jason George (supervising sound editor)	A&E
2010	Human Target	"Ilsa Pucci"	Peter Austin (supervising sound/ADR editor), Matthew E. Taylor (supervising dialogue editor), Lou Thomas (dialogue editor), Tim Farrell (ADR editor)	Fox
2010	The Mentalist	"The Red Ponies"	Thierry J. Couturier (supervising sound/ADR editor), David M. Cowan (supervising dialogue editor)	CBS
2010	Smallville	"Salvation"	Michael E. Lawshe (supervising sound editor, adr editor), Jessica Goodwin (supervising dialogue editor), Norval D. Crutcher III (supervising ADR editor/dialogue editor)	The CW
2010	True Blood	"9 Crimes"	John Benson (supervising sound/dialogue/ADR editor); Jason Krane (dialogue/ADR editor); David Beadle, Christian Buenaventura, Patrick Hogan, Steven Stuhr (dialogue editors)	HBO
2010	The Tudors	"Sixth and the Final Wife"	Jane Tattersall (supervising sound editor), Dale Sheldrake (supervising dialogue/ADR editor), David McCallum (dialogue editor)	Showtime
2011	Game of Thrones	"Cripples, Bastards, and Broken Things"	Stefan Henrix (supervising sound editor), Peter Blayney (supervising dialogue editor), Tim Hands (supervising ADR editor), Iain Eyre (ADR editor), Aza Hand (ADR recordist)	HBO
2011	The Big C	"A Little Death"	Robert Getty (supervising sound editor), Chato Hill (supervising dialogue editor)	Showtime
2011	Hell on Wheels	"Bread and Circuses"	John Kincade (supervising sound editor), Todd Niesen (dialogue editor), Shannon Beament (ADR editor)	AMC
2011	The Walking Dead	"Save the Last One"	Jerry Ross (supervising sound editor), Lou Thomas (supervising dialogue/ADR editor), Steffan Falesitch (dialogue editor)	AMC
2011	Leverage	"The Van Gogh Job"	Kenneth L. Johnson (supervising sound editor), David Grant (supervising dialogue editor)	TNT
2011	Person of Interest	"Witness"	Thomas DeGorter, Matt Sawelson (supervising sound editors); Maciek Malish (supervising dialogue editor); H. Jay Levine (ADR editor)	CBS
2011	Smallville	"Dominion"	Michael E. Lawshe (supervising sound editor), Jessica Goodwin (supervising dialogue editor/dialogue editor), Norval D. Crutcher III (dialogue editor)	The CW
2011	Sons of Anarchy	"To Be, Act 2"	Erich Gann (supervising sound editor), Joy Ealy (supervising dialogue editor)	FX
2012	The Newsroom	"Amen"	Mark Relyea (supervising sound/ADR editor), Robert Guastini (dialogue editor), Ruth Adelman (ADR editor)	HBO
2012	Boss	"Backflash"	Kurt Nicholas Forshager (supervising sound editor), Tim Boggs (supervising ADR editor), Kathryn Madsen (ADR editor), Jane Boegel (sound editor)	Starz
2012	Game of Thrones	"Blackwater"	Peter Brown (supervising sound editor); Kira Roessler (supervising dialogue/ADR editor); Tim Hands, Vanessa Lapato (sound editors)	HBO
2012	True Blood	"We'll Meet Again"	John Benson (supervising sound editor); Jason Krane (dialogue/ADR editor); Christian Buenaventura, Steven Stuhr (dialogue editors); Judah Getz (ADR mixer)	HBO
2012	Homeland	"The Smile"	Craig A. Dellinger (supervising sound editor); Pembrooke Andrews, Devin Joseph, Nello Torri (sound editors)	Showtime
2012	Saving Hope	"Pilot"	Sue Conley (supervising sound/dialogue/ADR editor); Paul Germann, Barry Gilmore (dialogue/ADR editors)	NBC
2012	The Walking Dead	"Better Angels"	Jerry Ross (supervising sound editor), Lou Thomas (supervising dialogue/ADR editor)	AMC
2012	World Without End	"King"	Jane Tattersall (supervising sound editor), David McCallum (supervising dialogue editor), Dale Sheldrake (supervising ADR editor), Martin Gwynn Jones (sound editor)	Reelz Channel
2013	Game of Thrones	"The Rains of Castamere"	Tim Kimmel (supervising sound editor); Jed M. Dodge (supervising dialogue editor); Tim Hands (supervising ADR editor); Ruth Adelman, Martin Mahon (ADR editors)	HBO
2013	American Horror Story: Coven	"Bitchcraft"	Gary Megregian (supervising sound/dialogue editor), Steven Stuhr (dialogue editor)	FX
2013	Boardwalk Empire	"Havre de Grace"	Fred Rosenberg (supervising sound/ADR editor); Jeffrey Stern (supervising dialogue editor, dialogue editor); Bill Orrico, Roland Vajs (dialogue editors)	HBO
2013	Family Tree	"Civil War"	Hamilton Sterling (supervising sound/dialogue editor), Alison Fisher (supervising adr editor)	HBO
2013	The Newsroom	"Unintended Consequences"	Mark Relyea (supervising sound/ADR editor), Charlie Kolander (dialogue editor), Ruth Adelman (ADR editor)	HBO
2013	Breaking Bad	"To'hajiilee"	Kurt Nicholas Forshager (supervising sound/dialogue editor), Kathryn Madsen (supervising adr editor), Jane Boegel (dialogue editor)	AMC
2013	The Walking Dead	"Too Far Gone"	Jerry Ross (supervising sound editor, adr editor); Lou Thomas (supervising dialogue/ADR editor); Tim Farrell, Clayton Weber (dialogue editors)	AMC
2013	House of Lies	"Damonschildren.org"	Pembrooke Andrews (supervising sound/dialogue/ADR editor); Craig A. Dellinger, Larry Goeb, Sean Massey (dialogue editors); Greg Stacy (sound effects editor); Mike Pipgras, Randy Singer (Foley editors); Robin Harlan, Sarah Monat (Foley artists)	Showtime
2014	The Newsroom	"Oh Shenandoah"	Mark Relyea (supervising dialogue/ADR editor); Julie Altus, Edmund J. Lachmann (dialogue/ADR editors)	HBO
2014	Homeland	"Redux"	Craig A. Dellinger (supervising sound editor); Nello Torri, Jon Wakeham (dialogue/ADR editors)	Showtime
2014	Penny Dreadful	"Séance"	Jane Tattersall (supervising sound editor), David McCallum (supervising dialogue/ADR editor), Dale Sheldrake (supervising ADR editor)	Showtime
2014	Houdini	"Part 2"	Michael J. Benavente (supervising sound/dialogue/ADR editor); David Beadle, Lance Wiseman (dialogue/adr editor)	History
2014	The Strain	"The Box"	Nelson Ferreira (supervising sound/dialogue/ADR editor), Jill Purdy (supervising dialogue editor)	FX
2014	True Blood	"Jesus Gonna Be Here"	John Benson (supervising sound editor), Jason Krane (dialogue/adr editor)	HBO
2014	Game of Thrones	"The Children"	Tim Kimmel (supervising sound editor), Jed M. Dodge (supervising dialogue editor), Tim Hands (supervising ADR editor)	HBO
2014	True Detective	"Who Goes There"	Eliza Paley (supervising sound/dialogue/ADR editor)	HBO
2015	Game of Thrones	"Hardhome"	Tim Kimmel (supervising sound editor), Paul Bercovitch (supervising dialogue editor), Tim Hands (supervising ADR editor)	HBO
2015	The 100	"Survival of the Fittest"	Norval D. Crutcher III (supervising sound/ADR editor), Benjamin Beardwood (dialogue editor)	The CW
2015	American Horror Story: Hotel	"Checking In"	Gary Megregian (supervising sound editor), Steven Stuhr (supervising dialogue editor), Jason Krane (dialogue editor)	FX
2015	Blindspot	"Evil Handmade Instrument "	Mark Relyea (supervising sound/ADR editor); Julie Altus, Edmund J. Lachmann (dialogue/adr editors)	NBC
2015	Daredevil	"Into the Ring"	Lauren Stephens (supervising sound editor), Christian Buenaventura (dialogue/ADR editor)	Netflix
2015	Homeland	"The Tradition of Hospitality"	Craig A. Dellinger (supervising sound editor), Jon Wakeham (supervising dialogue editor)	Showtime
2015	Vikings	"Breaking Point"	Jane Tattersall (supervising sound editor), David McCallum (supervising dialogue editor), Dale Sheldrake (supervising ADR editor)	History
2015	The Walking Dead	"Spend"	Jerry Ross, Lou Thomas (supervising sound editors); Tim Farrell (dialogue editor)	AMC
2016	Penny Dreadful	"Ebb Tide"	Jane Tattersall (supervising sound editor); David McCallum (supervising dialogue editor); Elma Bello (dialogue editor); Paul Conway, Dale Sheldrake (ADR editors)	Showtime
2016	Agents of S.H.I.E.L.D.	"Deals with Our Devils"	Daniel Colman (supervising sound editor), Stefani Feldman (dialogue editor), Sara Bencivenga (ADR editor)	ABC
2016	Game of Thrones	"Battle of the Bastards"	Tim Kimmel (supervising sound editor), Paul Bercovitch (supervising dialogue editor), Tim Hands (supervising ADR editor)	HBO
2016	Westworld	"Trace Decay"	Thomas DeGorter (supervising sound editor), Matt Sawelson (supervising ADR editor), Brian Armstrong (dialogue editor), Fred Paragano (dialogue editor)	HBO
2016	The Shannara Chronicles	"Safehold"	Norval D. Crutcher III (supervising sound editor), Michael E. Lawshe (supervising ADR editor), Karyn Foster (dialogue editor)	MTV
2016	Shooter	"Overwatch"	Mark Relyea (supervising sound editor), Robert Guastini (dialogue editor), Julie Altus (ADR editor)	USA
2016	The Walking Dead	"Hearts Still Beating"	Tim Farrell, Jerry Ross (supervising sound editors); Lou Thomas (supervising sound editor/dialogue editor)	AMC

Outstanding Achievement in Sound Editing – Dialogue and ADR for Episodic Short Form Broadcast Media

Year	Program	Episode(s)	Nominees	Network
2017	Game of Thrones	"The Spoils of War"	Tim Kimmel (supervising sound editor), Paul Bercovitch (supervising dialogue editor), Tim Hands (supervising ADR editor)	HBO
2017	Orange Is the New Black	"Storm-y Weather"	John Kincade (supervising sound editor), Paul Stanley (ADR supervisor), Todd Niesen (dialogue editor)	Netflix
2017	Stranger Things	"Chapter Eight: The Mind Flayer"	Brad North (supervising sound editor/ADR editor), Tiffany S. Griffith (dialogue editor)	Netflix
2017	The Crown	"Paterfamilias"	Lee Walpole (supervising sound editor), Kallis Shamaris (supervising ADR editor), Iain Eyre (dialogue editor)	Netflix
2017	Feud: Bette and Joan	"And the Winner Is... (The Oscars of 1963)"	Gary Megregian (supervising sound editor), Lance Wiseman (dialogue editor)	FX
2017	Halt and Catch Fire	"So It Goes"	Susan Cahill (supervising sound editor), Sara Bencivenga (supervising ADR editor), Jane Boegel (dialogue editor)	AMC
2017	The Handmaid's Tale	"Offred"	David McCallum (supervising sound/dialogue editor), Jane Tattersall (supervising sound editor), Dale Sheldrake (supervising ADR editor), Brent Pickett (dialogue editor)	Hulu
2017	Vikings	"Homeland"	Jane Tattersall (supervising sound editor), David McCallum (supervising dialogue editor), Dale Sheldrake (supervising ADR editor), Claire Dobson (dialogue editor)	History
2018	The Americans	"Harvest"	Neil Cedar, Ken Hahn (supervising sound editors); Gerald Donlan (dialogue editor), John Bowen (ADR editor)	FX
2018	Better Call Saul	"Talk"	Kurt Nicholas Forshager (supervising sound editor), Kathryn Madsen (supervising adr editor), Jane Boegel (dialogue editor)	AMC
2018	The Handmaid's Tale	"Holly"	Jane Tattersall (supervising sound editor), David McCallum (supervising dialogue editor), Krystin Hunter (dialogue editor)	Hulu
2018	Jessica Jones	"AKA Three Lives and Counting"	Bob Newlan (supervising sound editor); Christian Buenaventura, Lance Wiseman (dialogue editors)	Netflix
2018	Atlanta	"Teddy Perkins"	Trevor Gates (supervising sound editor), Jason Dotts (dialogue editor)	FX
2018	Tom Clancy's Jack Ryan	"The Wolf"	Jon Wakeham (supervising sound editor); Micah Loken, Tim Tuchrello (dialogue editors); Benjamin L. Cook (ADR editor)	Amazon
2018	Vikings	"Moments of Vision"	Jane Tattersall (supervising sound editor), David McCallum (supervising dialogue editor), Dale Sheldrake (supervising ADR editor), Claire Dobson (dialogue editor)	History
2018	The X-Files	"This"	Thierry J. Couturier (supervising sound/ADR editor), Xiao'ou Olivia Zhang (dialogue/adr editor)	Fox
2019	Modern Love	"Take Me as I Am, Whoever I Am"	Lewis Goldstein (supervising sound editor), Gina Alfano (supervising adr editor), Alfred DeGrand (dialogue editor)	Amazon
2019	Big Little Lies	"What Have We Done"	Paul Lucien Col, Linda Forsén (supervising sound editors); Alex Horlick (dialogue editor); Natalie Fleurant (ADR editor)	HBO
2019	Castle Rock	"Restore Hope"	Tim Kimmel (supervising sound editor), Ryan Briley (dialogue editor)	Hulu
2019	Lost in Space	"Unknown"	Branden Spencer (supervising sound editor); Michael Hertlein, Tim Tuchrello (dialogue editors)	Netflix
2019	The Mandalorian	"Chapter 1: The Mandalorian"	David Acord, Matthew Wood (supervising sound editors); Steve Slanec, James Spencer (dialogue editors); Richard Quinn (adr editor)	Disney+
2019	The Terror: Infamy	"The Weak are Meat"	Gord Hillier (supervising sound editor/dialogue editor); Aaron Olson, Gordon Sproule (ADR editors)	AMC
2019	Vikings	"New Beginnings"	Jane Tattersall (supervising sound editor), David McCallum (supervising dialogue editor), Dale Sheldrake (supervising ADR editor), Claire Dobson (dialogue editor)	History
2019	Whiskey Cavalier	"Czech Mate"	Brent Findley (supervising sound editor), Michael Jesmer (dialogue/ADR editor)	ABC

=== 2020s ===
Year	Program	Episode(s)	Nominees	Network
2020	The Mandalorian	"Chapter 13: The Jedi"	David Acord, Matthew Wood (supervising sound editors); Richard Quinn (dialogue editor); James Spencer (ADR editor)	Disney+
2020	Agents of S.H.I.E.L.D.	"What We're Fighting For"	Daniel Colman (supervising sound editor), Stefani Feldman (supervising dialogue editor), Fernanda Domene (dialogue editor)	ABC
2020	Babylon Berlin	"Episode 28"	Frank Kruse (supervising sound editor), Alexander Buck (supervising dialogue editor), Benjamin Hörbe (supervising ADR editor)	Netflix
2020	Locke & Key	"Crown of Shadows"	Dustin Harris (supervising sound editor), Jill Purdy (dialogue editor)	Netflix
2020	The Umbrella Academy	"The End of Something"	John Benson (supervising sound editor), Jason Krane (dialogue editor)	Netflix
2020	The Flight Attendant	"Other People’s Houses"	Mike Marchain (supervising sound editor); Julie Altus, Doug Mountain, Vince Tennant (dialogue editors)	HBO Max
2020	The Right Stuff	"Flight"	Walter Newman (supervising sound editor), Brian Armstrong (supervising ADR editor), Darleen Stoker (dialogue editor)	Disney+
2020	Snowpiercer	"Trouble Comes Sideways"	Sandra Portman (supervising sound editor), Eric Mouawad (dialogue/ADR editor), Francisco Frial (ADR editor)	TNT

== Programs with multiple awards ==
4 awards

- Game of Thrones (HBO)

2 awards

- ER (NBC)
- House (Fox)
- Lost (ABC)
- The Newsroom (HBO)
- Six Feet Under (HBO)

== Programs with multiple nominations ==
9 nominations

- ER (NBC)

7 nominations

- Game of Thrones (HBO)

6 nominations

- CSI: Crime Scene Investigation (CBS)
- Lost (ABC)
- The Walking Dead (AMC)

5 nominations

- True Blood (HBO)
- The West Wing (NBC)

4 nominations

- NYPD Blue (ABC)
- Third Watch (NBC)
- Vikings (History)

3 nominations

- CSI: Miami (CBS)
- CSI: NY (CBS)
- Homeland (Showtime)
- Law & Order (NBC)
- Mad Men (AMC)
- The Newsroom (HBO)
- Six Feet Under (HBO)
- The X-Files (Fox)

2 nominations

- 24 (Fox)
- Agents of S.H.I.E.L.D. (ABC)
- Alias (ABC)
- American Dreams (NBC)
- American Horror Story (FX)
- Buffy the Vampire Slayer (The WB)
- The District (CBS)
- Fringe (Fox)
- The Handmaid's Tale (Hulu)
- House (Fox)
- Law & Order: Special Victims Unit (NBC)
- The Mandalorian (Disney+)
- Penny Dreadful (Showtime)
- The Practice (ABC)
- Roar (Fox)
- Sex and the City (HBO)
- Smallville (The CW)
- The Tudors (Showtime)
- Xena: Warrior Princess (Syndicated)
