= Christopher B. Reeves =

Television supervising sound editor

- Born: December 20, 1958 (age 66)
- Occupation: Television supervising sound editor
- Spouse: Gabrielle Reeves

Christopher Bennett Reeves is a television supervising sound editor living in the Los Angeles area. He has been awarded two Emmy Awards for his work on The X-Files and has two (1992 and 2004) Golden Reel Awards from the MPSE. His wife, Gabrielle Reeves, is also a sound editor.
