= Golden Reel Award for Outstanding Achievement in Sound Editing – Sound Effects and Foley for Episodic Short Form Broadcast Media =

- Country: United States
- Presented by: Motion Picture Sound Editors
- Currently held by: David Acord, Matthew Wood, Benjamin A. Burtt, J.R. Grubbs, Richard Gould, Ronni Brown, Jana Vance – The Mandalorian (2020)

The Golden Reel Award for Outstanding Achievement in Sound Editing - Dialogue and ADR for Episodic Short Form Broadcast Media is an annual award given by the Motion Picture Sound Editors in the United States. It honors sound editors whose work has warranted merit in the field of television; in this case, their work in the field of sound effects and Foley work in short form broadcast media. The "short form" of the title refers to television episodes that have a runtime of less than one hour, though more than 35 minutes, as those episodes have their own category. It was first awarded in 1998, for episodes premiering the previous year, under the title Best Sound Editing - Television Episodic - Effects & Foley. The term "short form" was added to the category in 2005, though long form television had had its own category by then. The award has been given with its existing title since 2018.

== Winners and nominees ==
=== 1990s ===
Best Sound Editing - Television Episodic - Effects & Foley

Year	Program	Episode(s)	Nominees	Network
1997	The X-Files	"Tempus Fugit"	Thierry J. Couturier (supervising sound/Foley editor); Stuart Calderon, Christ Frandkin, Ira Leslie, Susan Welsh (sound effects editors)	Fox
1997	ER			NBC
1997	Fast Track			Showtime
1997	Gun			ABC
1997	Hercules: The Legendary Journeys		Takako Ishikawa (sound effects editor)	Syndication
1997	Millennium			Fox
1997	New York Undercover			Fox
1997	The Visitor	"Pilot"		Fox
1997	The Visitor	"Teufelsnacht (Devil Night)"		Fox
1998	ER	"Exodus"	Walter Newman (supervising sound editor); Rick Camara, Darren Wright (sound editors)	NBC
1998	Fantasy Island			ABC
1998	Hercules: The Legendary Journeys			Syndication
1998	Honey, I Shrunk the Kids: The TV Show			Syndication
1998	Soldier of Fortune, Inc.			Syndication
1998	Xena: Warrior Princess			Syndication
1998	JAG			CBS
1998	Millennium			Fox
1998	The Pretender			NBC
1998	Profiler			NBC
1999	ER	"The Storm (Part II)"	Walter Newman (supervising sound editor); Rick Camara, Rick Hromadka, Darren Wright (sound editors); Kenny Fewell, Lisa K. Wolf (assistant sound editor); James Bailey, Casey J. Crabtree (Foley artists); Dave Concors, Michael Jiron, Allen L. Stone (re-recording mixer); Al Gomez (Foley mixer/recordist)	NBC
1999	Dead Man's Gun	"A Just Reward"	Tony Gronick (supervising sound editor, sound editor), Rick Senechal (supervising Foley editor, sound editor)	Showtime
1999	Earth: Final Conflict	Deja Vu	Tom Bjelic, John Douglas Smith (supervising sound editors)	Syndication
1999	Farscape	"Premiere"	Walter Newman (supervising sound editor), Darleen Stoker (supervising dialogue editor), Thomas A. Harris (supervising ADR editor), Bruce M. Honda (ADR/dialogue editor)	Sci Fi Channel
1999	Nash Bridges	"Crosstalk"	Albert Ibbotson, Mark Mangino (supervising sound/Foley editors); Craig T. Rosevear, Charles Rychwalski, David F. Van Slyke (sound editors)	CBS
1999	The Pretender	"At the Hour of Our Death"	Thomas DeGorter (supervising sound editor); Christopher Briles, Andrew Ellerd, Bradley C. Katona, Gary Krause (sound effects editors)	NBC
1999	Third Watch	"Welcome to Camelot"	Walter Newman (supervising sound editor); Rick Camara, Rick Hromadka, Darren Wright, Kenneth Young (sound editors)	NBC
1999	The X-Files	"Agua Mala"	Thierry J. Couturier (supervising sound editor); Cecilia Perna (supervising Foley editor); Stuart Calderon, Michael Kimball, Ira Leslie, Peggy McAffee, George Nemzer, Susan Welsh (sound editors)	Fox

=== 2000s ===
Year	Program	Episode(s)	Nominees	Network
2000	The Fugitive	"Pilot"	Michael E. Lawshe (supervising sound editor); Rick Camara, Timothy A. Cleveland, David M. Horton, Otis Van Osten, David Werntz, Darren Wright (sound editors)	CBS
2000	Buffy the Vampire Slayer	"Fools for Love"	Cindy Rabideau (supervising sound editor); Mike Marchain (supervising Foley editor); Mark Cleary, Ray Spiess, Daniel Tripoli (sound editors)	The WB
2000	CSI: Crime Scene Investigation	"Pilot"	Mace Matiosian, David Rawlinson (supervising sound editors); David F. Van Slyke (sound editor)	CBS
2000	Nash Bridges	"End Game"	Albert Ibbotson, Mark L. Mangino (supervising sound editors); Jim Yant (supervising Foley editor); Craig T. Rosevear, Charles Rychwalski (sound editors); John Peccatiello (Foley editor)	CBS
2000	ER	"All in the Family"	Walter Newman (supervising sound editor); Rick Camara, Darren Wright (sound editors)	NBC
2000	The Others	"Eyes"	Mace Matiosian (supervising sound editor); Harry Cohen, Guy Tsujimoto, Eric Williams (sound editors)	NBC
2000	Third Watch	"Jimmy's Mountain"	Walter Newman (supervising sound editor); Rick Hromadka, David Werntz (sound editor)	NBC
2000	Seven Days	"Tracker"	Wilson Dyer (supervising sound/Foley editor); Kevin Fisher, Jay Keiser, Todd Niesen (sound editors)	UPN
2000	The Sopranos	"The Knight in White Satin Armor"	Anna MacKenzie (supervising sound editor); Rick Hinson, Mike Marchain (sound editors)	HBO

Best Sound Editing in Television - Effects & Foley, Episodic

Year	Program	Episode(s)	Nominees	Network
2001	CSI: Crime Scene Investigation	"$35K O.B.O."	Mace Matiosian (supervising sound/Foley editor); David F. Van Slyke (sound effects editor); Ruth Adelman, Jivan Tahmizian (Foley editors)	CBS
2001	Buffy the Vampire Slayer	"The Gift"	Cindy Rabideau (supervising sound/Foley editor); Mark Cleary, Robert Guastini, Ray Spiess (sound effects editors); Daniel Tripoli (Foley editor)	The WB
2001	The District	"Cop Hunt"	Albert Ibbotson (supervising sound/Foley editor); Bob Arons, Craig T. Rosevear (sound editors)	CBS
2001	ER	"The Crossing"	Walter Newman (supervising sound editor); Stuart Calderon, Rick Hromadka, David Werntz, Darren Wright (sound editors)	NBC
2001	Third Watch	"Honor"	Walter Newman (supervising sound editor); Rick Hromadka, David Werntz, Darren Wright (sound editors)	NBC
2001	UC: Undercover	"Pilot"	Mace Matiosian (supervising sound/Foley editor); Peter Austin (supervising sound editor); Rick Hinson, Craig Hunter, David Rawlinson, Guy Tsujimoto, H. Jay Levine (Foley editors)	NBC
2001	Smallville	"Pilot"	Michael E. Lawshe (supervising sound editor); Bob Redpath (supervising Foley editor); Stuart Calderon, Timothy A. Cleveland, Paul J. Diller, David M. Horton, Eric Cameron Hosmer, Adam Johnston, Otis Van Osten, Andrew Somers (sound effects editors)	The WB
2001	The X-Files	"Dæmonicus"	Harry Andronis (supervising sound/Foley editor); David John West (supervising sound editor); Anthony Torretto, Susan Welsh (sound effects editors); Debby Ruby-Winsberg, Jackson Schwartz (Foley editors)	Fox

Best Sound Editing in Television Episodic - Sound Effects & Foley

Year	Program	Episode(s)	Nominees	Network
2002	Third Watch	"Superheroes"	Walter Newman (supervising sound editor); Rick Hromadka, David Werntz (sound editors)	NBC
2002	CSI: Crime Scene Investigation	"Fight Night"	Mace Matiosian (supervising sound editor/sound designer), David F. Van Slyke (sound designer)	CBS
2002	ER	"Chaos Theory"	Walter Newman (supervising sound editor); Rick Hromadka, David Werntz, Darren Wright, Kenneth Young (sound editors)	NBC
2002	Fastlane	"Pilot"	Michael E. Lawshe (supervising sound editor); Kerry Malony (supervising Foley editor); Charles Bruce, Stuart Calderon, Timothy A. Cleveland, Paul J. Diller, Charles Bruce (sound effects editors)	Fox
2002	John Doe	"Pilot"	David Werntz (supervising sound editor, sound effects editor); Gregory M. Gerlich (supervising sound editor); Kerry Malony (supervising Foley editor); Timothy A. Cleveland, Paul J. Diller, Jayme S. Parker, Andrew Somers (sound effects editors)	Fox
2002	The X-Files	"The Truth (Part II)"	Harry Andronis, David John West (supervising sound editors); Anthony Torretto, Susan Welsh (sound effects editors); Debby Ruby-Winsberg, Jackson Schwartz (Foley editors)	Fox
2002	Smallville	"Tempest"	Michael E. Lawshe (supervising sound editor); Kerry Malony (supervising Foley editor); Stuart Calderon, Timothy A. Cleveland, Paul J. Diller (sound effects editors)	The WB
2002	Witchblade	"Ubique"	Steve Foster, Kevin Howard (supervising sound editors); John Sievert (supervising Foley editor); Mark Beck, Jason MacNeill (sound effects editors); Steve Copley, Paul Shubat (Foley editors)	TNT
2003	CSI: Crime Scene Investigation	"Grissom Versus the Volcano"	Mace Matiosian (supervising sound editor), David F. Van Slyke (sound designer)	CBS
2003	Alias	"The Telling"	Thomas DeGorter (supervising sound editor), Kerri Wilson (supervising Foley editor), Mark Allen (sound effects editor)	ABC
2003	Carnivàle	"Milfay"	William H. Angarola, Mace Matiosian (supervising sound editors); Edmond J. Coblentz Jr., Bradley C. Katona, Matt Sawelson (sound effects editors)	HBO
2003	CSI: Miami	"Grand Prix"	Matt Sawelson (supervising sound editor); Ruth Adelman (supervising Foley editor); Peter Bergren, Bradley C. Katona	CBS
2003	Without a Trace	"Trip Box"	Cormac Funge (supervising sound editor); David Baldwin, Peter Bergren, Edmond J. Coblentz Jr. (sound editors)	CBS
2003	ER	"When Night Meets Day"	Walter Newman (supervising sound editor); Amber Funk (supervising Foley editor); Rick Hromadka, David Werntz, Darren Wright, Kenneth Young (sound editors)	NBC
2003	Third Watch	"The Price Of Nobility"	Walter Newman (supervising sound editor); John F. Reynolds (supervising Foley editor); Rick Hromadka, David Werntz, Darren Wright, Kenneth Young (sound editors)	NBC
2003	Smallville	"Exile"	Gregory M. Gerlich, Michael E. Lawshe (supervising sound editors); Stuart Calderon, Timothy A. Cleveland, Benjamin L. Cook, Paul J. Diller (sound editors)	The WB

Best Sound Editing in Television Short Form - Sound Effects & Foley

Year	Program	Episode(s)	Nominees	Network
2004	Lost	"Pilot, Part 1"	Thomas DeGorter, Trevor Jolly (supervising sound editors); Marc Glassman, Paul Menichini, Roland N. Thai (sound effects editors)	ABC
2004	CSI: Crime Scene Investigation	"Down the Drain"	Mace Matiosian (supervising sound editor), David F. Van Slyke (sound designer)	CBS
2004	CSI: Miami	"Lost Son"	Ann Hadsell (supervising sound editor); Bradley C. Katona, William Smith (sound effects editors)	CBS
2004	CSI: NY	"Officer Blue"	George Haddad (supervising sound/Foley editor), David Barbee (sound designer)	CBS
2004	Alias	"Resurrection"	Thomas DeGorter (supervising sound editor), Mark Allen (sound editor)	ABC
2004	House	"Paternity"	Barbara Issak (supervising sound editor), Craig T. Rosevear (supervising Foley editor), Brad North (sound effects editor)	Fox
2004	LAX	"Pilot"	Richard Corwin, Harry Woolway (supervising sound editors); Craig T. Rosevear (supervising Foley editor); Bradley Clouse, Kirk Herzbrun, Alex Parker (assistant sound editors); Michael Lyle, Paul Stevenson (Foley artists); Matthew J. Mondrick (Foley mixer)	NBC
2004	Smallville	"Scare"	Gregory M. Gerlich (supervising sound editor); Michael E. Lawshe (sound designer); Stuart Calderon, Timothy A. Cleveland, Paul J. Diller, Eric Erickson (sound effects editors)	The WB
2005	ER	"Two Ships"	Walter Newman (supervising sound editor); Rick Hromadka, Darren Wright, Kenneth Young (sound editors); Casey J. Crabtree, Michael Crabtree (Foley artists)	NBC
2005	CSI: Crime Scene Investigation	"A Bullet Runs Through It, Part 1"	Mace Matiosian (supervising sound editor); William Smith (sound/Foley editor); Mark Allen, David F. Van Slyke (sound editors); Shane Bruce, Zane D. Bruce, Jeff Gunn, Joseph T. Sabella (Foley artists)	CBS
2005	CSI: Miami	"Urban Hellraisers"	Ann Hadsell (supervising sound editor); Bradley C. Katona (sound designer); Shane Bruce, Zane D. Bruce, Joseph T. Sabella (Foley artists)	CBS
2005	CSI: NY	"Jamalot"	George Haddad (supervising sound/Foley editor); David Barbee (supervising sound editor); Lisle Engle (sound editor); Shane Bruce, Zane D. Bruce, Jeff Gunn, Joseph T. Sabella (Foley artists)	CBS
2005	Empire	"Pilot"	Bob Newlan (supervising sound editor), Stuart Martin (sound designer), Brian Thomas Nist (sound editor), Dale W. Perry (Foley artist)	ABC
2005	Smallville	"Commencement"	Michael E. Lawshe (supervising sound editor); Stuart Calderon, Timothy A. Cleveland, Paul J. Diller, Eric Erickson, Adam Johnston, Marc Meyer, Jason Oliver, David Werntz (sound editors); Casey J. Crabtree, Michael Crabtree (Foley artists)	The WB
2005	Supernatural	"Pilot"	Michael E. Lawshe (supervising sound editor); Timothy A. Cleveland, Adam Johnston, Marc Meyer (sound editors/sound designers); Stuart Calderon (sound/Foley editor); Paul J. Diller, David Lynch, Brian Risner (sound editors) Casey J. Crabtree, Michael Crabtree (Foley artists)	The WB
2005	Third Watch	"Goodbye to Camelot"	John F. Reynolds (supervising sound/supervising Foley editor); Walter Newman (sound designer); Rick Hromadka, Adam Johnston, Darren Wright, Kenneth Young (sound editors); Casey J. Crabtree, Michael Crabtree (Foley artists)	NBC

Best Sound Editing in Sound Effects and Foley for Television - Short Form

Year	Program	Episode(s)	Nominees	Network
2006	Lost	"A Tale of Two Cities"	Thomas DeGorter (supervising sound editor); Paula Fairfield, Carla Murray (sound designers/sound effects editors); Cynthia Merrill, Doug Reed (Foley artists)	ABC
2006	Battlestar Galactica	"Exodus, Part 2"	Daniel Colman (supervising sound editor/Foley editor); Jack Levy (supervising sound editor); Doug Madick, Richard Partlow (Foley artists)	Sci Fi
2006	CSI: Miami	"Come As You Are"	Tim Kimmel (supervising sound editor); Bradley C. Katona (sound designer); William Smith (sound effects editor); Don Givens, James Wong Howe, Joseph T. Sabella (Foley editors); Zane D. Bruce (Foley artist)	CBS
2006	CSI: NY	"Charge of This Post"	George Haddad (supervising sound editor); David Barbee (sound designer); Zane D. Bruce, Joseph T. Sabella (Foley artists)	CBS
2006	Prison Break	"Disconnect"	Gregory M. Gerlich (supervising sound editor); Stuart Calderon, Williams Jacobs, Brian Risner, Dan Yale (sound effects editors); Jerry Edemann, Andy Kopetzky (Foley editors); Casey J. Crabtree, Michael Crabtree (Foley artists)	Fox
2006	Rescue Me	"Devil"	Eileen Horta (supervising sound editor); Mark Cleary (sound designer); Ashley Harvey, Kevin McCullough (sound editors); James Bailey, Damien Smith (Foley artists)	FX
2006	Smallville	"Zod"	Michael E. Lawshe (supervising sound editor); Timothy A. Cleveland, Paul J. Diller (sound designers); Eric Erickson, Marc Meyer (sound effects editors); Casey J. Crabtree, Michael Crabtree (Foley artists)	The CW
2006	Supernatural	"Salvation"	Michael E. Lawshe (supervising sound editor); Marc Meyer (sound designer); Jason Oliver (sound effects editor); Casey J. Crabtree, Michael Crabtree (Foley artists)	The CW

Best Sound Editing - Sound Effects and Foley for Short Form Television

Year	Program	Episode(s)	Nominees	Network
2007	Lost	"Left Behind"	Thomas DeGorter (supervising sound editor); Paula Fairfield, Carla Murray (sound designers); Joseph Schultz, Geordy Sincavage, Scott Weber (sound editors); Cynthia Merrill, Doug Reed (Foley artists)	ABC
2007	CSI: Crime Scene Investigation	"Cockroaches"	Mace Matiosian (supervising sound editor); David F. Van Slyke (sound designer); Chad J. Hughes (sound editor); Zane D. Bruce, Joseph T. Sabella (Foley artists)	CBS
2007	Bionic Woman	"Pilot"	Jack Levy, Paul Pirola (supervising sound editors); Daniel Colman (sound designer/supervising Foley editor); Jeff K. Brunello (sound editor); Doug Madick, Richard Partlow (Foley artists)	NBC
2007	ER	"The War Comes Home"	Walter Newman (supervising sound editor); Al Gomez (supervising Foley editor); Adam Johnston, Kenneth Young (sound editors); Casey J. Crabtree, Michael Crabtree (Foley artist)	NBC
2007	Dexter	"The British Invasion"	Fred Judkins (supervising sound editor); Andrew Ellerd, Stuart Martin, Gary Megregian (sound editors); Dale W. Perry (Foley artist)	Showtime
2007	Eureka	"E = MC...?"	Daniel Colman, Jack Levy (supervising sound editors); Jeff K. Brunello (sound designer); Sam C. Lewis (Foley editor); Doug Madick, Richard Partlow (Foley artists)	Sci Fi
2007	Smallville	"Phantom"	Michael E. Lawshe (supervising sound editor); Norval D. Crutcher III (co-supervising sound editor); Timothy A. Cleveland, Paul J. Diller (sound designers); Marc Meyer (sound editor); Casey J. Crabtree, Michael Crabtree (Foley artists)	The CW
2007	Supernatural	"All Hell Breaks Loose (Part 2)"	Michael E. Lawshe (supervising sound editor); Norval D. Crutcher III (co-supervising sound editor); Marc Meyer (sound designer); Stuart Calderon, Timothy A. Cleveland, Paul J. Diller, David Lynch (sound editors); Casey J. Crabtree, Michael Crabtree (Foley artists)	The CW

Best Sound Editing - Short Form Sound Effects and Foley in Television

Year	Program	Episode(s)	Nominees	Network
2008	Battlestar Galactica	"He That Believeth in Me"	Daniel Colman (supervising sound editor/designer); Jack Levy (supervising sound editor); Sam C. Lewis (supervising Foley editor); Doug Madick, Richard Partlow (Foley artists)	Sci Fi
2008	CSI: Crime Scene Investigation	"Bull"	Mace Matiosian (supervising sound editor); David F. Van Slyke (sound designer); Chad Hughes, David Van (sound effects editors); James Bailey, Joseph T. Sabella (Foley artists)	CBS
2008	CSI: Miami	"Tipping Point"	Tim Kimmel (supervising sound editor); Bradley C. Katona (sound designer); James Bailey, Joseph T. Sabella (Foley artists)	CBS
2008	Eureka	"Bad to the Drone"	Daniel Colman, Jack Levy (supervising sound editors); Jeff K. Brunello (sound designer); Sam C. Lewis (supervising Foley editor); Doug Madick, Richard Partlow (Foley artists)	Sci Fi
2008	Life	"Did You Feel That?"	Victor Iorillo (supervising sound editor); Craig T. Rosevear (supervising Foley editor); Harry Woolway (sound designer); Michael Lyle, Paul Stevenson (Foley artists)	NBC
2008	My Own Worst Enemy	"Breakdown"	Walter Newman (supervising sound editor/designer); Bob Redpath (supervising sound editor); Jerry Edemann (supervising Foley editor); Adam Johnston, Kenneth Young (sound editors); Doug Reed, Jody Thomas (Foley artists)	NBC
2008	Lost	"The Shape of Things to Come"	Thomas DeGorter (supervising sound editor); Paula Fairfield, Carla Murray (sound designers); Joseph Schultz, Geordy Sincavage (sound editors); James Bailey, Cynthia Merrill (Foley artists)	ABC
2009	House	"Epic Fail"	Brad North (supervising sound editor/designer); Luis Galdames (sound designer/effects editor); Craig T. Rosevear (supervising Foley editor); Harry Woolway (Foley editor); Michael Lyle, Paul Stevenson (Foley artists)	Fox
2009	Battlestar Galactica	"Islanded in a Stream of Stars"	Daniel Colman (supervising sound editor/designer); Jack Levy (supervising sound editor); Sam C. Lewis (supervising Foley editor); Doug Madick, Richard Partlow (Foley artists)	Syfy
2009	CSI: Crime Scene Investigation	"Mascara"	Mace Matiosian (supervising sound editor); David F. Van Slyke (sound designer/effects editor); Ruth Adelman (Foley editor); James Bailey, Joseph T. Sabella (Foley artists)	CBS
2009	CSI: Miami	"Point of Impact"	Tim Kimmel (supervising sound editor); Bradley C. Katona (sound designer); James Bailey, Joseph T. Sabella (Foley artists)	CBS
2009	CSI: NY	"Cuckoo's Nest"	Mark Relyea (supervising sound editor); David Barbee (sound designer); Kevin McCullough (Foley editor); James Bailey, Joseph T. Sabella (Foley artists)	CBS
2009	Fringe	"Unleashed"	Thomas A. Harris (supervising sound editor); Michael Ferdie (sound designer/effects editor); Nick Neutra (supervising Foley editor); Bob Kellough (sound effects editor); Joseph Schultz (Foley editor); Sanaa Kelley, Cynthia Merrill (Foley artists)	Fox
2009	Trauma	"All's Fair"	Daniel Colman (supervising sound editor); Sam C. Lewis (supervising Foley editor); Jeff K. Brunello (sound effects editor); Ginger Geary, Doug Madick (Foley artists)	NBC
2009	Warehouse 13	"MacPherson"	Daniel Colman (supervising sound editor/designer); Jack Levy (supervising sound editor); Jeff K. Brunello (sound designer); Sam C. Lewis (supervising Foley editor); Doug Madick, Monique Reymond (Foley artists)	Syfy

=== 2010s ===
Year	Program	Episode(s)	Nominees	Network
2010	The Tudors	"Sixth and the Final Wife"	Jane Tattersall (supervising sound editor, sound effects editor); Kathy Choi (sound effects editor); Goro Koyama, Andy Malcolm (Foley artists)	Showtime
2010	Breaking Bad	"One Minute"	Kurt Nicholas Forshager (supervising sound editor); Mark Cookson, Cormac Funge (sound effects editors); Gregg Barbanell, Dominique Decaudain (Foley artists)	AMC
2010	The Walking Dead	"Guts"	Kenneth Young (supervising sound editor, sound effects editor); Walter Newman (supervising sound editor); Jerry Edemann (supervising Foley editor); Marc Meyer, Darleen Stoker (sound effects editors); Andy Kopetzky, Peter Reynolds (Foley editors); David Lee Fein, Hilda Hodges (Foley artists)	AMC
2010	The Bridge	"Chain of Fools"	Kevin Howard (supervising sound editor, sound effects editor); Jason MacNeill, Dan Sexton (sound effects editors); Steve Copley (Foley editor); Virginia Storey (Foley artist)	CTV
2010	Human Target	"Pilot"	Walter Newman (supervising sound editor/designer); Peter Austin (supervising sound editor); Kenneth Young (sound designer/effects editor); Jerry Edemann (supervising Foley editor); Tim Farrell, Adam Johnston (sound effects editors); Andy Kopetzky, Peter Reynolds (Foley editors); Monette Melvin, Rick Owens (Foley artists)	Fox
2010	Lost	"Ab Aeterno"	Thomas DeGorter (supervising sound editor); Paula Fairfield, Carla Murray (sound designers); Joseph Schultz (sound effects editor); Geordy Sincavage (Foley editor); James Bailey, Adam DeCoster (Foley artists)	ABC
2010	Supernatural	"Point of No Return"	Michael E. Lawshe (supervising sound editor, sound effects editor); Norval D. Crutcher III (supervising sound editor); Marc Meyer (sound designer/effects editor); Trevor Sperry (supervising Foley editor); Timothy A. Cleveland, Paul J. Diller (sound effects editors); Karyn Foster, Ron Salaises (sound editors); Monette Melvin, Rick Owen (Foley artists)	The CW
2010	True Blood	"I Smell a Rat"	John Benson (supervising sound editor); Stuart Martin (sound designer); Gary Megregian (sound effects editor); Zane D. Bruce, Jeff Gunn (Foley artists)	HBO
2011	Game of Thrones	"Winter Is Coming"	Stefan Henrix (supervising sound editor); Andy Kennedy (sound designer); Steve Fanagan (supervising Foley editor); Niall Brady, Fiadhnait McCann, Jon Stevenson (sound effects editors); Caoimhe Doyle, Eoghan McDonnell (Foley artists); Billy Quinn (sound effects recordist)	HBO
2011	The Borgias	"Death, on a Pale Horse"	Jane Tattersall (supervising sound editor); Martin Gwynn Jones (Foley editor); Goro Koyama, Andy Malcolm (Foley artists)	Showtime
2011	Homeland	"Pilot"	Mark Lanza (supervising sound editor); Jeffrey R. Whitcher (sound designer); Shawn Kennelly (supervising Foley editor); Rickley W. Dumm, Jonathan Golodner, Cathie Speakman (sound editors); Laura Macias, Vince Nicastro (Foley artists)	Showtime
2011	Breaking Bad	"Face Off"	Kurt Nicholas Forshager (supervising sound editor); Mark Cookson, Cormac Funge (sound effects editors); Jeffrey Cranford (sound editor); Gregg Barbanell, Dominique Decaudain (Foley artists)	AMC
2011	Fringe	"The Day We Died"	Thomas A. Harris (supervising sound editor); Frederick Howard (sound designer); Jerry Edemann (supervising Foley editor); Michael Ferdie, Aleksandr Gruzdev (sound editors); Andy Kopetzky (Foley editor); Richard Partlow, Shelley Roden (Foley artists)	Fox
2011	House	"Bombshells"	Brad North (supervising sound editor); Luis Galdames (sound designer); Craig T. Rosevear (supervising Foley editor); Harry Woolway (Foley editor); Michael Lyle, Paul Stevenson (Foley artists)	Fox
2011	Rizzoli & Isles	"Can I Get a Witness?"	Jeremy J. Gordon (supervising sound editor); Todd Murakami (sound designer); Brian Nichols (supervising Foley editor); Michael Sana, John Snider, Jordan Wilby (sound editors); Noel Vought (Foley artist)	TNT
2011	Smallville	"Dominion"	Norval D. Crutcher III, Michael E. Lawshe (supervising sound editors); Timothy A. Cleveland (sound designer/effects editor); Trevor Sperry (supervising Foley editor); Paul J. Diller, Robert Ramirez (sound effects editors); Marc Meyer (sound effects/Foley editor); Monette Melvin, Rick Owens (Foley artists)	The CW
2012	American Horror Story: Asylum	"Welcome to Briarcliff"	Gary Megregian (supervising sound editor/designer), Timothy A. Cleveland (sound designer), Andrew Spencer Dawson (supervising Foley editor), Noel Vought (Foley artist)	FX
2012	Alcatraz	"Pilot"	Thomas DeGorter, Brett Hinton (supervising sound editors); Mark Allen (sound designer); Geordy Sincavage (supervising Foley editor); Eddie Rogers (sound effects editor); Vincent Guisetti, Alex Ullrich (Foley artists)	Fox
2012	Alphas	"Wake Up Call"	Jack Levy (supervising sound editor); Jeff K. Brunello (sound designer); Sam C. Lewis (supervising Foley editor); Craig Polding (sound effects editor); Matthew Manselle (Foley editor); Brooke Lowrey, Brian Straub (Foley artists)	Syfy
2012	The Borgias	"The Siege at Forli"	Jane Tattersall (supervising sound editor); Martin Gwynn Jones (supervising Foley editor); Goro Koyama, Andy Malcolm (Foley artists)	Showtime
2012	Game of Thrones	"Blackwater"	Peter Brown (supervising sound editor); Stephen P. Robinson (sound designer); Paul Aulicino (supervising Foley editor); Brett Voss (Foley editor); James Moriana, Jeffrey Wilhoit (Foley artists)	HBO
2012	Grimm	"The Other Side"	Susan Cahill (supervising sound editor); Cormac Funge (co-supervising sound editor); Jason T. Edwards (sound designer); Craig T. Rosevear (supervising Foley editor); Tiffany S. Griffith, Johanna Turner (sound editors); Pamela Kahn, Dean Minnerly (Foley artists)	NBC
2012	The Walking Dead	"Beside the Dying Fire"	Jerry Ross (supervising sound editor); Tim Farrell (sound designer); Clayton Weber (supervising Foley editor); David Lee Fein, Hilda Hodges (Foley artists)	AMC
2013	Breaking Bad	"Felina"	Kurt Nicholas Forshager (supervising sound editor); Mark Cookson, Cormac Funge (sound effects editors); Tim Boggs, Jeffrey Cranford (Foley editors); Gregg Barbanell, Dominique Decaudain (Foley artists); Stacey Michaels (Foley mixer); Eric Justen (sound effects re-recording mixer)	AMC
2013	Boardwalk Empire	"White Horse Pike"	Fred Rosenberg (supervising sound editor), Ruy García (sound designer), Steven Visscher (supervising Foley editor), Roland Vajs (sound effects editor), Bill Orrico (Foley editor), Marko A. Costanzo (Foley artist)	HBO
2013	Game of Thrones	"The Climb"	Tim Kimmel (supervising sound editor); Paula Fairfield (sound designer); Brett Voss (supervising Foley editor); Bradley C. Katona (sound effects editor); James Moriana, Jeffrey Wilhoit (Foley artists)	HBO
2013	The Borgias	"The Face of Death"	Jane Tattersall (supervising sound editor); Martin Gwynn Jones (supervising Foley editor); Goro Koyama, Andy Malcolm (Foley artists)	Showtime
2013	Homeland	"Uh... Oh... Ah..."	Craig A. Dellinger (supervising sound editor); Jonathan Golodner (sound designer); Shawn Kennelly (supervising Foley editor); Mark Peterson (sound editor); Michelle Kennelly, Vince Nicastro (Foley artists)	Showtime
2013	Once Upon a Time in Wonderland	"Down the Rabbit Hole"	Thomas DeGorter, Joseph Schultz (supervising sound editors); Paul Menichini (sound designer); Arno Stephanian (supervising Foley editor); Keith Bilderbeck, John Chalfant (sound editors); Noel Vought (Foley artist)	ABC
2013	Vikings	"Trial"	Jane Tattersall (supervising sound editor); Steve Medeiros (sound designer); Brennan Mercer (supervising Foley editor); Goro Koyama, Andy Malcolm (Foley artists)	History
2013	The Walking Dead	"Home"	Jerry Ross (supervising sound editor); Tim Farrell, Lou Thomas (sound designers); Clayton Weber (supervising Foley editor); Gregg Barbanell, Dominique Decaudain (Foley artists)	AMC
2014	Game of Thrones	"The Children"	Tim Kimmel (supervising sound editor); Paula Fairfield (sound designer); Brett Voss (supervising Foley editor); Bradley C. Katona (sound effects editor); Dylan Tuomy-Wilhoit, Jeffrey Wilhoit (Foley artists)	HBO
2014	The 100	"We Are Grounders – Part II"	Peter Austin, Norval D. Crutcher III (supervising sound editors); Peter D. Lago (sound designer); Mitch Gettleman (supervising Foley editor); Marc Meyer (sound effects editor); Catherine Harper, Ellen Heuer (Foley artists)	The CW
2014	Fargo	"Buridan's Ass"	Kevin W. Buchholz, Frank Laratta (supervising sound editors); John Peccatiello (sound designer); Andrew Morgado (supervising Foley editor); Mark Server (sound effects editor); Adam DeCoster (Foley artist)	FX
2014	Peaky Blinders	"Episode 1"	Lee Walpole (supervising sound editor), Jim Goddard (sound designer), Catherine Thomas (supervising Foley editor), Andie Derrick (Foley artist)	BBC Two
2014	Penny Dreadful	"Night Work"	Jane Tattersall (supervising sound editor); Oriol Tarragó (sound designer); Marc Bech, David Rose (sound effects editors); Goro Koyama, Andy Malcolm (Foley artists)	Showtime
2014	True Detective	"The Secret Fate of All Life"	Eliza Paley (supervising sound editor), Lidia Tamplenizza (supervising Foley editor), Mariusz Glabinski (sound effects editor), Jay Peck (Foley artist)	HBO
2014	Vikings	"Answers in Blood"	David McCallum, Jane Tattersall (supervising sound editors); Steve Medeiros (sound designer); Andy Malcolm (supervising Foley editor); Brennan Mercer (Foley editor); Sandra Fox, Goro Koyama (Foley artists)	History
2015	Game of Thrones	"Hardhome"	Tim Kimmel (supervising sound editor); Paula Fairfield (sound designer); Brett Voss (supervising Foley editor); Bradley C. Katona (sound effects editor); Pernell L. Salinas (Foley editor); Dylan Tuomy-Wilhoit, Jeffrey Wilhoit (Foley artists)	HBO
2015	Better Call Saul	"Five-O"	Kurt Nicholas Forshager (supervising sound editor); Mark Cookson (sound effects editor); Jeffrey Cranford (Foley editor); Tim Chilton, Jerry Trent (Foley artists)	AMC
2015	Fargo	"The Castle"	Kurt Nicholas Forshager (supervising sound editor); Rob Bertola, Paul Shikata (sound effects editors); John Elliot (Foley artist)	FX
2015	Marco Polo	"One Hundred Eyes"	Dave Paterson (supervising sound editor), Rachel Chancey (supervising Foley editor, Foley artist), Glenfield Payne (sound effects editor)	Netflix
2015	The Last Ship	"Cry Havoc"	G. Michael Graham (supervising sound editor/designer); Bill Bell (supervising Foley editor); Bob Costanza, Mike Dickeson (sound effects editors); Tim Chilton, Jerry Trent (Foley artists)	TNT
2015	True Detective	"Down Will Come"	Mandell Winter (supervising sound editor); David Esparza (sound designer); Eryne Prine (supervising Foley editor); Casey Genton (sound effects editor); Melissa Kennelly, Vince Nicastro (Foley artists)	HBO
2015	Turn: Washington's Spies	"Gunpowder, Treason and Plot"	George Haddad (supervising sound editor); Angelo Palazzo (sound designer/effects editor); Chad J. Hughes (sound designer); Darrin Mann (supervising Foley editor); Matthew Thomas Hall (sound effects editor); Gregg Baxter, Catherine Harper (Foley artists)	AMC
2015	Vikings	"To the Gates!"	Jane Tattersall (supervising sound editor); Steve Medeiros (sound designer); Brennan Mercer (supervising Foley editor); Sandra Fox, Goro Koyama (Foley artists)	History
2016	Westworld	"Trompe L'Oeil"	Thomas DeGorter, Matt Sawelson (supervising sound editors); Mark Allen, Marc Glassman (sound designers); Michael S. Head, Geordy Sincavage (Foley editors); Tara Blume, Rick Owens (Foley artists)	HBO
2016	American Horror Story: Roanoke	"Chapter 1"	Gary Megregian (supervising sound editor), Timothy A. Cleveland (sound designer), Paul J. Diller (sound effects editor), Noel Vought (Foley artist)	FX
2016	Better Call Saul	"Nailed"	Kurt Nicholas Forshager (supervising sound editor); Mark Cookson (sound effects editor); Jeffrey Cranford (Foley editor); Tim Chilton, Jerry Trent (Foley artists)	AMC
2016	Black Sails	"XX."	Benjamin L. Cook (supervising sound editor); Jeffrey A. Pitts, Tim Tuchrello (sound effects editors); Brett Voss (Foley editor); Dylan Tuomy-Wilhoit, Jeffrey Wilhoit (Foley artists)	Starz
2016	Game of Thrones	"Battle of the Bastards"	Tim Kimmel (supervising sound editor); Paula Fairfield (sound designer); Bradley C. Katona (sound effects editor); John Matter, Brett Voss (Foley editors); Dylan Tuomy-Wilhoit, Jeffrey Wilhoit (Foley artists)	HBO
2016	Marco Polo	"Heirs"	Dave Paterson (supervising sound editor); Glenfield Payne, Damian Volpe (sound effects editors); Rachel Chancey (Foley artist)	Netflix
2016	Narcos	"The Good, the Bad, and the Dead"	Randle Akerson (supervising sound editor), Dino Dimuro (sound effects editor), Erik Culp (Foley editor), Steve Hammond (Foley artist)	Netflix
2016	Stranger Things	"Chapter Eight: The Upside Down"	Brad North (supervising sound editor); Craig Henighan (sound designer); Jonathan Golodner, Jordan Wilby (sound effects editors); Jacob McNaughton (Foley editor); Noel Vought (Foley artist)	Netflix

Outstanding Achievement in Sound Editing - Sound Effects and Foley for Episodic Short Form Broadcast Media

Year	Program	Episode(s)	Nominees	Network
2017	Game of Thrones	"The Spoils of War"	Tim Kimmel (supervising sound editor); Paula Fairfield (sound designer); Bradley C. Katona (sound effects editor); John Matter, Brett Voss (Foley editors); Dylan Tuomy-Wilhoit, Jeffrey Wilhoit (Foley artists)	HBO
2017	The Brave	"Stealth"	Jay Nierenberg (supervising sound editor); Trevor Gates (sound designer); Terry Boyd Jr., Benjamin Gieschen (Foley editors); Elizabeth Rainey, Jody Thomas (Foley artists)	NBC
2017	Mr. Robot	"eps3.4_runtime-error.r00"	Kevin W. Buchholz (supervising sound editor); Dan Kremer (sound effects editor); Adam DeCoster, Rene Garcia, Andrew Morgado (sound editors); Randall Guth, Alex Knickerbocker, Mike Marino (Foley editors); Dominique Decaudain, Nancy Parker (Foley artists)	USA
2017	Shooter	"The Dark End of the Street"	Mark Relyea (supervising sound editor); David Barbee (sound designer); Russell Topal (sound effects editor); Joseph T. Sabella, Damien Smith (Foley artists)	USA
2017	The Punisher	"Memento Mori"	Lauren Stephens (supervising sound editor); Jordan Wilby (sound designer); Jonathan Golodner (sound effects editor); Antony Zeller (Foley editor); Zane D. Bruce, Lindsay Pepper (Foley artists)	Netflix
2017	Stranger Things	"Chapter Eight: The Mind Flayer"	Brad North (supervising sound editor); Craig Henighan (sound designer); David Werntz, Jordan Wilby (sound effects editors); Antony Zeller (Foley editor); Zane D. Bruce, Lindsay Pepper (Foley artists)	Netflix
2017	Taboo	"Episode 8"	Lee Walpole (supervising sound editor); Saoirse Christopherson, Alex Ellerington, Andy Kennedy (sound effects editors); Andie Derrick, Catherine Thomas (Foley artists)	FX
2017	Vikings	"The Reckoning"	Jane Tattersall (supervising sound editor); Steve Medeiros (sound designer); Brennan Mercer (sound effects editor); Sandra Fox, Goro Koyama (Foley artists)	History
2018	Atlanta	"Teddy Perkins"	Trevor Gates (supervising sound editor); David Barbee (sound effects editor); Michael S. Head, Jordan McClain, Geordy Sincavage (Foley editors); Tara Blume, Matt Salib (Foley artists)	FX
2018	The First	"Near and Far"	Brian Armstrong, Thomas DeGorter (supervising sound editors); Owen Granich-Young, Patrick O'Sullivan (sound designers); Michael S. Head, Geordy Sincavage (Foley editors)	Hulu
2018	Nightflyers	"Torches and Pitchforks"	Jon Greasley (supervising sound designer); Dan Gamache, Shaughnessy Hare (sound effects editors); Brad J. Bakelmun, Ron Mellegers (Foley editors); Tim O'Connell, John Sievert (Foley artists)	Syfy
2018	The Terror	"Go for Broke"	Lee Walpole (supervising sound editor); Saoirse Christopherson, Sarah Elias, Jim Goddard, Andy Kennedy (sound effects editors); Catherine Thomas, Anna Wright (Foley artists)	AMC
2018	The Walking Dead	"A New Beginning"	Jon Mete, Ben Wilkins (supervising sound editors); James Gallivan (sound effects editor); Trevor Sperry (Foley editor); James Bailey, Sanaa Kelley, Doug Madick (Foley artists)	AMC
2018	Tom Clancy's Jack Ryan	"French Connection"	Benjamin L. Cook (supervising sound editor); Hector C. Gika, Shaughnessy Hare, Paul Pirola (sound effects editors); Dylan Tuomy-Wilhoit, Jeffrey Wilhoit (Foley artists)	Amazon
2018	Vikings	"Moments of Vision"	Jane Tattersall (supervising sound editor); Steve Medeiros (sound effects editor); Davi Aquino, Christopher King (Foley editors); Goro Koyama (Foley artist)	History
2018	The X-Files	"This"	Thierry J. Couturier (supervising sound editor); Cormac Funge (sound designer); Pete Nichols (sound effects editor); Ginger Geary, Sam C. Lewis (Foley editors); Gretchen Thoma (Foley artist)	Fox
2019	The Mandalorian	"Chapter 1"	David Acord, Matthew Wood (supervising sound editors); Jonathan Borland, Chris Frazier, Pascal Garneau, Steve Slanec, Bonnie Wild (sound effects editors); Richard Gould (Foley editor); Ronni Brown, Jana Vance (Foley artists)	Disney+
2019	Catch-22	"Episode 1"	Jerry Ross (supervising sound editor); Christopher Assells (sound designer); Jeffrey Fuller (sound effects editor); Katherine Rose, Clayton Weber (Foley editors); Catherine Harper (Foley artist)	Hulu
2019	Daybreak	"Josh vs. the Apocalypse Part 1"	John Benson (supervising sound editor); Todd Murakami, John Snider (sound effects editors); Larry Hopkins, Antony Zeller (Foley editors); Zane D. Bruce (Foley artist)	Netflix
2019	Hanna	"Forest"	Joe Beal (supervising sound editor), Andy Kennedy (sound designer)	Amazon
2019	Tom Clancy's Jack Ryan	"Persona Non Grata"	Jon Wakeham (supervising sound editor) Russell Topal (sound designer), Will Digby (sound effects editor), Dylan Tuomy-Wilhoit (Foley artist)	Amazon
2019	Mr. Robot	"405 Method Not Allowed"	Kevin W. Buchholz, Brett Hinton (supervising sound editors); Daniel Colman, Davis Fossum, Dan Kremer, Patrick O'Sullivan (sound effects editors); Randall Guth, Mike Marino (Foley editors); Dominique Decaudain, Pamela Kahn (Foley artists)	USA
2019	The Terror: Infamy	"Taizo"	Gord Hillier (supervising sound editor), Patrick Haskill (sound designer), Maureen Murphy (Foley artist), Dean Giammarco (Foley editor)	AMC
2019	Vikings	"What Happens in the Cave"	Steve Medeiros (supervising sound editor); Chris King (Foley editor); Sandra Fox, Goro Koyama (Foley artists)	History

=== 2020s ===
Year	Program	Episode(s)	Nominees	Network
2020	The Mandalorian	"Chapter 13: The Jedi"	David Acord, Matthew Wood (supervising sound editors); Benjamin A. Burtt, J.R. Grubbs (sound effects editors); Richard Gould (Foley editor); Ronni Brown, Jana Vance (Foley artists)	Disney+
2020	The 100	"The Final War"	Norval Crutcher, Vincent Tennant (supervising sound editors); Peter D. Lago (sound designer); Adam DeCoster, Jacob Houchen, Clayton Webber (Foley editors); Sanaa Kelley (Foley artist)	The CW
2020	Agents of S.H.I.E.L.D.	"What We're Fighting For"	Daniel Colman (supervising sound editor); Randall Guth (Foley editor); Dominique Decaudain, Pamela Kahn, Mike Marino, Nancy Parker (Foley artists)	ABC
2020	The Alienist	"Belly of the Beast"	Matthew Skelding (supervising sound editor); Tom Jenkins, Al Sirkett (sound designers); Mathias Schuster (Foley editor); Barnaby Smyth (Foley artist)	TNT
2020	Snowpiercer	"Trouble Comes Sideways"	Sandra Portman (supervising sound editor), James Fonnyadt (sound designer), Gregorio Gomez (sound effects editor), Dario DiSanto (Foley editor), Maureen Murphy (Foley artist)	TNT
2020	Hanna	"The Trial"	Joe Beal (supervising sound editor), Steve Browell (sound designer), Phillip Clements (Foley editor), Anna Wright (Foley artist)	Amazon
2020	Locke & Key	"Head Games"	J.R. Fountain (supervising sound editor), Dashen Naidoo (sound effects editor), Steve Baine (Foley artist)	Netflix
2020	The Right Stuff	"Sierra Hotel"	Walter Newman (supervising sound editor); Kenneth Young (sound designer); Rickley W. Dumm (sound effects editor); Peter Reynolds (Foley editor); Adam DeCoster, Sanna Kelley (Foley artists)	Disney+

== Programs with multiple awards ==
4 awards

- Game of Thrones (HBO)

3 awards

- ER (NBC)
- Lost (ABC)

2 awards

- CSI: Crime Scene Investigation (CBS)
- The Mandalorian (Disney+)

== Programs with multiple nominations ==
9 nominations

- CSI: Crime Scene Investigation
- ER (NBC)

8 nominations

- Smallville (The WB/CW)

7 nominations

- Game of Thrones (HBO)

6 nominations

- CSI: Miami (CBS)
- Third Watch (NBC)
- Vikings (History)

5 nominations

- Lost (ABC)
- The X-Files (Fox)

4 nominations

- CSI: NY (CBS)
- Supernatural (The WB/CW)
- The Walking Dead (AMC)

3 nominations

- Battlestar Galactica (Sci Fi)
- Breaking Bad (AMC)
- The Borgias (Showtime)
- House (Fox)

2 nominations

- The 100 (The CW)
- Alias (ABC)
- American Horror Story (FX)
- Better Call Saul (AMC)
- Buffy the Vampire Slayer (The WB)
- Eureka (Sci Fi)
- Fargo (FX)
- Fringe (Fox)
- Hanna (Amazon)
- Hercules: The Legendary Journeys (Syndicated)
- Homeland (Showtime)
- The Mandalorian (Disney+)
- Marco Polo (Netflix)
- Millennium (Fox)
- Mr. Robot (USA)
- Nash Bridges (CBS)
- The Pretender (NBC)
- Stranger Things (Netflix)
- The Terror (AMC)
- Tom Clancy's Jack Ryan (Amazon)
- True Detective (HBO)
