= Mark Relyea =

American sound editor

- Born: Albany, New York
- Education: Clayton A. Bouton High School
- Alma mater: College of Saint Rose
- Occupations: Sound editor, producer
- Years active: 1995–present

Mark Relyea is an American sound editor.

== Filmography ==
=== Film ===
Year	Title	Credited as	Notes
1995	The Grass Harp	Sound assistant	
1996	Kingpin	ADR editor	
1996	Bullet	ADR assistant	
1996	Kounterfeit	ADR supervisor, sound editor	
1997	Steel	ADR editor	
1997	Dead Tides	ADR supervisor, sound editor	
1997	The Bad Pack	ADR supervisor	
1998	Shelter	ADR supervisor	
1998	Wicked	ADR supervisor	
1999	Just the Ticket	ADR supervisor	
2001	Choke	Co-sound supervisor	
2001	Snipes	Supervising sound editor	
2003	High Tension	Sound effects editor	
2003	The Last Stop Café	Co-producer	
2010	Salt and Silicone	Supervising sound editor	
2011	I Melt with You	ADR editor	
2018	Cruel Hearts	Executive producer	

=== Television ===
Year	Title	Credited as	Notes
1995	Land's End	ADR editor	
1996	To Face Her Past	ADR supervisor	
1997-1999	Silk Stalkings	Sound supervisor	24 episodes
1998-2000	Pensacola: Wings of Gold	Sound supervisor	42 episodes
2000	Cheaters	ADR editor	
2001	Definitely Maybe	Supervising sound editor	
2000-2001	18 Wheels of Justice	Sound supervisor	34 episodes
2001	Walking Shadow	Sound supervisor	
2001	The Chronicle	Sound supervisor	8 episodes
2002	The X-Files	Sound editor	10 episodes
2002	RFK	Supervising sound editor	
2003	Young MacGyver	Supervising sound editor	
2004	Harry Green and Eugene	Supervising sound editor	Pilot
2004	Wonderfalls	Supervising sound editor	17 episodes
2005	Huff	Sound supervisor	2 episodes
2005	Blind Justice	ADR supervisor	10 episodes
2005-2007	Gilmore Girls	Supervising sound editor	43 episodes
2007-2008	Men in Trees	Supervising sound editor	14 episodes
2004-2011	Entourage	Supervising sound editor	76 episodes
2008-2013	CSI: NY	Supervising sound editor	103 episodes
2013-2014	Hostages	Supervising sound editor	14 episodes
2014	Power	Supervising sound editor	1 episode
2012-2014	The Newsroom	Supervising sound editor	18 episodes
2015	Silicon Valley	Supervising sound editor	10 episodes
2015	Blindspot	Supervising sound editor	66 episodes
2015	Ballers	Supervising sound editor	14 episodes
2016-2018	Shooter	Supervising sound editor	31 episodes

== Awards and nominations ==
Year	Award	Category	Title	Result
2010	Golden Reel Award	Best Sound Editing - Short Form Sound Effects and Foley in Television	CSI: NY	Nominated
2010	Golden Reel Award	Best Sound Editing - Short Form Dialogue and ADR in Television	CSI: NY	Nominated
2011	Primetime Emmy Award	Outstanding Sound Editing for a Series	CSI: NY	Nominated
2013	Golden Reel Award	Best Sound Editing - Short Form Dialogue and ADR in Television	The Newsroom	Won
2013	Golden Reel Award	Best Sound Editing - Long Form Dialogue and ADR in Television	The Newsroom	Nominated
2013	Golden Reel Award	Best Sound Editing - Long Form Sound Effects and Foley in Television	The Newsroom	Nominated
2014	Golden Reel Award	Best Sound Editing - Short Form Dialogue and ADR in Television	The Newsroom	Nominated
2015	Golden Reel Award	Best Sound Editing - Short Form Dialogue and ADR in Television	The Newsroom	Won
2016	Golden Reel Award	Best Sound Editing - Short Form Dialogue and ADR in Television	Blindspot	Nominated
2017	Golden Reel Award	Best Sound Editing - Short Form Dialogue and ADR in Television	Shooter	Nominated
2018	Golden Reel Award	Outstanding Achievement in Sound Editing - Sound Effects, Foley, Music, Dialogue and ADR for Live Action Broadcast Media Under 30 Minutes	Ballers	Nominated
2018	Golden Reel Award	Best Sound Editing - Short Form Sound Effects and Foley in Television	Shooter	Nominated
2018	Primetime Emmy Award	Outstanding Sound Editing For A Comedy Or Drama Series (Half-Hour) And Animation	Ballers	Nominated
2019	Primetime Emmy Award	Outstanding Sound Editing For A Comedy Or Drama Series (Half-Hour) And Animation	Ballers	Nominated
