= Motion Picture Sound Editors =

American society of film sound editors

- Seal of the MPSE
- Abbreviation: MPSE
- Formation: 1953; 73 years ago
- Type: Professional society
- Website: www.mpse.org

Motion Picture Sound Editors (MPSE) is an American professional society of motion picture sound editors founded in 1953. The society's goals are to educate others about and increase the recognition of the sound and music editors, show the artistic merit of the soundtracks, and improve the professional relationship of its members. The society is not to be confused with an industry union, such as the I.A.T.S.E. The names of active members of the MPSE will generally appear in film credits with the post-nominal letters "MPSE".

== History ==
The existing Golden Reel Award design was introduced on March 31, 1984, at the award ceremonies for the year 1983 held at the Beverly Wilshire Hotel Grand Ballroom, Beverly Hills, California. The trophy was designed by Pat and Ken Anderson of the Anderson Trophy Company. The award statues are made by New York firm, Society Awards.

== Membership requirements ==
The following are required for the membership application:

- A three-year list of credits as one (or more) of the following:
  - Sound editor
  - Sound designer
  - Dialogue editor
  - ADR editor
  - Sound effects editor
  - Foley artist
  - Music editor
- Two active MPSE member sponsors
- One letter of a sponsoring active MPSE member

== Golden Reel Awards ==
Since 1953, The Golden Reel Awards are an annual ceremony dedicated to honoring outstanding achievement in sound editing in film, television, and across the entertainment industry.

=== Feature Film categories ===
- Golden Reel Award for Outstanding Achievement in Sound Editing – Dialogue and ADR for Feature Film
- Golden Reel Award for Outstanding Achievement in Sound Editing – Sound Effects and Foley for Feature Film
- Golden Reel Award for Outstanding Achievement in Sound Editing – Feature Music
- Golden Reel Award for Outstanding Achievement in Sound Editing – Musical for Feature Film (until 2020)
- Golden Reel Award for Outstanding Achievement in Sound Editing – Sound Effects, Foley, Dialogue and ADR for Animated Feature Film
- Golden Reel Award for Outstanding Achievement in Sound Editing – Sound Effects, Foley, Dialogue and ADR for Foreign Language Feature Film
- Golden Reel Award for Outstanding Achievement in Sound Editing – Sound Effects, Foley, Dialogue and ADR for Feature Documentary

=== Broadcast Media categories ===
- Golden Reel Award for Outstanding Achievement in Sound Editing – Series 1 Hour – Dialogue/ADR
- Golden Reel Award for Outstanding Achievement in Sound Editing – Series 1 Hour – Effects / Foley
- Golden Reel Award for Outstanding Achievement in Sound Editing – Non-Theatrical Feature
- Golden Reel Award for Outstanding Achievement in Sound Editing – Non-Theatrical Animation
- Golden Reel Award for Outstanding Achievement in Sound Editing – Series 1 Hour – Comedy or Drama – Music
- Golden Reel Award for Outstanding Achievement in Sound Editing - Music Score and Musical for Episodic Short Form Broadcast Media (until 2020)
- Golden Reel Award for Outstanding Achievement in Sound Editing – 1/2 Hour – Comedy or Drama
- Golden Reel Award for Outstanding Achievement in Sound Editing – Animation Series or Short
- Golden Reel Award for Outstanding Achievement in Sound Editing – Non-Theatrical Documentary
- Golden Reel Award for Outstanding Achievement in Sound Editing – Limited Series or Anthology
- Golden Reel Award for Outstanding Achievement in Sound Editing – Single Presentation (until 2020)
- Golden Reel Award for Outstanding Achievement in Sound Editing – Dialogue and ADR for Episodic Short Form Broadcast Media (until 2020)
- Golden Reel Award for Outstanding Achievement in Sound Editing – Sound Effects and Foley for Episodic Short Form Broadcast Media (until 2020)

=== Gaming ===
- Best Sound Editing: Computer Entertainment
  - 2000: Starlancer
  - 2002: Ambush
  - 2004: Terminator 3: Rise of the Machines
  - 2005: GoldenEye: Rogue Agent
  - 2006: Onimusha: Dawn of Dreams
  - 2007: Hellgate: London
  - 2008: StarCraft II: Wings of Liberty
  - 2009: Gears of War 2
  - 2010: Uncharted 2: Among Thieves
  - 2011: Epic Mickey
  - 2012: Need for Speed: The Run
  - 2013: Resident Evil 6
  - 2014: StarCraft II: Heart of the Swarm
  - 2015: League of Legends: A New Dawn
  - 2016: Halo 5: Guardians
  - 2017: Gears of War 4
  - 2018: Halo Wars 2

=== Special categories ===
- Career Achievement Award
- Filmmaker's Award
- Verna Fields Award for Sound Editing in a Student Film
- Ethel Crutcher Scholarship
