= Golden Reel Award for Outstanding Achievement in Sound Editing – Music Score and Musical for Episodic Long Form Broadcast Media =

- Country: United States
- Presented by: Motion Picture Sound Editors
- Currently held by: Sebastian Zuleta – Wu-Tang: An American Saga (2021)

The Golden Reel Award for Outstanding Achievement in Sound Editing – Music Score and Musical for Episodic Long Form Broadcast Media is an annual award given by the Motion Picture Sound Editors. It honors sound editors whose work has warranted merit in the field of television; in this case, their work in the field of music editing in television. The awards title has gone through many incarnations since its inception, but its focus has been on honoring exemplary work of music editors. The term "long form" was added to the category in 2002, as long form television had been awarded under both the category titled Best Sound Editing – Television Movies of the Week – Music, and Best Sound Editing – Television Episodic – Music, or some moniker of them, since 1997 (with the exceptions of 2011 and 2015). The award has been given with its current title since 2018.

== Winners and nominees ==
=== 1990s ===
Year	Program	Episode(s)	Nominees	Network
1996	Best Sound Editing – Music – TV series			
1996	The Big Easy	"Don't Shoot the Piano Player"	Fernand Bos (music editor)	USA Network
1996	Dream On	"The Spirit of 76th & Park"	Merelyn Davis (music editor)	HBO
1996	Lois & Clark: The New Adventures of Superman	"Double Jeopardy"	Lisa A. Arpino (music editor)	ABC
1996	The Outer Limits	"Inconstant Moon"	Shawn Pierce (music editor)	Showtime
1996	Sliders	"Double Jeopardy"	Fernand Bos (music editor)	Fox
1996	The X-Files	"Syzygy"	Jeff Charbonneau (music editor)	Fox
1996	Best Sound Editing – Music – TV Films, Pilots, Miniseries			
1996	Gotti		Bill Abbott (supervising music editor)	HBO
1996	Crazy Horse		Virginia Ellsworth (music editor), William Ashford (assistant music editor), Robert Bayless (associate music editor)	TBS
1996	Her Last Chance		Lisa A. Arpino (music editor)	NBC
1996	In Cold Blood		Chris Ledesma (music editor), Bob Beecher (assistant music editor)	NBC
1997	Best Sound Editing – Television Episodic – Music			
1997	Fame L.A.	"Pilot"	Lisa A. Arpino (music/scoring editor)	Syndication
1997	Buffy the Vampire Slayer		Fernand Bos, Celia Weiner (music editors)	The WB
1997	Hercules: The Legendary Journeys		Philip Tallman (supervising music editor)	Syndication
1997	Stargate SG-1		Rick Chadock (music editor)	Showtime
1997	Best Sound Editing – Television Movies of the Week – Music			
1997	Holiday in Your Heart		Susan Mick (music editor), Frank Jones (re-recording mixer)	ABC
1997	Annabelle's Wish		Chris Ledesma (music editor), Bob Beecher (assistant music editor)	Fox
1997	Cinderella		Richard Ford (music editor)	ABC
1997	Friends 'Til the End		Lisa A. Arpino (music editor)	NBC
1997	Stargate SG-1	"Children of the Gods"	Alex Wilkinson (music editor)	Showtime
1997	Rescuers: Stories of Courage: Two Women		Chris Ledesma (music editor), Bob Beecher (assistant music editor)	Showtime
1997	Rose Hill		Chris Ledesma (music editor), Bob Beecher (assistant music editor)	CBS
1997	The Second Civil War		Chris Ledesma (music editor), Bob Beecher (assistant music editor)	HBO
1998	Best Sound Editing – Television Episodic – Music			
1998	The Drew Carey Show	"Drew's Dance Party Special"	Merelyn Davis (music editor)	ABC
1998	Ally McBeal		Sharyn Gersh (music editor)	Fox
1998	The X-Files		Jeff Charbonneau (music editor)	Fox
1998	Brimstone		David Bondelevitch (music editor)	Fox
1998	Buffy the Vampire Slayer		Fernand Bos (music editor)	The WB
1998	Fame L.A.		Lisa A. Arpino (music/scoring editor)	Syndication
1998	Hercules: The Legendary Journeys		Philip Tallman (supervising music editor)	Syndication
1998	Xena: Warrior Princess		Philip Tallman (supervising music editor)	Syndication
1998	Best Sound Editing – Television Mini-Series – Music			
1998	The Temptations	"Night One"	Tom Villano (music/scoring editor), Kevin Crehan (music editor)	NBC
1998	Mama Flora's Family		Michael T. Ryan (supervising music editor)	CBS
1998	A Will of Their Own		Lisa A. Arpino (music editor)	NBC
1998	Best Sound Editing – Television Movies of the Week – Music			
1998	The Rat Pack		Joanie Diener (music/scoring editor)	HBO
1998	The Christmas Wish		David J. Bondelevitch (music editor)	CBS
1998	Saint Maybe		Chris Ledesma (music editor), Bob Beecher (assistant music editor)	CBS
1998	My Own Country		Dean Hovey (music editor)	
1998	The Informant		Eduardo Ponsdomenech (music editor)	Showtime
1998	The Planet of Junior Brown		Gary Grey (scoring engineer)	Showtime
1998	Thanks of a Grateful Nation		Michael Baber, Dean Hovey (music editors)	Showtime
1998	The Wall		Larry Brown (music editor)	Showtime
1999	Best Sound Editing – Television Episodic – Music			
1999	The Sopranos	"A Hit Is a Hit"	Kathryn Dayak (music editor), Ron Evans (re-recording music mixer)	HBO
1999	Ally McBeal	"Seeing Green"	Sharyn Gersh (music/scoring editor)	Fox
1999	Angel	"I Will Remember You"	Fernand Bos (music/scoring editor), Tim Isle (music editor)	The WB
1999	Buffy the Vampire Slayer	"The Prom"	Fernand Bos (music/scoring editor)	The WB
1999	Cold Feet	"Pilot"	David Bondelevitch (music editor)	NBC
1999	Freaks and Geeks	"Beers and Weirs"	Jonathan Karp (music editor)	NBC
1999	The Famous Jett Jackson	"What Monet Can't Buy"	Carlos Lopes (music/scoring editor)	Disney
1999	The Hoop Life	"Road Trip"	Yuri Gorbachow, Chris Jannetta (music editors)	Showtime
1999	The Outer Limits	"Better Luck Next Time"	Richard S. Kaufman, Marc S. Perlman (music editors)	Showtime
1999	Best Sound Editing – Television Movies and Specials (including Mini-Series) – Music			
1999	Shake, Rattle and Roll: An American Love Story		Allan K. Rosen (supervising music editor); Robb Boyd (music editor); Charles Pollard (scoring mixer); Terry O'Bright, Keith Rogers (re-recording music mixers)	CBS
1999	Alice in Wonderland		Andrew Glen (music editor)	NBC
1999	Bartok the Magnificent		Paul Silver (music/scoring editor), Mark Server (music editor)	Fox
1999	Durango		Chris Ledesma (music editor)	CBS
1999	One Special Night		Ed Kalnins (music editor)	CBS
1999	Introducing Dorothy Dandridge		Kathy Durning, Chris McGeary (music/scoring editors)	HBO
1999	A Lesson Before Dying		Chris Ledesma (music editor)	HBO
1999	Witness Protection		Adam Kay (music/scoring editor)	HBO
1999	P.T. Barnum		Bob Beecher (music editor)	A&E
1999	Tuesdays with Morrie		Chris McGeary (music/scoring editor)	ABC

=== 2000s ===
Year	Program	Episode(s)	Nominees	Network
2000	Best Sound Editing – Television Episodic – Music			
2000	Ally McBeal	"The Musical, Almost"	Jennifer Barak, Sharyn Gersh (music editors)	Fox
2000	Bette	"The Color of Roses"	Chris Ledesma (music editor)	CBS
2000	Buffy the Vampire Slayer	"Superstar"	Fernand Bos (music/scoring editor)	The WB
2000	Queer as Folk	"Premiere"	Yuri Gorbachow (music editor)	Showtime
2000	The Sopranos	"Commendatori"	Kathryn Dayak (music editor)	HBO
2000	Undressed	"330"	Brian Bulman (music editor)	MTV
2000	Xena: Warrior Princess	"Coming Home"	Philip Tallman (supervising music editor)	Syndication
2000	Best Sound Editing – Television Movies and Specials (including Mini-Series) – Music			
2000	The Sandy Bottom Orchestra		Stephen M. Rowe (music/scoring editor, scoring mixer)	Showtime
2000	The Audrey Hepburn Story		Bob Beecher (music editor)	ABC
2000	Dark Prince: The True Story of Dracula		Steven A. Saltzman (music editor)	USA Network
2000	Deadly Appearances		Christopher Dedrick (music editor)	CTV
2000	Love and Murder		Christopher Dedrick (music editor)	CTV
2000	For All Time		Bob Beecher, Chris Ledesma (music editors)	CBS
2000	For Love or Country: The Arturo Sandoval Story		Georgiana Ramsland, Allan K. Rosen, Nicholas Viterelli (music editors)	HBO
2000	Hendrix		David Bondelevitch (music editor)	Showtime
2001	Best Sound Editing in Television – Music, Episodic Live Action			
2001	Buffy the Vampire Slayer	"Once More, with Feeling"	Fernand Bos (supervising music/scoring editor), Tim Isle (music editor)	UPN
2001	Ally McBeal	"Cloudy Skies, Chance Of Parade"	Sharyn Gersh (music editor)	Fox
2001	Angel	"Carpe Noctem"	Tim Isle (music editor)	The WB
2001	Smallville	"Pilot"	Chris McGeary (music editor)	The WB
2001	The Drew Carey Show	"Drew Carey's Back-to-School Rock 'n' Roll Comedy Hour"	Merelyn Davis, Suzanne Marie Eller, Gerry Rothschild (music editors)	ABC
2001	The Sopranos	"Mr. Ruggerio's Neighborhood"	Kathryn Dayak (music editor)	HBO
2001	That's Life	"Touched by a Biker"	Lisa A. Arpino (music editor)	CBS
2001	Undressed	"The Showdown"	Brian Bulman (music editor)	MTV
2001	Xena: Warrior Princess	"Old Ares Had a Farm"	Philip Tallman (music editor)	Syndication
2001	Best Sound Editing in Television – Music, Movies and Specials			
2001	Ruby's Bucket of Blood		David Bondelevitch (music editor)	Showtime
2001	A Colder Kind of Death		Amin Bhatia (music editor)	CTV
2001	Judgment		Gary Koftinoff (music editor)	CTV
2001	Dinner with Friends		Michael T. Ryan (music editor)	HBO
2001	Jett Jackson: The Movie		Lawrence Shragge (music editor)	Disney
2001	The Land Before Time VIII: The Big Freeze		Gregory Cathcart (music editor)	
2001	Life with Judy Garland: Me and My Shadows		Yuri Gorbachow, Jim Harrison (music editors)	ABC
2001	The Mists of Avalon		Allan K. Rosen (music editor)	TNT
2002	Best Sound Editing in Television Long Form – Music			
2002	Live from Baghdad		James Bladon, Bruno Roussel (music editors)	HBO
2002	Dinotopia		Alex Gibson, Jeremy Raub (music/scoring editors)	ABC
2002	Gleason		Christine H. Luethje (music editor)	CBS
2002	Martin and Lewis		Chris Ledesma (music editor)	CBS
2002	Johnson County War		David Bondelevitch (music editor)	Hallmark Channel
2002	A Nero Wolfe Mystery	"Death of a Doxy"	Kevin Banks (music editor), Richard Martinez (scoring editor)	A&E
2002	Roughing It		Ed Kalnins (music/scoring editor)	Hallmark
2002	The Stork Derby		David C. Burt (music editor)	
2003	The Music Man		Joanie Diener (supervising music editor, scoring editor)	ABC
2003	And Starring Pancho Villa as Himself		Allan K. Rosen, Nicholas Viterelli, Joshua Winget (music editors)	HBO
2003	Dreamkeeper		James Bellamy (music/scoring editor)	ABC
2003	Hitler: The Rise of Evil		Yuri Gorbachow, Craig Pettigrew (music editors)	CBS
2003	Wuthering Heights		Chris McGeary (music/scoring editor), Stuart Goetz (music editor)	MTV
2004	A Christmas Carol: The Musical		Joanie Diener (supervising music editor, scoring editor)	NBC
2004	The Mystery of Natalie Wood		Allan K. Rosen, Nicholas Viterelli (music editors)	ABC
2004	Meltdown		Shie Rozow (music editor)	Fox
2004	Rameses: Wrath of God or Man?		Christopher Kennedy (music editor)	Discovery Channel
2004	A Separate Peace		David Bondelevitch (music editor)	Showtime
2005	No Direction Home: Bob Dylan		Jennifer L. Dunnington, Annette Kudrak (music editors)	PBS
2005	CSI: Crime Scene Investigation	"Grave Danger"	Christine H. Luethje (music editor)	CBS
2005	Empire	"The Hunt", "Fortune's Fool"	Tom Villano (music editor)	ABC
2005	Trump Unauthorized		Yuri Gorbachow (music editor)	ABC
2005	The Triangle	"Episode 1"	Jason Ruder (music editor)	Sci Fi
2006	Best Sound Editing in Music for Television – Long Form			
2006	High School Musical		Carli Barber, Michael Dittrick (music editors)	Disney Channel
2006	The Lost Room		Christine H. Luethje (music editor)	Sci Fi
2006	The Ron Clark Story		Joanie Diener (music editor)	TNT
2006	The Cheetah Girls 2		Carli Barber (music editor)	Disney Channel
2006	Eight Days to Live		Robert Carli (music editor)	Lifetime
2006	The Ten Commandments		David Bondelevitch (music editor)	ABC
2007	Best Sound Editing – Music for Long Form Television			
2007	High School Musical 2		Michael Dittrick, Amber Funk (music editors)	Disney Channel
2007	Booky & the Secret Santa		Robert Carli (music editor)	CBC
2007	The War	"When Things Get Tough"	Jacob Ribicoff (music editor)	PBS
2008	Best Sound Editing – Long Form Music in Television			
2008	Céline		Kevin Banks (supervising music editor)	CBC
2008	Bernard and Doris		Ellen Segal (supervising music editor)	HBO
2008	A Raisin in the Sun		Joanie Diener (supervising music editor)	ABC
2009	Spectacular!		Michael Dittrick (supervising music editor), Ben Zales (music editor)	Nickelodeon
2009	Damages	"Trust Me"	Robert Cotnoir (music editor)	FX
2009	Diamonds		Kevin Banks (music editor)	ABC

=== 2010s ===
Year	Program	Episode(s)	Nominees	Network
2011	Magic Beyond Words: The J.K. Rowling Story		Michael T. Ryan (supervising music editor), Jeff Toyne (composer)	Lifetime
2011	12 Dates of Christmas		Lisa A. Arpino (supervising music editor), Avital Korin (music editor)	ABC Family
2011	Alphas	"Pilot"	Ben Zales (music editor)	Syfy
2011	Avalon High		Lisa A. Arpino (supervising music editor)	Disney Channel
2011	Terra Nova	"Occupation/Resistance"	Micha Liberman (supervising music editor), Gary L. Krause (music editor)	Fox
2012	Hemingway & Gellhorn		Joanie Diener (supervising music editor)	HBO
2012	Damages	"But You Don't Do That Anymore"	Robert Cotnoir (music editor)	FX
2012	Girl vs. Monster		Amber Funk (supervising music editor)	Disney Channel
2012	Hatfields & McCoys	"Part 2"	Kevin Banks, Darrell Hall (music editors)	History
2012	Titanic	"Episode 1"	Kevin Banks (music editor), Michael Banton-Jones (scoring editor)	ABC
2013	Best Sound Editing – Long Form Musical in Television			
2013	History of the Eagles		Annette Kudrak (music editor)	Showtime
2013	Smash	"The Nominations"/"The Tonys"	Robert Cotnoir, Dan Evans Farkas (music editor)	NBC
2013	Teen Beach Movie		Amber Funk (supervising music editor), Nathaniel Hill (music editor)	Disney Channel
2015	Best Sound Editing in Television- Long Form Music			
2015	Saints & Strangers		Del Spiva (music editor)	Nat Geo
2015	Scream Queens	"Pilot"/"Hell Week"	David Klotz (music editor)	Fox
2015	The Book of Negroes		Joe Mancuso (music editor)	BET
2015	Best Sound Editing in Television – Long Form: Musical			
2015	Teen Beach 2		Amber Funk (supervising music editor)	Disney Channel
2015	Drumline: A New Beat		Avital Korin (music editor)	VH1
2015	Descendants		Amber Funk (supervising music editor)	Disney Channel
2016	Best Sound Editing – Long Form Music in Television			
2016	The Rocky Horror Picture Show: Let's Do the Time Warp Again		Kevin Bassinson (music editor)	Fox
2016	The Get Down	"Where There Is Ruin, There Is Hope for a Treasure"	Jamieson Shaw (supervising music editor), Dave Robertson (music editor)	Netflix
2016	Gilmore Girls: A Year in the Life	"Summer"	Scott Schirle (music editor)	Netflix
2016	Quarry	"You Don't Miss Your Water"	Lodge Worster (music editor)	Cinemax
2016	Surviving Compton: Dre, Suge & Michel'le		Wolfgang Amadeus, Kevin Banks (music editors)	Lifetime
2017	Outstanding Achievement in Sound Editing – Music Score and Musical for Episodic Long Form Broadcast Media			
2017	The Get Down	"Only from Exile Can We Come Home"	Jamieson Shaw (supervising music editor); Jordan L. Ross, Dave Robertson (music editors)	Netflix
2017	Descendants 2		Amber Funk (supervising music editor), Richard David Brown (music editor)	Disney Channel
2017	Ozark		Bryant Fuhrmann, Jason Tregoe Newman (music editors)	Netflix
2017	Rebel	"Pilot"	Shie Rozow (music editor)	BET
2017	Vikings	"The Fisher King"	Yuri Gorbachow (supervising music editor), Lise Beauchesne (music editor)	History
2018	The Marvelous Mrs. Maisel	"We're Going to the Catskills!"	Annette Kudrak (music editor)	Amazon
2018	The Assassination of Gianni Versace: American Crime Story	"Manhunt"	David Klotz (music editor)	FX
2018	Counterpart	"Birds of a Feather"	Moira Marquis (music editor)	Starz
2018	The Handmaid's Tale	"The Word"	Yuri Gorbachow (supervising music editor), Lise Beauchesne (music editor)	Hulu
2018	The Little Drummer Girl	"Episode 3"	Andrew Glen (music editor)	AMC
2018	Westworld	"The Riddle of the Sphinx"	Christopher Kaller, Allegra De Souza (music editors)	HBO
2018	Luke Cage	"I Get Physical"	Michael Brake (music editor)	Netflix
2018	Ozark	"The Gold Coast"	Bryant Fuhrmann, Stephen Lotwis, Jason Tregoe Newman (music editors)	Netflix
2019	Game of Thrones	"The Long Night"	David Klotz (music editor)	HBO
2019	American Gods	"Donar the Great"	Kevin Banks (music editor)	Starz
2019	Billions	"Fight Night"	Shari Johanson (music editor)	Showtime
2019	Carnival Row	"The Gloaming"	Greg Vines (music editor)	Amazon
2019	Dark	"An Endless Cycle"	Lewis Morison (music editor)	Netflix
2019	The Handmaid's Tale	"Mayday"	Yuri Gorbachow (supervising music editor), Lise Beauchesne (music editor)	Hulu
2019	NOS4A2	"The Shorter Way"	Michael Brake (music editor)	AMC
2019	Succession	"This Is Not for Tears"	John Finklea, Todd Kasow (music editors)	HBO

=== 2020s ===
Year	Program	Episode(s)	Nominees	Network
2020	The Queen's Gambit	"Adjournment"	Tom Kramer (music editor)	Netflix
2020	Better Call Saul	"Magic Man"	Jason Tregoe Newman (music editor)	AMC
2020	The Boys	"Nothing Like It in the World"	Christopher Brooks (music editor)	Amazon
2020	Bridgerton	"Shock and Delight"	Brittany DuBay (music editor)	Netflix
2020	Ozark	"Kevin Cronin Was Here"	Stephen Lotwis, Jason Tregoe Newman (music editors)	Netflix
2020	Raised By Wolves	"Raised By Wolves"	James Bladon, David Menke, Lewis Morison (music editors)	HBO Max
2021	Best Sound Editing – Long Form Music in Television			
2021	Wu-Tang: An American Saga	"Protect Ya Neck"	Sebastian Zuleta (music editor)	Hulu
2021	Cobra Kai	"The Rise"	Andres Locsey (music editor)	Netflix
2021	The Witcher	"A Grain of Truth"	Arabella Winter (music editor)	Netflix
2021	Squid Game	"Red Light, Green Light"	Jae-il Jung (music editor)	Netflix
2021	See	"Rock-a-Bye"	Dan Farkas (music editor)	Apple TV+
2021	Ted Lasso	"Rainbow"	Richard David Brown (supervising music editor); Sharyn Gersh (music editor)	Apple TV+
2021	Star Trek: Discovery	"Kobayashi Maru"	Moira Marquis (supervising music editor); Matea Prljevic (scoring editor)	Paramount+
2022	Outstanding Achievement in Music Editing – Broadcast Long Form			
2022	Stranger Things	"Chapter Nine: The Piggyback"	Lena Glikson, David Klotz (music editor)	Netflix
2022	The L Word: Generation Q	"Questions for the Universe"	Sharyn Gersh (supervising music editor)	Showtime
2022	The Lord of the Rings: The Rings of Power	"Alloyed"	Jason Smith, Michael Baber (music editors)	Prime Video
2022	Severance	"The We We Are"	Missy Cohen, Sam Zeines (music editors); Felipe Pacheco (scoring editor)	Apple TV+
2022	Wednesday	"A Murder of Woes"	Michael T. Ryan (music editor)	Netflix
2022	The White Lotus	"Bull Elephants"	Mikael Sandgren (supervising music editor)	HBO
