= List of Peabody Award winners (2010–2019) =

The following is a list of George Foster Peabody Award winners and honorable mentions during the decade of the 2010s.

== 2010 ==
Recipient	Area of Excellence
FX Productions and Sony Pictures Television	Justified
WNET/New York, NY and Illuminations Television Ltd.	Great Performances: Macbeth
CNN	Award for coverage of the Deepwater Horizon oil spill
WNYC/New York, NY	Radiolab, hightlighting the episodes Lucy and Words
Playtone, DreamWorks Productions, and HBO	The Pacific
Magic Hour Films, WG Film, Mediamente, Kamoli Films, Danish Film Institute, DR TV, and HBO	Burma VJ
Mentorn, Antony Thomas Productions, and HBO	For Neda, about the death of Neda Agha-Soltan
Loki Films and HBO	12th & Delaware
40 Acres & A Mule Filmworks and HBO	If God Is Willing and da Creek Don't Rise
Ruby Films, Gerson Saines Productions, and HBO Films	Temple Grandin
HBO Sports	Magic & Bird: A Courtship of Rivals
Hartswood Films, BBC Cymru Wales, and Masterpiece	Sherlock, for the episode "A Study in Pink"
WGCU Public Media/Fort Myers, FL	Lucia's Letter, a documentary produced by Amy Tardif about young women enslaved as drug smugglers
WNET's American Masters, Two Lefts Don't Make a Right, and Dakota Group	LennoNYC
TNT	Men of a Certain Age
WFAA-TV/Dallas, TX	"Bitter Lessons", an investigation by Byron Harris into government-funded career schools
Rezolution Pictures, National Film Board of Canada, CBC News Network, ARTE, Documentary Channel Canada, Radio Canada, ARTV, Knowledge Network, APTN, AVRO, and ITVS	Independent Lens, for Reel Injun: On the Trail of the Hollywood Indian
Launch Minneapolis and American Public Media	The Promised Land with host Majora Carter
NPR	Award for coverage by Julie McCarthy of military conflict, flooding, and social issues in Pakistan
NPR	Award for an investigation by Joseph Shapiro, working with Kristen Lombardi and Kristin Jones of the Center for Public Integrity, into low levels of consequence faced by campus rape perpetrators
NPR	"Behind the Bail Bond System", an investigation by Laura Sullivan airing on All Things Considered and Morning Edition
Youth Radio, NPR, and Huffington Post	All Things Considered, for "Trafficked: A Youth Radio Investigation", reported by Youth Radio's Denise Tejada (parts one and two)
Science Channel and BBC	Wonders of the Solar System with Brian Cox
True Vision (airing on BBC Four)	Zimbabwe's Forgotten Children, produced by Xoliswa Sithole and directed by Jezza Neumann
TeenNick and Ncredible productions	Degrassi: The Next Generation, for the episode "My Body Is a Cage"
C-SPAN	C-SPAN Video Library
American Experience	My Lai
The Moth, Public Radio Exchange, and Atlantic Public Media	The Moth Radio Hour
Sikelia Productions, Far Hills Pictures, and American Masters	Elia Kazan: A Letter to Elia
Art21, Inc. (airing on PBS)	William Kentridge: Anything Is Possible, a documentary on William Kentridge directed by Susan Sollins and Charles Atlas
ESPN	30 for 30
American Documentary, POV, and ITVS	The Most Dangerous Man in America: Daniel Ellsberg and the Pentagon Papers
Phoenix Satellite Television (airing on Phoenix InfoNews Channel)	"Report on a New Generation of Migrant Workers in China"
WTHR/Indianapolis, IN	"Reality Check: Where Are the Jobs?" an investigation by Bob Segall into job creation claims by the Indiana Economic Development Corporation
Jay Rosenstein Productions (for WILL-TV/Urbana, IL, aired on PBS)	The Lord Is Not On Trial Here Today, a documentary on Vashti McCollum
washingtonpost.com	"The Cost of War: Traumatic Brain Injury; Coming Home a Different Person", reported by Christian Davenport and Whitney Shefte
KSTP-TV/Saint Paul, MN	"Who Killed Doc?" an investigation by Mark Albert into how a Minnesota sailor's death in Iraq was ill-explained
Frontline and Mongoose Pictures	Frontline, for The Wounded Platoon (directed by Dan Edge), which examined the effects of post-traumatic stress among a platoon of Iraq War veterans
Scott Free Productions, King Size Productions, Small Wishes, and CBS Productions	The Good Wife

== 2011 ==
Recipient	Area of Excellence
CNN	Award for work by Fareed Zakaria, citing his GPS analysis on Iran and the special Restoring the American Dream: Fixing Education
CNN	Award for coverage of the Arab Spring uprisings, highlighting the reporting of Nic Robertson, Sara Sidner, Ivan Watson, and Ben Wedeman
NPR	Award for reports by Lourdes Garcia-Navarro on the Arab Spring uprisings
NPR	"Native Foster Care: Lost Children, Shattered Families", a 3-part report by Laura Sullivan on the illegal practice by 33 states of separating Native American children from their families or tribes
StoryCorps, NPR, POV, and National September 11 Memorial & Museum	StoryCorps recollections of the September 11 terrorist attacks on Morning Edition and YouTube (Michael Garofalo, lead producer; films directed by Mike Rauch and Timothy Rauch; radio story reported by Audie Cornish)
Al Jazeera English	Coverage of "The Arab Awakening", highlighting Bahrain: Shouting in the Dark
TED.com	Award to the website for "[making] creative thinkers and their ideas available everywhere, anytime"
American Experience in association with Apograph Productions, Firelight Media and Q-Ball Productions (presented on PBS)	American Experience, for the documentaries "Triangle Fire" (directed by Jamila Wignot), "Freedom Riders", and "Stonewall Uprising"
American Documentary/POV/Red Square Productions, Bungalow Town Productions, ITVS International in association with YLE	POV, for My Perestroika
Hello Doggie Inc., Busboy Productions, Spartina Productions, and Comedy Central	The Colbert Report, for its segments on Super PAC funding of political campaigns
CNN and Done & Dusted (aka Fun & Trusted)	CNN Heroes: An All-Star Tribute
BBC1	Somalia: Land of Anarchy, reported by Peter Greste, aired on Panorama
BBC.com	Awarded in recognition of the website's "immediate, evolving coverage of news events great and small"
Loud Mouth Films, Limited, and Independent Television Service (airing on KBDI/Denver, CO and other NETA stations)	Who Killed Chea Vichea? a documentary about the death of the Cambodian labor leader directed by Bradley Cox
Television Broadcasts Limited (TVB Jade)	News Magazine, for the reports "People's Republic of Cheating" (probes of academic plagiarism, produced by Yung Chun-Fai) and "Misjudged Cases" (probes of unjust arrests and prosecutions, produced by Hui Siu-Fun)
Showtime Presents, Teakwood Lane Productions, Cherry Pie Productions, Keshet, and Fox 21	Homeland
Fuji Television	The Untold Stories of the Tsunami in Japan, produced by Takanori Ohno and directed by Sakiko Miyashita
The New Yorker and Human Rights Watch	Awards for the online reports "Acting Up: Russia's Civil Society" (documenting Russian dissidents, produced by Veronica Matushaj with photography by Platon) and "Gold's Costly Dividend: The Porgera Joint Venture" (report on abuse by security at a Papua New Guinea mine, produced by Veronica Matushaj and Francisco Fagan and reported by Chris Albin-Lackey)
Clover and A Bee Films and 33&Out, Inc. in association with HBO Documentary Films	Earth Made of Glass
Independent Lens and Bhutto Film, LLC	Bhutto
Blown Deadline Productions in association with HBO Entertainment	Treme
Broadway Video and IFC	Portlandia
KING-TV/Seattle, WA	"Their Crime, Your Dime", an investigation by Chris Ingalls of food stamp and welfare scams
Universal Television, Deedle-Dee Productions and Fremulon	Parks and Recreation
KPHO-TV/Phoenix, AZ	"Toxic Secrets", a report by Tammy Leitner on the effects of buried Agent Orange drums at a US Army base in South Korea
Showtime Presents	Rebirth
Bighead, Littlehead, 360 Television, Grok and Generator Productions in association with HBO Entertainment	Game of Thrones
CBS News	Undercover reports by Clarissa Ward on the uprising within Syria, airing on CBS Evening News
KLAS-TV/Las Vegas, NV	"Desert Underwater", a series of reports by George Knapp and Colleen McCarty on the housing crisis in Las Vegas and its effects
NHK	Surviving the Tsunami, with reporting from Kenichi Nakamaru and Shu Morino (later aired as an episode of PBS' Nova)
WEWS-TV/Cleveland, OH	"Operation Deep Freeze", a report by Ron Regan on United States Navy personnel exposed to radiation at a base in Antarctica
Quest Productions, Bread and Butter Films in association with Thirteen's American Masters for WNET/New York, NY	Charles and Ray Eames – The Architect and the Painter
Public Television Service and IFA	A Year in the Clouds, a documentary about the Atayal people directed by Dean Johnson and Frank Smith
ABC News	20/20, for the report "Peace Corps – A Trust Betrayed", an exposé by Brian Ross of a murder and sexual assaults — and related cover-ups — involving the humanitarian program's operations in Africa
GlobalPost.com	Award for the website's On Location posts
Johns Hopkins Health and Education South Africa, Curious Pictures Pty Ltd, Ants Multimedia, SABC Education (airing on SABC 1)	Intersexions, a drama about the transmission of HIV/AIDS
Austin City Limits (KLRU-TV/Austin, TX and PBS)	Institutional Award for the live music performance program
Sony Pictures Television	Jeopardy!

== 2012 ==
Recipient	Area of Excellence
JUF Pictures, Inc. and documentary	Under Fire: Journalists in Combat, directed by Martyn Burke
Steps International, BBC, DR-Danish Broadcast Corp.	Why Poverty?, a series of eight films (Welcome to the World (directed by Brian Hill), Park Avenue: Money, Power & the American Dream, Give Us the Money, Land Rush (directed by Hugo Berkley & Osvalde Lewat), Poor Us: An Animated History of Poverty (directed by Ben Lewis, Stealing Africa (directed by Christoffer Guldbrandsen), Education Education (directed by Weijun Chen), and Solar Mamas)
1895 Films for Smithsonian Channel	MLK: The Assassination Tapes, directed by Tom Jennings
GMA Network, Inc. (GMA News TV)	Reel Time: Salat (Bone Dry), directed by Aaron Mendoza
Al Jazeera, Just Vision	Sheikh Jarrah, My Neighborhood, directed by Julia Bacha and Rebekah Wingert-Jabi
Augusta Films and HBO Documentary Films, with the support of the National Endowment for the Humanities	The Loving Story, directed by Nancy Buirski
Show of Force, Mudpuppy Films and HBO Documentary Films	Marina Abramović: The Artist is Present, directed by Matthew Akers
ITN Productions for Channel 4	Sri Lanka's Killing Fields: War Crimes Unpunished
ITV Studios (airing on ITV)	Exposure: The Other Side of Jimmy Savile, researched and presented by Mark Williams-Thomas
Hardcash Productions/Fuuse Films (airing on ITV)	Exposure: Banaz: An Honour Killing.
Brook Lapping Productions, National Geographic Channel (also airing on BBC Two)	Putin, Russia and the West
True-Walker Productions, Independent Television Service (airing on PBS)	Independent Lens: Summer Pasture
KNXV-TV/Phoenix, AZ	"Ford Escape: Exposing a Deadly Defect", an investigation by Joe Ducey that revealed an acceleration problem in the vehicle in question
60 Minutes (CBS News)	"Deception at Duke", an investigation by Scott Pelley into an experimental cancer treatment by Anil Potti at Duke University
60 Minutes (CBS News)	"Joy in the Congo", a profile by Bob Simon of Orchestre Symphonique Kimbanguiste
ABC News	Coverage of Hurricane Sandy
ABC News	"Robin's Journey", a public service campaign centered on Good Morning America co-anchor Robin Roberts' bone marrow transplant
WTHR-TV/Indianapolis, IN	"Investigating the IRS", an examination by Bob Segall of how illegal immigrants bilked Internal Revenue Service in tax refunds
KMGH-TV/Denver, CO	"Investigating the Fire", an examination by Amanda Kost and Marshall Zelinger of a controlled burn by the Colorado State Forest Service and its deadly impact
Univision	Award for the network's reports from Jorge Ramos, Gerardo Reyes, María Antonieta Collins, Tifani Roberts, and Mariana Atencio on "Rapido y Furioso" (Operation Fast and Furious)
WVIT-TV/New Britain, CT	Award for the station's breaking news coverage of the Sandy Hook Elementary School shooting, anchored by Brad Drazen, Shirley Chan, Lisa Carberg, Keisha Grant, and Gerry Brooks
NPR	Coverage by reporters Kelly McEvers and Deborah Amos on the crisis in Syria
CNN	Coverage of the unrest in Syria and Homs
John Wells Productions and Warner Brothers Television	Southland
Prodco, Inc. in association with ABC Family	Switched at Birth
Comedy Central and Five Timz Productions	D.L. Hughley: The Endangered List
HBO	Real Sports with Bryant Gumbel
Playtone Productions and Everyman Pictures in association with HBO Films	Game Change
Pig Newton, Inc., FX Productions	Louie
Aptow Prod and I am Jenni Konner Productions in association with HBO Entertainment	Girls
Radio Diaries	"Teen Contender", a profile (produced by Joe Richman, Sue Jaye Johnson, and Samara Freemark and airing on NPR's All Things Considered) of 16-year-old Claressa Shields and her quest to earn a spot on the 2012 US Olympic Women's boxing team
WBEZ/Chicago, IL, ProPublica, Fundacion MEPI	This American Life, for the documentary "What Happened at Dos Erres", a profile by Habiba Nosheen of a child survivor of the 1982 Guatemalan civil war
Media Mechanics, Ben Manilla Productions, Studio 360, The Library of Congress (airing on WNYC/New York, NY and Public Radio International)	Inside the National Recording Registry
WNYC/New York, NY	The Leonard Lopate Show
SCOTUSblog	Award to the website and its coverage of the United States Supreme Court
NYTimes.com	"Snow Fall: The Avalanche at Tunnel Creek", an online multimedia report on a deadly avalanche
NHK Educational Corporation for NHK (airing on NHK Educational Channel)	Design Ah!
Lorne Michaels	Individual Award to "the patron saint of satirical television comedy"
BBC Cymru Wales	Institutional Award for Doctor Who
ITV Studios	Institutional Award for Michael Apted's Up Series

== 2013 ==
Recipient	Area of Excellence
National Black Programming Consortium, Corporation for Public Broadcasting, and PBS	180 Days: A Year Inside an American High School, a documentary produced by Garland McLaurin and Lesley Norman and directed by Jacquie Jones and McLaurin about Washington Metropolitan High School, an alternative high school in the District of Columbia Public Schools
WBEZ/Chicago, IL	This American Life, for "Harper High School" (part one and part two), which profiled life at a Chicago high school plagued by gun violence (reported by Linda Lutton, Alex Kotlowitz, and Ben Calhoun)
Thirteen, Inkwell Films, and Kunhardt McGee Productions in association with Ark Media	The African Americans: Many Rivers to Cross with Henry Louis Gates Jr.
Florentine Films and WETA-TV/Washington, DC	The Central Park Five
WETA-TV/Washington, DC, Latino Public Broadcasting, Bosch & Company, and Independent Television Service	Latino Americans: The 500 Year Legacy That Reshaped a Nation, a documentary series produced by Adriana Bosch
CNN and Zero Point Zero Production, Inc.	Anthony Bourdain: Parts Unknown
American Documentary/POV	The Law in These Parts
American Documentary/POV and BKS Films, LLC	Best Kept Secret
WBZ Radio and WBZ-TV/Boston, MA	Joint honor for the stations' coverage of the Boston Marathon bombing and subsequent investigation and manhunt
GMA Networks, Inc.	Award for coverage of Typhoon Haiyan (aka Typhoon Yolanda)
BBC World News America	"Inside Syria’s War", with reporting from Ian Pannell, Paul Wood, Lyse Doucet, and Jeremy Bowen
CBS This Morning (CBS News)	Award for Charlie Rose's "polite but persistent" interview with Syrian President Bashar al-Assad
Al Jazeera America	Fault Lines, for "Haiti in a Time of Cholera", an examination by Sebastian Walker into the Cholera outbreak in the earthquake-ravaged country and its possible source
Al Jazeera America	Fault Lines, for "Made in Bangladesh", a report by Anjali Kamat which probed the Rana Plaza collapse and how American retailers turned a blind eye toward dangerous practices by clothing subcontractors
Frontline and Kirk Documentary Group	Frontline, for League of Denial: The NFL's Concussion Crisis
ESPN	Outside the Lines, for "NFL at a Crossroads: Investigating a Health Crisis", featuring reporting from Steve Fainaru, Mark Fainaru-Wada, John Barr, and Steve Delsohn
KING-TV/Seattle, WA	"Hanford's Dirty Secrets", an investigation by Susannah Frame which revealed nuclear waste leaks and mismanagement at the Hanford Site
WTVF/Nashville, TN	"Questions of Influence", a series of reports and a primetime special from Phil Williams and Ben Hall revealing Tennessee state officials’ involvement in shady business deals
WVUE-DT/New Orleans, LA and The Times-Picayune (NOLA.com)	"Louisiana Purchased", an investigation by Lee Zurik, Manuel Torres, and Lauren McGaughy into campaign financing in Louisiana
The Center for Investigative Reporting and Public Radio Exchange	Reveal, for "The VA's Opiate Overload", which examined overdoses from prescription opiates at Veterans Administration hospitals (Aaron Glantz, reporter)
NBC News	"In Plain Sight: Poverty in America", an on-air and online assessment of the faces and forms of poverty
Hollow Interactive, LLC	Hollow: An Interactive Documentary, a documentary directed by Elaine McMillion
How to Survive a Plague LLC, Public Square Films, Impact Partners, and Little Punk	Independent Lens for How to Survive a Plague
Charlotte Street Films, Independent Television Service, BBC, ZDF/Arte, and NHK	Independent Lens, for The House I Live In
Chain Camera Productions, Independent Television Service, Girls Club Entertainment, RISE films, Fork Films, Cuomo Cole Productions, and Canal+	Independent Lens, for The Invisible War
DR and U.S. presenting station Link TV	Borgen
Sony Pictures Television	Breaking Bad
Shine America and FX Productions	The Bridge
Kudos and Imaginary Friends (co-production)	Broadchurch
Unicorn Black	Burka Avenger
ABC Studios	Scandal
Donen/Fincher/Roth, Trigger Street Productions, Inc., Media Rights Capital, and Netflix	House of Cards
Lionsgate Television and Netflix	Orange Is the New Black
Markay Media in association with South Carolina ETV	A Chef's Life
Comedy Central Productions	Key & Peele
Temple Street Productions in association with BBC America and Space	Orphan Black
Haut et Court TV, Canal+, Jimmy, Ciné+, and Backup Films	The Returned (Les Revenants)
HBO Documentary Films and Fine Films LLC	Life According to Sam
HBO Documentary Films and Sabella Entertainment	Six by Sondheim
Jigsaw Productions, HBO Documentary Films, Wider Film Projects, and Below the Radar Films	Mea Maxima Culpa: Silence in the House of God
Samantha Stendal and Aaron Blanton	"A Needed Response", a viral video (the first to earn a Peabody) created by the University of Oregon students to challenge the culture of rape and sexual assault on college campuses
The Race Card Project (NPR News and Morning Edition)	Award for the Michele Norris-led project that examines listeners' ideas and experiences on race, pride, prejudice and identity
The New York Times and National Film Board of Canada	A Short History of the Highrise, an online "visual tour of 'vertical living'"
B'way Films LLC, Ghost Light Films, Albert M. Tapper and WNET/New York, NY	Great Performances, for Broadway Musicals: A Jewish Legacy, directed by Michael Kantor
TCM (accepted by host Robert Osborne)	The Story of Film: An Odyssey
Tom Brokaw	Personal award to the longtime NBC News personality and former Nightly News anchor for his various projects and books (e.g. The Greatest Generation)

== 2014 ==
Note: With the 2014 honorees, Peabody Award organizers began a practice of announcing each year's recipients by category rather than presenting them en masse.

Recipient	Area of Excellence
Personal and institutional honorees
Afropop Worldwide	Institutional Award to the PRI radio series for its celebration of African and Afro-inspired music
David Attenborough	Personal Award for Attenborough's work as host and producer of nature-history programs
Entertainment honorees
Zeppotron and Channel 4	Black Mirror
MGM Television and FX Productions	Fargo
Fox Television Studios and FX Productions	The Americans
Jax Media	Inside Amy Schumer
Eye Productions, CBS Television Studios, Warner Bros. Entertainment, Electus, RCTV, and Poppy Productions	Jane the Virgin
HBO Entertainment in association with Sixteen String Jack Productions and Avalon Television	Last Week Tonight with John Oliver
Gran Via Productions and Zip Works	Rectify
SundanceTV, BBC Worldwide, Drama Republic, and Eight Rooks Productions	The Honourable Woman
Cinemax Entertainment in association with Ambeg Productions, Anonymous Content and Extension 765	The Knick
News, radio, and podcast honorees
CNN	"Crisis at the VA", an investigation into delays in care at US Department of Veterans Affairs hospitals
CNN	Award for coverage of the kidnapping of schoolgirls by the Boko Haram terrorist organization in Chibok, Nigeria
NBC News and MSNBC	Award for coverage on the rise of the Islamic State, in particular reports by correspondent Richard Engel
Vice News	Award for reports by Medyan Dairieh inside the caliphate of the Islamic State
Vice News	Last Chance High, a series of web reports and podcasts profiling troubled students at Chicago's Montefiore Therapeutic Day School
NPR	Award for on-scene reports from the Ebola virus epidemic in West Africa
Futuro Media Group, Round Earth Media, Radio Progreso, and Freelance Producers (airing on NPR)	Latino USA, for "Gangs, Murder, and Migration in Honduras", which examined the motivations behind the exodus of Hondurans to the United States
State of the Re:Union and WJCT-FM/Jacksonville, FL (distributed by NPR and PRX)	State of the Re:Union
Minnesota Public Radio News	Betrayed by Silence, a documentary examining the child sex-abuse scandal involving the Archdiocese of Saint Paul and Minneapolis
WNYC/New York, NY	Radiolab, for "60 Words", a collaboration with BuzzFeed examining the Authorization for Use of Military Force Against Terrorists and its serving as the legal foundation for the war on terror
WNYC/New York, NY and New Jersey Public Radio	"Chris Christie, White House Ambitions and the Abuse of Power", a series of reports linking closures on the George Washington Bridge to operations within the New Jersey governor's administration
KVUE/Austin, TX	"The Cost of Troubled Minds", an investigation examining the monetary and psychological effects of cutbacks in Texas mental health care programs
Serial, This American Life, and Chicago Public Media	Serial, for its investigation of the killing of Hae Min Lee
E. W. Scripps Company Washington, DC bureau	"Under the Radar", a series of reports investigating loopholes that allow sex offenders convicted in the US Military to go unidentified and unmonitored when returning to civilian life
Documentary, public service, educational, and children’s programming honorees
American Experience Films, WGBH Educational Foundation, and Firelight Films	American Experience, for "Freedom Summer"
ITN Productions	Children on the Frontline, a documentary airing on Channel 4's Dispatches profiling 5 children impacted by the Syrian Civil War
Flying Cloud Productions, Inc.	Human Harvest: China's Illegal Organ Trade
Brakeless LTD, Bungalow Town Productions, BBC, NHK, IKON, DR, and Independent Television Service (airing on PBS)	Independent Lens, for "Brakeless"
Jigsaw Productions, Jagged Films, and Inaudible Films in association with HBO Documentary Films	Mr. Dynamite: The Rise of James Brown
Covert Productions in association with HBO Documentary Films and Impact Partners	The Newburgh Sting
American Documentary/POV	POV, for American Revolutionary: The Evolution of Grace Lee Boggs
Ginzberg Productions (Abby Ginzberg) (airing on SABC 2, DStv, and GOtv)	Soft Vengeance: Albie Sachs and the New South Africa
FRONTLINE in association with Kirk Documentary Group and Rain Media	United States of Secrets, a documentary airing on PBS' Frontline examining the growth of US Government surveillance efforts post-9/11
Grain Media (broadcast through Netflix)	Virunga
BBC World Service	Award for the broadcaster's public service efforts to inform about the Ebola virus epidemic in West Africa
Noticias Univision	Entre el Abandono y el Rechazo (Between Abandonment and Rejection), which dealt with unaccompanied Latin American children seeking asylum in the United States
Fuzzy Door Productions and Cosmos Studios, Inc. in associations with Fox Broadcasting Company and National Geographic Channel	Cosmos: A Spacetime Odyssey
Cartoon Network Studios	Adventure Time
Brown Bag Films and Disney Junior	Doc McStuffins

== 2015 ==
Note: Beginning in 2015, two notable changes were made in the Peabody Awards process:

- The in-advance announcement of finalists, from which the main juror panel would cull a list of formal award winners — "The Peabody 30". Personal, institutional, and career achievement honorees do not count toward the "30" list.
- The introduction of the Futures of Media Awards, which highlight outstanding narratives and innovations in digital-based storytelling. Futures of Media Award recipients are determined by a separate jury of Peabody program honor students at the University of Georgia's Grady College of Journalism and Mass Communication.

Recipient	Area of excellence
Personal and institutional honorees
David Letterman	Personal Award in recognition of Letterman's 33-year tenure as a late-night TV host
Stanley Nelson Jr.	Personal Award for Nelson's work as a documentary filmmaker and as founder of Firelight Media
The Daily Show with Jon Stewart	Institutional Award for the show's "lasting impact on political satire, television comedy and even politics itself."
News, radio, podcast, public service, and web honorees
PBS NewsHour (PBS and WETA-TV/Washington, D.C.)	"Desperate Journey", a series of reports on those fleeing Syria and other war-torn areas of the Middle East
WXIA-TV/Atlanta, GA	"911: Lost on the Line", an investigation revealing government oversights and technical shortcomings in smart phones and telecommunications infrastructure, which led to needless deaths across the country
WTAE-TV/Pittsburgh, PA	"Burning Questions", an investigation into response inefficiencies in Pennsylvania volunteer fire departments
WMAQ-TV/Chicago, IL	Award for an investigation uncovering procedural infractions and disinformation from the Chicago Police Department regarding the murder of Laquan McDonald
HBO	Real Sports with Bryant Gumbel, for "The Killing Fields", a report examining Africa's illegal ivory trade
NPR News	Award for a report on the U.S. Army's testing of mustard gas on soldiers during World War II
This American Life	Award for three episodes ("Three Miles" and "The Problem We All Live With", parts one and two) examining the benefits and effects of school desegregation
WQXR-FM/New York, NY	Meet the Composer
BBC	Public Service recognition for the broadcaster's coverage of the European migrant crisis
Upian, National Film Board of Canada, Arte, Bayerischer Rundfunk, and CBC/Radio-Canada	Do Not Track, an online interactive documentary examining Internet economic and privacy issues
Entertainment and children's programming honorees
ABC Studios	black-ish
Marvel Television in association with ABC Studios for Netflix	Marvel's Jessica Jones
Red Crown Productions, Participant Media, Come What May Productions, and New Balloon (Distributed by Netflix)	Beasts of No Nation
Universal Television, Oh Brudder Productions, Alan Yang Productions, and Fremulon (Distributed by Netflix)	Master of None
Universal Cable Productions	Mr. Robot
FremantleMedia International and Kino Lorber	Deutschland 83
HBO Entertainment and Warner Bros. Television in association with Damon Lindelof Productions and Film 44	The Leftovers
Amazon Studios	Transparent
A+E Studios	UnREAL
Playground Entertainment and Company Pictures for BBC and Masterpiece in association with BBC Worldwide, Altus Media and Prescience	Wolf Hall
Move on Up (Airing on CBeebies)	Katie Morag
Documentary and educational honorees
HBO Documentary Films in association with Sky Atlantic and Jigsaw Productions	Going Clear: Scientology and the Prison of Belief
HBO Documentary Films in association with Gidalya Pictures and Blumhouse Productions	How to Dance in Ohio
HBO Documentary Films in association with Good Things Acquisition Company	The Jinx: The Life and Deaths of Robert Durst
Spring Films, Angel TV, and Ratpac Documentary Films in association with HBO Documentary Films	Night Will Fall
Assassin Films, BBC Storyville, UK-INDIA, and Tathagat Films in association with Gamini Plyatissa Foundation, Vital Voices Global Partnership, DR, Plus Pictures Aps, CBC News Network, SVT, IKON, RTS, SRF, and RAI	Independent Lens, for India's Daughter
Frontline (PBS and WGBH-TV/Boston, MA)	Frontline, for ISIS in Afghanistan
Showtime Documentary Films, Passion Pictures, and Cutler Productions	Listen to Me Marlon
Portret Films, American Documentary, POV, and Independent Television Service in association with Latino Public Broadcasting with major funding from Corporation for Public Broadcasting	POV, for Don't Tell Anyone (No Le Digas a Nadie)
RadicalMedia in association with Moxie Firecracker for Netflix	What Happened, Miss Simone?
Peabody-Facebook Futures of Media Award Honorees
PBS and WGBH-TV/Boston, MA	Frontline, for Ebola Outbreak, a virtual reality examination of the Ebola crisis
PBS and WGBH-TV/Boston, MA	Frontline, for Inheritance, an interactive documentary that examines one's legacy through the items they leave behind
Sweet 180 Productions	Halal in the Family
Dontnod Entertainment	Life Is Strange
St. Louis Public Radio	One Year in Ferguson

== 2016 ==
Recipient	Area of excellence
Personal and institutional honorees
Norman Lear	Personal Award for Lear's groundbreaking work as a situation comedy producer
Independent Television Service	Institutional Award for ITVS' funding and presenting of documentary films on public television
Documentary honorees
The New York Times Op-Docs (NYTimes.com)	4.1 Miles
PBS and WGBH-TV/Boston, MA	Frontline, for "Exodus," which offered first-person accounts of migrants fleeing war and persecution for safety in Europe
PBS and WGBH-TV/Boston, MA	Frontline, for "Confronting ISIS," an examination of America's ongoing war against Islamist extremists
American Documentary, Inc. (Airing on PBS)	POV, for Hooligan Sparrow
Trilogy Films LLC Bigmouth Productions, Cedar Creek Productions and the Independent Television Service (Airing on PBS)	Independent Lens, for Trapped
AfterImage Public Media in association with Actual Films (Distributed through Netflix)	Audrie & Daisy
Forward Movement LLC and Kandoo Films (Distributed through Netflix)	13th
Banger Films (Distributed through Netflix and airing on HBO Canada)	Hip-Hop Evolution
Film First and HBO Documentary Films	Mavis!
ESPN Films and Laylow Films	O.J.: Made in America
Deborah S. Esquenazi Productions, LLC (Airing on Investigation Discovery)	Southwest of Salem: The Story of the San Antonio Four
Magnolia Pictures and Participant Media in association with Showtime Documentary Films and Global Produce/Jigsaw Productions	Zero Days
Entertainment honorees
FX Productions	Atlanta
FX Productions	Better Things
HBO Entertainment	Veep
HBO Entertainment in association with Parkwood Entertainment	Lemonade
BBC One and Netflix	Happy Valley
Pig Newton Inc. and Hulu	Horace and Pete
The Forge, Channel 4, and Hulu	National Treasure
News, radio, podcast, public service, and web honorees
WTHR/Indianapolis, IN	"Charity Caught on Camera," an investigation into mismanagement and unsafe conditions at the Grant County Rescue Mission
WTHR/Indianapolis, IN	"Dangerous Exposure," which revealed how an Indiana environmental watchdog agency turned a blind eye toward the poisoning of residential groundwater while shielding guilty companies from consequences and cleanup
KNTV/San Jose, CA	"Arrested at School," an investigation into how Bay Area school districts rely on law enforcement as a means of student discipline
CNN	Award for the reports "ISIS in Iraq and Syria," "Undercover in Syria," and "Battle for Mosul"
CBS Evening News with Scott Pelley (CBS)	Award for Jim Axelrod's investigation into West Virginia's opioid epidemic
Just Not Sports & One Tree Forest Films	"#MoreThanMean," an online video putting faces to the issue of online harassment against women in sports
American Public Media	In the Dark, for its examination of the Jacob Wetterling kidnapping case
Panoply Media	The Unexplainable Disappearance of Mars Patel
This American Life and PBC in collaboration with The Marshall Project and ProPublica	This American Life, for "Anatomy of Doubt," which examined how and why a rape victim's claims were dismissed as fake
NPR	Award for reports on how a ravenous sales culture within Wells Fargo led to the creation of fake consumer banking accounts and the blacklisting of those who attempted to report the unethical practice
ProPublica and The Texas Tribune	"Hell and High Water," a multimedia collaboration examining Houston's vulnerability to dangerous flooding
Peabody-Facebook Futures of Media Award Honorees
The Atlanta Journal-Constitution	Doctors & Sex Abuse a Digital Journalism series on how doctors who sexually violate patients are allowed to continue practicing medicine.
Amnesty International and Forensic Architecture	Saydnaya, an Interactive Documentary feature documenting torture in Syrian prisons.
Small Bang Studio, France Télévisions Nouvelles Ecritures, and Oikos Agency with the participation of the Centre national du Cinéma et de l'image animée	Phallaina, a graphic novel designed for mobile devices
Numinous Games	Award for the video game That Dragon, Cancer
Google Spotlight Stories with Evil Eye Pictures	Pearl, a virtual reality drama
Speed of Joy	Award for the web series Her Story

== 2017 ==
Recipient	Area of excellence
Career achievement honors
Carol Burnett	Awarded to "one of the all-time greats of television comedy" (The first Peabody awarded in a career achievement-specific category)
Institutional honors
The Fred Rogers Company	Awarded for "carrying on the legacy of its eponymous founder"
60 Minutes	Awarded to "one of the most enduring media institutions celebrating 50 years on the air"
Documentary honorees
Intrepid Cinema, Radiator Film, and American Documentary Inc. (Airing on PBS' POV)	The Islands and the Whales
Larm Film, Aleppo Media Center, AMC, and American Documentary Inc. (Airing on PBS' POV)	Last Men in Aleppo
American Documentary Inc, World, Rooy Media LLC, and ITVS	America ReFramed, for Deej
The People's Poet Media Group LLC, WNET/New York NY, and ITVS in association with Artemis Rising; Airing on PBS' American Masters)	Maya Angelou: And Still I Rise, about Maya Angelou
Mile 22 LLC, ITVS, KA Snyder Productions, Cuomo Cole Productions, Artemis Rising, and Transform Films (Airing on PBS' Independent Lens)	Newtown, on the Sandy Hook Elementary School shooting
American Experience (PBS and WGBH-TV/Boston, MA)	Oklahoma City, on the Oklahoma City bombing
Exposure Labs (in partnership with The Ocean Agency), View Into the Blue (in association with Argent Pictures), and The Kendeda Fund (Distributed through Netflix)	Chasing Coral
Fuse Media	Indivisible, a documentary on three Deferred Action for Childhood Arrivals recipients
Spike TV, Cinemart, and Roc Nation	Time: The Kalief Browder Story
Entertainment, children's and youth honorees
Netflix	A Series of Unfortunate Events
Netflix and Art & Industry	Hasan Minhaj: Homecoming King
CBS Television Studios, Funny or Die, and 3 Arts Entertainment for Netflix	American Vandal
HBO Entertainment in association with Issa Rae Productions, Penny for Your Thoughts Entertainment and 3 Arts Entertainment	Insecure
HBO Entertainment in association with Sixteen String Jack Productions and Avalon Television	Last Week Tonight with John Oliver
Sony Pictures Television and Gran Via Productions	Better Call Saul
SNL Studios in association with Universal Television and Broadway Video	Saturday Night Live, for its political satire sketches
Hulu, MGM Television, White Oak Pictures, The Littlefield Company, and Daniel Wilson Productions	The Handmaid's Tale
Amazon Studios	The Marvelous Mrs. Maisel
News, radio, podcast, and public service programming honorees
KXAS/Dallas, TX	Big Buses, Bigger Problems: Taxpayers Taken for a Ride, an investigation into real estate deals made by the Dallas County Schools after a failed investment in school bus camera systems
Vice News Tonight (HBO)	Award for coverage of the Unite the Right rally and its aftermath in Charlottesville, VA
CNN	Award for its coverage of the fall of ISIS in Iraq and Syria
PBS NewsHour (PBS and WETA-TV/Washington, DC)	"Inside Putin's Russia", a series of reports on the impact of Russia under the rule of Vladimir Putin
BBC News	Award for its coverage on Rohingya refugees fleeing to Bangladesh to avoid persecution in the Myanma state of Rakhine
60 Minutes (CBS News) and The Washington Post	Award for "The Whistleblower", in which ex-DEA agent Joe Rannazzisi uncovered his own organization's failure (due to Congressional interference) to hold Big Pharma accountable in the opioid epidemic
NPR and ProPublica	Award for their reports on how and why the U.S. has the highest rate in the developed world of women dying as a consequence of pregnancy and childbirth
Minnesota Public Radio and American Public Media	74 Seconds, a podcast that details the shooting of Philando Castile and its legal and political ramifications
Serial and This American Life	S-Town
Kentucky Center for Investigative Reporting and Louisville Public Media	The Pope's Long Con , a podcast series exploring the background of Kentucky legislator Dan Johnson
Gimlet Media	Uncivil, for the episode "The Raid"
Al Jazeera Correspondent	Public service award for "The Cut," which explored the legal use of female genital mutilation in Africa
Peabody-Facebook Futures of Media honorees
The Pudding and Polygraph	Awarded to The Pudding for Digital Journalism
Cult Leader and The National Film Board of Canada	Awarded to The Space We Hold for Interactive Documentary
Visual Editions and Google's Creative Lab	Awarded to Editions at Play for Mobile
Buried Signal and Annapurna Interactive	Awarded to Gorogoa for Video Games
Oculus Story Studio	Awarded to Dear Angelica for Virtual Reality/360
Felix and Paul Studios, Oculus in collaboration with Funny or Die	Awarded to Miyubi for Virtual Reality/360

== 2018 ==
Recipient	Area of excellence
Career achievement honors
Rita Moreno	Awarded to "a unique talent" whose barrier-breaking career "continues to thrive six-plus decades after her acting debut"
Institutional honors
Kartemquin Films	Awarded for the production company's "commitment to unflinching documentary filmmaking and telling an American history rooted in social justice and the stories of the marginalized"
Sesame Street	Awarded for the program's "50 years of educating and entertaining children in the U.S. and around the world"
Peabody Catalyst Award honor
ProPublica	Award for releasing audio of immigrant children separated from their parents by U.S. Border Patrol agents (the first "Peabody Catalyst Award")
Documentary honorees
National Film Board of Canada and American Documentary | POV (Airing on PBS' POV)	The Apology
HBO Documentary Films and Moxie Firecracker Films	A Dangerous Son
Carlos Santana in association with 5 Stick Films and The Dolores Huerta Film Project, LLC (Airing on PBS' Independent Lens)	Dolores
Frontline	The Facebook Dilemma, which examined the social media platform's growth and its negative impact on privacy and democracy
Thirteen Productions LLC, Antelope South Ltd., Normal Life Pictures, in association with the BBC and ZDF in collaboration with Arte (Airing on PBS)	The Jazz Ambassadors
Three Judges LLC, Idle Wild Films Inc., and Independent Television Service (ITVS), with funding provided by the Corporation for Public Broadcasting (CPB) (Airing on PBS' Independent Lens)	The Judge
Lorraine Hansberry Documentary Project, LLC in co-production with Independent Television Service and Black Public Media in association with The Film Posse, Chiz Schultz Inc. and American Masters Pictures (Airing on PBS' American Masters)	Lorraine Hansberry: Sighted Eyes/Feeling Heart
Hulu in association with Kartemquin and American Documentary | POV and ITVS	Minding the Gap
Entertainment, children's and youth honorees
Fox 21 Television Studios and FX Productions	The Americans (the show's second win, a rare feat for a Peabody winner)
Fox 21 Television Studios and FX Productions	Pose
Netflix	Hannah Gadsby: Nanette
Netflix	Patriot Act with Hasan Minhaj
HBO Entertainment in association with Alec Berg and Hanarply	Barry
HBO Entertainment in association with A24 and MVMT	Random Acts of Flyness
Clerkenwell Films/Dominic Buchanan Productions for Channel 4 Television and Netflix	The End of the F***ing World
Universal Television, Fremulon and 3 Arts Entertainment	The Good Place
Sid Gentle Films for BBC America	Killing Eve
Cartoon Network Studios	Steven Universe
News and radio/podcast honorees
E:60, Outside the Lines, ESPNW, and SportsCenter (ESPN)	"Spartan Silence: Crisis at Michigan State", a series that examined MSU's knowledge of Larry Nassar's role in the USA Gymnastics sex abuse scandal
Michigan Radio (NPR)	Award for the Believed podcast, which explored the Larry Nassar scandal from the survivors' point of view
PBS NewsHour	Award for "The Plastic Problem", a report about plastic pollution and its effects on Earth's ecosystem
Reveal from the Center for Investigative Reporting, PRX, PBS NewsHour and the Associated Press	Award for "Kept Out", a report that goes into disparities between people of color and white people in terms of lending
Type Investigations and Reveal (Center for Investigative Reporting and PRX)	"Monumental Lies", a report exploring how "disturbing – and distorted – view[s] of history" led to the erection of monuments memorializing the Confederacy and its leaders
BBC Africa Eye (BBC News)	"Anatomy of a Killing", an investigation confirming the veracity of a graphic viral video, in which two Cameroon Armed Forces soldiers killed two women and their two children
Frontline	Separated: Children at the Border, which examined the roots of the policy that segregates immigrant children from their families at the Mexico–United States border
KING-TV/Seattle, WA	"Back of the Class", a report detailing a lack of support and services for students with disabilities at Washington public schools
ITN for Channel 4 News	Award for an exposé on Cambridge Analytica and their role in a data scandal with Facebook
The New York Times	Caliphate, a 12-part podcast in which reporter Rukmini Callimachi explores the allure of ISIS and motivations of those who join the terrorist group (Returned by The New York Times in December 2020)
WABE/Atlanta, GA	Buried Truths, for Hank Klibanoff's exploration of voter suppression in Georgia in 1948, when Isaiah Nixon was murdered "for exercising his right to vote"
WAGA-TV/Atlanta, GA	"$2 Tests: Bad Arrests", a report that details how police use "a quick, cheap way to analyze suspicious substances in the field," and how its use led to many false arrests
Peabody-Facebook Futures of Media Award honorees
The Marshall Project in partnership with Longreads	Awarded to Banished for Digital Journalism
The Submarine Channel and VPRO	Awarded to The Industry: Mapping the Dutch Drug Economy for Interactive Documentary
BBC	Awarded to Civilisations Augmented Reality App for Mobile
Illya Szilak and Cyril Tsiboulski	Awarded to Queerskins for Transmedia
3909 LLC	Awarded to Return of the Obra Dinn for Video Game
Aaron Bradbury	Awarded to Vestige for Virtual Reality
Twitch	Awarded to Artificial for Webisode

== 2019 ==
Recipient	Area of excellence
Career achievement honors
Cicely Tyson	Honored for being "a foundational figure in the advancement of meaningful programming and social change"
Institutional honors
Frontline	Honored for being "an unwavering source for truth through quality journalism when both are under attack"
The Simpsons	Honored for being "one of the most consistently funny and culturally important satirical sitcoms over the last three decades"
Entertainment honorees
HBO Miniseries and SKY in association with Sister, The Mighty Mint and Word Games	Chernobyl
HBO Entertainment in association with Project Zeus, Hyperobject Industries and Gary Sanchez Productions	Succession
HBO Entertainment in association with White Rabbit, Paramount, Warner Bros. Television and DC	Watchmen
Page Fright and Outlier Productions in association with Warner Horizon Scripted Television	David Makes Man
Apple/wiip/Anonymous Content/Tuning Fork Productions/Sugar 23 Productions	Dickinson
All3Media International Limited and Amazon Studios	Fleabag
A24 Television	Ramy
Monkey Massacre Productions and 21 Laps Entertainment	Stranger Things
Timberman-Beverly Productions, Sage Lane Productions, Escapist Fare, Katie Couric Media and CBS Television Studios for Netflix	Unbelievable
Participant Media, Tribeca Productions, Harpo Films and Array Filmworks for Netflix	When They See Us
Documentary honorees
CNN Films	Apollo 11
Frontline, Channel 4 News and ITN Productions	For Sama
A production of Idiom Film, LLC and Louverture Films, in association with Field of Vision (Airing on PBS' Independent Lens)	Hale County This Morning, This Evening
Fishbowl Films, Motto Pictures, 19340 Productions, Shark Island Institute, HHMI Tangled Bank Studios and IQ190 Productions (Airing on PBS' POV)	Inventing Tomorrow
Old Chilly Pictures LLC, American Documentary and Independent Television Service (Airing on PBS' POV)	Midnight Traveler
Final Cut for Real, Mouka Filmi, STORY, Bayerischer Rundfunk, Arte and American Documentary (Airing on PBS' POV)	The Distant Barking of Dogs
Semilla Verde Productions, Lucernam Films, American Documentary, ITVS, Latino Public Broadcasting and El Deseo (Airing on PBS' POV)	The Silence of Others
Bunim/Murray Productions and Kreativ Inc. for Lifetime	Surviving R. Kelly
A Busca Vida Filmes Production in association with Violet Films for Netflix	The Edge of Democracy
HBO Documentary Films and Kunhardt Films	True Justice: Bryan Stevenson's Fight for Equality
Podcast/radio honorees
OSM Audio and WNYC Studios	Dolly Parton's America
BBC Sounds/George the Poet Ltd.	Have You Heard George's Podcast?
American Public Media	In the Dark: The Path Home, for its examination of Curtis Flowers' quadruple homicide case trials
Auricle Productions	Threshold's third season The Refuge , which covers the controversy over drilling for oil in the Arctic National Wildlife Refuge and what's at stake if drilling does, or doesn't, happen.
News honorees
NBC News	Award for A Different Kind of Force: Policing Mental Illness, which covers how local police in San Antonio and Houston handle people with mental illness using empathy instead of violence
NBC News, Engel Unit	Award for Richard Engel's reports on the cost of the United States's decision to abandon the Kurds
Newsday	Long Island Divided, an investigation into housing discrimination in the area and the impact it had on its towns and communities
CNN	Award for a look at undocumented workers in the American Midwest and their positive impact on businesses and communities
WBBM-TV/Chicago, IL	"Unwarranted", an investigation into botched police raids in Chicago and the impact they left on families and their homes
Children's and youth honorees
WGBH Educational Foundation and Atomic Cartoons	Molly of Denali

== Notes ==
1.In December 2020, The New York Times would return its Peabody for Caliphate after an internal investigation revealed that reportage included on the podcast, specifically one witness' unverifiable accounts of ISIS atrocities, did not adhere to the Times' standards for accuracy.
