= Golden Reel Award for Outstanding Achievement in Sound Editing – Feature Underscore =

- Country: United States
- Presented by: Motion Picture Sound Editors
- Currently held by: Ramiro Belgardt, Joe E. Rand, David Channing – West Side Story (2021)

The Golden Reel Award for Outstanding Achievement in Sound Editing – Feature Underscore is an annual award given by the Motion Picture Sound Editors. It honors sound editors whose work has warranted merit in the field of film; in this case, their work in the field of music editing in theatrically released motion pictures. The awards title has gone through many incarnations since its inception, but its focus has been on honoring exemplary work of music editors. Until 2005, animated films had their own category; since then, they have been eligible for this award. In 2022, a category was presented exclusively for documentary features.

== Winners and nominees ==
=== 1990s ===
| Year | Film | Winners/Nominees |
|---|---|---|
| 1994 | The Lion King | Dominick Certo, Adam Milo Smalley (supervising music editors) |
| 1994 | Mary Shelley's Frankenstein | Gerard McCann (music editor) |
| 1995 | Best Sound Editing - Music (Foreign & Domestic) | |
| 1995 | Seven | Robert Randles (music consultant) |
| 1995 | Jefferson in Paris | Gerard McCann (music editor) |
| 1995 | Mortal Kombat | Joanie Diener (music editor) |
| 1995 | Best Sound Editing - Music (Animated) | |
| 1995 | Pocahontas | Kathleen Fogarty-Bennett (supervising music editor) |
| 1996 | Motion Picture Feature Films: Music Editing | |
| 1996 | The English Patient | Robert Randles (music editor) |
| 1996 | Hamlet | Gerard McCann (music editor) |
| 1996 | The Quest | David Bondelevitch (music editor) |
| 1996 | The Rock | Bob Badami, John Finklea (music editors) |
| 1996 | William Shakespeare's Romeo & Juliet | Mark Jan Wlodarkiewicz (music editor) |
| 1996 | Animated Motion Picture Feature Films: Music Editing | |
| 1996 | The Hunchback of Notre Dame | Kathleen Fogarty-Bennett (supervising music editor); Mark Green, Charles Paley (music editors) |
| 1997 | Best Sound Editing - Music (Foreign & Domestic) | |
| 1997 | James Cameron's Titanic | Jim Henrikson (supervising music editor); Joe E. Rand (music editor) |
| 1997 | As Good as It Gets | Zigmund Gron (music editor) |
| 1997 | The Full Monty | Graham Lawrence (music editor) |
| 1997 | Good Will Hunting | Kenneth Karman (music editor) |
| 1997 | L.A. Confidential | Kenneth Hall (music editor) |
| 1997 | Men in Black | Ellen Segal (music editor) |
| 1997 | The Postman | Jim Weidman (supervising music editor); David Olson (music editor) |
| 1997 | Scream 2 | Bill Abbott (music editor) |
| 1997 | Best Sound Editing - Music Animation | |
| 1997 | Anastasia | Brent Brooks (music editor); Tom Villano (scoring editor) |
| 1997 | Cats Don't Dance | Craig Pettigrew (music editor) |
| 1997 | Hercules | Kathleen Fogarty-Bennett, Earl Ghaffari (music editors) |
| 1998 | Best Sound Editing - Music (Foreign & Domestic) | |
| 1998 | The Butcher Boy | Michael Connell (music/scoring editor) |
| 1998 | American History X | Richard Ford (music editor) |
| 1998 | Armageddon | Bob Badami (music supervisor); Will Kaplan (music editor); Shannon Erbe, Mark Jan Wlodarkiewicz (additional music editors) |
| 1998 | Bulworth | Bob Badami (music designer/editor); Shannon Erbe, Lisa Jaime, Jennifer Nash (assistant music editors) |
| 1998 | The Horse Whisperer | Bill Bernstein (music editor); Jordan Corngold, Kenneth Hall, Tod Holcomb (additional music editors) |
| 1998 | Saving Private Ryan | Kenneth Wannberg (music editor); Kelly Mahan-Jaramillo (assistant music editor) |
| 1998 | The Thin Red Line | Lee Scott, Adam Milo Smalley (music editors); Scott Rouse (assistant music editor) |
| 1998 | Waking Ned Devine | Robert Hathaway (music editor) |
| 1998 | Best Sound Editing - Music - Animated Feature | |
| 1998 | Antz | Adam Milo Smalley (supervising music editor); Brian Richards (music/scoring editor) |
| 1998 | A Bug's Life | Lori L. Eschler (supervising music editor); Bruno Coon (assistant music editor) |
| 1998 | Mulan | Kenneth Hall (supervising music editor); Kathleen Fogarty-Bennett, Tom Kramer (song music editors); Robert Bayless (assistant music scoring editor) |
| 1998 | The Prince of Egypt | Adam Milo Smalley (supervising music editor); Brian Richards (assistant music editor) |
| 1999 | Best Sound Editing - Music (Foreign & Domestic) | |
| 1999 | American Beauty | Bill Bernstein (music/scoring editor); Joanie Diener (music editor); Jordan Corngold (assistant music editor); Dennis S. Sands (scoring mixer); Scott Millan (re-recording music mixer) |
| 1999 | Anna and the King | Michael T. Ryan, Graham Sutton (music editors) |
| 1999 | Any Given Sunday | Bill Abbott, Johnny Caruso (music/scoring editors); Denise Okimoto (music editor) |
| 1999 | The Hurricane | Thomas Milano (supervising music editor/scoring editor); Tanya Noel Hill (music/scoring editor) |
| 1999 | The Insider | Curt Sobel (supervising music/scoring editor); Thomas Milano (music/scoring editor); Bob Badami (music editor) |
| 1999 | The Matrix | Lori L. Eschler (music/scoring editor); Jordan Corngold, Zigmund Gron (music editors) |
| 1999 | Stigmata | Mike Flicker (supervising music editor/scoring editor); Kenneth Karman, Stephen Lotwis (supervising music editors); Billy Corgan (scoring editor) |
| 1999 | The Talented Mr. Ripley | Robert Randles (music/scoring editor) |
| 1999 | Best Sound Editing - Music - Animated Feature | |
| 1999 | South Park: Bigger, Longer & Uncut | Daniel DiPrima (music/scoring editor); Brian Bulman (assistant music editor); Tim Boyle, Dennis S. Sands (scoring mixers) |
| 1999 | The Iron Giant | Christopher Brooks (music editor) |
| 1999 | The King and I | Douglas M. Lackey (music/scoring editor) |
| 1999 | Tarzan | Earl Ghaffari (music editor) |
| 1999 | Toy Story 2 | Bruno Coon (supervising music editor); Lisa Jaime (music editor) |

=== 2000s ===
| Year | Film | Winners/Nominees |
|---|---|---|
| 2000 | Best Sound Editing - Music (Foreign & Domestic) | |
| 2000 | High Fidelity | Michael Higham (supervising music editor); Shari Johanson, Joe Lisanti (music editors); Adrian Rhodes (re-recording mixer) |
| 2000 | Committed | Mark Jan Wlodarkiewicz (music/scoring editor) |
| 2000 | Crouching Tiger, Hidden Dragon | Steven Epstein, Wen-Zhao Pei, Emmy Tu (music producers), Richard King (music mixer) |
| 2000 | Gladiator | Dashiell Rae, Marc Streitenfeld (music editors) |
| 2000 | Remember the Titans | Will Kaplan (music/scoring editor) |
| 2000 | Turn It Up | Richard A. Harrison (music/scoring editor) |
| 2000 | Best Sound Editing - Music - Animated Feature | |
| 2000 | Chicken Run | Richard Whitfield (supervising music editor) |
| 2000 | Dinosaur | David Olson, Jim Weidman (music editors) |
| 2000 | The Emperor's New Groove | Paul Silver (music editor) |
| 2000 | The Road to El Dorado | Adam Milo Smalley (supervising music editor); Vicki Hiatt (music editor) |
| 2000 | Titan A.E. | Joshua Winget (scoring/music editor) |
| 2001 | Best Sound Editing - Music (Foreign & Domestic) | |
| 2001 | The Lord of the Rings: The Fellowship of the Ring | Nancy Allen, Suzana Peric (music editors); Andrew Dudman, Michael Price (scoring editors) |
| 2001 | Ali | Lisa Jaime, Kenneth Karman (music/scoring editors); Vicki Hiatt, Stephanie Lowry, Christine H. Luethje (music editor) |
| 2001 | A Beautiful Mind | Jim Henrikson (music editor) |
| 2001 | Black Knight | David Bondelevitch, Terry Wilson (music editors) |
| 2001 | Focus | Joanie Diener (music editor) |
| 2001 | Vanilla Sky | Carlton Kaller (music/scoring editor) |
| 2001 | Best Sound Editing - Music - Animated Feature | |
| 2001 | Shrek | Brian Richards (music editor) |
| 2001 | Jimmy Neutron: Boy Genius | Jim Harrison (supervising music editor) |
| 2001 | Monsters, Inc. | Bruno Coon (music editor) |
| 2002 | Best Sound Editing in a Feature - Music - Feature Film | |
| 2002 | The Mothman Prophecies | Mark Jan Wlodarkiewicz (music editor) |
| 2002 | Adaptation | Adam Milo Smalley (music/scoring editor) |
| 2002 | Catch Me If You Can | Kenneth Wannberg (music editor) |
| 2002 | Confessions of a Dangerous Mind | Stephen Lotwis, Andrew Silver (music editors) |
| 2002 | Gangs of New York | Patricia Carlin, Jennifer L. Dunnington, Kathy Durning, Tass Filipos (music editors) |
| 2002 | The Lord of the Rings: The Two Towers | Andrew Dudman, Michael Fife, Becca Gatrell, Raphaël Mouterde, Michael Price, Steve Price, Jonathan Schultz, Nigel Scott, Mark Willsher (music editors) |
| 2002 | Road to Perdition | Bill Bernstein (music editor) |
| 2002 | Unfaithful | Christopher Kennedy (supervising music/scoring editor); Johnny Caruso, Joe Lisanti (music editor) |
| 2002 | Best Sound Editing in Animated Features - Music | |
| 2002 | Lilo & Stitch | Kenneth Karman (music editor) |
| 2002 | Ice Age | Richard A. Harrison (music editor) |
| 2002 | The Princess and the Pea | David Bondelevitch (music editor) |
| 2002 | Spirit: Stallion of the Cimarron | Slamm Andrews (music/scoring editor), Robb Boyd (music editor) |
| 2002 | The Wild Thornberrys Movie | Michael Baber (music editor) |
| 2003 | Best Sound Editing in a Feature - Music - Feature Film | |
| 2003 | Cold Mountain | Fernand Bos, Allan Jenkins, Kirsty Whalley (music editors) |
| 2003 | Gods and Generals | Lisa Jaime (music editor) |
| 2003 | Jeepers Creepers 2 | David Bondelevitch, Victor Salva (music editors) |
| 2003 | Kill Bill: Volume 1 | Jay B. Richardson (music editor) |
| 2003 | The Lord of the Rings: The Return of the King | Andrew Dudman, Michael Fife, Becca Gatrell, Michael Price, Steve Price, Jonathan Schultz, Nigel Scott (music editors) |
| 2003 | Pirates of the Caribbean: The Curse of the Black Pearl | Christopher Brooks (music/scoring editor); Kenneth Karman, Jeanette Surga (music editors) |
| 2003 | Something's Gotta Give | Andrew Silver (music/scoring editor); Kenneth Karman, Lee Scott (music editors) |
| 2003 | Underworld | Joanie Diener (music/scoring editor) |
| 2003 | Best Sound Editing in Animated Features - Music | |
| 2003 | Finding Nemo | Bill Bernstein (music editor) |
| 2003 | Brother Bear | Earl Ghaffari (music editor) |
| 2003 | The Jungle Book 2 | Craig Pettigrew (music editor) |
| 2004 | Best Sound Editing in a Feature - Music - Feature Film | |
| 2004 | The Passion of the Christ | Michael T. Ryan (music editor) |
| 2004 | The Aviator | Jennifer L. Dunnington (music editor) |
| 2004 | 50 First Dates | J.J. George, Stuart Grusin (music editors) |
| 2004 | Hidalgo | Jim Weidman (supervising music editor); David Olson (music editor) |
| 2004 | Kill Bill: Volume 2 | Jay B. Richardson (music editor) |
| 2004 | The Life Aquatic with Steve Zissou | Richard Henderson (music editor) |
| 2004 | Ned Kelly | Gerard McCann (music editor) |
| 2004 | The Village | Thomas S. Drescher (music editor) |
| 2005 | Best Sound Editing in Feature Film - Music | |
| 2005 | Casanova | Jamie Lowry, Roy Prendergast (music editors) |
| 2005 | Batman Begins | Steven Price (supervising music editor); Simon Changer, Gareth Cousins, Richard Robson (music editors) |
| 2005 | Charlie and the Chocolate Factory | Bill Abbott, Michael Higham, Shie Rozow (music editors) |
| 2005 | The Constant Gardener | Tony Lewis (music editor) |
| 2005 | The Great Raid | Johnny Caruso (music editor) |
| 2005 | Kingdom of Heaven | Marc Streitenfeld (music editor) |
| 2005 | Peter Jackson's King Kong | Jim Weidman (supervising music editor); Peter Myles (music editor) |
| 2005 | Memoirs of a Geisha | Ramiro Belgardt, Kenneth Karman, Kenneth Wannberg (music editors) |
| 2006 | Best Sound Editing for Music in a Feature Film | |
| 2006 | Apocalypto | Dick Bernstein, Jim Henrikson (music editors) |
| 2006 | Babel | Anibal Kerpel (music editor) |
| 2006 | Bobby | Sally Boldt, Lisa Jaime, Stephen Lotwis, Lee Scott (music editors) |
| 2006 | Children of Men | Michael Price (music editor) |
| 2006 | Click | J.J. George, Stuart Grusin (music editors) |
| 2006 | Lucky Number Slevin | Kevin Banks, Arthur Pingrey (music editors) |
| 2006 | Pirates of the Caribbean: Dead Man's Chest | Melissa Muik (supervising music editor); Julie Pearce (music editor) |
| 2006 | The Proposition | Gerard McCann (music editor) |
| 2007 | Best Sound Editing - Music in a Feature Film | |
| 2007 | Into the Wild | Richard Henderson (music editor) |
| 2007 | American Gangster | Del Spiva (music editor) |
| 2007 | The Assassination of Jesse James by the Coward Robert Ford | William B. Kaplan, Gerard McCann (music editors); Jonathan Karp (additional music editor) |
| 2007 | The Golden Compass | Gerard McCann (supervising music editor); Peter Clarke (music editor); Andrew Dudman, Robert Houston, Stuart Morton, Sam Okell (additional music editors) |
| 2007 | The Great Debaters | Todd Kasow (music editor) |
| 2007 | Pirates of the Caribbean: At World's End | Melissa Muik (supervising music editor); Katie Greathouse, Barbara McDermott (music editors) |
| 2007 | Spider-Man 3 | Thomas Milano (supervising music editor); Cory Milano, Shie Rozow, Michael T. Ryan (music editors) |
2008
| 2008 | The Dark Knight | Alex Gibson (supervising music editor); Daniel Pinder (music editor) |
| 2008 | Bedtime Stories | J.J. George (supervising music editor); Kevin Crehan, Tom Kramer (music editors) |
| 2008 | The Curious Case of Benjamin Button | Joe E. Rand (supervising music editor); Marie Ebbing, Ren Klyce, Erik Swanson, Robert Wolff (music editors) |
| 2008 | Hellboy II: The Golden Army | Shie Rozow (supervising music editor) |
| 2008 | Iron Man | Shannon Erbe, Tanya Noel Hill, David Klotz (music editors) |
| 2008 | Nick & Norah's Infinite Playlist | Andrew Dorfman (supervising music editor) |
| 2008 | Slumdog Millionaire | Niv Adiri (supervising music editor) |
2009
| 2009 | James Cameron's Avatar | Jim Henrikson (supervising music editor); Michael K. Bauer, Dick Bernstein (music editor) |
| 2009 | An Education | Ben Barker (supervising music editor); Christopher Benstead (music editor) |
| 2009 | (500) Days of Summer | Jen Monnar (supervising music editor) |
| 2009 | The Informant! | Missy Cohen (supervising music editor) |
| 2009 | It's Complicated | Andrew Silver (supervising music editor); Stephanie Lowry, Ryan Rubin (music editors) |
| 2009 | Sherlock Holmes | Bob Badami (supervising music editor); Peter Oso Snell (music editor) |
| 2009 | Star Trek | Stephen M. Davis (supervising music editor); Ramiro Belgardt, Alex Levy (music editors) |
| 2009 | 2012 | Fernand Bos (supervising music editor); Ronald J. Webb, Adrian Van Velsen (music editors) |

=== 2010s ===
| Year | Film | Winners/Nominees |
|---|---|---|
2010
| 2010 | Inception | Alex Gibson (supervising music editor); Ryan Rubin (music editor) |
| 2010 | Alice in Wonderland | Bill Abbott, Michael Higham (supervising music editors); Denise Okimoto, Curtis Roush, Ryan Rubin (music editors) |
| 2010 | Black Swan | Nancy Allen (music editor) |
| 2010 | Get Low | Christopher Kennedy (music editor) |
| 2010 | Harry Potter and the Deathly Hallows – Part 1 | Gerard McCann (supervising music editor); Peter Clarke, Robert Houston, Allan Jenkins, Stuart Morton, Kirsty Whalley (music editors) |
| 2010 | Let Me In | Paul Apelgren (music editor) |
| 2010 | The Losers | Shie Rozow (music editor) |
| 2010 | The Social Network | Jonathon Stevens (supervising music editor); Marie Ebbing, Ren Klyce (music editors) |
2011
| 2011 | Hugo | Jennifer L. Dunnington (supervising music editor); Jonathan Schultz (supervising scoring editor); Robert Houston (music editor); Yann McCullough, Kirsty Whalley (scoring editors) |
| 2011 | Drive | Annette Kudrak (supervising music editor) |
| 2011 | The Girl with the Dragon Tattoo | Jonathon Stevens (supervising music editor); Marie Ebbing, Ren Klyce (music editors) |
| 2011 | Hop | J.J. George (supervising music editor); Bryon Rickerson (music editor) |
| 2011 | Priest | Thomas Milano (supervising music editor); Jaclyn Newman Dorn, Cory Milano, Steven A. Saltzman (music editors); Daniel Pinder (temp music editor) |
| 2011 | Super 8 | Alex Levy (supervising music editor); Paul Apelgren, Ramiro Belgardt, Will Kaplan (music editors) |
| 2011 | Transformers: Dark of the Moon | Alex Gibson (supervising music editor); Ryan Rubin (music editor) |
| 2011 | The Tree of Life | Dick Bernstein (supervising music editor); Peter Clarke (music editors) |
2012
| 2012 | Life of Pi | Erich Stratmann (music editor); Mitch Bederman (additional music editor) |
| 2012 | Argo | Richard Ford (supervising music editor); David Metzner (additional music editor) |
| 2012 | The Cabin in the Woods | Clint Bennett (supervising music editor); Tony Lewis, Julie Pearce (music editors) |
| 2012 | The Dark Knight Rises | Alex Gibson (supervising music editor); Ryan Rubin (music editor) |
| 2012 | Django Unchained | Robb Boyd (music editor) |
| 2012 | The Hobbit: An Unexpected Journey | Jennifer L. Dunnington (supervising music editor); Stephen Gallagher (music/temp music editor); Michael Pärt, Nigel Scott, Mark Willsher (music editors); Robert Houston, Yann McCullough, Jonathan Schultz, Kirsty Whalley (scoring editors); James Sizemore (additional music editor) |
| 2012 | Lincoln | Alex Gibson (supervising music editor); Ryan Rubin (music editor) |
| 2012 | Skyfall | Dick Bernstein, Tony Lewis (supervising music editors) |
2013
| 2013 | The Great Gatsby | Jason Ruder, Tim Ryan (supervising music editors); Craig Beckett (music editor) |
| 2013 | American Hustle | Sally Boldt, Philip Tallman (music editors) |
| 2013 | 47 Ronin | Andrew Silver (supervising music editor); Kenneth Karman, Julie Pearce, Peter Oso Snell (music editors) |
| 2013 | Gravity | Christopher Benstead (supervising music editor) |
| 2013 | The Hobbit: The Desolation of Smaug | Mark Willsher (supervising music editor); Stephen Gallagher, Jonathan Schultz, Nigel Scott, Kirsty Whalley (music editors) |
| 2013 | Mandela: Long Walk to Freedom | Lewis Morison (supervising music editor); Michael Connell, Robert Houston, Tony Lewis, Neil Stemp (music editors) |
| 2013 | 12 Years a Slave | Bob Badami, Katrina Schiller, Catherine Wilson (music editors) |
| 2013 | World War Z | John Finklea (supervising music editor); Kevin McKeever (music editor) |
2014
| 2014 | Birdman or (The Unexpected Virtue of Ignorance) | Martin Hernández, Will Kaplan, Terry Wilson (music editors) |
| 2014 | Dawn of the Planet of the Apes | Paul Apelgren (music editor) |
| 2014 | The Fault in Our Stars | Katrina Schiller (music editor) |
| 2014 | Gone Girl | Jonathon Stevens (supervising music editor); Ren Klyce (music editor) |
| 2014 | Guardians of the Galaxy | Steve Durkee (supervising music editor); Darrell Hall, Will Kaplan (music editors) |
| 2014 | Interstellar | Alex Gibson (supervising music editor); Ryan Rubin (music editor) |
| 2014 | Selma | Clint Bennett, Julie Pearce (music editors) |
2015
| 2015 | Star Wars: The Force Awakens | Ramiro Belgardt (supervising music editor); Paul Apelgren (music editor) |
| 2015 | Creed | Ronald J. Webb (music editor) |
| 2015 | Jupiter Ascending | Paul Apelgren (supervising music editor); Alex Levy, Daniel Pinder (music editors) |
| 2015 | Jurassic World | Paul Apelgren, Alex Levy (music editors) |
| 2015 | Mad Max: Fury Road | Bob Badami (supervising music editor); Alex Gibson, Ryan Rubin, Katrina Schiller (music editors) |
| 2015 | The Martian | Tony Lewis, Richard Whitfield (music editors) |
| 2015 | Mission: Impossible – Rogue Nation | John Finklea (supervising music editor); Simon Changer, Michael Higham (music editors) |
| 2015 | The Revenant | Joseph S. DeBeasi, Martin Hernández, Richard Henderson, Steven A. Saltzman, Curt Sobel, Terry Wilson (music editors) |
2016
| 2016 | Warcraft | Michael K. Bauer, Peter Myles (music editors) |
| 2016 | Arrival | Clint Bennett (music editor) |
| 2016 | Doctor Strange | Steve Durkee (supervising music editor); Warren Brown, Stephen M. Davis, Anele Onyekwere, Nashia Wachsman (music editors) |
| 2016 | Don't Breathe | Maarten Hofmeijer (music editor) |
| 2016 | Hacksaw Ridge | Matt Friedman, Andy Patterson (music editors) |
| 2016 | Rogue One: A Star Wars Story | John Finklea (supervising music editor); Warren Brown, Stephen M. Davis (music editors) |
| 2016 | Star Trek Beyond | Warren Brown, Stephen M. Davis, Paul Rabjohns (music editors) |
| 2016 | 13 Hours: The Secret Soldiers of Benghazi | Alex Gibson (supervising music editor); Lee Scott, Nate Underkuffler (music editors) |
| 2017 | Outstanding Achievement in Sound Editing - Music Score for Feature Film | |
| 2017 | Dunkirk | Alex Gibson (supervising music editor); Ryan Rubin (music editor) |
| 2017 | Baby Driver | Julian Slater (supervising music editor), Bradley Farmer (music editor) |
| 2017 | Blade Runner 2049 | Clint Bennett (supervising music editor); Ryan Rubin, Del Spiva (music editors) |
| 2017 | King Arthur: Legend of the Sword | Simon Changer (supervising music editor); Ben Smithers (music editor) |
| 2017 | The Lost City of Z | Katherine Gordon Miller (music editor) |
| 2017 | The Shape of Water | Dustin Harris, Rob Hegedus, Cam McLauchlin (music editors) |
| 2017 | Transformers: The Last Knight | Alex Gibson (supervising music editor); Daniel DiPrima, Darrell Hall, Bryan Lawson, Dane Leon, Jason Ruder, Jeanette Surga, Philip Tallman (music editors) |
| 2017 | Wonder Woman | Christopher Benstead, Simon Changer, J.J. George, Gerard McCann (music editors) |
2018
| 2018 | Spider-Man: Into the Spider-Verse | Katie Greathouse, Catherine Wilson (music editors) |
| 2018 | Aquaman | J.J. George, Paul Rabjohns (music editors) |
| 2018 | The Ballad of Buster Scruggs | Todd Kasow (music editor) |
| 2018 | Black Panther | Steve Durkee (supervising music editor); Anele Onyekwere, Nashia Wachsman, Ronald J. Webb (music editors) |
| 2018 | First Man | Jason Ruder (supervising music editor); Lena Glikson (music editor) |
| 2018 | Isle of Dogs | Yann McCullough (supervising music editor) |
| 2018 | Mission: Impossible – Fallout | Cecile Tournesac (music editor) |
| 2018 | A Quiet Place | Jim Schultz (supervising music editor); Del Spiva (music editor) |
| 2018 | Roma | Alitzel Díaz Rueda Flores, Caleb Townsend (music editors) |
2019
| 2019 | Jojo Rabbit | Paul Apelgren (music editor) |
| 2019 | Ad Astra | Jason Ruder, Katrina Schiller (supervising music editors); Lena Glikson, Darrell Hall, Will Kaplan, Philip Tallman (music editors); Sam Zeines, Richard Ziegler (scoring editors) |
| 2019 | Dolemite Is My Name | Philip Tallman (music editor) |
| 2019 | Joker | Jason Ruder (supervising music editor); Lena Glikson, Daniel Waldman (music editors) |
| 2019 | Little Women | Suzana Peric (music editor); Xavier Forcioli (scoring editor) |
| 2019 | Once Upon a Time in Hollywood | Jim Schultz (music editor) |
| 2019 | Queen & Slim | Joseph S. DeBeasi (music editor) |
| 2019 | Waves | Sally Boldt, Johnnie Burn, Trey Edward Shults (music editors) |

=== 2020s ===
| Year | Film | Winners/Nominees |
|---|---|---|
| 2020 | Outstanding Achievement in Sound Editing – Feature Underscore | |
| 2020 | Tenet | Alex Gibson (supervising music editor); Nicholas Fitzgerald (music artist) |
| 2020 | The Invisible Man | Brett “Snacky” Pierce (supervising music editor); Devaughn Watts (sound effects editor) |
| 2020 | The Midnight Sky | Michael Alexander (supervising music editor); Peter Clarke (scoring editor) |
| 2020 | News of the World | Arabella Winter (supervising music editor); David Olson, Jim Weidman (music editors) |
| 2020 | Sound of Metal | Carolina Santana (supervising music editor); Nicolas Becker, Abraham Marder (scoring editors) |
| 2020 | The Trial of the Chicago 7 | Allegra de Souza (music editor) |
| 2020 | Wonder Woman 1984 | Gerard McCann, Ryan Rubin (supervising music editors); Michael Connell, Timeri Duplat (music editors); Chris Barrett, Adam Miller, Alfredo Pasquel (scoring editors) |
| 2021 | Outstanding Achievement in Sound Editing – Feature Music | |
| 2021 | West Side Story | Ramiro Belgardt, Joe E. Rand (music editors); David Channing (scoring editor) |
| 2021 | Dune | Clint Bennett, Ryan Rubin (supervising music editors); Peter Myles (music editor) |
| 2021 | Ghostbusters: Afterlife | Curt Sobel (supervising music editor) |
| 2021 | In the Heights | Jim Bruening, Jennifer Dunnington, Ben Holiday (music editors) |
| 2021 | The Matrix Resurrections | Gabriel Isaac Mounsey (supervising music editor); Hans Hafner, Jonathan Levi Shanes (music editors) |
| 2021 | Nightmare Alley | Clint Bennett, Kevin Banks (supervising music editors); Cecile Tournesac (scoring editors) |
| 2021 | A Quiet Place Part II | Nancy Allen, Ramiro Belgardt, Jim Schultz, Del Spiva (music editors) |
| 2021 | Tick, Tick... BOOM! | Nancy Allen, John Davis, Bri Holland (music editors) |
| 2022 | Outstanding Achievement in Music Editing – Feature Motion Picture | |
| 2022 | Elvis | Evan McHugh (music editor); Jamieson Shaw (supervising music editor); Chris Barrett (scoring editor) |
| 2022 | Everything Everywhere All at Once | Dean Menta, Luke Wilder, Katherine Gordon Miller (music editors) |
| 2022 | Guillermo del Toro's Pinocchio | Lewis Morison, Eric Caudieux (music editors); Chris Barret (scoring editor) |
| 2022 | Tár | Gerard McCann (supervising music editor) |
| 2022 | Whitney Houston: I Wanna Dance with Somebody | James Shirley, Victor Chaga (music editors); John Warhurst (supervising music editor); Nina Hartstone (supervising sound editor) |
| 2022 | Outstanding Achievement in Music Editing – Documentary | |
| 2022 | Moonage Daydream | Brett Morgen (music editor); John Warhurst (supervising music editor) |
| 2022 | Louis Armstrong's Black and Blues | Louie Schultz, Jordan Wiggins, Alex Carr-Engler (music editors) |
| 2022 | My Life as a Rolling Stone: Mick Jagger | Ben Newth, Nick Ashe (supervising music editors) |
| 2022 | The Way Down: "Revelations" | Richard David Brown (supervising music editor) |
