= David Bondelevitch =

American sound editor and re-recording mixer

- Born: Swampscott, Massachusetts
- Occupations: Re-recording mixer, sound editor
- Years active: 1981–present

David J. Bondelevitch MPSE, CAS is an American sound editor, re-recording mixer, composer, and educator. He has worked on more than 150 film and television projects and is a past president of the Motion Picture Sound Editors (MPSE). His credits include the Emmy-winning The Hunley (2000), the Peabody Award–winning documentary Southwest of Salem: The Story of the San Antonio Four (2016), and the Heartland Emmy–winning Above the Ashes (2011). He has received two Golden Reel Awards and more than 25 nominations.

== Early life and education ==
Bondelevitch was born in Swampscott, Massachusetts. He began playing trumpet at age nine, inspired by a television appearance by Louis Armstrong.

He earned two bachelor’s degrees in 1985: a Bachelor of Science in Art and Design from the Massachusetts Institute of Technology (MIT) and a Bachelor of Music in Jazz Composition from the Berklee College of Music, where he graduated magna cum laude. At MIT, he performed with the Festival Jazz Ensemble under Herb Pomeroy, winning two Outstanding Ensemble awards at the Notre Dame Collegiate Jazz Festival, and appeared with the MIT Symphony Orchestra at Carnegie Hall in a program including Stravinsky’s Rite of Spring. He went on to earn a Master of Fine Arts in Cinema Production from the USC School of Cinematic Arts in 1989.

=== Film and television ===
Bondelevitch began working professionally in the late 1980s. He received the Primetime Emmy Award for Outstanding Sound Editing for The Hunley (2000). In 1999, he won a Golden Reel Award for the IMAX documentary Island of the Sharks, and in 2001, another Golden Reel for the Showtime musical Ruby’s.

He won the George Foster Peabody Award as dialogue editor and re-recording mixer for Southwest of Salem: The Story of the San Antonio Four (2016), a documentary that has also won multiple festival prizes. His other credits include Battlestar Galactica (2005–2006), Strangers with Candy (2006), Two Weeks (2006), Tortilla Heaven (2007), Above the Ashes (2011), Jimmy Vestvood: Amerikan Hero (2016), Empty Net (2018), and El Vacío (2019), which was nominated for a News and Documentary Emmy Award.

Recent projects include Burning Sky (2021), a documentary on atomic testing, EcoQuest (2023), a climate change series pilot, and Touchy Feely (2025), an art film about haphephobia that premiered at the Phoenix Film Festival.

=== Music and composition ===
Bondelevitch has composed original music for films, conducted choral recording sessions, and collaborated with composers including Branford Marsalis, Randy Edelman, Mason Daring, Christopher Lennertz, and Alan Williams. His scholarly essay North by Northwest: A Case Study of the Bernard Herrmann Style is widely cited in film music studies and used in university curricula.

== Academic career ==
Bondelevitch joined the faculty of the USC School of Cinematic Arts in 1991, teaching courses in sound editing, mixing, and film music until 2008. In 2008, he became an Assistant Professor of Recording Arts at the University of Colorado Denver, where he was promoted to Associate Professor with tenure in 2013. He retired in 2023 and was named Associate Professor Emeritus.

At USC, he introduced the course "Directing the Composer," the school’s first course integrating film students with music students. At Denver, he designed and revised courses in audio post-production, music editing for visual media, surround mixing, and the history of film music.

== Professional service ==
Bondelevitch served as president of the Motion Picture Sound Editors from 2003 to 2005 and was on its board of directors from 1997 to 2023. He also served the Cinema Audio Society as Vice President (2006–2010), Secretary (2012–2019), and board member (2006–2023). He is an Honorary Lifetime Member of the MPSE and a regular contributor to both MPSE’s Wavelength and CAS’s Quarterly magazines.

He is additionally a member of the Television Academy, the Recording Academy, Film Independent, and the International Documentary Association.

== Selected filmography ==
- 2019 - El Vacio, Re-recording mixer and dialogue editor
- 2019 - Fresh Tracks, Re-recording mixer and sound designer
- 2018 - Empty Net, Re-recording mixer
- 2016 - Jimmy Vestvood: Amerikan Hero, Re-recording mixer and supervising sound editor
- 2016 - Southwest of Salem: The Story of the San Antonio Four, Re-recording mixer
- 2013 - Driven to Ride, Re-recording mixer and supervising sound editor
- 2011 - Above the Ashes, Re-recording mixer, sound editor and supervising sound editor
- 2009 - The Six Wives of Henry Lefay, Music editor
- 2007 - State of Mind, Music editor
- 2001 - Ruby's Bucket of Blood, Music editor
- 1999 - The Hunley, Music editor
- 1999 - Island of the Sharks, Music editor

== Awards and nominations ==
| Year | Result | Award | Category | Work | Ref. |
|---|---|---|---|---|---|
| 1988 | Nominated | Golden Reel Award | Best Sound Editing | Clash: The Last Soldier | |
| 1989 | Nominated | Golden Reel Award | Best Foley Editing | State of Fear | |
| 1996 | Nominated | Golden Reel Award | Best Sound Editing – Music in a Feature Film | The Quest | |
| 1998 | Nominated | Golden Reel Award | Best Sound Editing - Television Episodic - Music | Brimstone | |
| 1998 | Nominated | Golden Reel Award | Best Sound Editing - Television Movies of the Week - Music | The Christmas Wish | |
| 1999 | Nominated | Golden Reel Award | Best Sound Editing - Television Episodic - Music | Cold Feet | |
| 1999 | Nominated | Golden Reel Award | Best Sound Editing – Television Movies and Specials – Dialogue & ADR | The Simple Life of Noah Dearborn | |
| 1999 | Won | Golden Reel Award | Best Sound Editing - Special Venue | Island of the Sharks | |
| 2000 | Won | Primetime Emmy Award | Outstanding Sound Editing for a Limited Series, Movie, or Special | The Hunley | |
| 2000 | Nominated | Golden Reel Award | Best Sound Editing - Direct to Video - Sound Editorial | Stonebrook | |
| 2000 | Nominated | Golden Reel Award | Best Sound Editing - Television Movies and Specials - Music | Hendrix | |
| 2001 | Nominated | Golden Reel Award | Best Sound Editing - Music (Foreign & Domestic) | Black Knight | |
| 2001 | Won | Golden Reel Award | Best Sound Editing in Television - Music, Movies and Specials | Ruby's Bucket of Blood | |
| 2002 | Nominated | Golden Reel Award | Best Sound Editing – Direct to Video | Cowboy Up | |
| 2002 | Nominated | Golden Reel Award | Best Sound Editing in Television Long Form – Dialogue & ADR | Gleason | |
| 2002 | Nominated | Golden Reel Award | Best Sound Editing in Animated Features - Music | The Princess and the Pea | |
| 2002 | Nominated | Golden Reel Award | Best Sound Editing in Television Long Form - Music | Johnson County War | |
| 2003 | Nominated | Golden Reel Award | Best Sound Editing in Special Venue Film | Kilimanjaro | |
| 2003 | Nominated | Golden Reel Award | Best Sound Editing in a Feature - Music - Feature Film | Jeepers Creepers 2 | |
| 2004 | Nominated | Golden Reel Award | Best Sound Editing in Television Long Form - Music | A Separate Peace | |
| 2005 | Nominated | Golden Reel Award | Best Sound Editing in Television Short Form - Music | Battlestar Galactica | |
| 2006 | Nominated | Golden Reel Award | Best Sound Editing in Music for Television - Long Form | The Ten Commandments | |
| 2011 | Nominated | Golden Reel Award | Best Sound Editing - Short Form Documentary | Above the Ashes | |
| 2012 | Nominated | Heartland Emmy Awards | Best Sound Designer | Above the Ashes | |
| 2012 | Won | Heartland Emmy Awards | Documentary - Topical | Above the Ashes | |
