= Hell Week (Scream Queens) =

- Scream Queens episode
- Episode no.: Season 1 Episode 2
- Directed by: Brad Falchuk
- Written by: Ryan Murphy; Brad Falchuk; Ian Brennan
- Production code: 1AYD02
- Original air date: September 22, 2015
- Running time: 41 minutes

Guest appearances
- Ariana Grande as Chanel #2; Nick Jonas as Boone; Niecy Nash as Denise Hemphill; Jan Hoag as Ms. Bean; Breezy Eslin as Jennifer "Candle Vlogger"; Chelsea Ricketts as Amy; Anna Grace Barlow as Bethany; Grace Phipps as Mandy Greenwell; McKaley Miller as Sophia; Jeanna Han as Sam "Predatory Lez"; Anna Margaret as Coco; Jim Klock as Detective Chisolm; Deneen Tyler as Shondell; Evan Paley as Caulfield; Aaron Rhodes as Roger; Austin Rhodes as Dodger

Episode chronology
← Previous "Pilot"	Next → "Chainsaw"

"Hell Week" is the second episode of the horror black comedy series Scream Queens. It premiered on September 22, 2015, along with the "Pilot", as the special two hour premiere on Fox. The series focuses on a college that is rocked by a serial killer in a Red Devil costume. The episode was directed by Brad Falchuk, and was written by Falchuk with co-creators Ryan Murphy, and Ian Brennan.

The episode, along with the "Pilot", was watched by 4.04 million viewers and received mixed reviews from critics.

== Plot ==
Kappa Kappa Tau's "Hell Week" continues, as it welcomes Detective Chisolm (Jim Clock) and Denise Hemphill (Niecy Nash), the latter is a security guard hired by Gigi Caldwell (Nasim Pedrad) who has odd methods to protect the girls from the killer, and the former is an incompetent police detective who has a history with the dean. The Chanels still don't know what to do with Chanel #2 (Ariana Grande)'s body, and are worried that they will be blamed if someone finds it. Chanel #3 (Billie Lourd) and Chanel #5 (Abigail Breslin) propose to feed the body to pigs. Then, Hester (Lea Michele) walks in and suggests to put her in a food processor or to bone her, disturbing the others with her obsession with death. Chanel rejects all the ideas and decides to put the body in the same freezer where they put Ms. Bean (Jan Hoag)'s body. Hester promises to keep the secret of Number 2's death only if she can call Chanel "Mom". Grace (Skyler Samuels) is in the house basement, where she finds a mysterious locked door and tries to open it but Chanel #5 catches her and says that only Chanel has the key to that door. Grace tells Pete (Diego Boneta) about the secret door, who says that people have been said for years that the Kappa house has a really dark secret. This makes him think that Dean Cathy Munsch (Jamie Lee Curtis)'s office may have some archives that can explain that secret, so they both think at the same time that they will have to break in. They start kissing passionately but Grace stops him, saying that they can't kiss if there is a killer on the campus of Wallace University. They both agree that she will break into that secret door at Kappa house and he will break into the dean's office.

Media attention descends on Wallace University after the murder of a Kappa pledge, Tiffany, so Cathy's job is at risk. This problem increases when Grace's father, Wes Gardner (Oliver Hudson), wants to remove Grace from the school, because he fears that something could happen to her. A seductive Munsch convinces him to keep his daughter at school, but Wes demands to be hired as a professor so that he can keep an eye on her. After Grace breaks into the secret room in basement of the Kappa house, Chanel interrupts her and tells her that the room keeps Kappa's darkest secrets. Chanel proceeds to tell that a legend says that 20 years ago a girl died in a bathtub giving birth, that is now in that basement. She also reveals that Dean Munsch was supposedly the Dean in the story who knew about the death, but decided to cover it up to keep it from ruining her career. Despite Grace's comment that the story could be both real and the motive for the recent deaths, Chanel insists that it is nothing more than a scary story. After Chanel leaves, Grace asks herself who the baby is.

After having sex, Chanel realizes that her boyfriend Chad (Glen Powell) doesn't really love her so she breaks up with him. He furiously returns to his dormitory, with his roommate Boone (Nick Jonas). Boone says that he is scared because of the killer, so Chad lets him sleep with him, since they are best friends but clarifies that Boone will not try to touch him at night like in the past. Chanel, regretful, enters the room to fix her relationship with Chad, but walks in on them sharing a bed together and assumes that Chad is gay. After he explains that Boone was scared and nobody knows that Boone is gay, Chad breaks up with her for being too homophobic. Meanwhile, Pete got caught by the Red Devil during his break into Dean Munsch's office. He is tied up outside the building the next morning with a note "Mind Your Own Business", but still has the note that he found that read '1995 bathtub incident', followed by a list of names. Grace finds a Red Devil costume in his room and thinks Pete is the killer, but he explains that he has the costume because he is the school's mascot.

Boone tells Chanel that she doesn't have to tell everyone about his sexuality, because he wants to come out soon. He proposes that after he comes out, they accept him into Kappa, and Chanel likes the idea because that would give her a good reputation as the first girl who accepts a gay man in her sorority. Chanel #5 disagrees, and madly tells him off, but Boone leaves knowing that they will consider his idea. At night, after Denise and her friend Shondell (Deneen Tyler) fall asleep in their car outside of the Kappa house, Chanel gets attacked by the Red Devil but escapes. Denise hears her screams and runs to the house. The girls go upstairs to investigate, much to Denise's disapproval. Denise goes back to her car and finds Shondell dead. As Denise pushes Shondell's body out of the car and drives away, the girls find a message written on the wall that says "SLUTS WILL DIE". Inside the Dickie Dollar Scholars house, its members find a dead Boone laying on the dinner table with his throat cut. Chad and Denise interrupt the last dinner of Hell Week at Kappa, to announce that Shondell's body has disappeared and that Boone is dead. At the end of the episode, the Red Devil goes to the mortuary and opens a drawer which Boone's body is in. Boone opens his eyes and takes off the fake skin used to make his throat seem cut, revealing that he is an ally to the Red Devil.

== Production ==
On October 20, 2014, Fox Broadcasting Company announced that it had ordered a 15-episode season of Scream Queens, created by Ryan Murphy, Brad Falchuk and Ian Brennan who also co-created Glee. In December 2014, it was reported that Emma Roberts and Jamie Lee Curtis would be featured as series regulars. In January 2015, Lea Michele, Joe Manganiello, Keke Palmer, and Abigail Breslin joined the series' main cast, as well as actress/singer Ariana Grande in a recurring capacity. Later that month, The Hollywood Reporter confirmed that Nick Jonas would recur throughout the first season. In February 2015, newcomer Billie Lourd and Skyler Samuels joined the series' main cast. Later in the month, Niecy Nash joined the recurring cast as Denise, a kick-butt security guard; and British actor Lucien Laviscount, Diego Boneta and Glen Powell were confirmed as regulars. In March, Nasim Pedrad was cast as a series regular. On March 13, 2015, previously cast Manganiello was forced to depart the series, due to publicity obligations for his film Magic Mike XXL. Oliver Hudson was hired as his replacement. The series began principal photography on March 12, 2015, in New Orleans, Louisiana. Exterior campus scenes were shot at Tulane University. The show completed filming of the pilot episode in April 2015, with filming for the remaining first season installments commencing in early June 2015. Murphy, Brennan, and Falchuk were said to be the first season's sole directors; however, this was not true.

== Reception ==
=== Ratings ===
Along with "Pilot" as the two-hour series premiere, the episode was watched live by 4.04 million U.S. viewers and got a 1.7 rating/5 share in the adult 18-49 demographic.

=== Critical reception ===
"Hell Week", along with "Pilot", received mixed reviews from critics. Terri Schwartz from IGN stated that "Ryan Murphy has worked his TV magic again with a killer start to Scream Queens. From the acting to the costuming to the writing, everything about this concept and execution works. Scream Queens is as funny and self-aware as it needs to be to not bore audiences, but also offers up enough mystery and intrigue to keep even the biggest skeptic entertained," giving the episodes 9.7 out of 10. Melissa Maerz from Entertainment Weekly thought that "Scream Queens is flawed, but it’s worth watching, simply because there’s nothing easy about it. The casual brutality takes just as much work to think about as it does to watch. In a negative review, Ben Travers from Indiewire gave the two-hour premiere a C+ and added, "Scream Queens will be lucky if it survives its first season. Murphy may not be able to tell the difference, but modern TV audiences know how to spot a fake."
