= Alex Gibson (sound editor) =

American music and sound editor

- Occupations: music editor, sound editor
- Years active: 1990-present

Alex Gibson is an American music and sound editor, known for his work on films including Transformers, The Dark Knight Rises, Mad Max: Fury Road, Interstellar, Mission: Impossible – Rogue Nation, Terminator Genisys, Justice League, and Dunkirk, for which he won the Academy Award for Best Sound Editing at 90th Academy Awards. His other awards include a Primetime Emmy Award in 2008 for Outstanding Sound Editing for a Miniseries, Movie or a Special for the HBO miniseries John Adams, as well as a Grammy Award in 2009 for Best Score Soundtrack Album for a Motion Picture, Television or Other Visual Media for The Dark Knight. As a result, he is only one Tony Award away from an EGOT.
