= Pilot (Scream Queens) =

- Scream Queens episode
- Episode no.: Season 1 Episode 1
- Directed by: Ryan Murphy
- Written by: Ryan Murphy; Brad Falchuk; Ian Brennan
- Production code: 1AYD01
- Original air date: September 22, 2015
- Running time: 46 minutes

Guest appearances
- Ariana Grande as Sonya "Chanel #2" Herfmann; Nick Jonas as Boone Clemens; Breezy Eslin as Jennifer "Candle Vlogger"; Jeanna Han as Sam "Predatory Lez"; Jan Hoag as Agatha "Ms. Bean" Bean; Whitney Meyer as Tiffany "Deaf Taylor Swift" DeSalle; Brianne Howey as Melanie Dorkus; Chelsea Ricketts as Amy Meyer; Grace Phipps as Mandy Greenwell; Anna Grace Barlow as Bethany Stevens / Mary Mulligan; McKaley Miller as Sophia Doyle; Anna Margaret as Coco Cohen

Episode chronology
← Previous —	Next → "Hell Week"

"Pilot" is the pilot episode of the American black comedy horror television series Scream Queens. It had its world premiere at the 2015 Comic-Con, and premiered on September 22, 2015, along with the next episode, "Hell Week", as the special two-hour premiere on Fox. The series focuses on a college that is rocked by a serial killer in a Red Devil costume. The episode was directed by series creator Ryan Murphy, and was written by Murphy and his co-creators, Brad Falchuk, and Ian Brennan. Ariana Grande and Nick Jonas guest star as Chanel #2 and Boone Clemens.

The series premiere, along with the second episode, was watched by 4.04 million viewers and received mixed reviews from critics.

== Plot ==
=== 1995 ===
At a party in the Kappa Kappa Tau sorority house at Wallace University, Amy (Chelsea Ricketts) stumbles down the stairs with blood soaked hands and warns the current president Bethany Stevens (Anna Grace Barlow) and her friends Coco (Anna Margaret Collins) and Mandy (Grace Phipps) that something has happened upstairs in the bathroom. They enter the room only to find a postpartum Sophia Doyle (McKaley Miller) holding a baby. Disgusted, Bethany scolds Sophia before leaving the room to dance to "Waterfalls" by TLC instead of helping. When they come back, they are shocked to find Sophia dead and wonder how to cover the incident up.

=== 2015 ===
In modern day, Kappa Kappa Tau is ruled by the cruel, vain queen bee and ruthless president Chanel Oberlin (Emma Roberts) and her minions, whom she doesn't care enough to learn their names and just called them based on her own name; Chanel #2 (Ariana Grande), Chanel #3 (Billie Lourd), and Chanel #5 (Abigail Breslin), are the most popular and mean girls of the campus and the current residents of Kappa Kappa Tau. In the past, there was a Chanel #4, but she died of meningitis. Dean Cathy Munsch (Jamie Lee Curtis) hates sororities, especially Kappa, and won't let Kappa have the same system that it currently carries. She hates Chanel because she sees her as the example of what's wrong with girls these days. In her office, Munsch tells Chanel that she thinks that she was the one who injured the previous Kappa president, Melanie Dorkus (Brianne Howey), to get her position, but Chanel denies it. Munsch says that she's going to take Kappa down this year, starting by revoking their charter. Just then, Gigi Caldwell (Nasim Pedrad), president of the national chapter of Kappa Kappa Tau and a lawyer, walks in and says that Munsch is not allowed to revoke their charter. Chanel then threatens Cathy and exits. The dean then tells Gigi that Kappa won't have it easy this year and Gigi tells Cathy she has a suggestion. At the same time, Grace Gardner (Skyler Samuels) arrives at Wallace and has a tearful goodbye with her father, Wes Gardner (Oliver Hudson). She befriends her roommate, Zayday Williams (Keke Palmer) and they plan to pledge Kappa Kappa Tau, even though Zayday is hesitant.

At the "Rush Kappa" party, Cathy makes the announcement that Kappa will be required to accept anyone who wants to become a pledge. Shocked at the news, everybody leaves except for a few. Chanel is beyond mad to see the new pledges left. The only ones who stay are Grace and Zayday, along with; Hester Ulrich "Neckbrace" (Lea Michele), Tiffany DeSalle "Deaf Taylor Swift" (Whitney Meyer), and Sam "Predatory Lez" (Jeanna Han). Dean Munsch then introduces the Chanels to Jennifer (Breezy Eslin), another new pledge who terrifies Chanel with her candle vlogging hobby. Instead of comforting her, her boyfriend, Chad Radwell (Glen Powell) and his best friend Boone (Nick Jonas) tell her off by saying that he can't date her if she's no longer popular. Meanwhile, Chanel plans a prank to scare the pledges away that involves the Kappa Kappa Tau maid whom she treats poorly, Ms. Bean (Jan Hoag). She discuss the prank plan with Ms. Bean at the coffee shop where she has a heated argument with the barista, Pete Martínez (Diego Boneta) over Chanel's complex request for a Pumpkin Spice Latte. After that, Grace enters the coffee shop and meets Pete, whom after discovering that Grace wants to pledge Kappa Kappa Tau, warns her not to join Kappa Kappa Tau as 'everyone knows that terrible things happen in that house', but he is interrupted by Chanel, who revealed that Pete was her stalker since Chanel gave him fake hope for her own amusement. Grace assures Pete that she'll be fine.

Chanel and her minions start the prank to dunk Ms. Bean's face into the fryer. The prank goes horribly wrong when the fryer is actually on, burning Ms. Bean's face off and killing her. After a confrontation between Grace and Chanel, they all hide the body in the house's meat freezer. Later, Pete tells Grace he saw what they did, to which Grace replies that she wants to help him with his newspaper article exposing Kappa Kappa Tau's secrets. When they go to the freezer to see the body, Chanel and Chad arrive, forcing them to hide. Mysteriously, the body disappeared, much to Chanel's fear. The Chanels later have a blood oath to keep the incident a secret, but Chanel #2 backs out stating that she can't stay silent and fears that if someone were to find out, she couldn't be a network newscaster. She decides to pack her things and go home. While packing, someone in the Red Devil costume shows up at her room and dances with her until she is stabbed in the shoulder. Chanel #2 briefly stuns the Red Devil and goes to her computer to send out a tweet. The killer gets up and then murders #2, just as she sends out the tweet. The Chanels find her dead body later that night and decide to keep it in the room until they know what to do. "Hell Week" is about to begin for the pledges, but Grace and Chanel leave for coffee to discuss their leadership differences, which don't get resolved. Meanwhile, the rest of the pledges are forced by the Chanels to spend the night buried from neck to toe. The Red Devil appears riding a lawnmower and cuts Tiffany's head off, leaving the other girls screaming in horror.

== Production ==
On October 20, 2014, Fox Broadcasting Company announced that it had ordered a 15-episode season of Scream Queens, created by Ryan Murphy, Brad Falchuk and Ian Brennan who also co-created Glee. In December 2014, it was reported that Emma Roberts and Jamie Lee Curtis would be featured as series regulars. In January 2015, Lea Michele, Joe Manganiello, Keke Palmer, and Abigail Breslin joined the series' main cast, as well as actress/singer Ariana Grande in a recurring capacity. Later that month, The Hollywood Reporter confirmed that Nick Jonas would recur throughout the first season. In February 2015, newcomer Billie Lourd and Skyler Samuels joined the series' main cast. Later in the month, Niecy Nash joined the recurring cast as Denise, a kick-butt security guard; and British actor Lucien Laviscount, Diego Boneta and Glen Powell were confirmed as regulars, despite Laviscount doesn't make any appearance during this episode. In March, Nasim Pedrad was cast as a series regular. On March 13, 2015, previously cast Manganiello was forced to depart the series, due to publicity obligations for his film Magic Mike XXL. Oliver Hudson was hired as his replacement. The series began principal photography on March 12, 2015, in New Orleans, Louisiana. Exterior campus scenes were shot at Tulane University. The show completed filming of the pilot episode in April 2015, with filming for the remaining first season installments commencing in early June 2015. Murphy, Brennan, and Falchuk were said to be the first season's sole directors; however, this was not true.

== Featured music ==
The following is a list of songs featured in "Pilot".

- "What's A Girl To Do?" by Bat For Lashes
- "Waterfalls" by TLC
- "Warm In the Winter" by Glass Candy
- "A Thousand Years" by Christina Perri
- "I Know There's Something Going On" by Frida
- "Heart and Soul" by T'Pau
- "Hold Me Now" by Eden XO
- "If You Were Here" by Thompson Twins
- "Automatic" by The Pointer Sisters
- "Ever Really Loved a Woman" by Bryan Adams
- "Always" by Bon Jovi
- "Sunglasses At Night" by Corey Hart

== Reception ==
=== Ratings ===
Along with "Hell Week" as the two-hour series premiere, the Pilot was watched live by 4.04 million U.S. viewers and got a 1.7 rating/5 share in the adult 18-49 demographic.

=== Critical reception ===
"Pilot" received mixed reviews from critics. Terri Schwartz from IGN stated that "Ryan Murphy has worked his TV magic again with a killer start to Scream Queens. From the acting to the costuming to the writing, everything about this concept and execution works. Scream Queens is as funny and self-aware as it needs to be to not bore audiences, but also offers up enough mystery and intrigue to keep even the biggest skeptic entertained," giving the episodes 9.7 out of 10. Melissa Maerz from Entertainment Weekly thought that "Scream Queens is flawed, but it's worth watching, simply because there's nothing easy about it. The casual brutality takes just as much work to think about as it does to watch. In a negative review, Ben Travers from Indiewire gave the two-hour premiere a C+ and added, "Scream Queens will be lucky if it survives its first season. Murphy may not be able to tell the difference, but modern TV audiences know how to spot a fake.
