= Southwest of Salem: The Story of the San Antonio Four =

- Poster
- Directed by: Deborah Esquenazi
- Produced by: Deborah Esquenazi; Sam Tabet
- Edited by: Leah Marino; Liz Perlman
- Music by: Sam Lipman
- Production companies: Sam Tabet Pictures; Motto Pictures; Naked Edge Films
- Distributed by: Investigation Discovery; FilmRise
- Release dates: April 20, 2016 (Tribeca Film Festival); September 12, 2016
- Running time: 90 minutes
- Country: United States
- Language: English

Southwest of Salem: The Story of the San Antonio Four is a 2016 documentary directed by Deborah S. Esquenazi and produced by Sam Tabet about the persecution of four Latina lesbians in 1997 and 1998 who allegedly gang-raped two young girls. The story investigates the wrongful convictions of Elizabeth Ramirez, Cassandra Rivera, Kristie Mayhugh, and Anna Vasquez in the midst of the Satanic Panic witch-hunt era of the 1980s and 1990s.

== Description ==
In the summer of 1994, Elizabeth Ramirez, Cassandra Rivera, Kristie Mayhugh, and Anna Vasquez were accused of sexually assaulting the seven and nine year-old nieces of Elizabeth Ramirez in San Antonio, Texas. The four openly gay women were charged after a week-long visit from the nieces at Ramirez's apartment. The 19 and 20 year-olds were indicted in an environment of ubiquitous homophobia and the incorrect belief that homosexuals are naturally prone to sexually abusing children. The incident was speculated to be "satanic-related" and had no accurate forensic evidence to support it. All were sentenced to 15 years in prison with the exception of 22 year old Ramirez, the supposed "ringleader," who received a 37.5 year sentence. At the time, Ramirez was pregnant and was forced to give up her newborn baby several days after the start of her sentence. Anna and Cassandra were also partners in the midst of raising two children.

The film showcases the innocent women's fight for innocence and persistence throughout their nearly 15 years in prison. In 2012, one of the nieces admitted to having been pressured by her father, Javier Limon, to make the false accusations. Limon, Elizabeth's brother-in-law, had previously attempted to pursue Ramirez romantically, but his efforts were rejected. In 2013, a new law was introduced to Texas allowing individuals to challenge their convictions if there is new or changed scientific evidence. In Southwest of Salem Esquenazi follows the pivotal court hearing during which the women challenged their convictions, as well as the hearings that followed. Anna Vasquez was given parole in 2012 while the others were released on bail in 2013 with the assistance of the Innocence Project of Texas.

== Reception ==
In April 2016, Southwest of Salem: The Story of the San Antonio Four premiered at Tribeca Film Festival. In the months following, the documentary received critical acclaim and support among viewers who helped donate to the ACT NOW campaign to contact the District Attorney's office. Audiences also helped sign the #FreetheSA4 petition on Change.org which reached over 25,000 signatures by November. The documentary went on to receive several awards including:

- Marvin Louis Booker Shoes of Justice Award, DocuWest Film Festival Denver, CO (May 13, 2016)
- Documentary Feature Audience Award, OUTeast Film Festival Halifax, Nova Scotia (June 18. 2016)
- Outstanding Documentary Jury Award, Frameline LGBT Film Festival Centerpiece Doc San Francisco, CA (June 20, 2016)
- Outstanding Documentary Jury Award, Outfest LGBTQ Film Festival Los Angeles, CA (July 15, 2016)
- Audience Award Documentary Feature & Cheryl Maples Social Justice Ward, Kaleidoscope Film Festival; Opening Night Little Rock, AR (August 18, 2016)
- Audience Award for Best Documentary Feature, Southwest Gay and Lesbian Film Festival SWGLFF Albuquerque, NM (October 15, 2016)
- Best First Feature Documentary TV/Streaming, Broadcast Critics Choice Awards (November 3, 2016)
- Outstanding Documentary, 28th Annual GLAAD Media Awards (April 1, 2017)
- Peabody Award (April 18, 2017)

== Aftermath ==
On November 23, 2016, after the film gained attention and established itself as a key influencer in the case moving forward, the "San Antonio Four" were exonerated of all charges, with the film cited in the first paragraph of the court's opinion. "Those defendants have won the right to proclaim to the citizens of Texas that they did not commit a crime. That they are innocent. That they deserve to be exonerated," wrote Judge David Newell of the Texas Court of Criminal Appeals.

On December 3, 2018, the four women had their criminal records expunged and were offered monetary compensation from the state of Texas.
