= Latino Public Broadcasting =

American non-profit broadcaster

- Founded: 2005; 21 years ago
- Founder: Edward James Olmos
- Headquarters: Philadelphia, Pennsylvania, United States
- Key people: Noel C. Bloom
- Owner: Corporation for Public Broadcasting
- Website: www.lpbp.org

Latino Public Broadcasting (LPB) is a non-profit organization funded by the Corporation for Public Broadcasting with the purpose of addressing issues of cultural significance to the Latino population in the United States. It does this by funding the development, production, postproduction, acquisition and distribution of non-commercial educational and cultural television that addresses these issues. LPB television programs include dramas, documentaries (including the series Voces), comedies, satire and animation. These programs funded by the LPB are then distributed to various PBS stations and to other public telecommunication entities that choose to run their programs. LPB is also part of the National Minority Consortia, an organization composed of several minority public broadcasting organizations that wish to bring more diversity to public broadcasting.

== History ==
LPB was founded in 1998 by Edward James Olmos and Marlene Dermer. The latter served as the executive director until 2002 and currently sits on the board of directors. Edward Olmos currently serves as the chairman of the board of directors.
