= Deborah S. Esquenazi =

Documentary filmmaker, writer, radio producer, instructor, and investigative journalist

Deborah S. Esquenazi is an American documentary filmmaker, writer, radio producer, instructor, and investigative journalist. She is a native Texan and currently resides in Austin, Texas with her wife and two children. She is the acclaimed director of the award-winning documentary Southwest of Salem: The Story of the San Antonio Four, as well as half a dozen short films and essays. Her work focuses on the intersections of mythology & justice, and identity & power. Esquenazi is a Rockwood JustFilms Ford Foundation Fellow, Sundance Creative Producing Lab Fellow (2015), Firelight Media Producers’ Lab Fellow (2015), IFP Spotlight on Docs (2015), Artist on two Artplace America commissions (2015), and Sundance Documentary Film Fellow (2014).

== Career ==
Southwest of Salem: The Story of the San Antonio Four is Esquenazi's first feature-length film. It follows the story of four Latina lesbian women who were wrongfully convicted in the late 1990s for allegedly gang-raping two little girls in the midst of the homophobic “satanic-panic” era of the 1980s and 1990s. The film, which took an overall seven years to make, played a key role in the lives of the convicted women who spent nearly 15 years in prison, eventually leading to their exoneration in 2016 with the film cited in the first paragraph of the court's opinion. The film also played an important role in Esquenazi's own decision to come out at the age of 33 while making the film.

Esquenazi first heard about the story from friend and mentor Debbie Nathan. The filmmaker was struck by Elizabeth Ramirez's trial transcripts and a home VHS tape of the family, and decided to meet the women. After visiting the accused in prison and developing a strong connection to the story, Esquenazi set out to make the film and ultimately a difference in their lives. The original idea was to turn it into a radio piece, however it was not picked up by anyone. The story was then going to become a short film for Texas Monthly but faced challenges in funding.

The film went on to win several awards including Outstanding Documentary at the 28th GLAAD Media Awards as well as a 2017 Peabody Award.

She has also received funding from Humanities Texas, Sundance Institute, John D. and Catherine T. MacArthur Fund, Chicken & Egg Pictures, Astraea Global Arts Fund, Paul Robeson Fund for Independent media, and several others.
