= Music editor (filmmaking) =

Sound editor

The music editor is a type of sound editor in film or other multimedia productions (e.g. video or games) responsible for compiling, editing, and syncing music during the production of a soundtrack.

Among the music editor's roles is creating a "temp track", which is a "mock-up" of the film's soundtrack using pre-existing elements to use for editing, audience previews, and other purposes while the film's commissioned score is being composed.

One of the few courses dedicated solely to Temp Music was offered at Chapman University's Dodge College
