= Primetime Emmy Award for Outstanding Sound Editing for a Limited or Anthology Series, Movie or Special =

Television award category

- Awarded for: Outstanding Sound Editing for a Limited or Anthology Series, Movie or Special
- Country: United States
- Presented by: Academy of Television Arts & Sciences
- Currently held by: Beef (2026)
- Website: emmys.com

The Primetime Emmy Award for Outstanding Sound Editing for a Limited or Anthology Series, Movie or Special is an annual award presented as part of the Creative Arts Emmy Awards. Prior to 1976 and between 1979 and 1983, limited series and movies competed for Outstanding Achievement in Film Sound Editing.

In the following list, the first titles listed in gold are the winners; those not in gold are nominees, which are listed in alphabetical order. The years given are those in which the ceremonies took place:

== Winners and nominations ==
=== 1970s ===
Outstanding Achievement in Film Sound Editing for a Single Episode of a Regular or Limited Series

Year	Program	Episode	Nominees	Network
1976 (28th)
1976 (28th)	The Night That Panicked America		Charles L. Campbell, Lawrence E. Neiman, Colin C. Mouat, Larry Carow, Donald L. Warner Jr., John W. Singleton, Thomas McMullen, Joe Divitale, Carl Kress, John Kline, John Hanley	ABC
1976 (28th)	Eleanor and Franklin		Don Hall, William Hartman, Michael O'Corrigan, Ed Rossi, Dick Sperber, Ron Smith, John Jollife, Robert Pearson, John Kline, Allan LaMastra, Jay Engel	ABC
1976 (28th)	The Lindbergh Kidnapping Case		Marvin I. Kosberg, Larry Kaufman, Jack Milner, William M. Andrews	NBC

Outstanding Achievement in Film Sound Editing for a Special

Year	Program	Episode	Nominees	Network
1977 (29th)
1977 (29th)	Raid on Entebbe		Milton Burrow, Gene Eliot, Don Ernst, Tony Garber, Don V. Isaacs, Larry Kaufman, William Manger, A. David Marshall, Richard Oswald, Bernard F. Pincus, Edward L. Sandlin, Russ Tinsley	NBC
1977 (29th)	The Boy in the Plastic Bubble		Bruce Bell, William Jackson, William Phillips, Jerry Pirozzi, Jerry Rosenthal, John Strauss, James Yant	ABC
1977 (29th)	Eleanor and Franklin: The White House Years		Richard Harrison	ABC
1977 (29th)	The Quest		Bill Andrews, Lee Chaney, Buzz Cooper, Jack Finley, Dick Friedman, Stanley M. Gilbert, Doug Grindstaff, Bob Human, Don V. Isaacs, Al Kajita, Larry Kaufman, Marvin I. Kosberg, Jack Milner, Richard Raderman, Hank Salerno, Larry Singer	NBC
1978 (30th)	Outstanding Achievement in Film Sound Editing for a Special			
1978 (30th)	The Amazing Howard Hughes		Michael Corrigan, Donald Higgins, William Jackson, John Kline, Dick LeGrand, Jerry Pirozzi, Jerry Rosenthal, John Strauss, James Yant	CBS
1978 (30th)	The Dark Secret of Harvest Home		Robert A. Biggart, Jeffrey Bushelman, John Bushelman, Jeremy Hoenack, Bernard F. Pincus, Jerry Rosenthal, Edward L. Sandlin, Patrick Somerset	NBC
1978 (30th)	The Last Hurrah		Lee Chaney, Don Crosby, Doug Grindstaff, Bob Human, Don V. Isaacs, Al Kajita, Larry Kaufman, Steve Olson, Hank Salerno, Larry Singer	NBC
1978 (30th)	Standing Tall		Dwayne Avery, Tom Burke, Chick Camera, Don Hall	NBC
1978 (30th)	Tarantulas: The Deadly Cargo		Larry Carow, Pieter S. Hubbard, Chuck Moran, Colin Mouat, David Pettijohn, Fred Stafford, Gary Vaughan, Don Warner	CBS
1978 (30th)	To Kill a Cop		Lee Chaney, Christopher Chulack, Don Crosby, Mark Dennis, Doug Grindstaff, Don V. Isaacs, Hank Salerno, Larry Singer	NBC
1978 (30th)	Outstanding Achievement in Any Area of Technical Crafts			
1978 (30th)	Our Town		William F. Brownell, John Kantrowe	NBC

=== 1980s ===
Year	Program	Episode	Nominees	Network
1982 (35th)	Outstanding Individual Achievement - Creative Special Achievement (Note: As a juried award, nominees had to garner 50% approval to win the award. The nominee did not meet the benchmark and no award was given.)			
1982 (35th)	Marco Polo	"Part 4"	Jeff Bushelman, Steve Bushelman, Barney Cabral, William De Nicholas, Jere Golding, Bobbe Kurtz, Ian Macgregor-Scott, Lettie Odney, Patrick Somerset, Ascher Yates	NBC
1983 (36th)
1983 (36th)	The Executioner's Song		James Troutman, David D. Caldwell, Paul B. Clay, Paul Laune, Anthony Magro, Richard Raderman, Karen Rasch, Jeffrey L. Sandler, William Shenberg, Dan Thomas, Asher Yates, Charles McCann	NBC
1983 (36th)	The Blue and the Gray	"Part 1"	Joe Melody, Russ Tinsley, Tom Cornwell, David R. Elliott, Michael Hilkene, Fred Judkins, John Kline, Rusty Tinsley, Christopher T. Welch	CBS
1983 (36th)	Uncommon Valor		Christopher T. Welch, Russ Tinsley, Cathey Burrow, Greg Dillon, John Kline, William Manger	CBS
1983 (36th)	Who Will Love My Children?		Michael Hilkene, Russ Tinsley, Bill Jackson, Joseph A. Mayer, Jill Taggart, Rusty Tinsley, Ben Wong	ABC
1983 (36th)	The Winds of War	"Into the Maelstrom"	Keith Stafford, Richard Adams, Denis Dutton, James Fritch, Robert Gutknecht, Carl Mahakian, Lee Osborne, Bernard F. Pincus, Edward L. Sandlin, Ian MacGregor-Scott	ABC
1984 (37th)
1984 (37th)	The Day After		Christopher T. Welch, Brian Courcier, Greg Dillon, David R. Elliott, Michael Hilkene, Fred Judkins, Carl Mahakian, Joseph A. Mayer, Joe Melody, Catherine Shorr, Richard Shorr, Jill Taggart, Roy Prendergast	ABC
1984 (37th)	Flight 90: Disaster on the Potomac		Bill Wistrom, Sam Black, Doug Gray, Mace Matiosian, Bill Thiederman, David A. Whittaker, John Mick	NBC
1984 (37th)	Kenny Rogers as The Gambler: The Adventure Continues		Joseph A. Mayer, Brian Courcier, Dino Dimuro, Bill Jackson, John Kline, William Manger, Christopher T. Welch, Tom Carlin	CBS
1984 (37th)	A Streetcar Named Desire		James Troutman, David D. Caldwell, Terry Chambers, Russ Hill, Chris Jargo, Anthony Magro, Richard Raderman, Dan Thomas, Tally Paulos, Steve Livingston	ABC
1984 (37th)	V: The Final Battle	"Part 2"	Ron Tinsley, Alex Bamattre, Chick Camera, Lee Chaney, Larry Kaufman, Sid Lubow, Ralph Sandler, Corinne Sessarego, Jay Alfred Smith, Mark Southern	NBC
1985 (38th)
1985 (38th)	Wallenberg: A Hero's Story		Jeff Clark, Paul Timothy Carden, Nicholas Eliopoulos, Jeff Koford, Donald J. Malouf, Richard Raderman, Greg Stacy, Dan Thomas, James Troutman, Mike Virnig, Tally Paulos, John La Salandra	NBC
1985 (38th)	A Bunny's Tale		David R. Elliott, John Kline, Val Kuklowsky, Greg Schorer, Clive Smith, Rusty Tinsley, Jill Taggart, Curt Sobel	ABC
1985 (38th)	Children in the Crossfire		David R. Elliott, Dino Dimuro, Fred Judkins, John Kline, Clive Smith, Rusty Tinsley, Scott A. Tinsley, Russ Tinsley, Allan K. Rosen	NBC
1985 (38th)	Embassy		David R. Elliott, Dino Dimuro, Mark Friedgen, Fred Judkins, John Kline, Greg Schorer, Clive Smith, Rusty Tinsley, Scott A. Tinsley, Denise Whiting, Eugene Marks	ABC
1985 (38th)	Space	"Part 5"	Lon Bender, Wylie Stateman, Terry Lynn Allen, David Bartlett, Jill Demby, John Duffy, Cameron Frankley, Avram D. Gold, Randy Kelley, Elliott Koretz, Bobbe Kurtz, Cliff Latimer, Mark Stoeckinger, Joseph A. Mayer, Stan Gilbert, Stephen M. Rowe	CBS
1986 (39th)
1986 (39th)	Under Siege		David R. Elliott, Dino Dimuro, Mark Friedgen, G. Michael Graham, Larry Kemp, Joseph A. Mayer, Joe Melody, Stewart Nelsen, Greg Schorer, Eric Scott, Rusty Tinsley, Scott A. Tinsley, Skip Williams, Russ Tinsley, Daniel Allan Carlin	NBC
1986 (39th)	Alice in Wonderland	"Part 2"	Joe Melody, Dino Dimuro, David R. Elliott, Mark Friedgen, Anthony Ippolito, Larry Kemp, John Kline, Greg Schorer, Rusty Tinsley, Scott A. Tinsley, Joseph A. Mayer, Erma E. Levin	CBS
1986 (39th)	Dallas: The Early Years		David D. Caldwell, Irwin Cadden, Terry Chambers, Stuart Chasmar, Brian Courcier, Rick Crampton, Dan Finnerty, Donald Flick, Don Higgins, Ted Johnston, James Koford, Ingeborg Larson, Linda Moss, Lorie O'Shatz, Greg Stacy, Dick Vandenberg, Mike Virnig, Tally Paulos, Patricia Peck	CBS
1986 (39th)	North and South	"Part 2"	Ron Tinsley, Andre Bacha, Alex Bamattre, Stu Bernstein, Lee Chaney, Vincent Connelly, Gene Eliot, Larry Kaufman, Sid Lubow, Walter Newman, Corinne Sessarego, Stephen A. Hope	ABC
1986 (39th)	North and South, Book II	"Part 6"	James Troutman, Terry Chambers, Brian Courcier, Jim De Roos, Ed Fassl, Dan Finnerty, Dan Mandel, Richard Raderman, Greg Stacy, Dick Vandenberg, Art Ottinger, Stephen A. Hope	ABC
1986 (39th)	Peter the Great	"Part 1"	James Troutman, David D. Caldwell, Terry Chambers, Brian Courcier, Dan Finnerty, James Koford, Linda Moss, Richard Raderman, Greg Stacy, Marty Stein, Mike Virnig, Paul B. Clay, Dan Carlin Sr.	NBC
1987 (39th)
1987 (39th)	Unnatural Causes		Vince Gutierrez, William H. Angarola, Clark Conrad, Doug Gray, Mace Matiosian, Anthony Mazzei, Michael J. Mitchell, Matt Sawelson, Edward F. Suski, James Wolvington, Barbara Issak, Jon Johnson, Dan Carlin Sr.	NBC
1987 (39th)	Fresno	"Part 4"	Bill Wistrom, William H. Angarola, Clark Conrad, Steve Dutkovich, Ken Gladden, Doug Gray, John Haeny, Jay Jones, Anthony Mazzei, Steve Pederson, Matt Sawelson, Brad Sherman, Edward F. Suski, James Wolvington, Bill Thiederman, Jon Johnson, Dan Carlin Sr.	CBS
1987 (39th)	Hero in the Family		Gary Winter, Ray Alba, Allan Bromberg, John M. Colwell, Joe Divitale, Robert Gutknecht, Larry Mann, Michael O'Corrigan, Jim Siracusa, Kendrick Sweet, Craig Vandagriff, Cliff Bell Jr., Roy Prendergast	ABC
1987 (39th)	Little Spies		Gary Winter, Joe Divitale, Robert Gutknecht, William Hooper, William Jacobs, Larry Mann, Michael O'Corrigan, Steve Olson, Kendrick Sweet, Bill Young, Cliff Bell Jr., Kathy Durning	ABC
1987 (39th)	Out on a Limb	"Part 2"	David R. Elliott, Dino Dimuro, Mark Friedgen, G. Michael Graham, Joe Melody, Stewart Nelsen, Rusty Tinsley, Scott A. Tinsley, Michael C. Gutierrez, Bill Voigtlander, John Mick	ABC
1988 (40th)
1988 (40th)	The Murder of Mary Phagan		Rich Harrison, Tom Cornwell, Peter Harrison, Thomas McMullen, Stan Siegel, Tally Paulos, Allan K. Rosen	NBC
1988 (40th)	Earth Star Voyager	"Part 2"	Joe Melody, Rusty Beith, Dino Dimuro, Golden Felton, Mark Friedgen, G. Michael Graham, Lenny Jennings, A. David Marshall, Dave McMoyler, Greg Schorer, Scott A. Tinsley, Michael C. Gutierrez, John Mick, Mark Steele, Gary Macheel	ABC
1988 (40th)	The Return of the Shaggy Dog	"Part 2"	Gary Winter, Dick Wahrman, John Kline, Craig Vandagriff, Joe Divitale, Allan Bromberg, Ed Osborne, Cliff Bell Jr., Jamie Forester	ABC
1988 (40th)	Save the Dog!		Gary Winter, Jack A. Finlay, William Hooper, John Kline, Thomas McMullen, Michael O'Corrigan, Gary Vaughan, Dick Wahrman, Bill Young, Craig Vandagriff, Cliff Bell Jr., Kathleen Bennett	Disney Channel
1988 (40th)	The Taking of Flight 847: The Uli Derickson Story		Dwayne Avery, Duncan Burns, Terry Chambers, Jeff Clark, Michael P. Cook, Ed Fassl, Adam Johnston, James Koford, Carin Rogers, Skip Williams, David Lewis Yewdall, Jerry Jacobson, Gail Clark Burch, Steve Livingston	NBC
1989 (41st)
1989 (41st)	Lonesome Dove	"The Plains"	Dave McMoyler, Joe Melody, Mark Steele, Richard S. Steele, Michael J. Wright, Gary Macheel, Stephen Grubbs, Mark Friedgen, Charles R. Beith Jr., Scott A. Tinsley, Karla Caldwell, George Bell, G. Michael Graham, Kristi Johns, Tom Villano, Jamie Forester	CBS
1989 (41st)	David		Stephen Grubbs, Randal S. Thomas, David Scharf, Gary S. Gelfand, Joseph A. Johnston, Ken Gladden, Terence Thomas, Andre Caporaso, Phil Jamtaas, Brian Risner, Sam Black, Richard C. Allen	ABC
1989 (41st)	Go Toward the Light		David Hankins, Pat McCormick, Richard Taylor, Matt Sawelson, Joel Valentine, Bobby Mackston, Brian Thomas Nist, Steve Dutkovich, Steve Livingston, Ken Johnson	CBS
1989 (41st)	Steal the Sky		Dave McMoyler, Joe Melody, Mark Friedgen, G. Michael Graham, Gary Macheel, A. David Marshall, Diane Marshall, Mark Steele, Rusty Tinsley, Scott A. Tinsley, Charles R. Beith Jr., Christopher Assells, Kristi Johns, Allan K. Rosen	HBO
1989 (41st)	War and Remembrance	"Part 7"	Michael O'Corrigan, Gary Winter, John Kaufman, Robert Gutknecht, Thomas McMullen, William Hooper, Richard Wahrman, Sam Gemette, John M. Colwell, Jim Siracusa, Craig Vandagriff, Ray Alba, William Jacobs, Steve Olson, Bill Young, Joe Divitale, John Kline, Cliff Bell Jr., Chris Ledesma	ABC

=== 1990s ===
Year	Program	Episode	Nominees	Network
1990 (42nd)
1990 (42nd)	Challenger		Vince Gutierrez, Randal S. Thomas, Ken Gladden, Mace Matiosian, Joseph A. Johnston, T.W. Davis, Doug Gray, John S. Orr, Gary S. Gelfand, Andre Caporaso, Russell Brower, David Scharf, Phil Jamtaas, John Caper Jr.	CBS
1990 (42nd)	Family of Spies		Burton Weinstein, Michael C. Gutierrez, Randal S. Thomas, Joseph A. Johnston, Ken Gladden, George R. Groves Jr., Phil Jamtaas, Sam Black, Andre Caporaso, Clark Conrad, Gary S. Gelfand, John S. Orr, David Scharf, Terence Thomas, T.W. Davis, Abby Treloggen	NBC
1990 (42nd)	Drug Wars: The Camarena Story	"Part 3"	John A. Larsen, Brian Thomas Nist, Pat McCormick, Brad Sherman, H. Jay Levine, Fred Cipriano, Michael Tomack, Ralph Osborn III, Bruce P. Michaels, James Hebenstreit, Matt Sawelson, Richard Marx, Richard C. Allen	NBC
1990 (42nd)	The Old Man and the Sea		Stephen Grubbs, Randal S. Thomas, David Scharf, Gary S. Gelfand, Joseph A. Johnston, Ken Gladden, Terence Thomas, Andre Caporaso, Phil Jamtaas, Brian Risner, Sam Black, Richard C. Allen	NBC
1991 (43rd)
1991 (43rd)	Son of the Morning Star	"Part 2"	G. Michael Graham, Joe Melody, Richard S. Steele, Mark Steele, Gary Macheel, Charles R. Beith Jr., Mark Friedgen, Dan Luna, Michael J. Wright, Bob Costanza, Christopher Assells, Dave McMoyler, Bill Bell, Scott A. Tinsley, Phil Jamtaas, Andre Caporaso, Stephen Grubbs, Kristi Johns, John Caper Jr.	ABC
1991 (43rd)	Ironclads		Burton Weinstein, Stephen Grubbs, Clark Conrad, Craig M. Otte, Terence Thomas, Randal S. Thomas, Andre Caporaso, Phil Jamtaas, Brian Risner, James Wolvington, Mace Matiosian, Lori Slomka	TNT
1991 (43rd)	Paris Trout		Dave Weathers, Matt Sawelson, James Hebenstreit, Brad Sherman, Adam Sawelson, Ralph Osborn, Brian Thomas Nist, Frank A. Fuller Jr., John Voss Bonds Jr., Peter Bergren, Bruce P. Michaels, Erma E. Levin	Showtime
1991 (43rd)	Separate But Equal	"Part 1"	David Hankins, Brian Thomas Nist, John Haeny, Peter Bergren, Ralph Osborn, Joe Earle, John Voss Bonds Jr., Brad Sherman, Adam Sawelson, Matt Sawelson, Frank A. Fuller Jr., Bruce P. Michaels, Joanie Diener	ABC
1992 (44th)
1992 (44th)	Crash Landing: The Rescue of Flight 232		Stephen Grubbs, Randal S. Thomas, Clark Conrad, Gary S. Gelfand, Terence Thomas, Joseph A. Johnston, David Scharf, Craig M. Otte, Andre Caporaso, Phil Jamtaas, Stan Jones	ABC
1992 (44th)	Cast a Deadly Spell		David Hankins, Brian Thomas Nist, Peter Bergren, Pat McCormick, Richard F.W. Davis, Matt Sawelson, Adam Sawelson, Joe Earle, James Hebenstreit, Ralph Osborn, Dave Weathers, Bruce P. Michaels, Lise Richardson	HBO
1992 (44th)	Conagher		Joe Melody, Scott A. Tinsley, Mark Steele, Richard S. Steele, Gary Macheel, Bob Costanza, Dan Luna, Michael J. Wright, T.W. Davis, Kristi Johns	TNT
1992 (44th)	I'll Fly Away	"Pilot"	Richard Taylor, Michael C. Gutierrez, Brian Thomas Nist, Matt Sawelson, H. Jay Levine, Peter Bergren, John Voss Bonds Jr., Frank A. Fuller Jr., Joe Earle, James Hebenstreit, Peter Austin, Gary S. Gelfand, Randal S. Thomas, Adam Sawelson, Ralph Osborn, Albert Edmund Lord III, Bruce P. Michaels, Dave Weathers, Patty von Arx, Allan K. Rosen	NBC
1992 (44th)	Wedlock		Dave Weathers, Anthony Mazzei, Joe Earle, Frank A. Fuller Jr., Brian Thomas Nist, John Voss Bonds Jr., Peter Bergren, John Haeny, Matt Sawelson, Adam Sawelson, James Hebenstreit, Gary Lewis, Ralph Osborn, H. Jay Levine, Albert Edmund Lord III, Bruce P. Michaels, Richard Whitfield, Carlton Kaller	HBO
1993 (45th)
1993 (45th)	The Fire Next Time	"Part 1"	Charles R. Beith Jr., Philip A. Hess, Bill Bell, David C. Eichhorn, Tim Terusa, Rusty Tinsley, Scott Eilers, Mark Steele, Richard S. Steele, G. Michael Graham, Mark Friedgen, Gary Shinkle, Gary Macheel, Mike Dickeson, Dan Luna, Kristi Johns, J. Michael Hooser, Bob Costanza, Roy Prendergast, Gerry Rothschild	CBS
1993 (45th)	Alex Haley's Queen	"Part 3"	G. Michael Graham, Mark Steele, Stuart Calderon, Richard S. Steele, Rick Crampton, Tim Terusa, John Voss Bonds Jr., Bob Costanza, Mike Dickeson, Gary Macheel, Mark Friedgen, Bill Bell, Dan Luna, Phil Jamtaas, J. Michael Hooser, Todd Kasow	CBS
1993 (45th)	The Positively True Adventures of the Alleged Texas Cheerleader-Murdering Mom		Joe Melody, Tim Terusa, Gary Macheel, Richard S. Steele, Bob Costanza, David C. Eichhorn, Bill Bell, Rusty Tinsley, Mike Dickeson, Dan Luna, Kristi Johns, Allan K. Rosen	HBO
1993 (45th)	Stalin		G. Michael Graham, Mark Friedgen, Tim Terusa, Philip A. Hess, Bill Bell, Greg Schorer, David C. Eichhorn, Rusty Tinsley, Charles R. Beith Jr., Scott Eilers, Gary Shinkle, Richard S. Steele, Mark Steele, Bob Costanza, Dan Luna, Michael J. Wright, Gary Macheel, J. Michael Hooser, A. David Marshall, Kristi Johns, Peter Davies	HBO
1993 (45th)	Stephen King's The Tommyknockers	"Part 2"	Richard Taylor, Peter Austin, David Beadle, Peter Bergren, Ken Gladden, Sonya Henry, Gary Lewis, Myron Nettinga, Brian Thomas Nist, Adam Sawelson, Matt Sawelson, Bruce Tanis, James Hebenstreit, Albert Edmund Lord III, Marty Wereski	ABC
1994 (46th)
1994 (46th)	Heart of Darkness		Joe Melody, Kristi Johns, Gary Macheel, David C. Eichhorn, A. David Marshall, Mike Dickeson, Bob Costanza, Scott Eilers, Tim Terusa, Rusty Tinsley, Richard S. Steele, Mark Steele, Bill Bell, Allan K. Rosen, Jill Schachne, Tim Chilton	TNT
1994 (46th)	Geronimo		Charles R. Beith Jr., J. Michael Hooser, Bill Bell, Bob Costanza, Rick Crampton, Stuart Calderon, Mike Dickeson, David C. Eichhorn, Gary Macheel, Richard S. Steele, Mark Steele, Tim Terusa, Darren Wright, Allan K. Rosen, Patty von Arx, Jill Schachne, Tim Chilton	TNT
1994 (46th)	Gypsy		Greg Schorer, J. Michael Hooser, Bob Costanza, Mike Dickeson, Gary Macheel, Richard S. Steele, Mark Steele, Rick Crampton, David C. Eichhorn, Rusty Tinsley, Stuart Calderon, Gary Shinkle, Scott Grusin, Chris Ledesma, Sally Boldt, Jill Schachne, Tim Chilton, Sharon Michaels, Joseph Malone, Joe Bennett, Tim Terusa	CBS
1994 (46th)	Oldest Living Confederate Widow Tells All		David Hankins, David Beadle, Peter Bergren, Joseph H. Earle, Linda Keim, Gary Lewis, Myron Nettinga, Adam Sawelson, Matt Sawelson, Bruce P. Michaels, James Hebenstreit, Albert Edmund Lord III, Marty Wereski, Patricia Nedd, Alyson Dee Moore	CBS
1994 (46th)	To Dance with the White Dog		Michael O'Corrigan, Ian MacGregor-Scott, Sam Gemette, Jim Yant, John M. Colwell, Steve Olson, Joe Divitale, Karyn Foster, Sarah Goldsmith, John F. Reynolds, Terry Delsing, Gail Steele, Evelyn Dutton	CBS
1994 (46th)	White Mile		Charles R. Beith Jr., Bob Costanza, Rick Crampton, Mike Dickeson, Steffan Falesitch, Gary Macheel, Mark Steele, Richard S. Steele, Tim Terusa, Craig Clark, Peter Harrison, David C. Eichhorn, Tom Cornwell, J. Michael Hooser, Bill Bell, Ernesto Mas, Stan Jones, Jill Schachne, Tim Chilton	HBO
1995 (47th)
1995 (47th)	Tom Clancy's OP Center	"Part 1"	Joe Melody, G. Michael Graham, J. Michael Hooser, Mark Friedgen, Mark Steele, Richard S. Steele, Anton Holden, Bob Costanza, Mike Dickeson, Darren Wright, John K. Adams, Mark R. La Pointe, Rusty Tinsley, Tim Terusa, Rick Crampton, Gary Macheel, Scott A. Tinsley, Bill Bell, Allan K. Rosen, Patty von Arx, Tim Chilton, Jill Schachne	NBC
1995 (47th)	Buffalo Girls	"Part 1"	G. Michael Graham, Joe Melody, J. Michael Hooser, Anton Holden, Mike Dickeson, Tim Terusa, Darren Wright, John K. Adams, Bob Costanza, Mark Steele, Gary Macheel, Rusty Tinsley, Richard S. Steele, Rick Crampton, Bill Bell, Tim Chilton, Jill Schachne, Stan Jones, Mark Heyes	CBS
1995 (47th)	Children of the Dust	"Part 1"	David Hankins, James Hebenstreit, Eric Erickson, Peter Austin, Benjamin Beardwood, Gary Lewis, Ralph Osborn, Adam Sawelson, Peter Bergren, Margaret Carlton, Joe Earle, Linda Keim, Myron Nettinga, Brian Thomas Nist, Bruce Tanis, Marty Wereski, Alyson Dee Moore, Patricia Nedd	CBS
1995 (47th)	In Search of Dr. Seuss		Peter Austin, Albert Edmund Lord III, David Beadle, Ron Evans, Dennis Gray, Sonya Henry, Ralph Osborn, Adam Sawelson, Peter Bergren, James Hebenstreit, Brian Thomas Nist, Bruce Tanis, Joe Earle, Nancy Parker, Pamela Kahn	TNT
1995 (47th)	Joseph	"Part 1"	G. Michael Graham, Joe Melody, Kristi Johns, Tim Terusa, David C. Eichhorn, Anton Holden, Rusty Tinsley, Rick Crampton, Mark Steele, John K. Adams, Bob Costanza, Mike Dickeson, Darren Wright, Gary Macheel, Richard S. Steele, Bill Bell, Tim Chilton, Jill Schachne	TNT
1995 (47th)	See Jane Run		Michael O'Corrigan, Vince Gutierrez, David B. Cohn, David M. Cowan, John Chalfant, Marla McGuire, Harry Cheney, Paul J. Diller, Devin Joseph, Gary Friedman, Jay Keiser, Andre Caporaso, Terry Delsing, Adam De Coster, Michael Broomberg	ABC
1996 (48th)
1996 (48th)	The Tuskegee Airmen		G. Michael Graham, Joe Melody, Anton Holden, Bob Costanza, Tim Terusa, Mike Dickeson, Mark Steele, Darren Wright, Michael Lyle, Gary Macheel, John K. Adams, Richard S. Steele, Mark Friedgen, Bill Bell, Kristi Johns, Stan Jones, Mark Heyes, Jill Schachne, Tim Chilton	HBO
1996 (48th)	Dead by Sunset	"Part 1"	David B. Cohn, Jean-Marie Mitchell, Marla McGuire, Mike Boden, Kevin Wahrman, Scott Wolf, Harry Cheney, Amy Morrison, Devin Joseph, Brian Connell, Virginia S. Ellsworth, Timothy Pearson	NBC
1996 (48th)	Larry McMurtry's Streets of Laredo		Joe Melody, J. Michael Hooser, Tim Terusa, Bob Costanza, Anton Holden, Mike Dickeson, G. Michael Graham, Bill Bell, Mark Steele, Richard S. Steele, Gary Macheel, Rick Crampton, Darren Wright, David C. Eichhorn, Lori Slomka, Tim Chilton, Jill Schachne	CBS
1996 (48th)	Peter Benchley's The Beast		Richard LeGrand Jr., Harry E. Snodgrass, Norval D. Crutcher III, Robert Ulrich, William Hooper, Bob McNabb, Walter Spencer, William Jacobs, Gary S. Gerlich, Elliott Koretz, Stan Jones	NBC
1996 (48th)	The Rockford Files: Godfather Knows Best		Norval D. Crutcher III, Lydian Tone, Tom Jaeger, Steve Burger, Rich Cusano, Cindy Rabideau, Stacey Nakasone, Richard Webb, Andrew Spencer Dawson, Jeffrey Kaplan, Robb Navrides, Kyle Wright, John O. Robinson III, Michael Gollom, Patty Morena, Patty McGettigan	CBS
1997 (49th)
1997 (49th)	Stephen King's The Shining	"Part 3"	Thomas DeGorter, Peter Bergren, Kenneth L. Johnson, Brian Thomas Nist, Joe Earle, Bradley C. Katona, Eric A. Norris, Andrew Ellerd, Linda Keim, Bruce Tanis, Ron Evans, Gary Lewis, Barbara Issak, Paul Longstaffe, James Hebenstreit, Stan Jones, Alyson Dee Moore, Ginger Geary	ABC
1997 (49th)	The Cherokee Kid		Ron Evans, Ralph Osborn, Eric A. Norris, David Hankins, Nancy Parker, Dean Richard Marino, Dennis Gray, Myron Nettinga, Bruce Tanis, Alyson Dee Moore, Laura Laird	HBO
1997 (49th)	Crazy Horse		James N. Harrison, Rich Harrison, Tom Cornwell, Charles Dayton, Peter Harrison, Rick Hinson, Tally Paulos, Gregg Barbanell, Michael Broomberg, Virginia S. Ellsworth	TNT
1997 (49th)	David	"Part 1"	Bill Bell, Kristi Johns, Anton Holden, Adriane Marfiak, Michael Lyle, Bob Costanza, Mark Steele, Robert Webber, Gary Macheel, Rusty Tinsley, Lou Thomas, Tim Terusa, David C. Eichhorn, Richard S. Steele, Tim Chilton, Jill Schachne, Sharon Smith, Jack Levy	TNT
1997 (49th)	William Faulkner's Old Man		Stephen Grubbs, Marty Wereski, David Scharf, Charles Bruce, Jay Keiser, Kevin Fisher, Phil Jamtaas, Adam De Coster, Paige Pollack	CBS
1998 (50th)
1998 (50th)	Rough Riders	"Part 2"	G. Michael Graham, Greg Schorer, Kristi Johns, Suzanne Angel, Bill Bell, Mark Friedgen, Bob Costanza, Robert Webber, Gary Macheel, Richard S. Steele, Lou Thomas, Adriane Marfiak, Anton Holden, Michael Lyle, David C. Eichhorn, Mark Steele, Tim Terusa, Rusty Tinsley, Kim Naves, Tim Chilton, Jill Schachne	TNT
1998 (50th)	The Day Lincoln Was Shot		G. Michael Graham, Kristi Johns, Anton Holden, Bob Costanza, Rick Crampton, Robert Webber, Richard S. Steele, Lou Thomas, Oliver Barth, Gary Macheel, Adriane Marfiak, Mark Steele, Tim Terusa, Rusty Tinsley, Jeff Charbonneau, Tim Chilton, Jill Schachne	TNT
1998 (50th)	Don King: Only in America		J. Paul Huntsman, Gloria D'Alessandro, Carin Rogers, George Nemzer, Timothy A. Cleveland, Mark L. Mangino, Paul J. Diller, Michael E. Lawshe, Karyn Foster, Terry Wilson, Dale W. Perry, Joseph T. Sabella	HBO
1998 (50th)	From the Earth to the Moon	"Can We Do This?"	Richard Taylor, Barbara Issak, Brian Thomas Nist, Joe Earle, Christopher Brooks, Jerry Edemann, David Melhase, James A. Williams, Benjamin Beardwood, Dennis Gray, Alyson Dee Moore, Patricia Nedd	HBO
1998 (50th)	Merlin	"Part 1"	Tim Lewiston, John Ireland	NBC
1998 (50th)	Peter Benchley's Creature	"Part 1"	William H. Angarola, Ray Spiess, Rick Hinson, Cindy Rabideau, Robert Guastini, Mark Cleary, Anna MacKenzie, Jason Lezama, Mike Marchain, Raymond E. Spiess III, Steve Bissinger, Aaron Martin, Ellen Heuer, Craig Ng	ABC
1999 (51st)
1999 (51st)	Stephen King's Storm of the Century	"Part 2"	Richard Taylor, David Melhase, Benjamin Beardwood, Dennis Gray, Paul Longstaffe, Ralph Osborn III, Peter Austin, Barbara Issak, Eric A. Norris, Brian Thomas Nist, Andrew Ellerd, Kenneth L. Johnson, Bradley C. Katona, Gary Krause, Joe Earle, Sherry Whitfield, Nancy Parker, Patricia Nedd	ABC
1999 (51st)	Houdini		William H. Angarola, Rick Hinson, Anna MacKenzie, Ray Spiess, Mike Marchain, Skip Adams, Robert Guastini, Cindy Rabideau, Jeanette Surga, Zane D. Bruce, Joseph T. Sabella	TNT
1999 (51st)	Purgatory		Mark Friedgen, G. Michael Graham, Suzanne Angel, William C. Carruth, Bill Bell, Bob Costanza, Mike Dickeson, Anton Holden, Tim Terusa, Adriane Marfiak, Michael Lyle, Gary Macheel, Mark Steele, Richard S. Steele, Lou Thomas, Allan K. Rosen, Tim Chilton, Jill Schachne	TNT
1999 (51st)	A Soldier's Sweetheart		William H. Angarola, Rick Hinson, Anna MacKenzie, Raymond E. Spiess III, Cindy Rabideau, Mike Marchain, Jason Lezama, Robert Guastini, Ray Spiess, Ron Finn, Christopher Moriana, Katie Rowe	Showtime
1999 (51st)	Tom Clancy's NetForce	"Part 1"	G. Michael Graham, William C. Carruth, Mark Friedgen, Bill Bell, Anton Holden, Mike Dickeson, Scott A. Tinsley, Rick Crampton, David C. Eichhorn, Richard S. Steele, Rusty Tinsley, Adriane Marfiak, Gary Macheel, Tim Terusa, Lou Thomas, Marc Caruso, Tim Chilton, Jill Schachne	ABC

=== 2000s ===
Year	Program	Episode	Nominees	Network
2000 (52nd)
2000 (52nd)	The Hunley		G. Michael Graham, Suzanne Angel, Anton Holden, Bill Bell, Bob Costanza, Gary Macheel, Lou Thomas, Tim Terusa, Mike Dickeson, Michael Lyle, Rick Crampton, Richard S. Steele, Robert Webber, Rusty Tinsley, David Bondelevitch, Tim Chilton, Jill Schachne	TNT
2000 (52nd)	Animal Farm		Nigel Heath, James Feltham, Julian Slater, Diane Greaves, Jason Swanscott, Arthur Graley	TNT
2000 (52nd)	The Crossing		Christopher Sheldon, Jim Borgardt, Charles W. Ritter, Willy Allen, Dane Davis, Sherry Whitfield, Jerry Trent, Andrew Lackey	A&E
2000 (52nd)	Harlan County War		Richard Taylor, Brian Thomas Nist, Scott Wolf, Trevor Jolly, Barbara Issak, Christopher B. Reeves, David Melhase, Cindy Rabideau, Ralph Osborn, Nancy Parker, Vince Nicastro	Showtime
2000 (52nd)	Introducing Dorothy Dandridge		David Hankins, Doug Kent, Bruce Tanis, Frank Smathers, Michael Babcock, Jeff Sawyer, David Beadle, Helen Luttrell, Sonya Henry, Larry Goeb, Kathy Durning, Chris McGeary, Dale W. Perry, Michael Broomberg	HBO
2001 (53rd)
2001 (53rd)	61*		Robert Grieve, Scott M. Silvey, Meg Taylor, Wayne Griffin, Kimberly Harris, Stephanie Lowry, Richard Partlow, Ellen Heuer	HBO
2001 (53rd)	Anne Frank: The Whole Story	"Part 2"	John Benson, Walter Michael Bost, Michael Babcock, Erik Aadahl, Andrew Ellerd, Jeff Sawyer, David Beadle, Sonya Henry, Helen Luttrell, Ralph Osborn III, Patrick Hogan, Gretchen Thoma, Timothy Pearson	ABC
2001 (53rd)	Conspiracy		Christopher Ackland, Gillian Dodders, Alan Paley, Felicity Cottrell, Jason Swanscott	HBO
2001 (53rd)	Frank Herbert's Dune	"Part 3"	Jay Wilkinson, Erik Aadahl, Bruce Tanis, Victor Iorillo, Andrew Ellerd, Bob Newlan, Ulrika Akander, David Grecu, Sonya Henry, David Beadle, Jeff Rosen, Larry Goeb, R.J. Palmer, Helen Luttrell, Patrick Hogan, Joshua Winget, Dale W. Perry	Sci Fi
2001 (53rd)	Nuremberg	"Part 2"	Paul Shikata, Richard Cadger, Ronayne Higginson, Donna Powell	TNT
2002 (54th)
2002 (54th)	Band of Brothers	"Day of Days"	Campbell Askew, Paul Conway, James Boyle, Ross Adams, Andy Kennedy, Howard Halsall, Robert Gavin, Grahame Peters, Michael Higham, Dashiell Rae, Andie Derrick, Peter Burgis	HBO
2002 (54th)	Anne Rice's The Feast of All Saints		Anthony Mazzei, David B. Cohn, Larry Mann, Jane Boegel, Barbara J. Boguski, Russell DeWolf, Tom Scurry, Erik Aadahl, Allan Bromberg, Todd Murakami, Eric Williams, Dale W. Perry	Showtime
2002 (54th)	The Lost Battalion		David C. Eichhorn, William C. Carruth, Michael Lyle, Rusty Tinsley, Mike Dickeson, Kevin Fisher, Tim Terusa, Rick Crampton, Joy Ealy, Richard S. Steele, Bob Costanza, Adriane Marfiak, Gary Macheel, Lou Thomas, Paul Menichini, Bruno Roussel, Tim Chilton, Jill Schachne	A&E
2002 (54th)	Shackleton	"Part 2"	Kevin Brazier, Philip Barnes, Blair Jollands, Wayne Brooks	A&E
2002 (54th)	Uprising	"Part 2"	G. Michael Graham, Devon Heffley Curry, Bill Bell, Mark Steele, Anton Holden, Mike Dickeson, Kevin Fisher, Troy Allen, Tim Terusa, Scott A. Tinsley, Randal S. Thomas, Bob Costanza, Adriane Marfiak, Gary Macheel, Lou Thomas, Bob Goold, Johnny Caruso, Tim Chilton, Jill Schachne	NBC
2003 (55th)
2003 (55th)	Hitler: The Rise of Evil	"Part 1"	Tom Bjelic, Paul Shikata, Rob Bertola, John Douglas Smith, Garrett Kerr, Tony Currie, Allan Fung, Craig Pettigrew, Donna Powell, Marina Adam	CBS
2003 (55th)	Frank Herbert's Children of Dune	"Part 1"	Erik Aadahl, Ulrika Akander, Jane Boegel, Tom Bognar, James J. Clinton, Russell DeWolf, Nathan Hankins, Michael Magill, Larry Mann, John Morris, Todd Murakami, Ralph Osborn, Mark Pappas, Chris Winter, Jay Wilkinson, Gary Krause, John T. Cucci, Dan O'Connell	Sci Fi
2003 (55th)	Live from Baghdad		Glenn T. Morgan, Ben Wilkins, Jon Title, Greg Hedgepath, Lisle Engle, Jon Mete, Daniel S. Irwin, Larry Kemp, Michelle Pazer, Scott Sanders, Frederick H. Stahly, Kelly Oxford, James Bladon, Diane Marshall, Michael Broomberg	HBO
2003 (55th)	Monte Walsh		Joe Melody, Devon Heffley Curry, Anton Holden, Randal S. Thomas, Rusty Tinsley, Rick Crampton, Charlie Kolander, Scott A. Tinsley, Patrick O'Sullivan, Bob Costanza, Mike Dickeson, Richard S. Steele, Gary Macheel, Kevin Fisher, Steven M. Sax, James Burt, Tim Chilton, Jill Schachne	TNT
2003 (55th)	Taken	"John"	David B. Cohn, Eileen Horta, Victor Iorillo, Andrew Ellerd, Benjamin Martin, Stuart Martin, Brian Thomas Nist, Robert Ramirez, David Beadle, Benjamin Beardwood, Larry Goeb, Patrick Hogan, Jason Lezama, Ralph Osborn III, Tom Scurry, Shannon Halwes, Dale W. Perry	Sci Fi
2004 (56th)
2004 (56th)	And Starring Pancho Villa as Himself		Geoffrey G. Rubay, Zack Davis, Tony Lamberti, David Williams, Karen Vassar Triest, Bruce Tanis, Carey Milbradt, Lou Kleinman, Allan K. Rosen, Nicholas Viterelli, Joshua Winget, Michael Lyle	HBO
2004 (56th)	Battlestar Galactica	"Part 2"	Jack Levy, Daniel Colman, Frank Nolan, Vince Balunas, Chris Boyett, Jeff K. Brunello, Jordan Corngold, Doug Madick, Michael Lyle	Sci Fi
2004 (56th)	Caesar	"Part 2"	Mark Friedgen, Suzanne Angel, Tim Terusa, Randal S. Thomas, Rick Crampton, Anton Holden, Rusty Tinsley, Charlie Kolander, Bob Costanza, Gary Macheel, Lou Thomas, Richard S. Steele, Adriane Marfiak, Mike Dickeson, Kevin Fisher, Dave Tinsley, Tim Chilton, Jill Schachne	TNT
2004 (56th)	44 Minutes: The North Hollywood Shoot-Out		Vince Gutierrez, Scott C. Kolden, Craig A. Dellinger, Michael P. Cook, Guy Tsujimoto, Ken Dufva	FX
2004 (56th)	Spartacus	"Part 2"	Mark Friedgen, Joy Ealy, Kathryn Madsen, Lou Thomas, Bill Bell, Tim Terusa, Anton Holden, William C. Carruth, Mark Steele, Mike Dickeson, Richard S. Steele, Adriane Marfiak, Gary Macheel, Bob Costanza, Kevin Fisher, James Bladon, Jill Schachne, Tim Chilton	USA
2005 (57th)
2005 (57th)	The Life and Death of Peter Sellers		Tim Hands, Geoffrey G. Rubay, James Mather, Victoria Brazier, Zack Davis, Laura Lovejoy, Anna MacKenzie, Richard Ford, Felicity Cottrell, Ruth Sullivan	HBO
2005 (57th)	The Grid	"Part 4"	Mark Friedgen, Devon Heffley Curry, Joy Ealy, Bob Costanza, Mike Dickeson, Gary Macheel, Mark Steele, Anton Holden, Charlie Kolander, Bill Bell, Kevin Fisher, Tom Trafalski, Tim Chilton, Jill Schachne	TNT
2005 (57th)	Hercules		Mark Friedgen, Joy Ealy, Mike Dickeson, Gary Macheel, Bob Costanza, Anton Holden, Allan K. Rosen, Tim Chilton, Jill Schachne	NBC
2005 (57th)	3: The Dale Earnhardt Story		Mark Friedgen, Joy Ealy, Anton Holden, Tim Terusa, Charlie Kolander, Mike Dickeson, Bob Costanza, Gary Macheel, Adriane Marfiak, Richard S. Steele, Bill Bell, Kathryn Madsen, Chris McGeary, Tim Chilton, Jill Schachne	ESPN
2005 (57th)	Warm Springs		Richard Taylor, David Beadle, Jane Boegel, Russell DeWolf, Andrew Ellerd, Juanita F. Diana, Sonya Henry, Patrick Hogan, Eileen Horta, Jason Lezama, Stuart Martin, Todd Murakami, Brian Thomas Nist, Robert Ramirez, Mark Cookson, Ed Kalnins, James Bailey, John Benson	HBO
2006 (58th)
2006 (58th)	Flight 93		Harry E. Snodgrass, Mark Linden, Tara A. Paul, David Scharf, Geoff Raffan, Carlos Ramirez, Joan Rowe, Chris Julian Irwin	A&E
2006 (58th)	Category 7: The End of the World	"Part 1"	Joe Melody, Devon Heffley Curry, Kevin Fisher, Richard S. Steele, Anton Holden, Joy Ealy, J. Michael Hooser, Burton Weinstein, Tim Terusa, Mark Steele, Sean Byrne, Bill Bell, Peter DiRado, Tim Chilton, Sharon Michaels	CBS
2006 (58th)	Into the West	"Manifest Destiny"	G. Michael Graham, Kristi Johns, Bill Bell, Bob Costanza, Mike Dickeson, Gary Macheel, Lou Thomas, Adriane Marfiak, Anton Holden, Burton Weinstein, Tim Terusa, Charlie Kolander, Rusty Tinsley, Jim Schultz, Jill Schachne, Tim Chilton	TNT
2006 (58th)	Sleeper Cell	"Youmud Din"	Mark Kamps, Todd Murakami, Jane Boegel, Jason Lezama, Patrick Hogan, Bob Newlan, Matt Fausak, Dale W. Perry	Showtime
2006 (58th)	Stephen King's Desperation		Richard Taylor, Todd Murakami, Jason Lezama, Andrew Ellerd, Bob Costanza, Brian Thomas Nist, Patrick Hogan, Mark Cookson, Mark Kamps, Robert Ramirez, Fred Judkins, Richard S. Steele, Sonya Henry, Stan Jones	ABC
2007 (59th)
2007 (59th)	Bury My Heart at Wounded Knee		Stephen Hunter Flick, Avram D. Gold, Steffan Falesitch, Eric Hertsguaard, Patricio A. Libenson, Denise Horta, Adam Johnston, Paul Berolzheimer, Dean Beville, Jeff Sawyer, Kenneth Young, Mike Flicker, David Lee Fein, Hilda Hodges	HBO
2007 (59th)	Broken Trail	"Part 2"	Kevin Howard, Rob Hegedus, Richard Calistan, Clive Turner, Jason MacNeill, Steve Copley, Carl Sealove, John Sievert, Virginia Storey	AMC
2007 (59th)	The Librarian: Return to King Solomon's Mines		Mark Friedgen, Joy Ealy, Kristi Johns, Burton Weinstein, Tim Terusa, Anton Holden, Bob Costanza, Richard S. Steele, Bill Bell, Jason Ruder, Tim Chilton, Jill Schachne	TNT
2007 (59th)	The Path to 9/11	"Part 1"	G. Michael Graham, J. Michael Hooser, Bob Costanza, Bill Bell, Mike Dickeson, Kevin Fisher, Anton Holden, Adriane Marfiak, Mark Steele, Joy Ealy, Devon Heffley Curry, Daniel J. Johnson, Tim Chilton, Jill Schachne	ABC
2007 (59th)	Tsunami: The Aftermath	"Part 1"	Julian Slater, Paul Conway, Simon Price, Tony Currie, Peter Gates, Steve Browell, Ben Norrington, Stephen Griffiths, John Warhurst, John Fewell, Julie Ankerson	HBO
2008 (60th)
2008 (60th)	John Adams	"Don't Tread on Me"	Stephen Hunter Flick, Vanessa Lapato, Kira Roessler, Curt Schulkey, Randy Kelley, Kenneth L. Johnson, Paul Berolzheimer, Dean Beville, Bryan Bowen, Patricio A. Libenson, Solange S. Schwalbe, David Lee Fein, Hilda Hodges, Alex Gibson	HBO
2008 (60th)	The Andromeda Strain	"Part 2"	G. Michael Graham, Devon Heffley Curry, Anton Holden, Tim Terusa, Daniel Tripoli, Mike Dickeson, Bob Costanza, Kevin Fisher, Richard S. Steele, Bill Bell, Erich Gann, Tim Chilton, Sharon Michaels, Bunny Andrews	A&E
2008 (60th)	Comanche Moon	"Part 2"	Joe Melody, Richard S. Steele, Suzanne Angel, Mike Dickeson, Penny Harold, Adriane Marfiak, Bill Bell, Kevin Fisher, J. Michael Hooser, Tim Chilton, Sharon Michaels, Chris McGeary	CBS
2008 (60th)	John Adams	"Unnecessary War"	Jon Johnson, Bryan Bowen, Kira Roessler, Vanessa Lapato, Eileen Horta, Virginia Cook-McGowan, Samuel C. Crutcher, Mark Messick, Martin Maryska, Greg Stacy, Patricio A. Libenson, Solange S. Schwalbe, David Lee Fein, Hilda Hodges, Nicholas Viterelli	HBO
2008 (60th)	Tin Man	"Part 1"	Anke Bakker, Brian Campbell, Kris Fenske, James Fonnyadt, Devan Kraushar, Steve Smith, Matthew Wilson, Ken Cade, Jay Cheetham, Cam Wagner, Shane Shemko, Rich Walters	Sci Fi
2009 (61st)
2009 (61st)	Generation Kill	"The Cradle of Civilization"	Stefan Henrix, Graham Headicar, Jack Whittaker, Lee Walpole, Becki Ponting, Jen Ralston, Iain Eyre, Andre Schmidt, Virginia Thorn, Andy Kennedy, Peter Burgis, Andie Derrick	HBO
2009 (61st)	The Courageous Heart of Irena Sendler		Stephen Grubbs, Suzanne Angel, Joy Ealy, Bob Costanza, Richard S. Steele, Erich Gann, Robert Webber, Christopher Kennedy, Tim Chilton, Sharon Michaels	CBS
2009 (61st)	Into the Storm		Mark Auguste, Sam Auguste, Glen Gathard, Graham Sutton, Peter Burgis, Andie Derrick	HBO
2009 (61st)	The Librarian: Curse of the Judas Chalice		Robert Webber, Noah Blough, Christopher Winter, Bob Costanza, Mike Dickeson, Penny Harold, Andrew Garrett Lange, Jason Ruder, Christopher Moriana, Catherine Harper	TNT
2009 (61st)	Taking Chance		Frank Gaeta, Rickley W. Dumm, David Grant, Tim Boggs, Johnny Caruso, Catherine Harper, Christopher Moriana	HBO
2009 (61st)	24: Redemption		William Dotson, Cathie Speakman, Jeffrey R. Whitcher, Pembrooke Andrews, Shawn Kennelly, Daryl Fontenault, Melissa Kennelly, Jeff Charbonneau, Laura Macias, Vince Nicastro	Fox

=== 2010s ===
Year	Program	Episode	Nominees	Network
2010 (62nd)
2010 (62nd)	The Pacific	"Part Five"	Tom Bellfort, Benjamin L. Cook, Daniel S. Irwin, Hector C. Gika, Charles Maynes, Paul Aulicino, John C. Stuver, David Williams, Michelle Pazer, John Finklea, Jody Thomas, Katherine Rose	HBO
2010 (62nd)	Alice	"Part 1"	Kirby Jinnah, Melody Drolet, James Wallace, Brian Campbell, Jay Cheetham, Dario DiSanto, Kris Fenske, Rich Walters, Shane Shemko, Cam Wagner	Syfy
2010 (62nd)	Moonshot		Peter Baldock, Michael Feinberg, Adele Fletcher, Simon Gershon, Richard Todman, Julie Ankerson	History
2010 (62nd)	Temple Grandin		Bryan Bowen, Vanessa Lapato, Paul Curtis, Petra Bach, Bruce Tanis, Ellen Segal, David Lee Fein, Hilda Hodges	HBO
2011 (63rd)
2011 (63rd)	The Pillars of the Earth	"The Work of Angels"	Marcel Pothier, Tom Trafalski, Christian Rivest, Dominik Pagacz, Guy Pelletier, Antoine Morin, Guy Francoeur	Starz
2011 (63rd)	Any Human Heart	"Part 2"	Adam Armitage, Robin Whittaker, Keith Partridge, Laura Lovejoy, Alex Sawyer	PBS
2011 (63rd)	Downton Abbey	"Part 1"	Adam Armitage, Alex Sawyer	PBS
2011 (63rd)	Mildred Pierce	"Part Five"	Eliza Paley, Tony Martinez, Thomas O'Neil Younkman, Brian Dunlop, Todd Kasow, Ellen Heuer	HBO
2012 (64th)
2012 (64th)	Hemingway & Gellhorn		Douglas Murray, Pete Horner, Kim Foscato, Steve Boeddeker, Casey Langfelder, Andrea Gard, Pat Jackson, Daniel Laurie, Goro Koyama, Andy Malcolm, Joanie Diener	HBO
2012 (64th)	American Horror Story	"Piggy Piggy"	Gary Megregian, David Klotz, Steven Stuhr, Jason Krane, Jason Lezama, Timothy A. Cleveland, Bruce Tanis, Simon Coke, Zane D. Bruce, Jeff Gunn, Lance Wiseman	FX
2012 (64th)	Hatfields & McCoys	"Part 1"	Tom Bjelic, John Laing, John Douglas Smith, Mark Dejczak, Michael Mancuso, Dermain Finlayson, Kevin Banks, Darrell Hall, Alex Bullick, Nathan Robitaille, Dan Kiener, Emilie Boucek, Steve Baine	History
2012 (64th)	The River	"Doctor Emmet Cole"	Paula Fairfield, Jill Purdy, Carla Murray, Shelley Roden, Gregg Barbanell	ABC
2012 (64th)	Sherlock: A Scandal in Belgravia		Jeremy Child, Doug Sinclair	PBS
2013 (65th)
2013 (65th)	American Horror Story: Asylum	"Welcome to Briarcliff"	Gary Megregian, Christian Buenaventura, Jason Krane, Steven Stuhr, Timothy A. Cleveland, David Klotz, Andrew Spencer Dawson, Noel Vought	FX
2013 (65th)	Battlestar Galactica: Blood & Chrome		Daniel Colman, Jack Levy, Sam C. Lewis, Vince Balunas, Greg Stacy, Sara Bencivenga, Michael Baber, Doug Madick, Richard Partlow	Syfy
2013 (65th)	The Bible	"Beginnings"	Jamie Caple, Matt Davies, Robert Brazier, Stefano Marchetti, Marc Lawes, Jeremy Price, Simon Gershon, Rodney Berling, Jason Swanscott, Claire Mahoney	History
2013 (65th)	Seal Team Six: The Raid on Osama Bin Laden		Trip Brock, Jackie Johnson, Ian Shedd, Brian S.M. Wroth, Peter D. Lago, Steven Avila, Alexander Pugh, Ben Whitver, Christopher Kaller, Kate Sheil, Greg Mauer, Rick Owens	Nat Geo
2013 (65th)	World Without End	"Medieval Life and Death"	Jane Tattersall, David McCallum, Dale Sheldrake, Mitch Bederman, Steve Hammond	Reelz
2014 (66th)
2014 (66th)	Sherlock: His Last Vow		Doug Sinclair, Stuart McCowan, Jon Joyce, Paul McFadden, Will Everett, Sue Harding	PBS
2014 (66th)	American Horror Story: Coven	"Fearful Pranks Ensue"	Gary Megregian, David Klotz, Timothy A. Cleveland, Paul J. Diller, Brian Thomas Nist, Steven Stuhr, Lance Wiseman, Noel Vought	FX
2014 (66th)	Bonnie & Clyde	"Part 2"	Robert L. Sephton, Pembrooke Andrews, Joanie Diener, Chato Hill, Robert Guastini, Mike Pipgras, Anita Cannella, Amy Kane	Lifetime
2014 (66th)	Fargo	"The Crocodile's Dilemma"	Frank Laratta, Kevin W. Buchholz, John Peccatiello, Skye Lewin, Jason Lawrence, Brent Planiden, Andrew Morgado, Adam De Coster	FX
2014 (66th)	Klondike	"Part 1"	Lee Walpole, Frank Laratta, Iain Eyre, Andy Kennedy, Jason Lawrence, Catherine Thomas, Juraj Mravec, Sue Harding	Discovery
2014 (66th)	Mob City	"Oxpecker" / "Stay Down"	Matthew E. Taylor, Rickley W. Dumm, Jason King, Tim Farrell	TNT
2015 (67th)
2015 (67th)	Houdini	"Part 1"	Michael J. Benavente, David Beadle, Timothy A. Cleveland, Rachel Corrales, Paul J. Diller, Gary Megregian, Ryan Maguire, Michael Sana, John Snider, Robert Ulrich, Lance Wiseman, Jim Harrison, Joan Rowe	History
2015 (67th)	American Crime	"Episode One"	Walter Newman, Kenneth Young, Darleen Stoker, Bruce Tanis, Peter Reynolds, Louie Schultz, Catherine Harper, Gregg Barbanell	ABC
2015 (67th)	American Horror Story: Freak Show	"Curtain Call"	Gary Megregian, Timothy A. Cleveland, Paul J. Diller, Steven Stuhr, Lance Wiseman, Jason Krane, John Green, David Klotz, Noel Vought	FX
2015 (67th)	Texas Rising	"Part 4"	John Laing, Tom Bjelic, Alex Bullick, Tyler Whitham, Michael Mancuso, Adam Stein, Petra Bach, Jill Purdy, Mark Dejczak, Mark Gingras, Dermain Finlayson, Dale Lennon, Kevin Banks, Jim Harrison, Steve Baine, Simon Meilleur	History
2015 (67th)	24: Live Another Day	"7:00 p.m. – 8:00 p.m."	Pembrooke Andrews, Jeffrey R. Whitcher, Robert Guastini, Jeff Charbonneau, Shawn Kennelly, Melissa Kennelly, Vince Nicastro	Fox
2016 (68th)
2016 (68th)	Fargo	"The Castle"	Nick Forshager, Joe Bracciale, Robert Bertola, Paul Shikata, Mark Bensi, John Elliot	FX
2016 (68th)	American Horror Story: Hotel	"Checking In"	Gary Megregian, Steven M. Stuhr, Jason Krane, Timothy A. Cleveland, Paul J. Diller, David Klotz, Noel Vought, Ginger Geary	FX
2016 (68th)	The Night Manager	"Part 5"	Adam Armitage, Howard Bargroff, Alex Sawyer, Peter Melemendjian, Barnaby Smith	AMC
2016 (68th)	Roots	"Part 2"	Gary Megregian, Stuart Martin, Andrew Dawson, Steve M. Stuhr, Jason Krane, Christian Buenaventura, Timothy A. Cleveland, Paul Diller, John Snider, Marcello Dubaz, Michael Sana, Daniel Salas, Matt Shelton, Noel Vought, Ginger Geary	History
2016 (68th)	Sherlock: The Abominable Bride		Douglas Sinclair, Paul McFadden, Jonathan Joyce, Stuart McCowan, Howard Bargroff, Rael Jones, Jamie Talbut, Julie Ankerson	PBS
2017 (69th)
2017 (69th)	The Night Of	"Subtle Beast"	Nicholas Renbeck, Marissa Littlefield, Steve Visscher, Ruth Hernandez, Sara Stern, Luciano Vignola, Odin Benitez, Ruy Garcia, Wyatt Sprague, Warren Shaw, Roland Vajs, Heather Gross, Dan Evans Farkas, Grant Conway, Marko Costanzo	HBO
2017 (69th)	American Horror Story: Roanoke	"Chapter 1"	Gary Megregian, Steve M. Stuhr, Jason Krane, Timothy A. Cleveland, Paul Diller, David Klotz, Noel Vought	FX
2017 (69th)	Fargo	"Who Rules the Land of Denial?"	Nick Forshager, Joe Bracciale, Martin Gwynn Jones, Brent Pickett, Claire Dobson, Robert Bertola, Alex Bullick, Tyler Whitham, Matt Decker, John Elliot	FX
2017 (69th)	Genius	"Einstein: Chapter One"	Daniel Pagan, Erich Gann, Arielle McGrail, Bill Bell, Nicholas Fitzgerald, Tim Chilton, Jill Sanders	Nat Geo
2017 (69th)	Sherlock: The Lying Detective		Douglas Sinclair, Jon Salmon-Joyce, Stuart McCowan, Paul McFadden, Howard Bargroff, Nathan Palmer, Jamie Talbutt, Rael Jones, Sue Harding	PBS
2018 (70th)
2018 (70th)	USS Callister (Black Mirror)		Kenny Clark, Michael Maroussas, Dario Swade, Ricky Butt, Oliver Ferris	Netflix
2018 (70th)	American Horror Story: Cult	"Great Again"	Gary Megregian, Naaman Haynes, Steve M. Stuhr, Timothy A. Cleveland, Paul Diller, Mitchell Lestner, Sam Munoz, David Klotz, Noel Vought	FX
2018 (70th)	Fahrenheit 451		Nick Forshager, Joe Bracciale, Martin Gwynn Jones, Brent Pickett, Claire Dobson, Robert Bertola, Alex Bullick, Tyler Whitham, Matt Decker, John Elliot	HBO
2018 (70th)	Godless	"Homecoming"	Wylie Stateman, Eric Hoehn, Harry Cohen, Gregg Swiatlowski, Hector C. Gika, Leo Marcil, Sylvain Lasseur, Jackie Zhou, Tom Kramer	Netflix
2018 (70th)	Twin Peaks	"Part 8"	Ron Eng, Dean Hurley, David Lynch, David A. Cohen, Kerry Dean Williams, Luke Gibleon, Willard Overstreet	Showtime
2018 (70th)	Waco	"Operation Showtime"	Kelly Oxford, Karen Triest, Mitch Bederman, Brian Straub	Paramount
2019 (71st)
2019 (71st)	Chernobyl	"1:23:45"	Stefan Henrix, Joe Beal, Michael Maroussas, Harry Barnes, Andy Wade, Anna Wright	HBO
2019 (71st)	Catch-22	"Episode 1"	Jerry Ross, Doug Mountain, Byron Wilson, Chris Assells, Jeff Fuller, Michael Alexander, Clayton Weber, Catherine Harper, Catherine Rose	Hulu
2019 (71st)	Deadwood: The Movie		Mandell Winter, Daniel Colman, Ben Cook, Bernard Weiser, Brian Armstrong, Shane Hayes, Rob Chen, Dhyanna Carlton-Tim, Micha Liberman, Eryne Prine, John Sievert, Stefan Fraticelli, Jason Charbonneau	HBO
2019 (71st)	True Detective	"The Great War and Modern Memory"	Mandell Winter, David Esparza, Micah Loken, Bernard Weiser, Ryan Collins, Fernand Bos, Jason Wormer, Eryne Prine, Sarah Monat, Robin Harlan	HBO
2019 (71st)	When They See Us	"Part 4"	John Benson, Susan Dudeck, Bruce Tanis, Chase Keene, Jesse Pomeroy, Naaman Haynes, Bobbi Banks, Elliott Koretz, Matt Wilson, Suat Ayas, Jen Monnar, Dawn Lunsford, Alicia Stevenson	Netflix

=== 2020s ===
Year	Program	Episode	Nominees	Network
2020 (72nd)
2020 (72nd)	Watchmen	"This Extraordinary Being"	Brad North, Harry Cohen, Jordan Wilby, Tiffany S. Griffith, Antony Zeller, A.J. Shapiro, Sally Boldt, Zane Bruce, Lindsay Pepper	HBO
2020 (72nd)	American Horror Story: 1984	"Camp Redwood"	Gary Megregian, Timothy A. Cleveland, Naaman Haynes, Patrick Hogan, Sam Munoz, David Klotz, Noel Vought	FX
2020 (72nd)	Catherine the Great	"Episode 4"	Jim Goddard, Craig Butters, Duncan Price, Matthew Mewett, Andrew Glen, Anna Wright, Catherine Thomas	HBO
2020 (72nd)	Devs	"Episode 3"	Glenn Freemantle, Ben Barker, Gillian Dodders, James Wichall, Danny Freemantle, Robert Malone, Dayo James, Nicholas Freemantle, Lily Blazewicz, Emilie O'Connor	FX
2020 (72nd)	El Camino: A Breaking Bad Movie		Nick Forshager, Todd Toon, Kathryn Madsen, Jane Boegel, Luke Gibleon, Jason Tregoe Newman, Bryant J. Fuhrmann, Jeff Cranford, Gregg Barbanell, Alex Ullrich	Netflix
2021 (73rd)
2021 (73rd)	The Queen's Gambit	"End Game"	Gregg Swiatlowski, Eric Hirsch, Wylie Stateman, Leo Marcil, Mary Ellen Porto, Patrick Cicero, James David Redding III, Eric Hoehn, Tom Kramer, Rachel Chancey	Netflix
2021 (73rd)	Fargo	"East/West"	Nick Forshager, Tim Boggs, Todd Niesen, Matt Temple, Adam Parrish King, Brad Bakelmun, Ben Schor, Stef Fraticelli, Jason Charbonneau	FX
2021 (73rd)	The Haunting of Bly Manor	"The Two Faces, Part 2"	Trevor Gates, Jason Dotts, Kristen Hirlinger, Paul B. Knox, Piero Mura, James Miller, Matthew Thomas Hall, Mark Coffey, Ryan Meadows, Amy Barber, Julia Huberman, Brett "Snacky" Pierce, Jonathan Bruce, Ben Parker	Netflix
2021 (73rd)	The Underground Railroad	"Chapter 9: Indiana Winter"	Onnalee Blank, Chris Kahwaty, Katy Wood, Bryan Parker, Jason W. Jennings, Harry Cohen, Luke Gibleon, Pietu Korhonen, Lars Halvorsen, John Finklea, Heikki Kossi	Prime Video
2021 (73rd)	WandaVision	"The Series Finale"	Gwendolyn Yates Whittle, Kim Foscato, James Spencer, Chris Gridley, Steve Orlando, Scott Guitteau, Jon Borland, Samson Neslund, Richard Gould, Jordan Myers, Luke Dunn Gielmuda, Greg Peterson, Fernand Bos, Anele Onyekwere, Ronni Brown, Shelley Roden	Disney+
2022 (74th)
2022 (74th)	Moon Knight	"Gods and Monsters"	Bonnie Wild, Mac Smith, Kimberly Patrick, Vanessa Lapato, Matt Hartman, Teresa Eckton, Tim Farrell, Leo Marcil, Joel Raabe, Ian Chase, Anele Onyekwere, Stephanie Lowry, Carl Sealove, Dan O'Connell, John Cucci	Disney+
2022 (74th)	American Horror Story: Double Feature	"Gaslight"	Christian Buenaventura, Steve M. Stuhr, David Beadle, Tim Cleveland, Zheng Jia, Samuel Muñoz, Sean McGuire, Noel Vought	FX
2022 (74th)	Gaslit	"Year of the Rat"	Kevin Buchholz, Stefani Feldman, Sang Kim, Dan Kremer, Adam Parrish King, Sam Munoz, Jordan Aldinger, Ben Zales, Chris Rummel, Jacob McNaughton, Noel Vought	Starz
2022 (74th)	Midnight Mass	"Book VII: Revelation"	Trevor Gates, Jonathan Wales, Kristen Hirlinger, Jason Dotts, Michael Baird, Paul Knox, Russell Topal, James Miller, Matthew Thomas Hall, Mark Coffey, Amy Barber, Julia Huberman, Brett "Snacky" Pierce, Ben Parker, Jonathan Bruce	Netflix
2022 (74th)	Station Eleven	"Wheel of Fire"	Bradley North, Tiffany S. Griffith, Chuck Michael, Matt Manselle, Matt Kelsey, Lodge Worster, Brian Straub	HBO Max
2023 (75th)
2023 (75th)	Prey		Chris Terhune, William Files, Jessie Anne Spence, James Miller, Diego Perez, Lee Gilmore, Christopher Bonis, Daniel DiPrima, Stephen Perone, Leslie Bloome, Shaun Brennan	Hulu
2023 (75th)	Dahmer – Monster: The Jeffrey Dahmer Story	"God of Forgiveness, God of Vengeance"	Gary Megregian, Borja Sau, Bruce Tanis, David Klotz, Sam Munoz, Noel Vought	Netflix
2023 (75th)	Guillermo del Toro's Cabinet of Curiosities	"The Autopsy"	Nelson Ferreira, Jill Purdy, Paul Davies, Bernard O'Reilly, Paul Germann, Tom Jenkins, Robert Hegedus, Goro Koyama	Netflix
2023 (75th)	Mrs. Davis	"Mother of Mercy: The Call of the Horse"	Bryan Parker, Kristen Hirlinger, Nathan Efstation, Roland Thai, Matt Decker, Sam Lewis, Sam Munoz, Ellen Heuer, Nancy Parker	Peacock
2023 (75th)	Obi-Wan Kenobi	"Part VI"	Matthew Wood, Trey Turner, Angela Ang, Ryan Cota, Jon Borland, Tim Farrell, Michael Levine, Ramiro Belgardt, Nicholas Fitzgerald, Thom Brennan, Ronni Brown, Sean England	Disney+
2024 (76th)
2024 (76th)	Ripley	"III Sommerso"	Larry Zipf, Michael Feuser, Michael McMenomy, Lidia Tamplenizza, David Forshee, Bill R. Dean, Wyatt Sprague, Angelo Palazzo, Matt Haasch, Igor Nikolic, Dan Evans Farkas, Ben Schor, Jay Peck, Sandra Fox	Netflix
2024 (76th)	All the Light We Cannot See	"Episode 4"	Craig Henighan, Ryan Cole, Emma Present, Jill Purdy, David Grimaldi, Matt Cloud, Gina Wark, Dan DiPrima, Steve Durkee, Steve Baine	Netflix
2024 (76th)	Fargo	"The Tragedy of the Commons"	Nick Forshager, Tyler Whitham, Joe Bracciale, Dustin Harris, Alex Bullick, Brad Bakelmun, Ben Schor, Jason Charbonneau, Stefan Fraticelli	FX
2024 (76th)	Masters of the Air	"Part Five"	Jack Whittaker, Michael Minkler, Jeff Sawyer, Luke Gibleon, Dave McMoyler, Michael Hertlein, Michele Perrone, Jim Brookshire, Bryan Parker, Zach Goheen, Paul B. Knox, Adam Kopald, Angela Claverie, Dylan Wilhoit, Jeff Wilhoit	Apple TV+
2024 (76th)	True Detective: Night Country	"Part 6"	Martin Hernández, Stephen Griffiths, Tom Jenkins, Michele Woods, Andy Shelley, Jake Fielding, Stuart Bagshaw, Barnaby Smyth, Rebecca Glover, Ben Smithers	HBO
2025 (77th)
2025 (77th)	The Penguin	"After Hours"	Rich Bologna, Larry Zipf, Michael McMenomy, Angela Organ, Tony Martinez, Wyatt Sprague, Diego Perez, Matt Haasch, Ben Holiday, Luke Dennis, Gareth Rhys Jones	HBO
2025 (77th)	Adolescence	"Episode 1"	James Drake, Michele Woods, Emma Butt, Rob Davidson, Jessica Watkins, Oli Ferris, Sue Harding	Netflix
2025 (77th)	Black Mirror	"USS Callister: Into Infinity"	Tom Jenkins, Alex Sawyer, James Hayday, Rob Davidson, Arthur Graley, Poppy Kavanagh, Oliver Ferris, Sue Harding	Netflix
2025 (77th)	The Gorge		Ethan Van der Ryn, Erik Aadahl, Paul Hackner, Darren Maynard, David Farmer, Frederic Dubois, David V. Butler, Stephanie Brown, Jonathan Greasley, Jason W. Jennings, Nolan McNaughton, Sally Boldt	Apple TV+
2025 (77th)	Star Trek: Section 31		Matthew E. Taylor, Michael Schapiro, Austin Olivia Kendrick, Sebastian Sheehan Visconti, Sean Heissinger, Andrew Twite, Alex Pugh, Kip Smedley, Deron Street, Clay Weber, Moira Marquis, Alyson Moore, Katie Rose	Paramount+
2026 (78th)
2026 (78th)	Beef	"It Will Stay This Way and You Will Obey"	Christopher Gomez, Danika Wikke, Jerry Lafuente, Yurii Kerelius, Luke Dennis, Danylo Gomlez	Netflix
2026 (78th)	The Beast in Me	"Sick Puppy"	Ruy Garcia, Marcello Dubaz, Marissa Littlefield, Isaac Derfel, Otis Streeter, Jo Caron, James Sizemore, Guy Francoeur	Netflix
2026 (78th)	Lord of the Flies	"Piggy"	Niv Adiri, Tom Sayers, Linda Forsén, Phil Freudenfeld, Kirsty Graham, Paolo Pavesi, Zoe Freed, Rebecca Heathcote	Netflix
2026 (78th)	The Rip		Daniel Pagan, Craig Mann, Chase Keehn, Jon Title, Russell Topal, Randy Wilson, Justin Helle, Sam Zeines, Stefan Fraticelli, Jason Charbonneau	Netflix
2026 (78th)	Tom Clancy's Jack Ryan: Ghost War		Lewis Goldstein, Alfred DeGrand, Tyler Newhouse, Rebeca Lindenfeld, Bennett Kerr, Marcello Dubaz, Patrick Cicero, Henry Butler, Paul Urmson, Wen-Hsuan Tseng, Annie Taylor, Nicholas Kmet, Leslie Bloome	Prime Video

== Programs with multiple nominations ==
9 nominations

- American Horror Story

5 nominations

- Fargo

4 nominations

- Sherlock

2 nominations

- Black Mirror
- John Adams
- True Detective
