= Meet McGraw =

American TV detective drama (1957–1959)

- Written by: E. Jack Neuman
- Directed by: John Peyser
- Starring: Frank Lovejoy
- Theme music composer: Harold Arlen; Johnny Mercer
- Opening theme: "One for My Baby"
- Country of origin: United States
- No. of episodes: 33

Production
- Producers: Don Sharpe; Warren Lewis

Original release
- Network: NBC
- Release: July 2, 1957 – June 24, 1958

Meet McGraw is an American television detective drama that was broadcast on NBC from July 2, 1957, to June 24, 1958. Several months after it debuted, the title was changed to Adventures of McGraw. It was also shown in Canada on CBC Television and some independent stations. ABC began showing reruns of the program in the United States in November 1958. They ended on October 8, 1959.

== Background ==
Producer Don Sharpe said that the idea for the McGraw character came to him in 1954 while he was working in England, and it had no basis in any existing literary figure. Four Star Playhouse broadcast "Meet McGraw" as an episode on February 25, 1954. In that episode, McGraw was "a hood with a price on his head" who helped people who for some reason could not go to the police. Stage 7 also had an episode featuring McGraw in March 1955.

== Premise ==
The only main regular character was McGraw (played by Frank Lovejoy), who had no first name. He began each episode with the statement, "This is McGraw, just McGraw. It's enough of a name for a man like McGraw."

McGraw was a loner, a tough man who did not carry a gun. He was "not officially a private detective", but "he accepted all sorts of dangerous jobs for pay." Lovejoy said that he felt "quite strongly that a leading character in a present-day TV series who gets involved regularly in dangerous situations should solve them maturely, ethically and realistically." Thus, when McGraw was confronted by someone holding a gun, he was likely to leap for safety rather than trying to take the weapon away.

McGraw's loner nature meant that no matter how he might become involved with anyone during an episode, "at the end of each episode he moved on."

== Episodes ==
Selected episodes of Meet McGraw
Date	Title
July 2, 1957	"The New Orleans Story"
April 22, 1958	"Rare Perfume" (Alternate title: "The Disappearance"

== Schedule ==
The July debut of Meet McGraw was unusual, as new TV series customarily began in September or October. The trade publication Variety called the move a "calculated gamble". Sponsor Procter & Gamble felt that the advance start would allow the show to accumulate an audience before competing shows began their seasons. Variety noted that because of Procter & Gamble's "traditional bellwether role in the industry as an innovator in new radio-TV time-buying techniques" the experiment would "be watched with considerable interest by the networks and agencies."

The NBC broadcasts were from 9 to 9:30 p.m. Eastern Time on Tuesdays. Reruns on ABC were initially from 10 to 10:30 p.m. ET on Sundays. In January 1959 they were from 9:30 to 10 p.m. ET on Sundays. February - September 1959 episodes were shown from 10:30 to 11 p.m. ET on Sundays, and the October 1959 episodes were from 9 to 9:30 p.m. ET on Thursdays.

== Production ==
Warren Lewis and Sharpe were the producers. John Peyser was the director, and E. Jack Neuman was the writer. Harold Arlen and Johnny Mercer wrote the program's theme, "One for My Baby". Thirty-three episodes were made in black-and-white, filmed at Desilu studios in Hollywood.

When Procter & Gamble decided to eliminate its Tuesday night programs, that ended the original run of the series even though "ratings were good". ABC bought the films to show as reruns.

== Critical response ==
A review in The New York Times described Lovejoy as "a competent actor" and added "He deserves much better than Meet McGraw."

A newspaper article distributed by NEA noted that the program appealed to both men and women viewers, but for different reasons: "Male fans envy his lack of responsibilities, and he's fascinating to women who are probably thinking they'd like to corral him into more permanent surroundings."

Arthur Grace wrote in The Miami News, "Meet McGraw was weak in story lines but still a rewarding series thanks to Lovejoy's acting abilities and good dialogue."

A Variety review of the first episode described it as "formula stuff". It added that the story wasted the talents of the actors and the director.
