= Jon Johnson =

American sound editor

- Born: October 16, 1954 (age 71); Sheridan, Wyoming, U.S.
- Occupation: Sound editor
- Years active: 1982–present

Jon Johnson, MPSE (born October 16, 1954) is an American sound editor of television and feature film. He won the Academy Award for Best Sound Editing for his work on the World War II submarine epic U-571 (2000).

== Career ==
Johnson has been a leading figure in sound editing for many years. His career began with work as a sound effects editor on animated programs such as The New Scooby and Scrappy-Doo Show and Super Friends: The Legendary Super Powers Show, among others. His foray into feature film came with the horror film documentary Terror in the Aisles (1984). Another milestone, his first supervising sound editor role, came two years later on the Return to Mayberry (1986) reunion special.

Johnson's work in mainstream cinema took off with the popular science fiction films Star Trek Generations (1994) and Independence Day (1996). With the success of those projects, he went on to become a highly regard supervising sound editor in Hollywood. His credits include U-571 (2000), A Knight's Tale (2001), Amazing Grace (2006), The Blind Side (2009), Captain America: The First Avenger (2011) and Saving Mr. Banks (2013). He has not, however, forgotten his roots in television, having served as supervising sound editor on the miniseries John Adams (2008) and the television film Grey Gardens (2009).

== Awards ==
Year	Award	Category	Work	Result
1986	Emmy Awards	Outstanding Sound Editing for a Miniseries, Movie or a Special	Unnatural Causes	Won
1986	Emmy Awards	Outstanding Sound Editing for a Miniseries, Movie or a Special	Fresno (for Part VI)	Nominated
1989	Emmy Awards	Outstanding Sound Editing for a Series	MacGyver (for episode "Gold Rush")	Nominated
2000	Academy Awards	Best Sound Editing	U-571	Won
2008	Emmy Awards	Outstanding Sound Editing for a Miniseries, Movie or a Special	John Adams (for episode "Unnecessary War")	Nominated
