= Luke Gibleon =

American sound editor

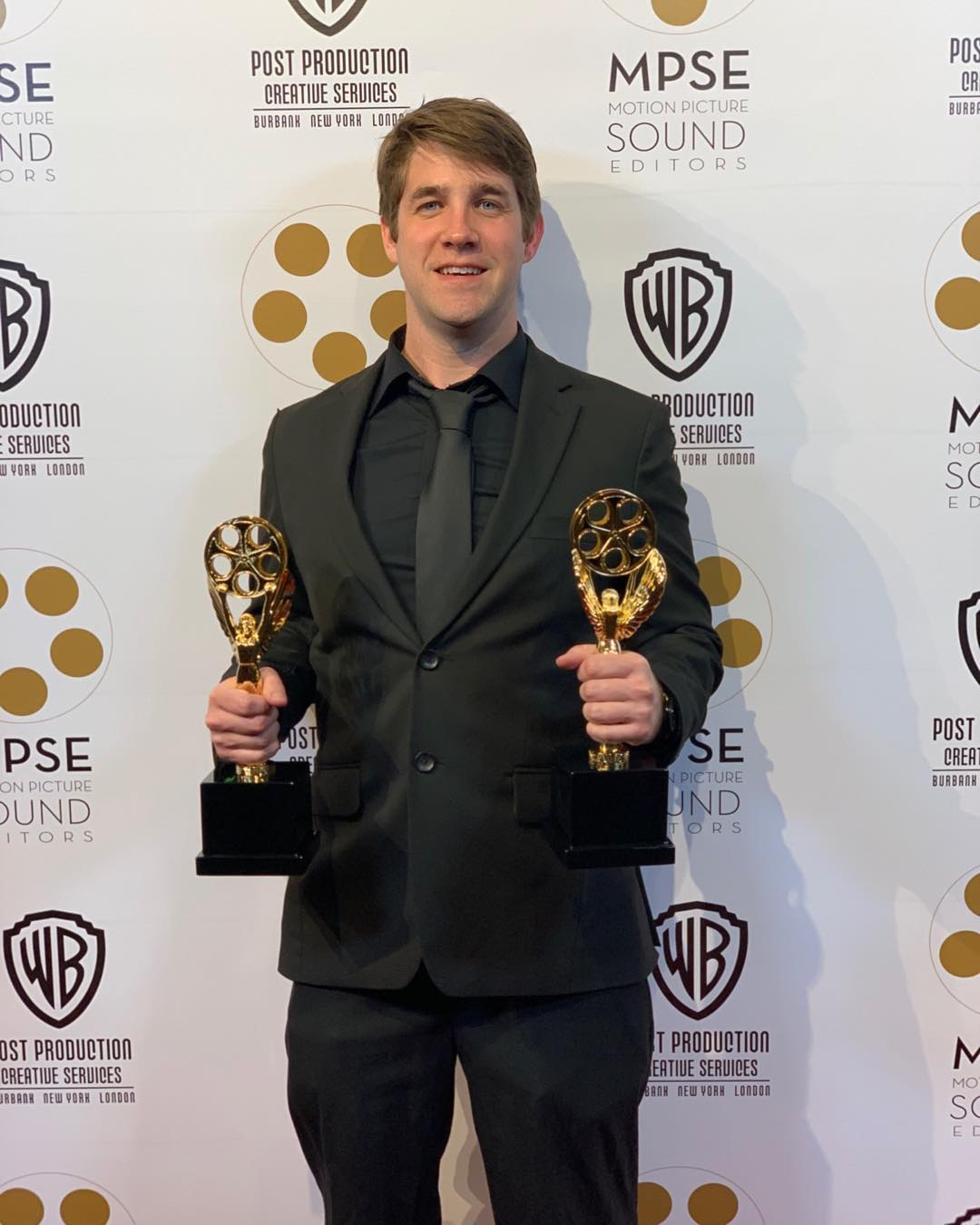
- Born: Waterloo, Iowa, U.S.
- Occupations: Sound editor, re-recording mixer, sound designer
- Years active: 2008–present

Luke Gibleon is an American sound editor and re-recording mixer. He has won four Motion Picture Sound Editors Awards.

== Early life ==
Luke was born in Waterloo, Iowa. He graduated with a BM from the Berklee College of Music in 2007.

== Selected filmography ==
- 2024 – Mufasa: The Lion King
- 2024 – Avatar: The Last Airbender
- 2024 – The Fall Guy
- 2024 – Masters of the Air
- 2023 – The Continental
- 2023 – John Wick: Chapter 4
- 2022 – Bullet Train
- 2022 – The Bob's Burgers Movie
- 2021 – The Underground Railroad
- 2021 – Chaos Walking
- 2020 – Greyhound
- 2020 – Birds of Prey
- 2019 – El Camino: A Breaking Bad Movie
- 2019 – Togo
- 2019 – John Wick: Chapter 3 – Parabellum
- 2019 – Hobbs & Shaw
- 2017 – Twin Peaks

== Awards and nominations ==
Year	Result	Award	Category	Work	Ref.
2024	Nominated	Primetime Emmy Awards	Outstanding Sound Editing for a Limited or Anthology Series, Movie or Special	Masters of the Air	
2024	Nominated	Primetime Emmy Awards	Outstanding Sound Editing for a Comedy or Drama Series (One-Hour)	Avatar: The Last Airbender	
2024	Nominated	Motion Picture Sound Editors	Outstanding Achievement in Sound Editing - Feature Effects and Foley	John Wick: Chapter 4	
2024	Nominated	Motion Picture Sound Editors	Outstanding Achievement in Sound Editing – Broadcast Long Form Effects / Foley	The Continental	
2024	Won	Music+Sound Awards	Best Sound Design In A Television Series Or Programme	The Continental	
2022	Won	Motion Picture Sound Editors	Outstanding Achievement in Sound Editing - Limited Series or Anthology	The Underground Railroad	
2021	Won	Motion Picture Sound Editors	Outstanding Achievement in Sound Editing - Feature Effects and Foley	Greyhound	
2021	Nominated	Primetime Emmy Awards	Outstanding Sound Editing for a Limited or Anthology Series, Movie or Special	The Underground Railroad	
2020	Nominated	Primetime Emmy Awards	Outstanding Sound Editing for a Limited or Anthology Series, Movie or Special	El Camino: A Breaking Bad Movie	
2020	Won	Motion Picture Sound Editors	Outstanding Achievement in Sound Editing - Sound Effects, Foley, Music, Dialogue and ADR for Single Presentation Broadcast Media	El Camino: A Breaking Bad Movie	
2020	Won	Motion Picture Sound Editors	Outstanding Achievement in Sound Editing – Sound Effects, Foley, Music, Dialogue and ADR for Non-Theatrical Feature Film Broadcast Media	Togo	
2020	Nominated	Motion Picture Sound Editors	Outstanding Achievement in Sound Editing – Sound Effects and Foley for Feature Film	John Wick: Chapter 3 – Parabellum	
2020	Nominated	Motion Picture Sound Editors	Outstanding Achievement in Sound Editing – Series 1 Hour – Effects / Foley	Game of Thrones	
2018	Nominated	Primetime Emmy Awards	Outstanding Sound Editing for a Limited or Anthology Series, Movie or Special	Twin Peaks	
2016	Nominated	Motion Picture Sound Editors	Outstanding Sound Editing for a Limited or Anthology Series, Movie or Special	Twin Peaks	
