= Black Rain (1989 American film) =

Action thriller directed by Ridley Scott

- Theatrical release poster
- Directed by: Ridley Scott
- Written by: Craig Bolotin; Warren Lewis
- Produced by: Stanley R. Jaffe; Sherry Lansing
- Starring: Michael Douglas; Andy García; Ken Takakura; Kate Capshaw; Yūsaku Matsuda
- Cinematography: Jan de Bont
- Edited by: Tom Rolf
- Music by: Hans Zimmer
- Production companies: Jaffe-Lansing Productions; Pegasus Film Partners
- Distributed by: Paramount Pictures
- Release date: September 22, 1989
- Running time: 125 minutes
- Country: United States
- Languages: English; Japanese
- Budget: $30 million
- Box office: $134.2 million

Black Rain is a 1989 American neo-noir action thriller film directed by Ridley Scott and starring Michael Douglas, Andy García, Ken Takakura, Kate Capshaw, and Yūsaku Matsuda in his final film role. The film focuses on two NYPD detectives who arrest a member of the yakuza and must escort him back to Japan. Once there, he escapes and the two officers are dragged into the Japanese underworld.

The film was released by Paramount Pictures on September 22, 1989. It received much publicity beforehand being Douglas's first movie since his Oscar winning role in Wall Street—a span of nearly two years. Upon release, it received generally mixed reviews from critics, which praised the performances, Hans Zimmer's musical score, direction and editing but criticized the screenwriting, clichéd story and lack of character development.

In the years since, the film has become a cult film and has been widely praised. It was also a solid box office hit, grossing over $134 million worldwide in front of a production budget of $30 million and was nominated for Best Sound and Best Sound Editing at the 62nd Academy Awards.

== Plot ==
Nick Conklin is an NYPD detective who has come under fire from Internal Affairs, who believes he and his former partner stole money from evidence used in a drug bust. In addition, he is behind on his alimony payments. One day after an interview with Internal Affairs, Nick and his current partner Charlie Vincent witness a lunch meeting between a Mafioso and some Japanese businessmen gone wrong when a yakuza named Koji Sato arrives and kills the Asians as soon as they take a small package from them. After Nick and Charlie arrest Sato, they are assigned to escort him back to Osaka under orders from the Japanese Embassy. Upon landing in Osaka, Nick and Charlie are tricked by yakuza dressed as police officers to hand Sato over to them before the real police arrive.

While explaining the incident, Nick and Charlie convince the Osaka prefectural police to allow them to observe the investigation on Sato's activities, with Assistant Inspector Masahiro Matsumoto accompanying the pair. At a nightclub, Nick meets Joyce, an American hostess from Chicago who tells him Sato is fighting a gang war with a powerful oyabun named Kunio Sugai. The next day, Nick and Charlie join a police raid without permission, and Nick takes a few US$100 bills from the crime scene. He later proves to Matsumoto and his superior that the bills are part of a counterfeiting war between the rival yakuza groups. After a night out with Matsumoto, a slightly drunk Nick and Charlie walk back to their hotel when a motorcyclist steals Charlie's trench coat and leads him to an underground parking garage. Nick follows them, only to watch in horror as a bōsōzoku biker gang attacks Charlie before Sato appears and decapitates him.

Following Charlie's death, Nick reveals to Matsumoto that he embezzled money during the drug raid in New York. Nick and Matsumoto follow a hostess who is their only clue to Sato. The trail leads to a steel foundry, where they see a meeting between Sato and Sugai. It is revealed that the package Sato took in New York is one-half of a printing plate that Sugai sent to the Mafia to verify its craftsmanship, and Sato is offering to return it if Sugai grants him the title of oyabun. Shortly after the meeting, Nick chases after Sato, but is promptly arrested and deported for carrying a gun in public, while Matsumoto is suspended and demoted. Nick sneaks off the plane to pursue Sato on his own. With a tip from Joyce, he meets Sugai, who tells him that he survived the bombing of Hiroshima and that his counterfeiting scheme is his revenge on the U.S. for the "black rain" he experienced that day and for corrupting Sato and the younger Japanese generation with Western ideals. Nick convinces Sugai that he can help him retrieve the stolen plate from Sato to retain Sugai's reputation among the other yakuza clans.

At a remote farm, Nick and Matsumoto regroup and deduce that Sato is plotting to massacre Sugai's gang upon seeing some of his henchmen dressed as rice farmers. During the truce meeting with Sugai, Sato cuts off his little finger, but betrays Sugai by stabbing him in the hand before running off with the plates. As the gangs engage in a gunfight, Nick chases Sato on motorcycle before they tangle in a fistfight. Nick gains the advantage and, having Sato at his mercy, has the choice of whether or not to kill Sato for Charlie and all the humiliation he has suffered. Nick and Matsumoto escort a handcuffed Sato into police headquarters to the amazement of everyone and later receive commendations, which Nick accepts gratefully.

Before Nick boards his flight home, Matsumoto remarks that the printing plates were not recovered, and Nick seems to imply that he took them. Nick thanks Matsumoto for his assistance and friendship and gives him a dress shirt in a gift box. Underneath it, Matsumoto finds both plates.

== Cast ==
- Michael Douglas as Detective Nick Conklin, NYPD
- Andy García as Detective Charlie Vincent, NYPD
- Ken Takakura as Assistant Inspector Masahiro "Mas" Matsumoto, Osaka Prefectural Police
- Kate Capshaw as Joyce
- Yūsaku Matsuda as Koji Sato
- Tomisaburo Wakayama as Kunio Sugai
- Shigeru Kōyama as Chief Inspector Ohashi, Osaka Prefectural Police
- Guts Ishimatsu as Katayama
- Yuya Uchida as Nashida
- Miyuki Ono as Miyuki
- Jun Kunimura as Yoshimoto
- Rikiya Yasuoka as Ishioka
- John Spencer as Captain Oliver, NYPD
- Luis Guzmán as Frankie
- John Costelloe as "The Kid"
- Bruce Katzman as Yudell
- Stephen Root as Detective Berg, NYPD Internal Affairs
- Richard Riehle as Detective Crown, NYPD Internal Affairs

Other cast members in the film include Tim Kelleher as Bobby, Josip Elic as Joe the bartender, Toshishiro Obata as the yakuza mediator, Tak Kubota as an elder oyabun, Ken Kensei as Matsumoto's son, Keone Young as a karaoke singer, Vondie Curtis-Hall as a NYPD officer, Professor Toru Tanaka as Sugai's bodyguard, and Al Leong as Sato's hitman.

== Production ==
=== Development ===
Michael Douglas read the script before offering it to producers Sherry Lansing and Stanley R. Jaffe, whom he worked with on the 1987 film Fatal Attraction.

Paul Verhoeven was originally attached to direct; but, after a slow development process, he left to make Total Recall (1990). He would later collaborate with Douglas on the 1992 film Basic Instinct.

=== Casting ===
Hong Kong actor Jackie Chan was originally approached to play the role of Sato, but instead turned it down as he felt audiences did not want to see him play such a villainous character.

Harrison Ford and Kurt Russell were strongly considered for the role of Nick Conklin, before Douglas was cast due to his favorable relationship with producers Lansing and Jaffe.

Japanese actor Yūsaku Matsuda, who played Sato, died of bladder cancer shortly after the film's completion. Director Ridley Scott dedicated the film to his memory.

=== Filming ===
Filming started on October 31, 1988, and ended in March 1989. Production was originally scheduled on October 15, but was delayed due to the 1988 Writers Guild of America strike.

The high cost and red tape involved in filming in Japan prompted director Scott to declare that he would never film in that country again. In one instance, while filming in a steel mill, Scott was interrupted mid-take by an official who placed his hand over the camera. Due to strict firearms laws in the country, the production also had difficulty using prop firearms, and were prohibited from firing blank ammunition. Scott was eventually forced to leave the country and complete the final climactic scene in Napa Valley, California, after ruling out shooting in New York or Hong Kong.

The early departure caused additional problems. Deals with Japanese actors had to be renegotiated and some of the actors were unable to get visas in time to complete their roles in the U.S. Some of the Japanese bit players, who had already been filmed, were replaced with lookalikes while others were cut out of the film. Various props and vehicles had to be duplicated or sent to Los Angeles. Two Japanese propane fueled cars were shipped over, but they did not meet U.S. safety standards, and were destroyed once filming ended.

The unfavorable working conditions also caused original cinematographer Howard Atherton to quit early in production, and he was replaced by Jan de Bont. Atherton is credited with "Additional Photography."

=== Locations ===
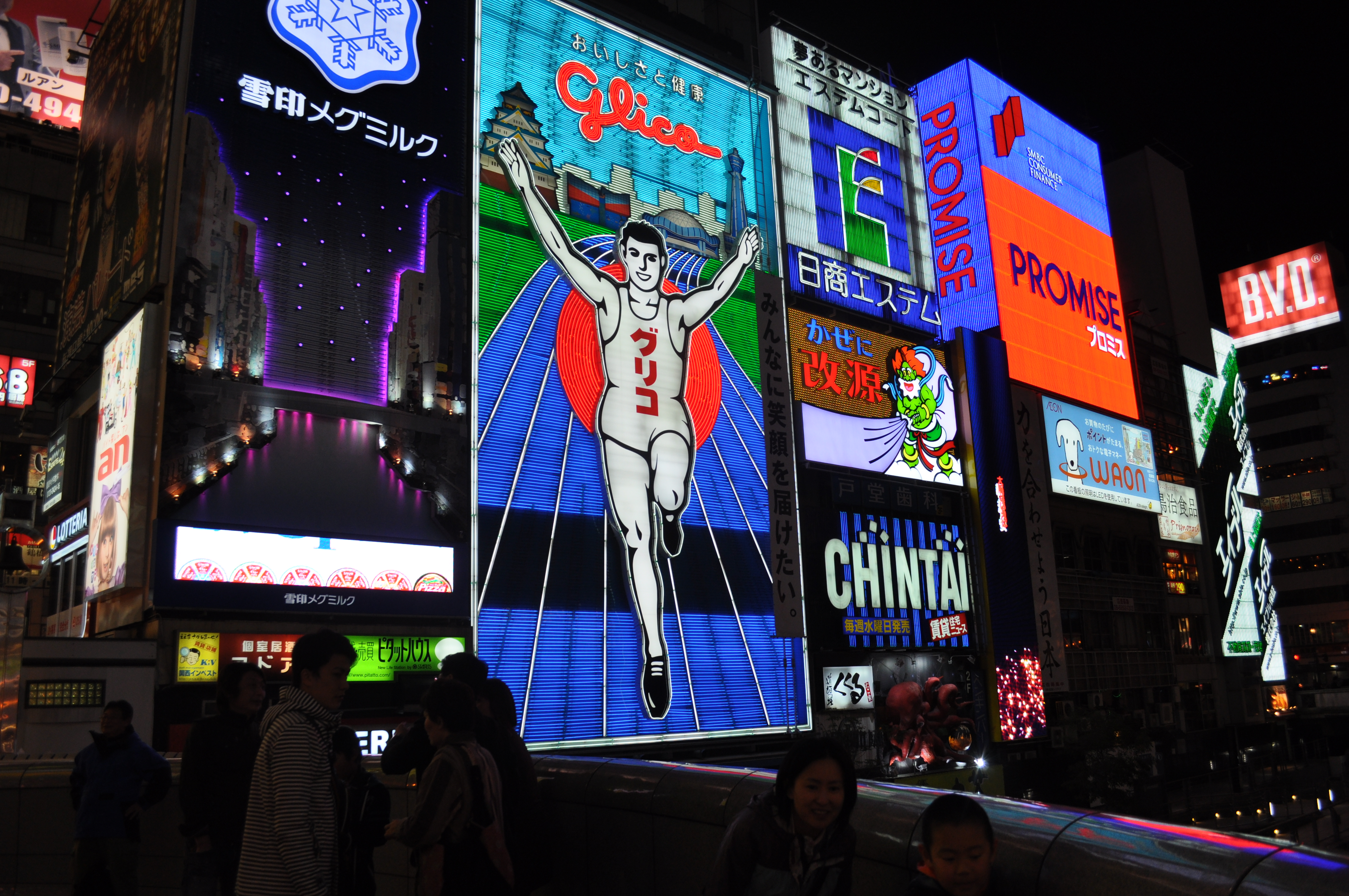
Dōtonbori in Osaka, one of the film's central locations.

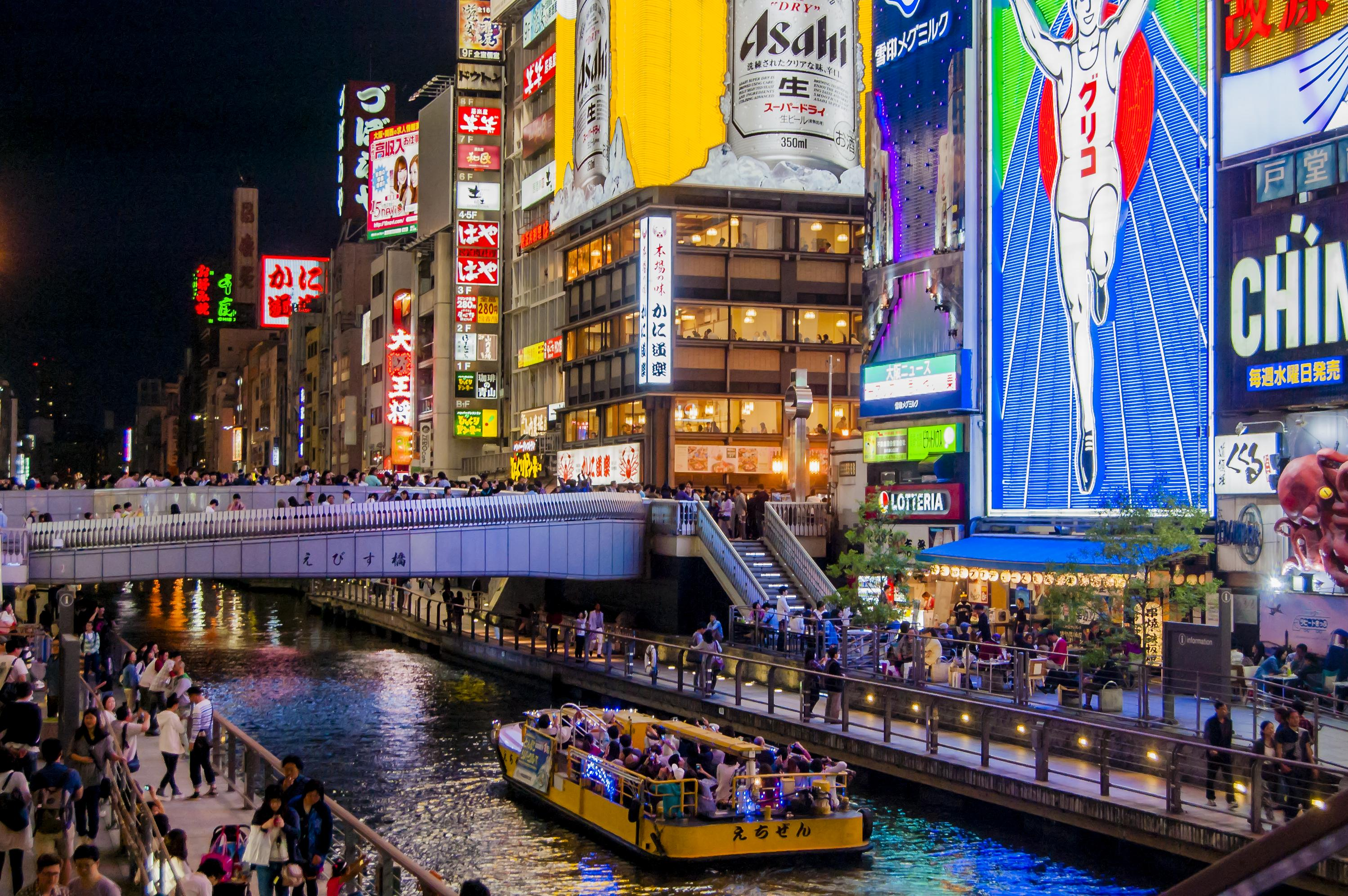
Ebisubashi Bridge.

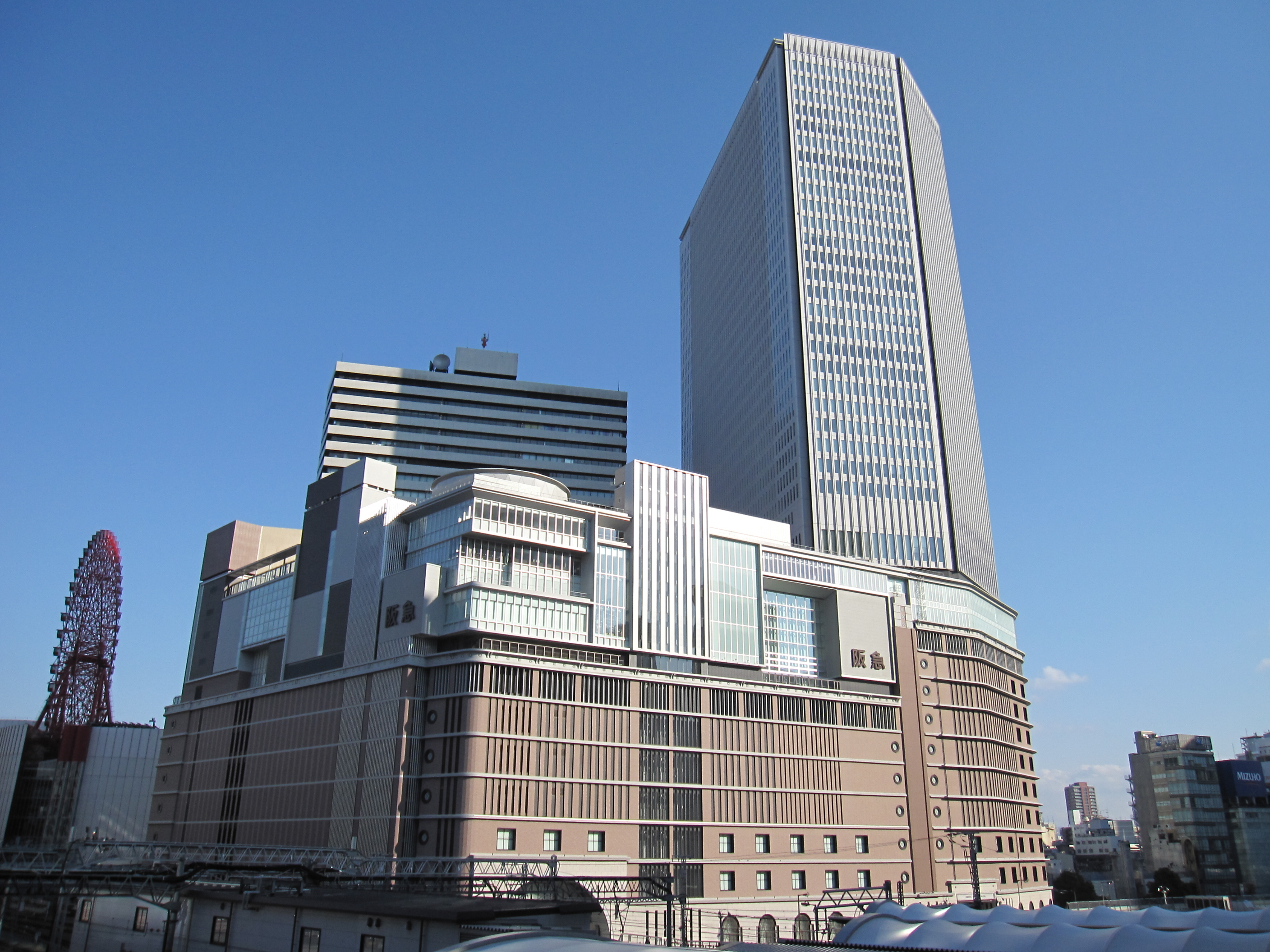
Hankyu Department Store Umeda.

Large parts of Black Rain were filmed in Osaka, although some of the locations have changed somewhat since the late 1980s when production took place. The original intention of Scott was to film in the Kabukichō nightlife district of Shinjuku, Tokyo. However, the Osaka authorities were more receptive towards film permits so the similarly futuristic neon-infused Dōtonbori in Namba was chosen as the principal filming location in Japan.

An aerial shot of Osaka bay at sunset with the estuaries of the Yodogawa, Kanzakigawa and Ajigawa rivers frames the opening sequence of the arrival into Japan.

The main filming location in Osaka is by the Ebisubashi bridge. The futurist Kirin Plaza building (architect Shin Takamatsu, built 1987), the Ebisubashi and the famous neon wall overlooking the Dōtonbori canal creates the Blade Runner-esque mise-en-scène.

Umeda, Osaka's northern center, is represented by the first floor of the Hankyu Department Store Umeda branch. Resembling a futuristic neo-gothic nave from a cathedral, this is where Charlie Vincent's trenchcoat is stolen by a Bōsōzoku biker. Because the production could not finish the segment in Japan, it was shot in downtown Los Angeles.

The now removed Shinsaibashi bridge (dismantled in 1995), Osaka Municipal Central Wholesale Market, Nippon Steel Works in Sakai, Kyōbashi, the elevated Hanshin Expressway, Osaka Castle and Nankō Port Town also feature briefly, as well as the Motomachi shopping district of neighboring Kobe.

In New York City, the 1964 New York World's Fair's Unisphere opens the film, followed by Nick Conklin riding over the Queensboro Bridge. The illegal bike race between Nick and an anonymous challenger took place from underneath the west underside of the Brooklyn Bridge north to the Manhattan Bridge. Shooting also took place at Silvercup Studios.

Sugai's house is Frank Lloyd Wright's famous Ennis House, on the slopes below the Griffith Observatory. It had already been used by Scott as Rick Deckard's apartment block in Blade Runner. FourFortyFour South Flower was also used as a location.

The climactic motorbike chase sequence was shot in the Napa Valley region of Northern California, partially on the grounds of the Domaine Chandon vineyard, and the Silverado Resort and Spa, which at the time was owned by Sega chairman Isao Okawa. The airport scene was shot at Los Angeles International Airport as a stand-in for Osaka International Airport. The Osaka steel mill scene, which was left unfinished due to the crew's premature leave from Japan, was completed at California Steel Industries in Fontana, which was later used in Terminator 2: Judgment Day.

== Release ==
Black Rain was released in the United States on September 22, 1989. It was screened as the opening film at the 3rd Tokyo International Film Festival in October 1989 and shown as the Special Invitational Screening film, with Ken Takakura attending the event. It was later screened at the Golden Horse Film Festival in Taipei, where it won Best Foreign Film.

=== Home media ===
Black Rain was first released in the U.S. on Blu-ray Special Collector's Edition in 2007 with six extra features including audio commentary by Scott, a two-part "Making of Black Rain" documentary, a 20-minute featurette about the script and cast and a 12-minute segment looking at the post-production. It was first released in the UK in 2008. The same edition was re-released by Warner Bros. in 2013.

== Reception ==
=== Box office ===
In its opening weekend, Black Rain grossed US$9.6 million in 1,610 theaters in the U.S. and Canada, ranking #1 at the box office and staying there for two weeks. At the Japanese box office, Black Rain was the fifth top-grossing foreign film of 1989, earning ¥1.35 billion in distributor rentals. The film grossed a total of US$46.2 million in the United States and Canada, and US$88 million in other territories, for a worldwide gross of US$134.2 million.

=== Critical response ===
The film holds a 54% rating on Rotten Tomatoes based on 26 reviews with the consensus: "Black Rain has its fair share of Ridley Scott's directorial flair, but its paint-by-numbers story never rises above genre conventions." On Metacritic, it has a score of 56% based on reviews from 18 critics. Audiences polled by CinemaScore gave the film an average grade of "B+" on an A+ to F scale.

Vincent Canby of The New York Times wrote that the film "plays as if it had been written in the course of production. There seems to have been more desperation off the screen than ever gets into the movie. As bad movies go, however, the American Black Rain is easy to sit through, mostly because of the way Mr. Scott and his production associates capture the singular look of contemporary urban Japan." Roger Ebert gave the film two stars out of four and stated: "Even given all of its inconsistencies, implausibilities and recycled cliches, Black Rain might have been entertaining if the filmmakers had found the right note for the material. But this is a designer movie, all look and no heart, and the Douglas character is curiously unsympathetic." Gene Siskel of the Chicago Tribune awarded the same two-star grade and wrote: "The crosscultural action picture might have worked if the filmmakers had come up with a script in which Douglas' character had been rendered weak and confused by being a fish trying to swim in strange waters. But instead he is presented as a traditional action hero dominating everyone in sight. The cultural imperialism of that decision makes for a routine and frequently offensive story full of Asian stereotypes."

A review in Variety stated: "Since this is a Ridley Scott film, Black Rain is about 90% atmosphere and 10% story. But what atmosphere! This gripping crime thriller about hardboiled N.Y. cop Michael Douglas tracking a yakuza hood in Osaka, Japan, boasts magnificent lensing by Jan DeBont and powerfully baroque production design by Norris Spencer." Michael Wilmington of the Los Angeles Times described the plot as "standard '80s schtick" but called the visuals "hellaciously gorgeous" and concluded that "action movies are one genre where clichés can be transcended and execution can triumph over content. That's what happens here." Rita Kempley of The Washington Post wrote that Scott "approaches this prickly action thriller with the gusto of a sushi chef in a fish storm. Unfortunately and typically, he loses sight of his story in this artistic barrage of blood and guts. It's a gorgeous, erratic movie most definitely not for those with an aversion to cutlery."

In retrospect, Michael Douglas said: "It was hard to know who to root for. And people here were uncomfortable with race stuff and talking about the bomb. There was a critic, who'll remain nameless, who called it a racist film. I called him up and asked, 'Have you ever been to Japan?' He said, 'No', and I said, 'Then what the hell are you talking about?' The Japanese loved it. I loved it—I thought it rocked from top to bottom."

During an interview on the podcast WTF with Marc Maron in November 2021, Scott called the film "f*cking great".

=== Awards and nominations ===
Award	Year	Category	Nominee(s)	Result
Academy Awards	1989	Best Sound	Donald O. Mitchell, Kevin O'Connell, Greg P. Russell, Keith A. Wester	Nominated
Academy Awards	1989	Best Sound Effects Editing	Milton Burrow, William Manger	Nominated
Golden Horse Awards	1989	Best Foreign Film	Ridley Scott	Won
Japan Academy Film Prize	1990	Outstanding Foreign Language Film	Ridley Scott	Nominated

== Soundtrack ==
Black Rain marked the first collaboration between Hans Zimmer and Ridley Scott. Zimmer would go on to score several more films for Scott, including Thelma and Louise, Hannibal, Gladiator, Black Hawk Down and Matchstick Men. The film's score was conducted and orchestrated by Shirley Walker.

In addition to the score, the soundtrack features the chart hits "The Way You Do the Things You Do" by UB40 and "Back to Life" by Soul II Soul, plus the original songs "Livin' on the Edge of the Night" by Iggy Pop and "I'll Be Holding On" by Gregg Allman. Japanese musician Ryuichi Sakamoto contributed the song "Laserman" to the soundtrack.

The soundtrack was originally released as a 7-track album in 1989 by Virgin Movie Music on cassette, vinyl and compact disc. It was re-released in 2012 by La-La Land Records as a two-disc set, with the complete score as Disc 1 and an extended version of the 1989 soundtrack as Disc 2.

== See also ==
- The Yakuza (1974)
- Rising Sun (1993)
