= Milton Burrow =

American sound editor

- Born: Milton Cathey Burrow; October 30, 1920; Frederick, Oklahoma, U.S.
- Died: January 9, 2018 (aged 97); California, U.S.
- Other name: Milton C. Burrow
- Occupation: Sound editor
- Years active: 1959-1995
- Children: Neil Burrow

Milton Cathey Burrow (October 30, 1920 – January 9, 2018) was an American sound editor. He was nominated at the 62nd Academy Awards for the film Black Rain. This was in the category of Best Sound Editing. He shared his nomination with William Manger. He also won two Emmy Awards for the sound of the made for television films, QB VII and Raid on Entebbe. He received another Emmy nomination for Police Story. As well as a BAFTA nomination for Best Soundtrack for the film All the President's Men.

Burrow died on January 9, 2018, in California and was subsequently honored in the Oscars 2019 In Memoriam reel.
