= Warren Lewis (screenwriter) =

American film producer and screenwriter

- Occupations: Film producer, screenwriter
- Years active: 1989–present

Warren Lewis is an American film producer and screenwriter. He is best known for his screenwriting contributions on the films Black Rain (1989, directed by Ridley Scott) and The 13th Warrior (1999, directed by John McTiernan). He also worked as an assistant film director on numerous studio and independent films, including Boaz Davidson's Hospital Massacre (1982), Penelope Spheeris' The Boys Next Door (1985) and McTiernan's directorial debut film Nomads (1986). Lewis has an extensive background in film and video production.

Lewis' original and developed screenplays, television pilots and adaptations include the adaptation of the novel Cold, Cold Heart; The Tale of the Bloodstone Riders, a western set against the background of post Civil War reconstruction Texas; and Dress Blues, a story set in the home front of the Vietnam War and the events of the 1968 Democratic National Convention. A World Away, The Point - A TV drama set in The United States Military Academy And an adaptation of S. Ansky's play The Dybbuk, is casting. His current project is a military thriller set in West Germany at the height of the Cold War.

Lewis is an active educator in screenwriting. He is a professor in the Master of Fine Arts in screenwriting program at the California State University at Fullerton and teaches beginning and advanced screenwriting at the UCLA Writer's program via UCLA Extension. He is a frequent guest lecturer at University film and writing programs. His academic research on the contributions of Vitagraph Studios (1897-1925) to U.S. film authorship is ongoing. Lewis is active on panels and presents papers at The University Film and Video Association and Broadcast Educators Association annual conferences.

Lewis is the 2014 recipient of the Person of Letters award from the La Jolla Writers Conference. The jury prize at the Wallachia ( Romania) international film festival and was awarded the jury prize at the American Screenwriters Conference in 2021. t

== Biography ==
Lewis studied media at CUNY, cinema at The State University of New York at Binghamton (now Binghamton University) and is a graduate of New York University. He studied screenwriting at Columbia University with Samson Raphaelson.
