= William Manger =

American sound editor

- Other name: William L. Manger
- Occupation: Sound editor
- Years active: 1975-1998

William Manger is an American sound editor. He was nominated at the 62nd Academy Awards for the film Black Rain. This was in the category of Best Sound Editing. He shared his nomination with Milton Burrow.

He won one BAFTA award for sound for the film WarGames. As well as an Emmy Award for the TV film Raid on Entebbe. He has 3 other Emmy nominations also.

== Selected filmography ==
- Quest for Camelot (1998)
- Batman & Robin (1997)
- The Shawshank Redemption (1994)
- Another Stakeout (1993)
- Sister Act 2: Back in the Habit (1993)
- The Hard Way (1991)
- Bird on a Wire (1990)
- Child's Play 2 (1990)
- Black Rain (1989)
- *batteries not included (1987)
- Stakeout (1987)
- Short Circuit (1986)
- Jagged Edge (1985)
- Out of Africa (1985)
- Ghostbusters (1984)
- WarGames (1983)
- Xanadu (1980)
